= Artemis Accords =

Multilateral agreement on human moon exploration

The Artemis Accords: Principles for Cooperation in the Civil Exploration and Use of the Moon, Mars, Comets, and Asteroids for Peaceful Purposes
- Signatory nations of the Artemis Accords, highlighted in blue, as of 24 September 2026 (signatory nations after that date are not coloured)
- Type: Space law
- Signed: October 13, 2020; 6 years ago
- Parties: 78
- Languages: English

Full text
- Artemis Accords at Wikisource

The Artemis Accords are a non-binding set of principles for outer space exploration and development, established through a series of bilateral agreements between the United States and partner nations. The Accords are related to the Artemis program, an American-led effort to return humans to the Moon in 2028, with the ultimate goal of expanding space exploration to Mars and beyond.

As of October 28, 2026, with the accession of Vietnam, 78 countries have signed the Accords, including 35 in Europe, 19 in Asia, 8 in South America, 5 in North America, 9 in Africa, and 2 in Oceania.

Drafted by NASA and the US Department of State, the Accords establish a framework for cooperation in the civil exploration and peaceful use of the Moon, Mars, and other astronomical objects. The broader legal status of space mining remains unclear. Proponents argue the Accords oblige signatories to uphold the United Nations Outer Space Treaty of 1967, and that they cite most major UN-brokered conventions constituting space law. (Note: Except the Moon Treaty, despite Australia having ratified it. The Moon Treaty only has 17 State Parties, none of which has engaged in self-launched human spaceflight.) Critics have argued the Accords violate the Outer Space Treaty's prohibition of national appropriation of outer space by allowing signatories to claim resources extracted from the Moon, asteroids, and other bodies, that this favors US and commercial mining interests, and that they subvert the United Nations Office for Outer Space Affairs.

The Accords were originally signed on October 13, 2020, by representatives of the national space agencies of eight countries: Australia, Canada, Italy, Japan, Luxembourg, the United Arab Emirates, the United Kingdom, and the United States. The Accords remain open for signature indefinitely, as NASA anticipates more nations joining. Additional signatories can choose to directly participate in Artemis program activities, or may agree simply to commit to the principles for responsible exploration of the Moon as set out in the Accords.

== List of signatories ==
State	Continent	Signed	Official signing
Australia	Oceania	Oct 13, 2020	Megan Clark, head of the Australian Space Agency
Canada	North America	Oct 13, 2020	Lisa Campbell, president of the Canadian Space Agency
Italy	Europe	Oct 13, 2020	Riccardo Fraccaro, Undersecretary of State at the Presidency of the Italian Council of Ministers
Japan	Asia	Oct 13, 2020	Hagiuda Koichi, Minister of Education, Culture, Sports, Science and Technology and Inoue Shinji, Minister of State for Space Policy
Luxembourg	Europe	Oct 13, 2020	Franz Fayot, Minister of the Economy
United Arab Emirates	Asia	Oct 13, 2020	Sarah Al Amiri, Minister for Advanced Technology and Chair of the United Arab Emirates Space Agency
United Kingdom	Europe	Oct 13, 2020	Graham Turnock, Chief Executive of the UK Space Agency; The signature of the UK was extended to the Isle of Man on July 27, 2021
United States	North America	Oct 13, 2020	James Bridenstine, NASA Administrator
Ukraine	Europe	Nov 12, 2020	
South Korea	Asia	May 24, 2021	Lim Hyesook, Minister of Science and ICT
New Zealand	Oceania	May 31, 2021	Peter Crabtree, New Zealand Space Agency
Brazil	South America	Jun 15, 2021	Marcos Pontes, Minister of Science, Technology, and Innovation
Poland	Europe	Oct 26, 2021	Grzegorz Wrochna, president of Polish Space Agency
Mexico	North America	Dec 9, 2021	Marcelo Ebrard, Secretary of Foreign Affairs
Israel	Asia	Jan 26, 2022	Uri Oron, Director General of the Israel Space Agency
Romania	Europe	Mar 1, 2022	Marius-Ioan Piso, president and CEO of the Romanian Space Agency
Bahrain	Asia	Mar 2, 2022	Dr. Mohamed Al Aseeri, CEO of National Space Science Agency
Singapore	Asia	Mar 28, 2022	Gan Kim Yong, Minister for Trade and Industry
Colombia	South America	May 10, 2022	Marta Lucía Ramírez, Vice President and Foreign Minister
France	Europe	Jun 7, 2022	Philippe Baptiste, president of CNES
Saudi Arabia	Asia	Jul 14, 2022	Mohammed bin Saud Al-Tamimi, CEO of the Saudi Space Commission
Nigeria	Africa	Dec 13, 2022	Isa Ali Ibrahim, Minister of Communications and Digital Economy
Rwanda	Africa	Dec 13, 2022	Francis Ngabo, CEO of Rwanda Space Agency
Czech Republic	Europe	May 3, 2023	Jan Lipavský, Minister of Foreign Affairs
Spain	Europe	May 30, 2023	Diana Morant, Minister of Science and Innovation
Ecuador	South America	Jun 21, 2023	Gustavo Manrique, Minister of Foreign Affairs
India	Asia	Jun 22, 2023	Taranjit Singh Sandhu, Ambassador of India to the United States
Argentina	South America	Jul 27, 2023	Daniel Filmus, Minister of Science, Technology, and Innovation
Germany	Europe	Sep 14, 2023	Walther Pelzer, Director General of the German Space Agency at DLR
Iceland	Europe	Oct 10, 2023	
Netherlands	Europe	Nov 1, 2023	Harm van de Wetering, Director of Netherlands Space Office
Bulgaria	Europe	Nov 9, 2023	Milena Stoycheva, Minister of Innovation and Growth
Angola	Africa	Nov 30, 2023	
Belgium	Europe	Jan 23, 2024	Hadja Lahbib, Minister of Foreign Affairs of Belgium
Greece	Europe	Feb 9, 2024	Giorgos Gerapetritis, Minister of Foreign Affairs
Uruguay	South America	Feb 15, 2024	Omar Paganini, Minister of Foreign Affairs
Switzerland	Europe	April 15, 2024	Guy Parmelin, Federal Councillor
Sweden	Europe	April 16, 2024	Mats Persson, Minister for Education
Slovenia	Europe	April 19, 2024	
Lithuania	Europe	May 15, 2024	Aušrinė Armonaitė, Minister of Economy and Innovation
Peru	South America	May 30, 2024	Javier González-Olaechea, Minister of Foreign Affairs
Slovakia	Europe	May 30, 2024	
Armenia	Asia	Jun 12, 2024	Mkhitar Hayrapetyan, Minister of High-Tech Industry
Dominican Republic	North America	Oct 4, 2024	Sonia Guzmán, Ambassador of the Dominican Republic to the United States
Estonia	Europe	Oct 13, 2024	Erkki Keldo, Minister of Economy and Industry
Cyprus	Asia	Oct 23, 2024	Nicodemos Damianou, Deputy Minister of Research, Innovation, and Digital Policy
Chile	South America	Oct 25, 2024	Aisén Etcheverry, Minister of Science, Technology, Knowledge and Innovation
Denmark	Europe	Nov 13, 2024	Christina Egelund, Minister of Higher Education and Science
Panama	North America	Dec 11, 2024	José Miguel Alemán Healy, Ambassador of the Republic of Panama to the United States
Austria	Europe	Dec 11, 2024	Petra Schneebauer, Ambassador of the Republic of Austria to the United States
Thailand	Asia	Dec 16, 2024	Pakorn Apaphant, Executive Director of the Geo-Informatics and Space Technology Development Agency
Liechtenstein	Europe	Dec 20, 2024	Rainer Schnepfleitner, Director of Liechtenstein's Office for Communications
Finland	Europe	Jan 21, 2025	Wille Rydman, Minister of Economic Affairs
Bangladesh	Asia	Apr 8, 2025	Ashraf Uddin, Secretary of Defence of Bangladesh
Norway	Europe	May 15, 2025	Cecilie Myrseth, Minister of Trade and Industry
Senegal	Africa	Jul 24, 2025	Maram Kairé, Director General of the Senegalese Space Study Agency
Hungary	Europe	Oct 22, 2025	Péter Szijjártó, Minister of Foreign Affairs
Malaysia	Asia	Oct 26, 2025	Mohamad Hasan, Minister of Foreign Affairs
Philippines	Asia	Oct 27, 2025	Gay Jane Perez, Officer-in-charge of the Philippine Space Agency
Portugal	Europe	Jan 11, 2026	Helena Canhão, Secretary of State for Science and Innovation
Oman	Asia	Jan 26, 2026	Said al-Maawali, Minister of Transportation, Communication, and Information Technology
Latvia	Europe	Apr 20, 2026	Dace Melbārde, Minister for Education and Science
Jordan	Asia	Apr 23, 2026	Dina Kawar, Jordanian Ambassador to the United States
Morocco	Africa	Apr 29, 2026	Nasser Bourita, Minister of Foreign Affairs, African Cooperation and Moroccan Expatriates
Malta	Europe	May 4, 2026	Clifton Grima, Minister for Education, Youth, Sports, Research and Innovation
Ireland	Europe	May 4, 2026	Peter Burke, Minister for Enterprise, Tourism and Employment
Paraguay	South America	May 7, 2026	Osvaldo Almirón Riveros, Minister President of the Paraguayan Space Agency
Botswana	Africa	Jun 25, 2026	David Tshere, Minister of Communications and Innovation
Serbia	Europe	Jul 16, 2026	Marko Đurić, Minister of Foreign Affairs
Mauritius	Africa	Jul 17, 2026	Navindsing Jugmohunsing, Permanent Secretary of Ministry of Tertiary Education, Science and Research
Turkey	Asia	Aug 31, 2026	Mehmet Fatih Kacır, Minister of Industry and Technology
Djibouti	Africa	Sep 14, 2026	Mohamed Siad Doualeh, Djiboutian Ambassador to the United States
Albania	Europe	Sep 21, 2026	Ferit Hoxha, Minister for Europe and Foreign Affairs
Croatia	Europe	Sep 23, 2026	Radovan Fuchs, Minister of Science, Education and Youth
Ivory Coast	Africa	Sep 24, 2026	Adama Diawara, Minister of Higher Education and Scientific Research
San Marino	Europe	Sep 25, 2026	Rossano Fabbri, Minister of Industry and Technological Research
Uzbekistan	Asia	Oct 19, 2026	Bakhtiyor Saidov, Minister of Foreign Affairs
Vietnam	Asia	Oct 28, 2026	Vũ Hải Quân, Minister of Science and Technology

== History ==
On May 5, 2020, Reuters published an exclusive report that the Donald Trump administration was drafting a new international agreement for mining on the Moon, which would draw from the 1967 Outer Space Treaty. Ten days later, then-NASA Administrator Jim Bridenstine officially announced the Artemis Accords, a series of agreements with partner nations aimed at establishing a governing framework for exploring and mining the Moon.

The Accords originated from the eponymous Artemis Program, an American plan launched in 2017 to send the first woman and the next man to the Moon by 2024. Bridenstine stated that the agreements were intended to create a uniform set of guidelines for countries to avoid potential conflict or misunderstanding in future space endeavors; governments that sign the Accords may formally take part in the Artemis Program. The Accords were drafted by NASA, the U.S. Department of State, and the newly re-established National Space Council; a draft was released to several governments for consultation before the final document was announced in May 2020.

On October 13, 2020, in a recorded and livestreamed ceremony, the Accords were signed by the directors of the national space agencies of the United States, Australia, Canada, Japan, Luxembourg, Italy, the United Kingdom, and the United Arab Emirates. The head of the Ukrainian national space agency signed the Accords exactly one month later.

In 2021, South Korea became the tenth country to sign the Accords, with New Zealand joining a week later. The following June, Brazil became the first country in Latin America to join the Artemis Accords, after previously indicating its intent to sign in 2020. Poland signed the Accords at the 72nd International Astronautical Congress (IAC) in Dubai, with the head of the Polish Space Agency expressing a desire to develop indigenous Polish space technology. Mexico joined the Accords in December 2021.

In 2022, the number of signatories of the Accords more than doubled from the previous year: Israel signed, followed by Romania, Bahrain, and Singapore in March; Colombia in May, and France on June 7, 2022, the 60th anniversary of the founding of its space program (pursuant to meetings in November 2021 between U.S. Vice President Kamala Harris and French President Emmanuel Macron in which he expressed France's intent to join). Saudi Arabia signed the Accords on July 14, 2022, becoming the fourth Middle Eastern and third Arab country to join. On December 13, 2022, at the United States–Africa Leaders Summit 2022, Rwanda and Nigeria became the first African nations to sign the Artemis Accords. Representatives from signatory nations held their first meeting on September 19, 2022, at the IAC to discuss the Accords and cooperation in space more broadly.

In 2023, signatories to the Accords continued to grow, including: the Czech Republic and Spain both signing within a single month, followed by Ecuador as well as India signing the Accords during prime minister Narendra Modi's state visit to the U.S. In September 2023, Director General of the German Space Agency at DLR and Member of the DLR Executive Board Walther Pelzer, signed the Accords for Germany in the German embassy in Washington D.C. The ceremony was attended and witnessed as well by Space-Coordinator of the German Government, Anna Christmann, the current German ambassador in Washington, Andreas Michaelis as well as the Administrator of NASA, Bill Nelson. Iceland, the Netherlands and Bulgaria joined in October/November 2023. Angola joined in December 2023 during a ceremony in Washington, D.C.

In 2024, Belgium, Greece, Uruguay, Switzerland, Sweden, Slovenia, Lithuania, Peru, Slovakia, Armenia, the Dominican Republic, Estonia, Cyprus, Chile, Denmark, Panama, Austria, Thailand, and Liechtenstein joined the Accords.

With the accession of Thailand into the Accords on December 16, 2024, it became the first signatory to participate in both the International Lunar Research Station and the Artemis Accords, the second and third being Senegal and Serbia, respectively.

In 2025, Finland, Bangladesh, Norway, Senegal, Hungary, Malaysia and the Philippines joined the Accords. The Philippines and Malaysia joined the Accords on the sidelines of the 2025 ASEAN Summits.

In 2026, Portugal, Oman, Latvia, Jordan, Morocco, Malta, Ireland, Paraguay, Botswana, Serbia, Mauritius, Turkey, Djibouti, Albania, Croatia, Ivory Coast, San Marino, Uzbekistan, and Vietnam joined the Accords.

== Principles ==
Although a prerequisite for taking part in the Artemis Program, the Accords have been interpreted as codifying key principles and guidelines for exploring space generally. Their stated purpose is to "provide for operational implementation of important obligations contained in the Outer Space Treaty and other instruments." The Accords are a single document, signed by each country that commits to the Accords' principles. Bilateral agreements between space agencies for specific operations on the Moon and beyond are expected to reference the Accords and implement them in particular projects.

The provisions:

- Affirm that cooperative activities under these Accords should be exclusively for peaceful purposes and in accordance with relevant international law.
- Confirm a commitment to transparency and to share scientific information, consistent with Article XI of the Outer Space Treaty.
- Call for a commitment to use reasonable efforts to utilize current interoperability standards for space-based infrastructure, and to establish standards when they do not exist or are inadequate.
- Call for a commitment to take all reasonable efforts to render necessary assistance to personnel in outer space who are in distress and according to their obligations under the Rescue and Return Agreement.
- Specify responsibility for the registration of objects in space, as required by the Registration Convention
- Call for a commitment to publicly share information on their activities and to the open sharing of scientific data. While doing so, signatories agree to coordinate with each other to provide appropriate protection for any proprietary and/or export-controlled information, and this provision does not extend to private sector operations unless conducted on behalf of a signatory.
- Include an agreement to preserve outer space heritage, which they consider to comprise historically significant human or robotic landing sites, artifacts, spacecraft, and other evidence of activity, and to contribute to multinational efforts to develop practices and rules to do so.
- Include an agreement that extraction and utilization of space resources should be conducted in a manner that complies with the Outer Space Treaty and in support of safe and sustainable activities. The signatories affirm that this does not inherently constitute national appropriation, which is prohibited by the Outer Space Treaty. They also express an intent to contribute to multilateral efforts to further develop international practices and rules on this subject.
- Reaffirm the signatories' commitment to the Outer Space Treaty's provisions relating to due regard and harmful interference with other nations' activities, and to provide information regarding the location and nature of space-based activities. Signatories express an intention to contribute to multilateral efforts to further develop international practices, criteria, and rules to assure this. To implement this, the Accords provide for the announcement of "safety zones", where other operations or an anomalous event could reasonably cause harmful interference. The size and scope of these safe zones should be based on the nature and environment of the operations involved and determined in a reasonable manner leveraging commonly accepted scientific and engineering principles. Within their safety zones, the signatories commit to respect the principle of free access to all areas of celestial bodies by others and all other provisions of the Outer Space Treaty.
- Include a commitment to mitigate space debris and to limit the generation of new, harmful space debris in the normal operations, break-up in operational or post-mission phases, and accidents.

=== Bilateral accords ===
- Multi-Purpose Habitation module agreement between NASA and ASI

== Reactions ==
=== Support ===
The Artemis Accords have generally been welcomed for advancing international law and cooperation in space. Observers claim that the substance of the Accords is "uncontentious" and represent a "significant political attempt to codify key principles of space law" for governing nations' space activities. International legal scholars also credit the agreement with helping influence space exploration in the direction of uniform standards of cooperation and peaceful use. The Accords have also been lauded for being the first time several nations have agreed to recognize the presence of human cultural heritage in outer space and the need to protect it.

With Australia signing and ratifying both the Moon Treaty as well as the Artemis Accords, there has been a discussion if they can be harmonized. In this light an Implementation Agreement for the Moon Treaty has been advocated for, as a way to compensate for the shortcomings of the Moon Treaty and to harmonize it with other laws, allowing it to be more widely accepted.

=== Criticism ===
The Accords have also been criticized for allegedly being "too centered on American and commercial interests." Russia has condemned them as a "blatant attempt to create international space law that favors the United States." In light of the Wolf Amendment, Chinese government affiliated media has called the Accords "akin to European colonial enclosure land-taking methods." Russia and China have since reached an understanding to work together on the Chinese International Lunar Research Station concept, to serve as a potential competing option for third parties such as Pakistan.

Two researchers writing in Science magazine's Policy Forum have called on countries to speak up about their objections, and argued that the United States should go through the United Nations treaty process in order to negotiate on space mining. They were concerned NASA's Accords, if accepted by many nations, would enable the Accords' interpretation of the Outer Space Treaty to prevail. Acceptance of the Artemis Accords is a prerequisite for participation in NASA's Artemis lunar program.

Critics also contend that since the Outer Space Treaty expressly forbids nations from staking claim to another planetary body, the Accords violate space law by allowing signatories to lay claim to any resources extracted from celestial objects. Frans von der Dunk of the University of Nebraska-Lincoln claims the Accords strengthen "the US interpretation of the Outer Space Treaty", namely "the basic right for individual States to allow the private sector to become engaged" in commercial activities. The weakened alternative interpretation is that "unilateral approval of commercial exploitation is not in compliance with the Outer Space Treaty, and that only an international regime, notably—presumably—including an international licensing system, could legitimise such commercial exploitation."

== See also ==
- Artemis program – NASA-led lunar exploration program
- Chandrayaan Program – Indian Lunar exploration programme
- Chinese Lunar Exploration Program – Lunar research program (2004–present)
- Coordinated Lunar Time
- International Lunar Research Station – Planned international lunar base
- Luna-Glob – Moon exploration program by the Russian Federal Space Agency
- Moonbase – Long-term human settlement on the Moon
- Moon Treaty
- Politics of outer space
- Space law
