= List of international presidential trips made by Peter Pellegrini =

This is a list of international presidential trips made by Peter Pellegrini, the sixth president of Slovakia, since his inauguration on 15 June 2024.

== Countries ==
Since June 2024, he has visited these countries:

- 1 visit: Austria
- 1 visit: Azerbaijan
- 2 visits: Belgium
- 2 visits: Czech Republic
- 3 visits: France
- 1 visit: Germany
- 1 visit: Hungary
- 1 visit: Latvia
- 1 visit: Netherlands
- 2 visits: Poland
- 1 visit: Switzerland
- 2 visits: United States
- 1 visit: Vatican City

== List ==
=== 2024 ===
No.	Date	Country	Venue	Photo	Details
1	17 June 2024	Belgium	Brussels		Informal EU summit
2	26 June 2024	Czech Republic	Prague		Meeting with Czech president Petr Pavel
3	26–28 June 2024	Belgium	Brussels		Meeting with Ursula von der Leyen (26 June); EU summit (27–28 June)
4	4 July 2024	Poland	Warsaw		Meeting with Polish president Andrzej Duda
5	9–11 July 2024	United States	Washington, D.C.		NATO Summit Washington 2024
6	18 July 2024	Hungary	Budapest		Meeting with Hungarian president Tamás Sulyok
7	25–31 July 2024	France	Paris		2024 Summer Olympics
8	3–5 September 2024	France	Paris		2024 Summer Paralympics
9	11 September 2024	Austria	Vienna		Meeting with Austrian president Alexander Van der Bellen
10	22–28 September 2024	United States	New York City		General Debate of the 79th Session of the United Nations General Assembly
11	28 September 2024	Czech Republic	Hluboká nad Vltavou		Meeting with former Czech President Miloš Zeman
12	1 October 2024	Switzerland	Geneva		Meeting with the Slovak scientific community at CERN
13	11 October 2024	Poland	Kraków		19th meeting of heads of state of Arraiolos Group
14	24 October 2024	Germany	Berlin		Meeting with German president Frank-Walter Steinmeier and German Chancellor Olaf Scholz
15	7–8 November 2024	France	Paris		OECD Council meeting
16	11–12 November 2024	Azerbaijan	Baku		Meeting with Azerbaijani President Ilham Aliyev; UN Climate Change Conference 2024
17	2 December 2024	Netherlands	Amsterdam		Meeting with Dutch King Willem-Alexander and Prime Minister Dick Schoof
18	4 December 2024	Latvia	Riga		Meeting with Latvian President Edgars Rinkevics
19	9 December 2024	Vatican City	Vatican City		Meeting with Pope Francis

== Multilateral meetings ==
Group	Year	
Group	2024	2025
UNGA	24–27 September, (United States) New York City	September, (United States) New York City
NATO	9–11 July, (United States) Washington, D.C.	24–25 June, (Netherlands) The Hague
██ = Future event ██ = Did not attend / participate.
