= List of international presidential trips made by Bernardo Arévalo =

This is a list of international presidential trips made by Bernardo Arévalo, the 52nd and current President of Guatemala since 15 January 2024. According to the country's Constitution, during President Arévalo's absence, Vice President Karin Herrera served as acting president.

== Summary ==
The number of visits per country where President Arévalo traveled are:

- One visit to Canada, Costa Rica, Dominican Republic, France, Germany, Honduras, Italy, Japan, Panama, Spain, Switzerland, Taiwan, Uruguay and Vatican City
- Two visits to Belgium
- Three visits to Mexico
- Four visits to the United States

== 2024 ==
| No. | Country | Areas visited | Date(s) | Notes |
|---|---|---|---|---|
| 1 | Germany | Munich | 15–19 February | Participated in the Munich Security Conference. Met with German Chancellor Olaf Scholz and Ukrainian President Volodymyr Zelenskyy. |
| 1 | France | Paris | 19–20 February | Working visit. Met with President Emmanuel Macron and Director-General of UNESCO Audrey Azoulay. |
| 1 | Belgium | Brussels | 20–21 February | Working visit. Met with President of the European Council Charles Michel. |
| 1 | Switzerland | Geneva and Lausanne | 21 February | Met in Geneva with United Nations High Commissioner for Human Rights Volker Türk. Met in Lausanne with President of the International Olympic Committee Thomas Bach. |
| 1 | Spain | Madrid | 22–23 February | Official visit. Met with King Felipe VI and Prime Minister Pedro Sánchez. |
| 2 | United States | Washington, D.C. | 24–27 March | Working visit. Met with President Joe Biden. |
| 3 | Mexico | Tapachula | 17 May | Working visit. Met with President Andrés Manuel López Obrador. |
| 4 | United States | New York City; Washington, D.C. | 3–4 June | Meeting with UN Secretary-General António Guterres and OAS Secretary-General Luis Almagro. |
| 5 | Dominican Republic | Santiago de los Caballeros; Punta Cana | 14–17 August | Attended the inauguration ceremony of Luis Abinader. |
| 6 | United States | New York City | 22–26 September | Addressed the general debate of the seventy-ninth session of the United Nations General Assembly. |
| 7 | Mexico | Mexico City | 30 September–2 October | Attended the inauguration ceremony of Claudia Sheinbaum. |

== 2025 ==
| No. | Country | Areas visited | Date(s) | Notes |
|---|---|---|---|---|
| 8 | Canada | Toronto | 27–28 January | Met with Minister of International Development Ahmed Hussen. |
| 9 | Uruguay | Montevideo | 28 February–3 March | Attended the inauguration ceremony of Yamandú Orsi. |
| 10 | Honduras | Tegucigalpa | 9 April | Attended the 9th CELAC summit. |
| 11 | Taiwan | Taipei | 4–8 June | Met with president Lai Ching-te and reaffirmed Guatemala's support for Taiwan, and vowed to continue to strengthen the ties between both nations. |
| 11 | Japan | Tokyo | 8–12 June | Official visit. Met with Prime Minister Shigeru Ishiba and Emperor Naruhito. |
| 12 | United States | New York City | 23–25 September | Addressed the General debate of the eightieth session of the United Nations General Assembly. |
| 13 | Belgium | Brussels | 9–10 October | Participation in the Global Gateway Forum. |
| 13 | Italy | Rome | 11 October | Visited the tomb of Pope Francis in Santa Maria Maggiore. |
| 13 | Vatican City | Vatican City | 11 October | Met with Pope Leo XIV. |

== 2026 ==
| No. | Country | Areas visited | Date(s) | Notes |
|---|---|---|---|---|
| 14 | Panama | Panama City | 27–29 January | Participated in the International Economic Forum for Latin America and the Caribbean. |
| 15 | Costa Rica | San Jose | 7–8 May | Attended the inauguration ceremony of Laura Fernández Delgado. |

== Multilateral meetings ==
Multilateral meetings of the following intergovernmental organizations took place during Bernardo Arévalo's presidency (2024–Present).

| Group | Year | | |
| Group | 2024 | 2025 | 2026 |
|---|---|---|---|
| UNGA | 24 September, (United States) New York City | 23–25 September, (United States) New York City | TBD, (United States) New York City |
| EU–CELAC | None | November, (Colombia) Santa Marta | None |
██ = Future event.

== See also ==
- Foreign relations of Guatemala
