= List of international presidential trips made by Heydar Aliyev =

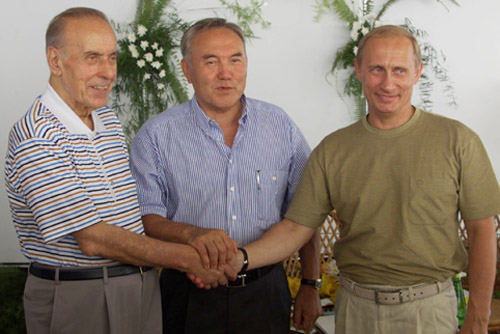
Aliyev, Kazakh President Nursultan Nazarbayev and Russian President Vladimir Putin in Sochi in 2001.

Heydar Aliyev, the third President of Azerbaijan, made many international official and work trips during the terms of his presidency.

== First Presidential term ==
Trips during the first presidential term (1993–1998):

Date	Country	City	Details
December 19–21, 1993	France	Paris	State visit
February 8–11, 1994	Turkey	Ankara	State visit
February 22–25, 1994	(United Kingdom) UK	London	Official visit
March 7–11, 1994	China	Beijing	State visit
May 3–5, 1994	Belgium	Brussels	State visit
June 29 – July 2, 1994	Iran	Tehran	State visit
July 9–12, 1994	Saudi Arabia	Riyadh	State visit
September 26, 1994	USA	New York City	Working visit
October 18–19, 1994	Turkey	Istanbul	Working visit
December 13, 1994	Morocco	Rabat	Working visit
May 8, 1995	France	Paris	50th anniversary of Victory Day.
May 9, 1995	Russia	Moscow	1995 Moscow Victory Day Parades.
June 29–30, 1995	Bulgaria	Sofia	State visit
June 30 – July 2, 1995	Romania	Bucharest	State visit
August 1995	Kyrgyzstan	Bishkek	Working visit
December 1995	France	Paris	Working visit
January 10–11, 1996	France	Paris	State funeral of François Mitterrand.
March 8–10, 1996	Georgia	Tbilisi	State visit
April 9–11, 1996	Pakistan	Islamabad	State visit
July 1–4, 1996	Germany	Berlin	State visit
January 13–15, 1997	France	Paris	State visit
March 24–25, 1997	Ukraine	Kyiv	State visit
May 5–8, 1997	Turkey	Ankara	State visit
June 10–11, 1997	Kazakhstan	Astana	State visit
July 18–19, 1997	Uzbekistan	Tashkent	State visit
July 2–4, 1997	Russia	Moscow	State visit
July 27 – August 7, 1997	USA	Washington New York City Houston Chicago	Official visit
August 26–28, 1997	Poland	Warsaw	State visit
September 25–28, 1997	Italy	Rome	State visit
February 23–28, 1998	Japan	Tokyo	State visit
July 19–24, 1998	(United Kingdom) UK	London	Official visit. Met with Elizabeth II and Tony Blair.

== Second Presidential term ==
Trips during the second presidential term (1998–2003):

Date	Country	Location	Details
October 28-21, 1998	Turkey	Ankara	75th anniversary of Republic of Turkey.
October 31 – November 2, 1999	Turkey	Ankara	Working visit
November 18–19, 1999	Turkey	Istanbul	1999 Istanbul summit
March 22–23, 2000	Georgia	Tbilisi	State visit
April 23–26, 1999	USA	Washington, D.C.	1999 Washington summit
February 12–21, 2000	USA	Washington, D.C.	Private visit
July, 3-6, 2000	Austria	Vienna	State visit
January 23–28, 2001	France	Paris	State visit
March 12–16, 2001	Turkey	Ankara	State visit
April 3–11, 2001	USA	Key West Washington, D.C.	Meeting with Robert Kocharyan
November 30, 2001	Russia	Moscow	Meeting with Robert Kocharyan
January 24–26, 2002	Russia	Moscow	State visit
April 29–30, 2002	Turkey	Trabzon	Working visit
May 18–20, 2002	Iran	Tehran	State visit
February 23–27, 2003	USA	Washington, D.C.	Working visit

== See also ==
- List of presidential trips made by Ilham Aliyev
- List of international presidential trips made by Recep Tayyip Erdoğan
