= Roble Olhaye =

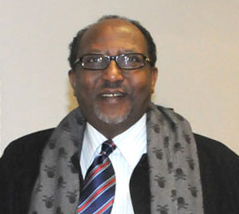

Permanent Representative to the UN for the Republic of Djibouti
- In office 1988–2015
- President: Hassan Gouled Aptidon; Ismaïl Omar Guelleh

Djiboutian Ambassador to the United States
- In office 1988–2015
- President: Hassan Gouled Aptidon; Ismaïl Omar Guelleh
- Preceded by: Saleh Farah Dirir
- Succeeded by: Mohamed Siad Doualeh

Djibouti Ambassador to Canada (non-resident)
- In office 1989–2015
- President: Hassan Gouled Aptidon; Ismaïl Omar Guelleh

Personal details
- Born: 24 April 1944
- Died: 22 July 2015 (aged 71) New York City, New York, U.S.

Roble Olhaye (24 April 1944 – 22 July 2015) was the Permanent Representative to the United Nations for the Republic of Djibouti. He was the Permanent Representative to the United Nations and Ambassador of Djibouti to the United States from 1988 until his death in 2015. In 1989, Olhaye was appointed as non-resident Ambassador to Canada. He was married and had five children. He was, at the time of his death, the longest-serving ambassador to the United States and consequently held the post of Dean of the Diplomatic Corps.

== Education ==
Olhaye obtained an Intermediate Diploma in Commerce from the Addis Ababa Commercial College. After studying in the field of accounting, finance, taxation, law and management, he received qualification as a professional accountant in England. He was a Fellow of the Association of International Accountants (UK) and a member of the British Institute of Management.

== Career ==
After being appointed as the Permanent Representative to the United Nations, Olhaye represented Djibouti in the Security Council, served as its President in February 1994 and Chairman of the Sanctions Committee established by United Nations Security Council Resolution 841 on Haiti. While a member of the Security Council Mission to Mozambique, he helped in the process of democratic elections held in 1994. As Dean of the African diplomatic corps in Washington D.C., he received one of Djibouti’s highest medals of honor awards for improving how the nation was viewed internationally.

Prior to his appointment to the Permanent Representative post, he served as Djibouti’s Permanent Representative to the United Nations Environment Programme (UNEP) and United Nations Centre for Human Settlements (Habitat). He also served as Honorary Consul of Djibouti to Kenya and established ongoing diplomatic relations between the two nations. He has also worked in the private sector on commerce, finance, and management.

== See also ==
- List of current permanent representatives to the United Nations
