= Rwanda Space Agency =

Space agency of the Rwandan government

The Rwanda Space Agency (RSA) is Rwanda's agency for aerospace research and economic development. Its responsibilities include advising the government of Rwanda on space policies, to implement those policies, to promote Rwanda's aerospace industry, and to conduct aerospace research. It was established in 2021.

== History ==
In 2017, the Rwanda Utilities Regulatory Authority (RURA) and Rwanda's Ministry of Defense created a Space Working Group. This coordinated and promoted the various aerospace projects around the country culminating in the launch of Rwanda's first satellite, RWASAT-1, in 2019 through the Japan Aerospace and Exploration Agency (JAXA).

Since the RSA was established, Rwanda has rapidly grown its ambitions. In October of 2021, the RSA requested orbital slots for almost 330,000 satellites. In 2022, its CEO, Col. Francis Ngabo, signed the Artemis Accords on the norms for space exploration and use of astronomical objects.

== Earth Observation Program ==
Much of the RSA's activity involves earth observation. This includes greenhouse gas monitoring, disaster management, and economic and social development.

Rwanda's first satellite, RWASAT-1, monitored soil moisture levels and provided data for crop yield estimates as a part of the RSA's economic development initiative. Its second, nicknamed Icyerekezo, helped provide satellite internet service to the remote Nkombo Island on Lake Kivu.

In 2022, the RSA took charge of the Rwanda Climate Observatory. It now monitors the emissions of six greenhouse gases.
