= Senegalese Space Study Agency =

The Senegalese Space Study Agency(ASES) is Senegal's national space program which was inaugurated on 23 March 2023 by Macky Sall. He had launched the agency before the documentary premiere, ‘Nova: Star Chasers of Senegal’. Maram Kairé, who has led three missions for NASA before, is the director of agency. They are also active member of the GMES & Africa initiative. The Senegalese Space Study Agency also has partnerships with the Turkish Space Agency, ESA, and China’s ILRS Moon project.

== 2023-Present ==
Senegal's first satellite, the GaindéSat‑1A, was launched on 16 August 2024 from Vandenberg Space Force Base, US. It was developed between Senegal and the University Space Centre of Montpellier.

In acknowledgment of this, President Bassirou Diomaye Diakhar Faye said “Senegal is entering a new era today with the successful launch of our first satellite, GAINDESAT-1A, at exactly 6:56 p.m. from the Vandenberg base in California. The result of 5 years of hard work by our engineers and technicians, this breakthrough marks a major step towards our technological sovereignty. I would like to express my pride and gratitude to all those who made this project possible.”

Senegal also became the 56th country to sign the Artemis Accords and the 4th African country to do it.
