= List of international presidential trips made by Ilham Aliyev =

This article consists of the list of international official and work trips made by Ilham Aliyev, the fourth and current President of Azerbaijan, during the terms of his presidency.

== First Presidential term ==
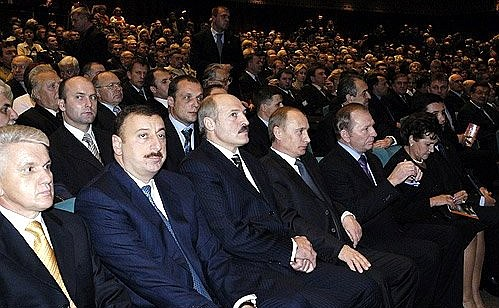
Aliyev with Alexander Lukashenko, and Vladimir Putin in Kyiv in October 27, 2004.

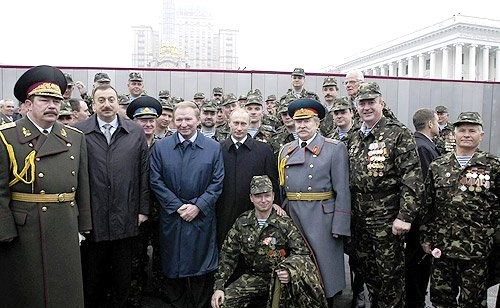
Aliyev (second from the left) with Leonid Kuchma, Vladimir Putin and veterans of the Liberation of Ukraine in October 28, 2024.

Trips during the first presidential term (2003–2008)

Date	Country	Location	Details
January 2004	France	Paris	Signing agreements on civil defense, aeronautics, scientific cooperation, tourism, etc. between Azerbaijan and France
February 2004	Russia	Moscow	Development of cooperation in all directions
March 2004	Uzbekistan	Tashkent	Signing of 8 agreements in the field of economy, transport, military cooperation
March 2004	Kazakhstan	Astana	Discussion of the Baku-Tbilisi-Ceyhan project
March 2004	Slovakia	Bratislava	Development of bilateral cooperation between the EU and Azerbaijan
April 2004	Turkey	Ankara	The opening of a park near Ankara, in Batikent, in memory of Heydar Aliyev. Signing of protocols on cooperation in the spheres of civil aviation and culture and other documents
April 2004	Poland	Warsaw	European Economic Summit
April 2004	France	Strasbourg	PACE session
May 2004	Belgium	Brussels	Development of bilateral cooperation between the EU and Azerbaijan
June 2004	Turkey	Istanbul	17th NATO summit
June 2004	Ukraine	Kyiv	Development of bilateral relations between countries
June 2004	Georgia	Tbilisi	Signing of Azerbaijani-Georgian documents
July 2004	Russia	Moscow	Development of bilateral relations between countries
August 2004	Germany	Berlin	Development of bilateral relations between countries
August 2004	Greece	Athens	2004 Summer Olympics
September 2004	France	Paris	Development of bilateral relations between countries
September 2004	Kazakhstan	Astana	Meeting with the Presidents of Russia and Armenia
September 2004	USA	New York	UN General Assembly 59th Session
October 2004	Romania	Bucharest	Signing of Azerbaijani-Romanian documents
October 2004	Russia	Moscow	Meeting with the President of Russia
October 2004	Ukraine	Kyiv	Victory Parade on the Occasion of the 60th Anniversary of the Liberation of Ukraine from Fascism
November 2004	Qatar	Doha	Signing of Azerbaijani-Qatarian documents
December 2004	(United Kingdom) UK	London	Conference on "Trade and Investments in Azerbaijan"
January 2005	Iran	Tabriz	Signing of ten documents
February 2005	Russia	Moscow	Meeting with the President of Russia and opening the "Year of Azerbaijan" in Russia
February 2005	Italy	Rome	Azerbaijani-Italian business forum
March 2005	Saudi Arabia	Riyadh	Development of bilateral relations between countries
March 2005	China	Beijing	Signing of documents covering political, legal, economic, cultural spheres
March 2005	Poland	Warsaw	Consideration of political, economic and humanitarian relations, as well as the development of relations within international structures
April 2005	Vatican		Funeral of Pope John Paul II
April 2005	Pakistan	Islamabad	Development of bilateral relations between countries
April 2005	Moldova	Chișinău	Development of bilateral relations between countries
May 2005	Russia	Moscow	The parade on Red Square on the occasion of Victory Day, on the 60th anniversary of the end of the Great Patriotic War
May 2005	Poland	Warsaw	Meeting of the Heads of State of Europe
June 2005	Croatia	Zagreb	Signing of Azerbaijani- Croatian documents
June 2005	Russia	St. Petersburg	Petersburg International Economic Forum
June 2005	Ukraine	Kyiv	International Investment Forum
August 2005	Saudi Arabia		The funeral of King Fahd ibn Abdul-Aziz Al Saud
August 2005	Subject of the Russian Federation, Republic of Tatarstan	Kazan	Meeting of CIS Heads of State
September 2005	Bulgaria	Sofia	The signing of the Joint Declaration of the Presidents
October 2005	Georgia		Launch of the Georgian part of the Baku-Tbilisi-Ceyhan pipeline
December 2005	Saudi Arabia	Mecca	Summit of the Organization of Islamic Cooperation
February 2006	France	Rambouillet	Meeting with the President of Armenia and OSCE Minsk Group
March 2006	Japan	Tokyo	Signing of Azerbaijani-Japanese documents
March 2006	France	Rambouillet	The NATO Parliamentary Assembly
April 2006	USA	Washington	Discussion of issues of democracy, energy and cooperation in the Caucasus, as well as security issues
May 2006	Ukraine	Kyiv	GUAM session
May 2006	France	Paris	NATO Parliamentary Assembly
June 2006	Romania	Bucharest	Development of bilateral relations between countries
June 2006	Kazakhstan	Astana	The signing of the Agreement on the facilitation and support of oil transportation from Kazakhstan through the Caspian Sea and the territory of Azerbaijan to international markets through the Baku-Tbilisi-Ceyhan system
July 2006	Turkey	Ceyhan	Opening of the Baku-Tbilisi-Ceyhan oil pipeline
July 2006	Russia	Moscow	Meeting of heads of states of the CIS
August 2006	Slovenia	Ljubljana	Exchange of views on the current state and prospects of bilateral economic ties between countries
September 2006	Turkey	Istanbul	Development of bilateral relations between countries
September 2006	Germany	Berlin	Participation in the International Forum Bertelsmann-2006
September 2006	Turkey	Antalya	Meeting of the heads of Turc-speang states
October 2006	Latvia	Riga	Discussion of cooperation within the framework of international organizations, interaction in the field of integration into Euro-Atlantic structures
October 2006	Belarus	Minsk	Discussion of the prospects for political and economic relations between the two states. The signing of a package of ten documents
November 2006	Russia	Moscow	Development of bilateral relations between countries
November 2006	Belgium	Brussels	Signing with Europe a memorandum in the energy sector
November 2006	United Arab Emirates	Abu Dhabi	Azerbaijani-Emirates business forum
November 2006	Belarus	Minsk	Meeting with the Presidents of Belarus and Ukraine
January 2007	France	Lille	The signing of the Memorandum and 7 bilateral agreements
January 2007	Switzerland	Davos	World Economic Forum
February 2007	Georgia	Tbilisi	Solemn opening of Heydar Aliyev Avenue
February 2007	Germany	Berlin	Negotiations and discussions of various topics
February 2007	Germany	Bonn	Meeting with Chancellor Angela Merkel
March 2007	Tajikistan	Dushanbe	The signing of agreements on friendship and cooperation
March 2007	Russia	Moscow	Mstislav Rostropovich's 80th anniversary
April 2007	Russia	Moscow	Mstislav Rostropovich's funeral
April 2007	South Korea	Seoul	Signing more than 40 documents, which have established a legal basis for the development of political, economic, cultural, humanitarian relations
May 2007	Georgia	Tbilisi	Opening of the bust of Heydar Aliyev
May 2007	Egypt	Cairo	Signing of Azerbaijani-Egyptian documents
May 2007	Poland	Kraków	International energy summit
June 2007	Russia	St.Petersburg	Meeting of heads of states of the CIS
June 2007	Turkey	Istanbul	Conference on energy security
June 2007	Russia	Rostov on Non	Meeting with the president of Russia
July 2007	Jordan	Amman	Signing of 15 cooperation agreements
August 2007	Kazakhstan	Astana	Signing of the Joint Declaration on cooperation in the spheres of trade and television
September 2007	Lithuania	Vilnius	Vilnius Conference on Energy Security 2007
September 2007	Romania	Bucharest	Opening of the park in honor of Heydar Aliyev
October 2007	Tajikistan	Dushanbe	Meeting of heads of states of the CIS
October 2007	Lithuania	Vilnius	Energy Summit
October 2007	Iran	Tehran	Development of bilateral relations between countries
November 2007	Turkey		Opening of Turkey-Greece pipeline
November 2007	France	Paris	Development of bilateral relations between countries
November 2007	Georgia	Tbilisi	Signing of the agreement on the construction of the railway Baku-Tbilisi-Kars
January 2008	Switzerland	Davos	World Economic Forum
February 2008	Russia	Moscow	Meeting of CIS Heads of State
February 2008	Poland	Warsaw	Signing of documents on cooperation between countries
March 2008	Morocco	Rabat	Signing agreements on cooperation in the field of culture and tourism
April 2008	Romania	Bucharest	NATO Summit
May 2008	Ukraine	Kyiv	Energy, military-technical and humanitarian cooperation
May 2008	Finland	Helsinki	Development of relations between Azerbaijan and Finland, also with the European Union
June 2008	Russia	St.Petersburg	Summit of CIS heads of state
July 2008	Kazakhstan	Astana	Solemn events dedicated to the 10th anniversary of Astana
July 2008	Georgia	Batumi	GUAM summit
August 2008	China	Beijing	Opening of the Days of Azerbaijan in Beijing during the 29th Olympic Games
September 2008	Russia	Moscow	Meeting with the President of Russia

== Second Presidential term ==
Trips during the second presidential term (2008–2013)

Date	Country	Location	Details
November 2008	Turkey	Ankara	Speech at the Great National Assembly of Turkey, took part in the opening of Heydar Aliyev Street in Batikent, got acquainted with Heydar Aliyev Park and Heydar Aliyev Primary School
November 2008	Russia	Moscow	Meeting with the Presidents of Russia and Armenia
November 2008	Italy	Rome	Discussion of the prospects for cooperation between Italy and Azerbaijan
November 2008	Turkmenistan	Ashgabat	Turkmen-Azerbaijani-Turkish summit
January 2009	Hungary	Budapest	
January 2009	Switzerland	Zurich	Meeting with the President of Armenia
February 2009	Kuwait	Kuwait city	Expanding of cooperation
February 2009	Greece	Athens	Development of political, economic, energy spheres between countries
March 2009	Iran	Tehran	Signing of 7 intergovernmental agreements
April 2009	Russia	Moscow	The discussion of bilateral relations in the trade-economic, energy, cultural and humanitarian spheres
April 2009	Belgium	Brussels	Meeting with the Secretary General of NATO
May 2009	Czech Republic	Prague	
June 2009	Russia	St.Petersburg	Meeting with the Presidents of Russia and Armenia
July 2009	UK	London	Development of bilateral relations between countries
July 2009	Russia	Moscow	Meeting with the Presidents of Russia and Armenia
September 2009	Kazakhstan	Astana	Discussion of cooperation in the oil and gas sector
September 2009	Romania	Bucharest	Cooperation between countries in the field of economy and energy
October 2009	Moldova	Chișinău	Meeting of the Council of the CIS heads of state
October 2009	Jordan	Amman	Development of bilateral relations in various directions
October 2009	Switzerland	Berne	The opening of the Days of Azerbaijani Culture
November 2009	Bulgaria	Sofia	Signing of Azerbaijani-Bulgarian documents
November 2009	Germany	Munich	Development of bilateral relations between countries
November 2009	Belarus	Minsk	Signing of joint declarations
November 2009	Russia	Ulyanovsk	Opening of the Heydar Aliyev Square, also discussion of cooperation issues
December 2009	France	Paris	Meeting with Jean-François Cirelli, vice-president and general operations director of GDF SUEZ
January 2010	Russia	Sochi	Meeting with the Presidents of Russia and Armenia
January 2010	Switzerland	Davos	Development of economic and energy spheres, cooperation within the Nabucco project
February 2010	Germany	Berlin	Meeting with Angela Merkel
April 2010	Estonia	Tallinn	Development of bilateral relations in various directions
May 2010	Russia	Moscow	The parade on Red Square on the occasion of Victory Day, on the 65th anniversary of the end of the Great Patriotic War
June 2010	Russia	St.Petersburg	Meeting with the Presidents of Russia and Armenia and OSCE Minsk Group
June 2010	Turkey	Ankara	Signing agreements in the Energy Field
July 2010	Ukraine	Yalta	Meeting of the CIS Council of Heads of State
July 2010	Georgia	Tbilisi	The development of bilateral relations and an intergovernmental commission
September 2010	Turkey	Istanbul	Summit of heads of Turkic-speaking countries
September 2010	USA	New York	The 65th session of the UN General Assembly, discussion of regional and international issues with Barack Obama
September 2010	Uzbekistan	Tashkent	The opening of a cultural center named after Heydar Aliyev
October 2010	Russia	Astrakhan	Meeting with the Presidents of Russia and Armenia
October 2010	Ukraine	Kyiv	Development of the energy industry
November 2010	Portugal	Lisbon	NATO summit
December 2010	Kazakhstan	Astana	OSCE Summit
December 2010	Russia	Moscow	Meeting of the Council of Heads of State
December 2010	Turkey	Istanbul	XI Summit of the Economic Cooperation Organization
January 2011	Latvia	Riga	Azerbaijan-Latvia Business Forum
January 2011	Switzerland	Davos	Annual World Economic Forum
June 2011	Italy	Rome	A festive ceremony dedicated to the 150th anniversary of the unification of Italy and the Republic Day
June 2011	Serbia	Belgrade	Opening of the embassy of Azerbaijan in Serbia, signing Azerbaijani-Serbian documents
June 2011	Slovenia	Ljubljana	Azerbaijani-Slovenian Business Forum
June 2011	Belgium	Brussels	Cooperation between Azerbaijan and the European Union, opening the Crans Montana Forum
June 2011	(Russia) Tatarstan	Kazan	Meeting with the Presidents of Russia and Armenia
August 2011	Russia	Sochi	Meeting with the President of the Russian Federation
September 2011	Poland	Warsaw	Participation in the European Union “Eastern Partnership” summit
October 2011	Kazakhstan	Almaty	Participation in the First Summit of the Cooperation Council of Turkic Speaking States
October 2011	Turkey	Izmir	The opening of the AYPE-T plant, the laying of the foundations of the Heydar Aliyev Lyceum of Professional Education and the Petkim Petroleum Refinery
December 2011	Russia	Moscow	Meeting of the Council of the CIS heads of state
January 2012	Russia	Sochi	Meeting with the Presidents of Russia and Armenia
January 2012	Switzerland	Davos	Annual World Economic Forum
February 2012	Germany	Munich	48th Munich Security Conference
March 2012	South Korea	Seoul	Seoul Nuclear Security Summit
April 2012	Czech Republic	Prague	Signing of Azerbaijani-Czech documents
May 2012	USA	New York	20th anniversary of Azerbaijan's membership in the United Nations, and the meeting of the UN Security Council
May 2012	Russia		Meeting of the CIS Council of Heads of State
May 2012	USA	Chicago	NATO Summit
June 2012	Turkey	Istanbul	Participation in a summit on the occasion of the 20th anniversary of the Black Sea Economic Cooperation Organization
July 2012	UK	London	Opening the ceremony of “Day of Azerbaijan” during the 30th Summer Games in London
September 2012	France	Paris	Opening of the Center of Azerbaijani Culture in Paris, also development of business and culture.
November 2012	Singapore	Singapore city	Development of relations between countries
January 2013	Switzerland	Davos	Annual World Economic Forum
March 2013	Croatia	Zagreb	Signing a declaration of partnership and friendship
March 2013	Montenegro	Podgorica	Signing of bilateral documents
May 2013	Belgium	Brussels	Development of relations with European Council
June 2013	Austria	Vienna	Austro-Azerbaijan Business Forum, also meetings with UN directors in various fields

== Third Presidential term ==
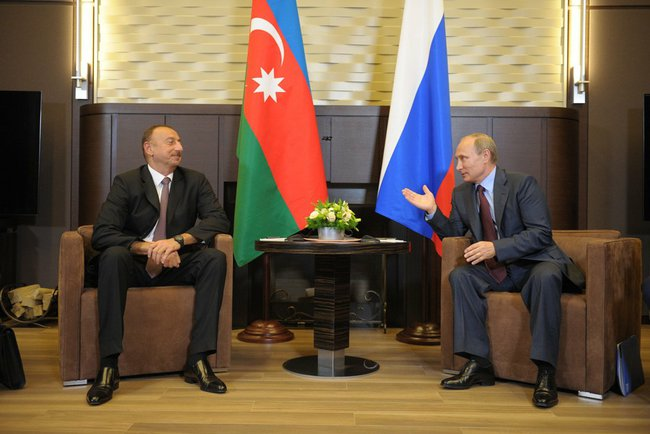
Aliyev with Vladimir Putin in Sochi in August 2014.

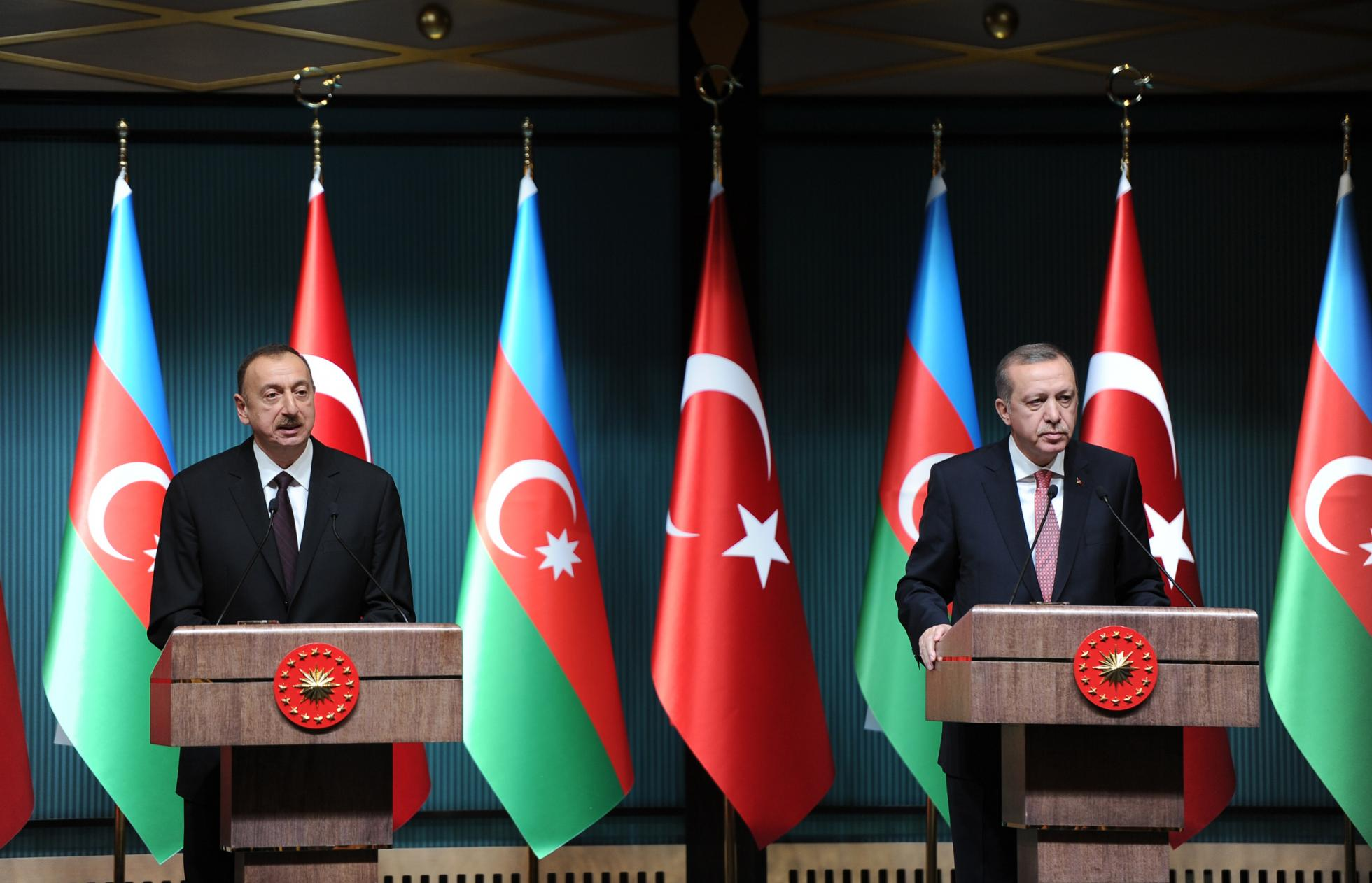
Aliyev with Recep Tayyip Erdoğan in Ankara in January 2015.

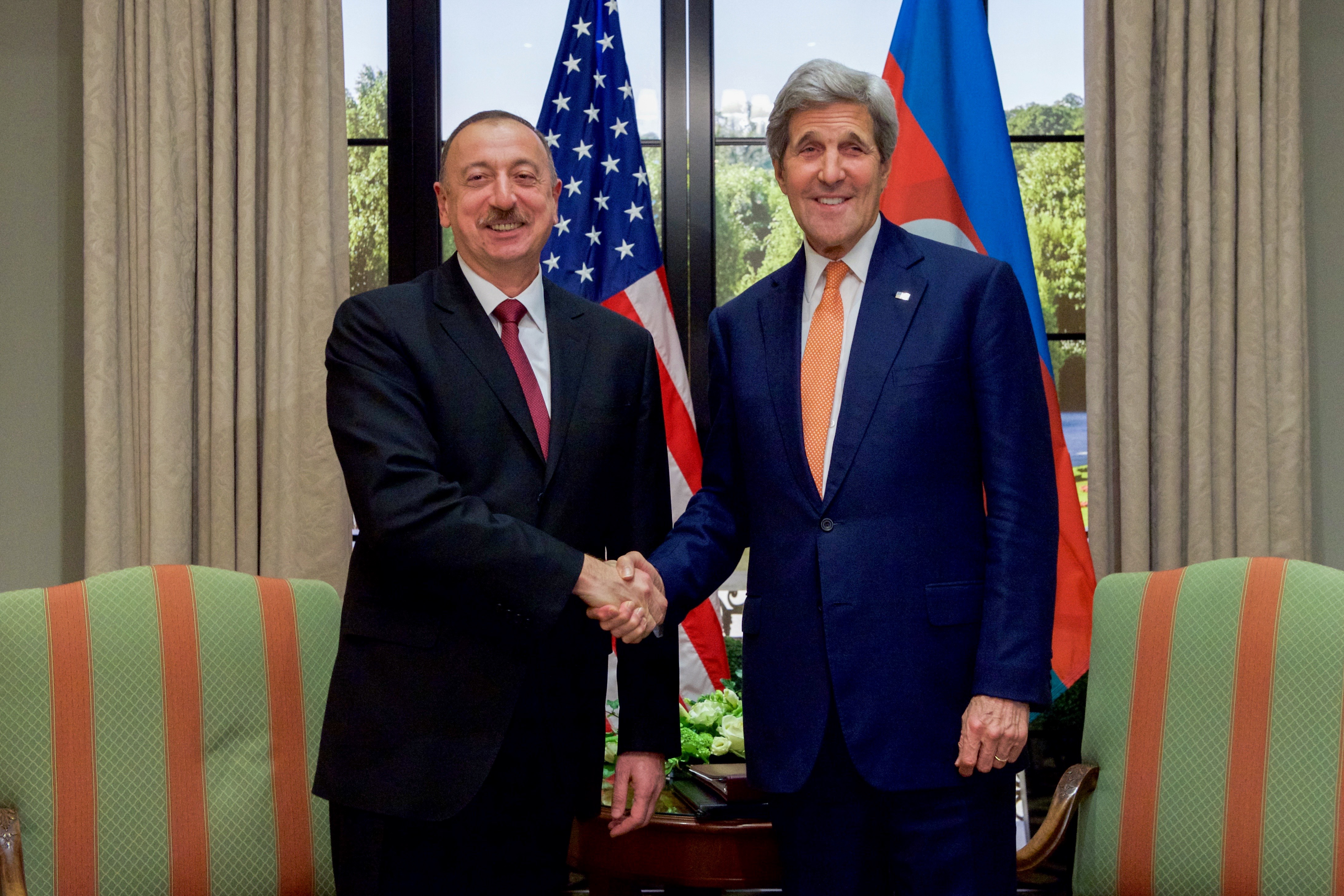
U.S. Secretary of State John Kerry shakes hands with Aliyev on May 16, 2016, at the Bristol Hotel in Vienna, Austria.

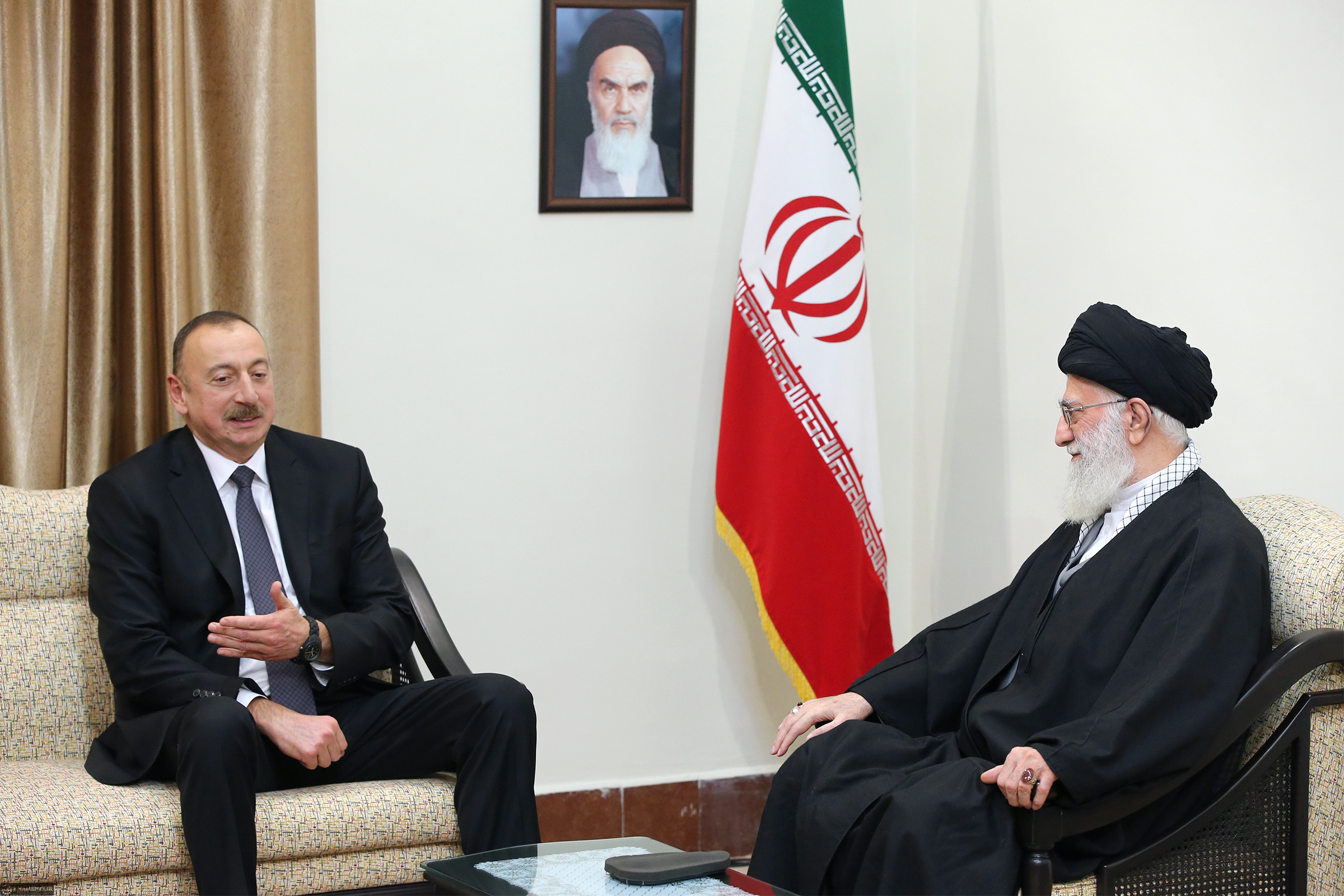
Aliyev with Ali Khamenei – March 5, 2017.

Trips during the third presidential term (2013–2018)

Date	Country	Location	Details
October 2013	Belarus	Minsk	Meeting of the Council of the CIS Heads of State
November 2013	Turkey	Ankara	Signing of intergovernmental documents
November 2013	Austria	Vienna	Meeting with the Presidents of Austria and Armenia
November 2013	Ukraine	Kyiv	Signing of Azerbaijani-Ukrainian documents
November 2013	Lithuania	Vilnius	3rd Eastern Partnership Summit of the European Union
January 2014	Switzerland	Davos	Annual World Economic Forum
February 2014	Russia	Sochi	The opening ceremony of the XXII Winter Olympic Games
April 2014	Iran	Tehran	Signing of Azerbaijani-Iranian documents
April 2014	Czech Republic	Prague	The summit of the EU "Eastern Partnership" program
May 2014	Georgia	Tbilisi	Summit of the Presidents of Azerbaijan, Turkey and Georgia
May 2014	Vietnam	Hanoi	Signing of Azerbaijani-Vietnamese documents
May 2014	China	Shanghai	4th Summit of the Conference on Interaction and Confidence Building Measures in Asia
June 2014	Turkey	Bodrum	Fourth Summit of the Cooperation Council of Turkic-speaking States
June 2014	Greece	Athens	Signing of Azerbaijani-Greek documents
June 2014	France	Strasbourg	Parliamentary Assembly of the Council of Europe
July 2014	Italy	Rome	Signing of Azerbaijani-Italian documents
August 2014	Russia	Sochi	Meeting with the Presidents of Russia and Armenia
September 2014	UK	Wales	NATO summit
September 2014	Russia	Astrakhan	4th summit of the heads of state of the Caspian littoral states
October 2014	Belarus	Minsk	The meeting of the CIS Council of Heads of State
October 2014	Tajikistan	Dushanbe	Signing of Azerbaijani-Tajik documents
October 2014	France	Paris	Meeting with the President of France
November 2014	Hungary	Budapest	Signing of Azerbaijan-Hungary documents
January 2015	Germany	Berlin	Azerbaijani-German Forum
February 2015	Germany	Munich	51st Munich Security Conference
March 2015	Turkey	Kars	Trans-Anatolian Gas Line Groundbreaking
April 2015	Turkey	Chanakkale	100th anniversary of Chanakkale Victory
April 2015	Saudi Arabia	Riyadh	Development of bilateral relations in various directions
May 9, 2015	Russia	Moscow	Attended the 2015 Moscow Victory Day Parade
July 2015	Italy	Milano	"National day" organized at the Azerbaijan's pavilion in the "Expo Milano 2015" international exhibition
September 2015	Kazakhstan	Astana	5th Summit of the Cooperation Council of Turkic Speaking States
October 2015	Kazakhstan	Burabay	CIS Heads of State Council's session
November 2015	Georgia	Tbilisi	Strengthening of relations between countries
November 2015	Turkey	Antalya	Speech during the discussions on the fight against terrorism and the migration crisis at a working dinner in the framework of the G20 Summit
November 2015	France	Paris	38th Session of UNESCO General Conference
November 2015	Belarus	Minsk	Signing of Azerbaijani-Belarusian documents
December 2015	China	Xian	Signing of Azerbaijani-Chinese documents
January 2016	Switzerland	Davos	Annual World Economic Forum
February 2016	United Arab Emirates	Abu Dhabi	Signing of Azerbaijani-UAE documents
February 2016	UK	London	Supporting Syria and the Region Conference
February 2016	Germany	Munich	Munich Security Conference
February 2016	Iran	Tehran	Signing of Azerbaijani-Iranian documents
March 2016	Turkey	Ankara	Signing of Azerbaijani-Turkish documents
April 2016	USA	Washington	4th Nuclear Security Summit
April 2016	Turkey	Istanbul	13th Summit of the Organization of Islamic Cooperation
May 2016	Austria	Vienna	Meeting with the US Secretary of State John Kerry, Russian Foreign Minister Sergei Lavrov, French Minister of State for European Affairs Harlem Desir, Presidents of Armenia, Serzh Sargsyan, OSCE Minsk group co-chairs, and special representative of the OSCE
May 2016	Turkey	Istanbul	World Humanitarian Summit
June 2016	Germany	Berlin	Azerbaijani-German Economic Forum
June 2016	Russia	St.Petersburg	Meeting with the Presidents of Russia and Armenia
July 2016	Poland	Warsaw	NATO Summit
September 2016	Kyrgyzstan	Bishkek	Meeting CIS Council of Heads of State
October 2016	Turkey	Istanbul	23rd World Energy Congress
February 2017	Belgium	Brussels	Development of relations with the European Union
February 2017	Germany	Munich	Munich Security Conference
February 2017	Qatar	Doha	Signing of Azerbaijani-Qatarian document
March 2017	Pakistan	Islamabad	13th Summit of Economic Cooperation Organization
March 2017	Iran	Tehran	Signing of Azerbaijani-Iranian documents
March 2017	France	Paris	Signing of Azerbaijani-French documents
May 2017	Saudi Arabia	Riyadh	Arab-Islamic-American summit
June 2017	Poland	Warsaw	Signing of Azerbaijani-Poland documents
July 2017	Turkey	Istanbul	22nd World Petroleum Congress
July 2017	Latvia	Riga	Signing of Azerbaijani-Latvian documents
July 2017	Russia	Sochi	Meeting with the President of Russia
September 2017	Kazakhstan	Astana	First Summit on Science and Technology of Organization of Islamic Cooperation
September 2017	USA	New York	72nd Session of UN General Assembly and meeting with US President Donald Trump
October 2017	Russia	Sochi	Session of CIS Heads of State Council
October 2017	Swiss Confederation	Geneva	Meeting with the President of Armenia
October 2017	Turkey	Istanbul	Summit of D-8 Organization for Economic Cooperation (as a special guest)
November 2017	Iran	Tehran	Meeting with the Presidents of Iran and Russia
November 2017	Belgium	Brussels	NATO's North Atlantic Council meeting
December 2017	Turkey	Istanbul	OIC emergency summit on Jerusalem
December 2017	Russia	Moscow	Meeting of the CIS heads of state
January 2018	Switzerland	Davos	Attended the annual meeting of the World Economic Forum

== Fourth Presidential term ==
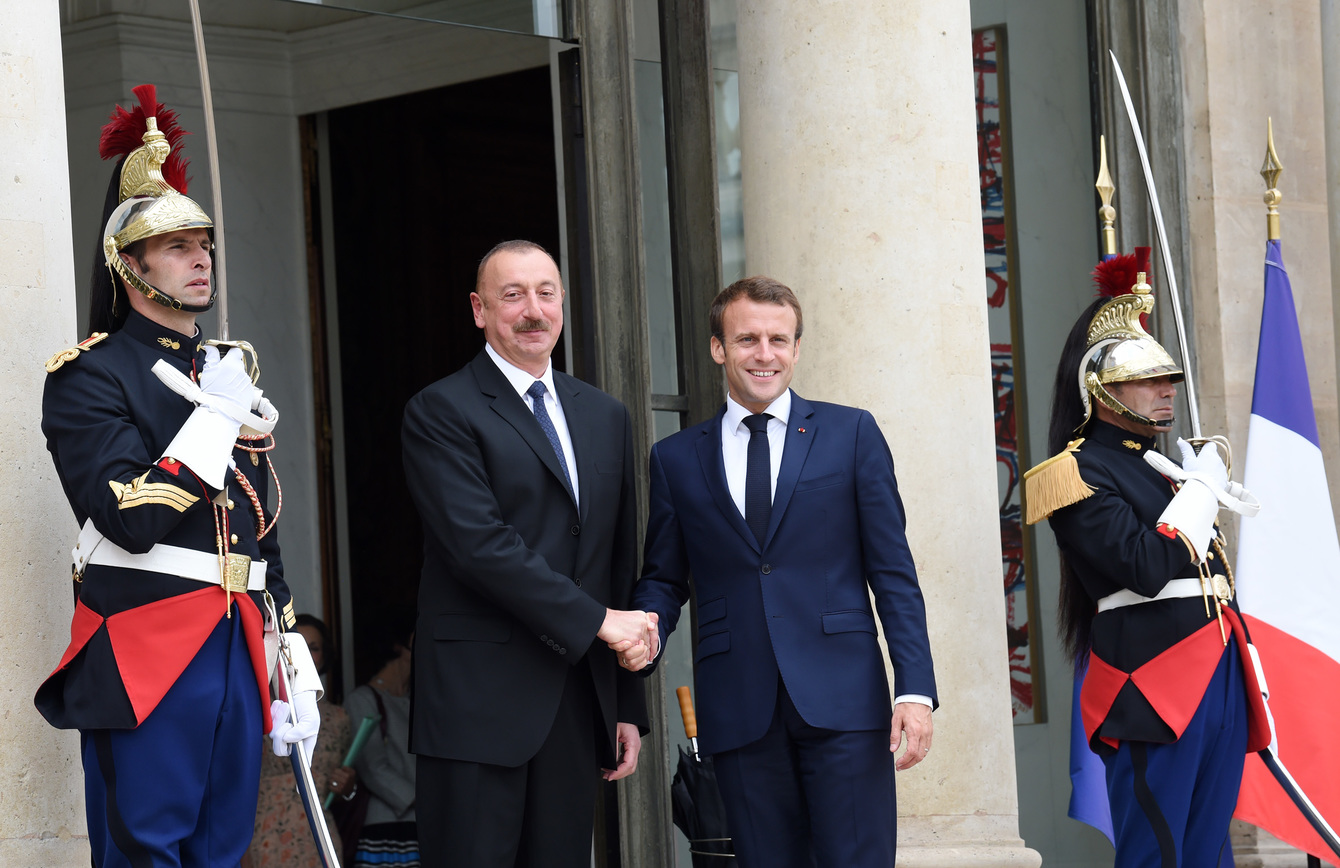
Aliyev with Emmanuel Macron in Paris in July 2018.

Trips during the fourth presidential term (2018–2024)

Date	Country	Location	Details
April 2018	Turkey	Ankara	State Visit.
June 2018	Russia	Moscow	Attended the 2018 FIFA World Cup
July 2018	Belgium	Brussels	NATO's North Atlantic Council meeting
July 2018	France	Paris	Met with Emmanuel Macron.
August 2018	Kazakhstan	Aktau	Summit of Caspian Leaders.
August 2018	Russia	Sochi	Working Visit
August 2018	Kyrgyzstan	Cholpon-Ata	Attended the 6th Turkic Council summit and the 3rd World Nomad Games.
September 2018	Tajikistan	Dushanbe	Attended the CIS summit
October 2018	Turkey	İzmir	Inaugurated the SOCAR refinery.
November 2018	Belarus	Minsk	State Visit
November 2018	Turkmenistan	Ashgabat	State Visit
December 2018	Russia	St. Petersburg	Working Visit
January 2019	Switzerland	Davos	Annual World Economic Forum
March 2019	Austria	Vienna	Meeting with the Chancellor of Austria Sebastian Kurz and the Prime Minister of Armenia Nikol Pashinyan.
April 2019	China	Beijing	Working visit
May 2019	Belgium	Brussels	Working visit
October 2019	Russia	Sochi	Working Visit
October 2019	Turkmenistan	Ashgabat	Working Visit
December 2019	Russia	St. Petersburg	Working visit
January 2020	Switzerland	Davos	Annual World Economic Forum
February 2020	Germany	Munich	Attended the Munich Security Conference
January 2021	Russia	Moscow	Working visit
July 2021	Russia	Moscow	Working visit
November 2021	Turkey	Istanbul	Working visit
November 2021	Russia	Sochi	Working visit
December 2021	Belgium	Brussels	Working visit
January 2022	Ukraine	Kyiv	Working visit
February 2022	Russia	Moscow	Working visit
March 2022	Turkey	Ankara	Working visit
April 2022	Belgium	Brussels	Working visit
May 2022	Turkey	Yeşilköy	Working visit
June 2022	Uzbekistan	Tashkent, Khiva	State visit. The opening of Heydar Aliyev Square.
June 2022	Turkmenistan	Ashgabat	Working visit
September 2022	Italy	Rome, Cernobbio	Working visit
September 2022	Uzbekistan	Samarkand	Working visit. Attended the Shanghai Cooperation Organisation summit.
October 2022	Bulgaria	Sofia	
October 2022	Czech Republic	Prague	Working visit
October 2022	Russia	St. Petersburg	Working visit
October 2022	Kyrgyzstan	Bishkek	Working visit
October 2022	Kazakhstan	Astana	Working visit
October 2022	Georgia	Tbilisi	Working visit
October 2022	Russia	Sochi	Working visit
November 2022	Uzbekistan	Samarkand	Working visit. Attended the Organization of Turkic States summit.
November 2022	Albania	Tirana	State visit.
November 2022	Serbia	Belgrade	State visit.
December 2022	Turkmenistan	Turkmenbashi	Working visit
December 2022	Romania	Bucharest	Signing of energy documents
December 2022	Russia	St. Petersburg	Working visit
January 2023	UAE	Abu Dhabi	Working visit.
January 2023	Switzerland	Davos	Attended the annual meeting of the World Economic Forum
January 2023	Hungary	Budapest	Signing of Azerbaijan-Hungary documents
February 2023	Germany	Munich	Attended the Munich Security Conference
February 2023	Turkey	Istanbul	Working visit
March 2023	Germany	Berlin	Working visit
March 2023	Turkey	Ankara	Attended the Extraordinary Summit of Heads of State of Organization of Turkic States
April 2023	Tajikistan	Dushanbe	State visit.
April 2023	Kazakhstan	Astana	Working visit
April 2023	Bosnia and Herzegovina	Sarajevo	Working visit
April 2023	Bulgaria	Sofia	Working visit.
April 2023	Turkey	Istanbul	Attended the Teknofest festival.
May 2023	Belgium	Brussels	Working visit.
May 2023	Lithuania	Vilnius	Official visit.
June 2023	Moldova	Chișinău, Bulboaca	Attended the 2nd European Political Community Summit.
June 2023	Turkey	Ankara	Third inauguration of Recep Tayyip Erdoğan.
July 2023	Belgium	Brussels	Working visit.
August 2023	Hungary	Budapest	Working visit.
September 2023	Tajikistan	Dushanbe	Participated in the 5th Consultative Meeting of Heads of Central Asian States
October 2023	Georgia	Tbilisi	Working visit.
October 2023	Kyrgyzstan	Bishkek	Attended the meeting of the CIS Council of the Heads of State.
November 2023	Kazakhstan	Astana	Attended 10th summit of the Organization of Turkic States.
November 2023	Uzbekistan	Tashkent	Attended 16th summit of Economic Cooperation Organization.
November 2023	UAE	Dubai	Attended the World Climate Action Summit organized on sidelines of COP28.
December 2023	Serbia	Niš	Attended inauguration ceremony of Serbia-Bulgaria gas interconnector.
December 2023	Russia	St. Petersburg	Working visit.

== Fifth Presidential term ==
Trips during the fifth presidential term (2024–Present)

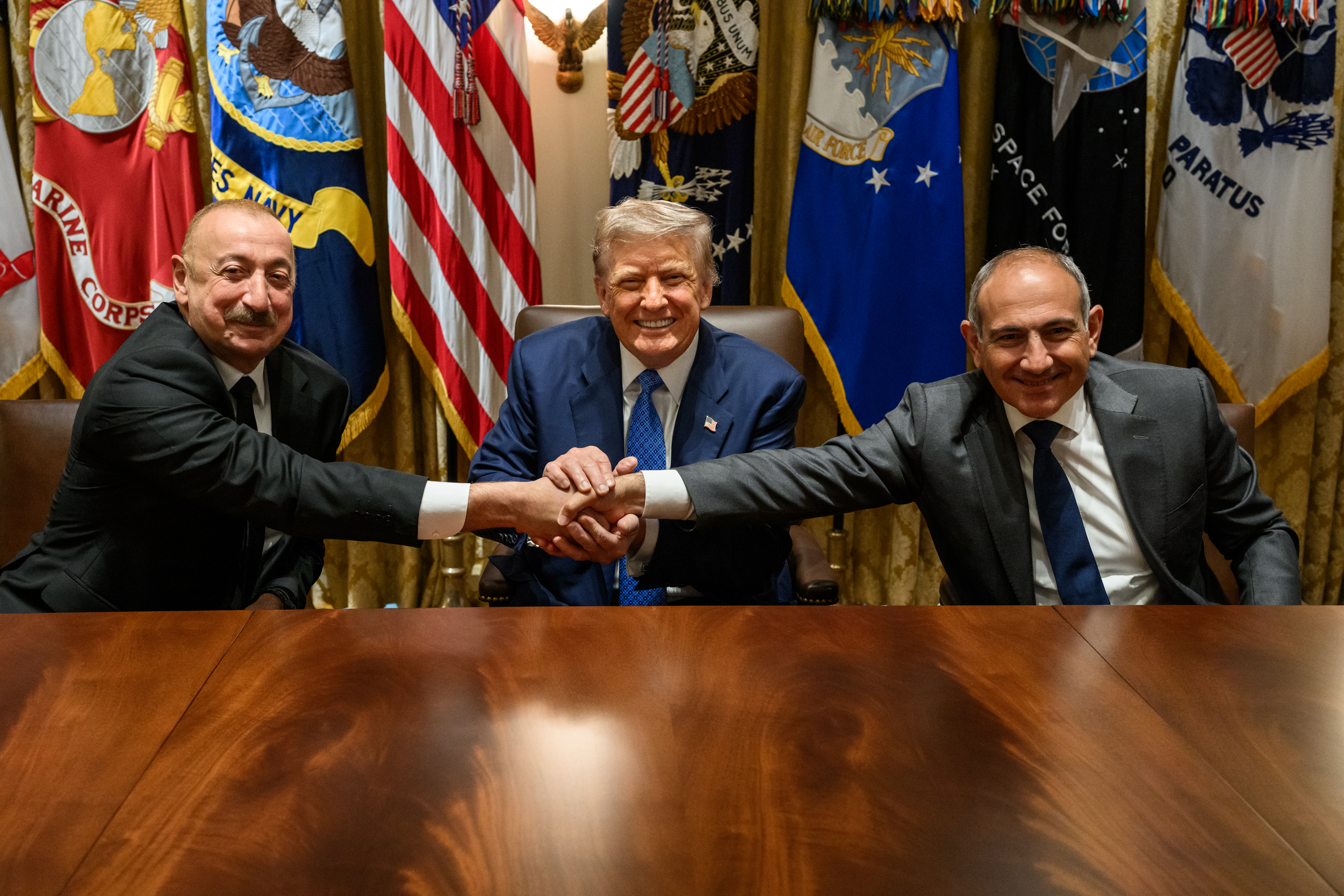
Aliyev with Donald Trump and Nikol Pashinyan in Washington in August 2025.

Date	Country	Location	Details
February 2024	Germany	Munich	Attended the Munich Security Conference.
February 2024	Turkey	Ankara	State visit.
April 2024	Russia	Moscow	Working visit.
April 2024	Germany	Berlin	Working visit.
June 2024	Egypt	Cairo	Official visit.
June 2024	Turkey	Ankara	Working visit.
July 2024	Kazakhstan	Astana	Attended the "SCO Plus" meeting.
July 2024	Pakistan	Islamabad	State visit.
July 2024	UK	Woodstock	Attended the 4th European Political Community Summit
August 2024	Kazakhstan	Astana	Attended the meeting of the Heads of State of Central Asia and Azerbaijan
August 2024	Uzbekistan	Tashkent	State visit
September 2024	Italy	Rome	Working visit
October 2024	Russia	Moscow	Attended the meeting of the CIS Heads of State Council
October 2024	Russia	Kazan	Attended the 16th BRICS Summit in the BRICS Plus
November 2024	Kyrgyzstan	Bishkek	Attended the 11th Summit of the Heads of State of the Organization of Turkic States
January 2025	UAE	Abu Dhabi	Working visit
January 2025	Switzerland	Davos	Attended the World Economic Forum
March 2025	Turkey	Ankara	Attended the opening ceremony of Iğdır-Nakhchivan gas pipeline.
April 2025	Turkey	Antalya	Attended the 4th Antalya Diplomacy Forum.
April 2025	China	Beijing	State visit.
May 2025	Albania	Tirana	Attended the 6th European Political Community Summit
May 2025	Hungary	Budapest	Attended the Informal Summit of Heads of State of Organization of Turkic States.
June 2025	Turkey	Kahramanmaraş	Working visit.
July 2025	UAE	Abu Dhabi	Meeting with the President of the United Arab Emirates Mohamed bin Zayed Al Nahyan and the Prime Minister of Armenia Nikol Pashinyan.
August 2025	USA	Washington	Meeting with the President of the United States of America Donald Trump and the Prime Minister of Armenia Nikol Pashinyan.
August 2025	Turkmenistan	Türkmenbaşy	Working visit.
September 2025	China	Tianjin, Beijing	Attendance to the 2025 Tianjin SCO summit and the 2025 China Victory Day Parade.
September 2025	USA	New York City	Attendance to the General debate of the eightieth session of the United Nations General Assembly.
October 2025	Denmark	Copenhagen	Attendance to the 7th European Political Community Summit.
October 2025	Tajikistan	Dushanbe	Attendance to the Commonwealth of Independent States Heads of State Council meeting.
October 2025	Egypt	Sharm El Sheikh	Attendance to the Gaza Peace Summit.
October 2025	Kazakhstan	Astana	State visit.
November 2025	Uzbekistan	Tashkent	Attended the 7th Consultative Meeting of the Heads of State of Central Asia.
December 2025	Slovakia	Bratislava	Official visit.
December 2025	UAE	Abu Dhabi	Official visit.
January 2026	Switzerland	Davos	Attended the World Economic Forum
February 2026	UAE	Abu Dhabi	Working visit.
February 2026	Germany	Munich	Attended the Munich Security Conference.
February 2026	Serbia	Belgrade	Official visit.
February 2026	USA	Washington	Working visit.
April 2026	Georgia	Tbilisi	State visit.
April 2026	Turkey	Antalya	Working visit.
May 2026	Kazakhstan	Turkistan	Working visit.
July 2026	Germany	Berlin	Official visit.
July 2026	Kyrgyzstan	Cholpon-Ata	State visit.
August 2026	Uzbekistan	Tashkent	State visit. Third meeting of Supreme Interstate Council of Azerbaijan and Uzbekistan.
August 2026	Kyrgyzstan	Bishkek	Attended the SCO summit and the opening ceremony of the 6th World Nomad Games.
October 2026	Turkmenistan	Avaza National Tourist Zone	Attended the CIS summit.
November 2026	Turkey	Antalya	Attended the 2026 United Nations Climate Change Conference.
November 2026	Ireland	Dublin	Attended the 9th European Political Community Summit.
November 2026	Vietnam	Hanoi	Official visit.

== Future trips ==
Country	Location	Date	Details
United States	Miami	14–15 December	Aliyev is scheduled to attend the G20 summit.
Russia	Saint Petersburg	21 December	Aliyev is with Prime Minister of Armenia Nikol Pashinyan plan attend the informal CIS summit.

== See also ==
- President of Azerbaijan
- Ilham Aliyev
