= GaindéSat‑1A =

- Country/ies of origin: Senegal
- Type: Nanosatellite
- Status: Active

Constellation size
- First launch: 16 August 2024

Orbital characteristics
- Orbital height: Low orbit

GaindéSat‑1A is Senegal's first satellite. It is a nanosatellite launched on 16 August 2024. It is the first on‑orbit milestone of Senegal's broader SenSAT/SENSAT national program aimed at using space data for practical development needs and it was led by Maram Kairé. This made Senegal the 12th nation in Africa to launch a satellite into space.

== Background ==
The GaindéSat‑1A is the first satellite that was launched by the Senegal Space Study Agency, collecting data for state agencies like the Directorate of Water Resources Management and Planning as well as the National Agency for Civil Aviation and Meteorology.

The satellite itself was designed and constructed in cooperation between Senegalese engineers and the Space Center of the French University of Montpellier (CSUM) for three years and it was launched on 16 August 2024 at 18:56 GMT from Vandenberg Space Force Base in California on SpaceX Falcon 9 rideshare mission. The rideshare mission also included 155 other small satellites.

Its successor, the GAINDESAT‐1B, is also planned to be launched.
