= List of ambassadors of Djibouti to the United States =

Coordinates: 38.905339°N 77.034874°W

Ambassador of Djibouti to the United States
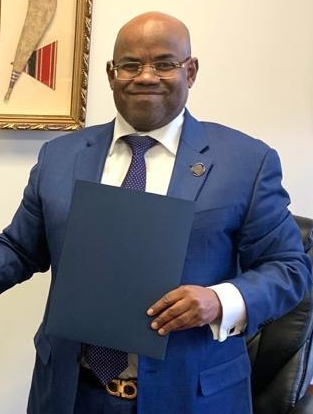
- Incumbent; Mohamed Siad Doualeh since January 28, 2016
- Inaugural holder: Saleh Farah Dirir
- Formation: June 4, 1981

The Djiboutian ambassador in Washington, D. C. is the official representative of the Government in Djibouti City to the Government of the United States.

== List of representatives ==
Diplomatic agrément	Diplomatic accreditation	Ambassador	Observations	List of presidents of Djibouti	List of presidents of the United States	Term end
June 27, 1977			Independence	Hassan Gouled Aptidon	Jimmy Carter	
April 1, 1981	June 4, 1981	Saleh Farah Dirir		Hassan Gouled Aptidon	Ronald Reagan	
January 25, 1988	March 22, 1988	Roble Olhaye	Roble Olhaye Oudine	Hassan Gouled Aptidon	Ronald Reagan	
December 3, 2015	January 28, 2016	Mohamed Siad Doualeh	born on December 27, 1968, and is married with 4 children.	Ismaïl Omar Guelleh	Barack Obama	

- Djibouti–United States relations
