= Maram Kairé =

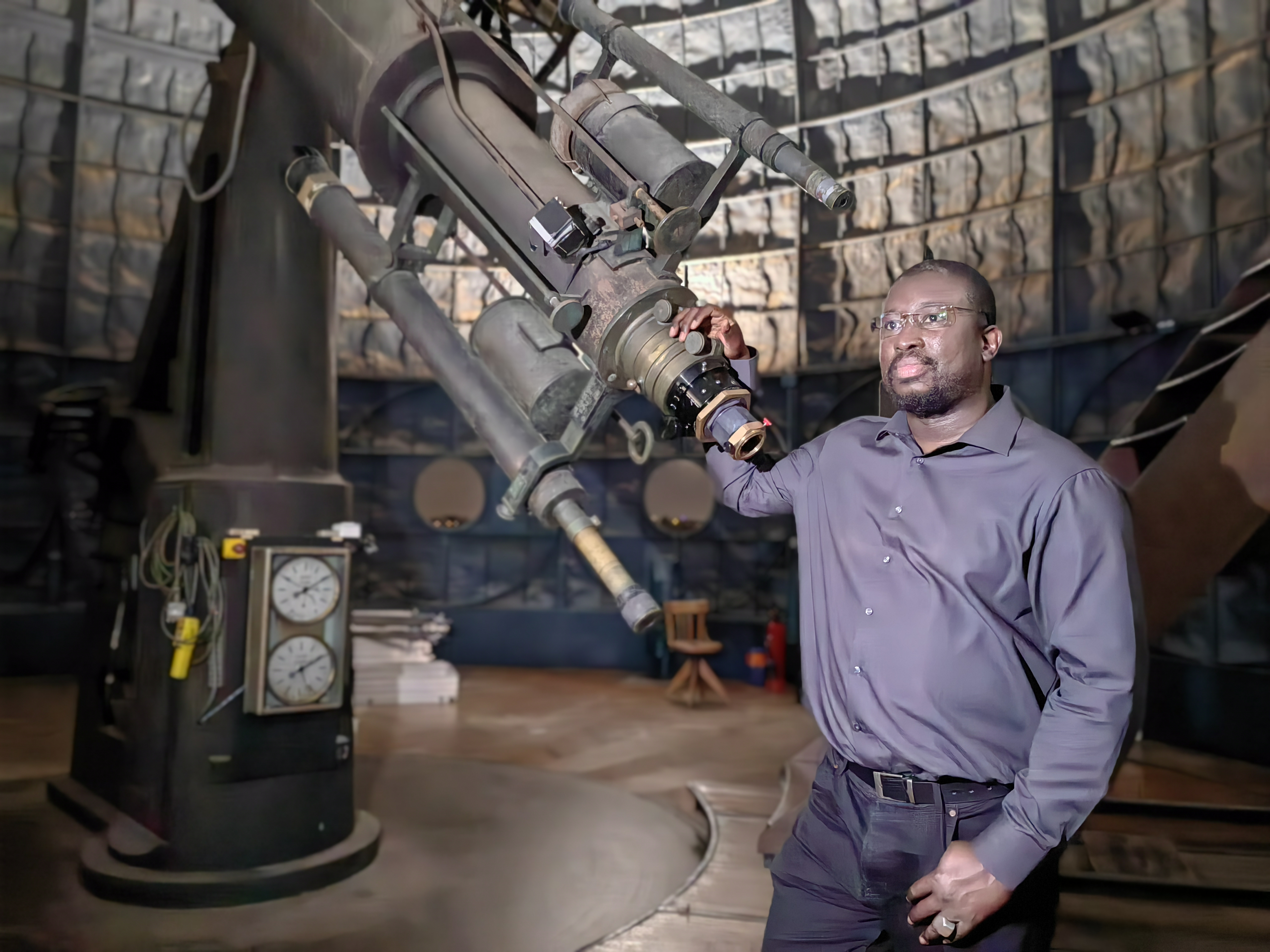
- Born: 1978; Dakar
- Academic career

Maram Kairé (born 1978 in Dakar, Senegal) is a Senegalese engineer and astronomer, who is the director-general of the Senegalese Space Study Agency. He was also the star of the documentary "Nova: Star Chasers of Senegal".

== Early life ==
Since Maram was 12, he was fascinated by astronomy. He enjoy reading books about it and even built a telescope at the age of 14. His parents did not want him to study space, so he chose to do computer science instead. He moved to France to study Systems and Network Engineering and then moved back to Senegal.

== Career ==
Maram has led three NASA missions that observed three asteroids. He is also co-founder and current president of the Senegalese Association for the Promotion of Astronomy. In March 2020, Maram was appointed National Astronomy Education Coordinator (NAEC) for Senegal by the International Astronomical Union (IAU). He is also managing director of AFRICASPACE. He has also led the development and launch of Senegal's first satellite, GaindéSat‑1A.

== Awards and recognition ==
Senegal - Commander of the National Order of the Lion

He is the 1st Senegalese person to have his name given to an asteroid in the Solar System, asteroid (35462) Maramkaire by the International Astronomical Union.

In 2022, he won the Cauris d'Or award.

In 2023, he was the first African to receive the Marcel MOYE Prize of the Astronomical Society France.
