= Graham Turnock =

British physicist

Dr. Graham Turnock

Chief Executive Officer of the UK Space Agency
- In office March 2017 – September 2021
- Monarch: Queen Elizabeth II
- Prime Minister: Boris Johnson

Personal details
- Education: University of Cambridge

Graham Turnock is a British physicist who served as the chief executive officer of the UK Space Agency from March 2017 to September 2021.

== Career ==
Turnock holds a PhD in Particle Physics from Cambridge University for his work at European Organization for Nuclear Research. For 15 years, he worked in HM Treasury, notably as leader of the Transport Spending Team. Before joining the UK Space Agency as chief executive officer, Turnock served as Director of Better Regulation in the Department for Business, Energy and Industrial Strategy.

Turnock served as the chief executive officer of the UK Space Agency from March 2017 to September 2021. During this time, he attempted to gain closer relationships with the Australian Space Agency via Sabre, a synergetic air-breathing rocket engine under development by British company Reaction Engines.

During Brexit negotiations, he warned that if the United Kingdom was expelled from the Galileo program, it would set it back by years and cost the European Union billions.

== Personal life ==
Turnock serves as a trustee of the Youth Hostels Association.
