= General debate of the eightieth session of the United Nations General Assembly =

September 2025 session

- 23 – 29 September 2025 80th session 80th general debate

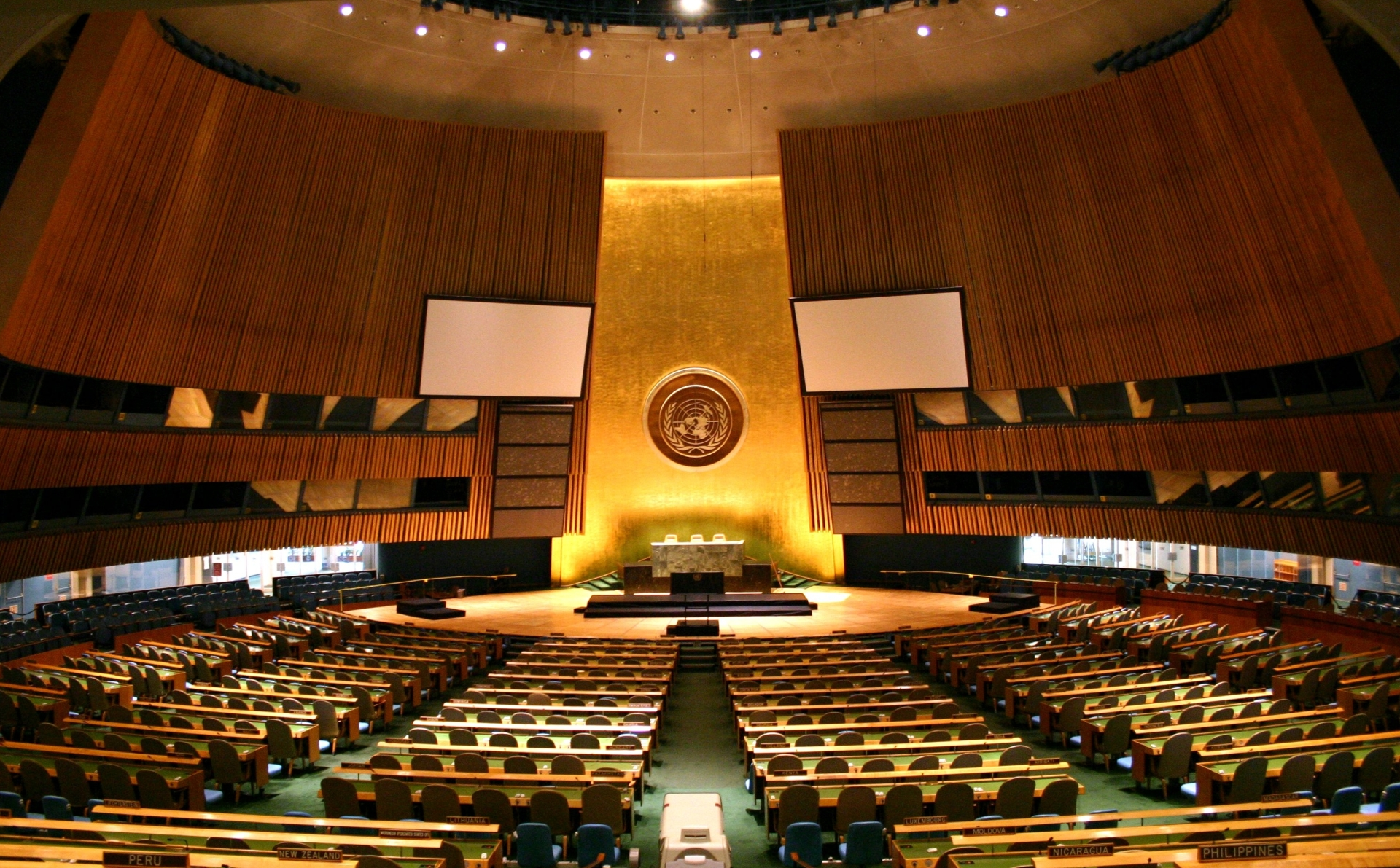
- General Assembly Hall at United Nations Headquarters, New York City
- Host country: United Nations
- Cities: New York City, United States
- Venues: General Assembly Hall at the United Nations Headquarters
- Participants: United Nations Member States
- President: Annalena Baerbock

The general debate of the eightieth session of the United Nations General Assembly (UNGA) opened on 23 September 2025 and ran until 29 September. Leaders from a number of member states addressed the UNGA. The Gaza war was a central point of contention during the debate, with anti-war protests occurring outside the assembly while many delegates boycotted a speech delivered by Israeli Prime Minister Benjamin Netanyahu.

== Organisation and subjects ==
The order of speakers is given first to member states, then observer states and supranational bodies. Any other observer entities will have a chance to speak at the end of the debate, if they so choose. Speakers will be put on the list in the order of their request, with special consideration for ministers and other government officials of similar or higher rank. According to the rules in place for the general debate, the statements should be in one of the United Nations official languages (Arabic, Chinese, English, French, Russian or Spanish) and will be interpreted by interpreters. Each speaker is requested to provide advance copies of their statements to the conference officers to facilitate interpretation. The theme for the 2025 general debate was chosen by the President of the General Assembly, Annalena Baerbock, as: "Better together: 80 years and more for peace, development and human rights". On 24 September, Syrian President Ahmed al-Sharaa addressed the general debate of the 80th session of the United Nations General Assembly, becoming the first Syrian leader to address the UNGA since Nureddin al-Atassi in 1967. (Note: Nureddin al-Atassi spoke after the Six-Day War, not during the general debate. Neither Hafez al-Assad nor Bashar al-Assad spoke at the UNGA during their presidencies.)

== Notable speeches ==
=== Colombia ===
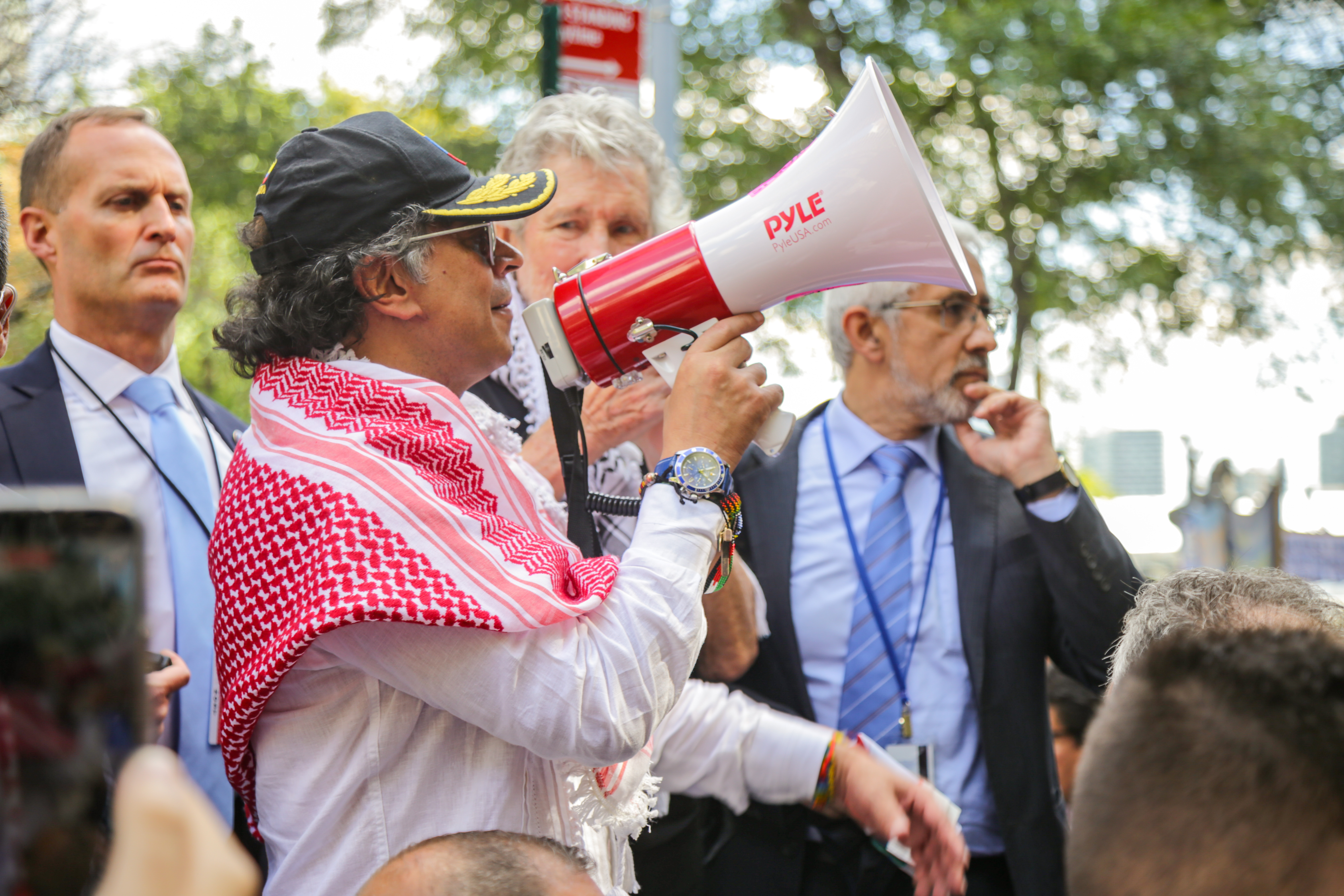
Petro alongside Roger Waters

Colombian President Gustavo Petro made a speech advocating for climate action, criticizing the Trump administration, and calling for military intervention in the Gaza genocide. He advocated forming "an armed force to defend the lives of the Palestinian people" and accused the United States and NATO of "killing democracy and reviving tyranny and totalitarianism on a global scale."

Following his speech, Petro participated in a protest where he spoke on militarism in the United States, saying, "I ask all soldiers in the US not to point their rifles at humanity. Disobey Trump's order! Obey the order of humanity!" The United States revoked his visa shortly after.

=== Israel ===
Israeli Prime Minister Benjamin Netanyahu made a speech that received significant media attention and was met with significant backlash.

On 26 September, the day of the speech, protesters assembled in various locations throughout New York City, including the UN headquarters, Times Square, and outside the News Corp. Building, to protest the Gaza genocide at Netanyahu's address. Large crowds marching to the UN chanted "Free, free Palestine," and some signs read "End all U.S. aid to Israel!", "Stop Starving Gaza", and "Stop the Genocide, Free Palestine". Pro-Israel counter-protesters, including Rabbi Shmuley Boteach, confronted the protesters.

When it was time for Netanyahu's address, the majority of UNGA delegates walked out in protest of Israel's actions during the Gaza war and genocide—"a sign of Israel's growing international isolation." The General Assembly chamber was "relatively empty" during his speech.

The 77 country delegates that walked out during Netanyahu's speech include:

- Afghanistan
- Algeria
- Angola
- Antigua and Barbuda
- Bahamas
- Bangladesh
- Barbados
- Belize
- Bolivia
- Bosnia and Herzegovina
- Botswana
- Brazil
- Brunei
- Central African Republic
- Chad
- Chile
- Colombia
- Comoros
- Congo
- Cuba
- Djibouti
- Dominica
- DRC
- Egypt
- Equatorial Guinea
- Eritrea
- Eswatini
- Guyana
- Indonesia
- Iran
- Iraq
- Ireland
- Jordan
- Kenya
- Kuwait
- Kyrgyzstan
- Lebanon
- Lesotho
- Liberia
- Libya
- Madagascar
- Malaysia
- Maldives
- Mauritania
- Mozambique
- Myanmar
- Namibia
- Nicaragua
- Niger
- North Korea
- North Macedonia
- Oman
- Palestine
- Pakistan
- Panama
- Peru
- Qatar
- Saint Lucia
- San Marino
- Saudi Arabia
- Senegal
- Slovenia
- Somalia
- South Africa
- Spain
- Sudan
- Suriname
- Syria
- Tonga
- Tunisia
- Turkey
- Turkmenistan
- Tuvalu
- Uganda
- Uzbekistan
- Venezuela
- Yemen

Netanyahu's speech primarily focused on promoting Israeli nationalism, discrediting allegations of human rights abuses, alleging widespread global antisemitism, and characterizing Israel as a victim of attacks by various forces in the Middle East. He made a joke in his speech about the UN being "not exactly a supporter of Israel" which was met with silence, after which he said, "you're supposed to laugh, by the way." Netanyahu said those who accuse Israel of genocide in Gaza are antisemitic and claimed a genocide is not happening in Gaza.

Netanyahu claimed Israeli intelligence had "hacked the smartphones of people in Gaza and would stream his speech to them directly." According to BBC sources in Gaza, phones were not actually affected. Netanyahu "surrounded Gaza with massive loudspeakers" to broadcast his speech according to CNN, telling Hamas to release the remaining hostages "or face death". Families of the hostages publicly opposed the use of loudspeakers to broadcast Nethanythu's speech.

=== United States ===
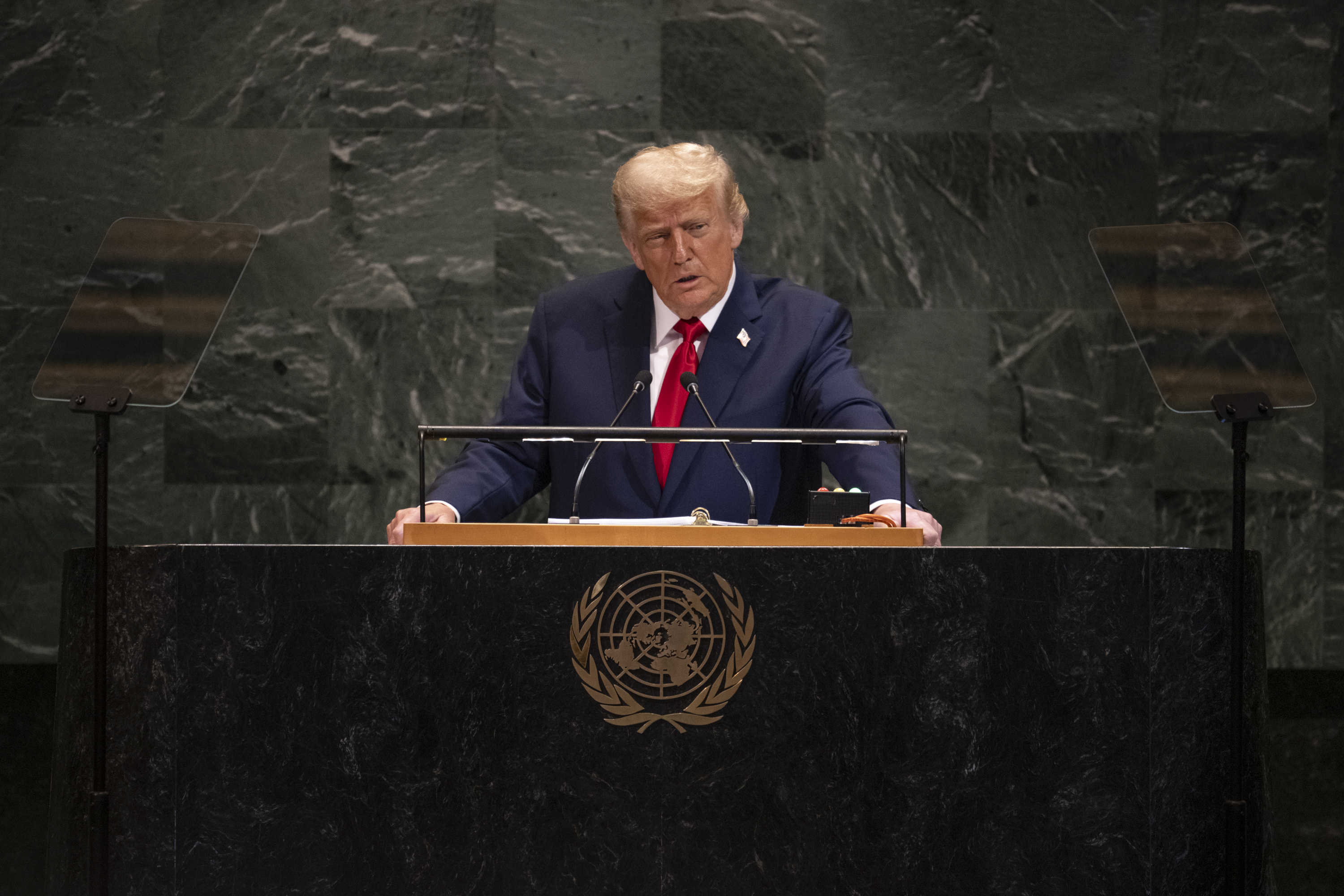
Donald Trump giving his speech

US President Donald Trump urged for an immediate cessation of hostilities in Gaza during the United Nations General Assembly. However, he expressed his belief that the acknowledgment of a Palestinian state by various Western nations was a reward for Hamas. He advocated that the release of Israeli captives was important in order to end the conflict.

Following Trump's address, the leaders of two prominent Muslim nations, Indonesian President Prabowo Subianto and Turkish President Recep Tayyip Erdogan, spoke at the General Assembly. Subianto remarked, "No nation can subjugate the entire human race," adding, "While we may appear weak as individuals, our collective sense of injustice will empower us as a formidable force to confront it." Erdogan stated that there were individuals complicit with Israeli Prime Minister Benjamin Netanyahu who remained silent in the face of his acts of brutality.

== Speaking schedule ==
Since 1955, Brazil and the United States have been the first and second countries to speak. Other countries follow according to a speaking schedule issued by the Secretariat.

The list of speakers is published and updated daily in the Journal of the United Nations, and on the general debate website.

=== 23 September ===
==== Morning session ====
- United Nations – António Guterres, Secretary-General (Report of the Secretary-General)
- United Nations – Annalena Baerbock, President of the General Assembly (Opening statement)
- Brazil – President Luiz Inácio Lula da Silva
- United States – President Donald Trump
- Indonesia – President Prabowo Subianto
- Turkey – President Recep Tayyip Erdoğan
- Peru – President Dina Boluarte
- Jordan – King Abdullah II
- South Korea – President Lee Jae Myung
- Qatar – Emir Tamim bin Hamad Al Thani
- Suriname – President Jennifer Geerlings-Simons
- Lithuania – President Gitanas Nausėda
- Portugal – President Marcelo Rebelo de Sousa
- Uruguay – President Yamandú Orsi
- Slovenia – President Nataša Pirc Musar
- Kazakhstan – President Kassym-Jomart Tokayev
- South Africa – President Cyril Ramaphosa
- Uzbekistan – President Shavkat Mirziyoyev

==== Afternoon session ====
- Mongolia – President Ukhnaagiin Khürelsükh
- Turkmenistan – President Serdar Berdimuhamedow
- Chile – President Gabriel Boric
- Tajikistan – President Emomali Rahmon
- Lebanon – President Joseph Aoun
- France – President Emmanuel Macron
- Kyrgyzstan – President Sadyr Japarov
- Colombia – President Gustavo Petro
- Poland – President Karol Nawrocki
- Mozambique – President Daniel Chapo
- Vietnam – President Lương Cường
- Angola – President João Lourenço
- Liberia – President Joseph Boakai
- Democratic Republic of the Congo – President Félix Tshisekedi
- Iraq – President Abdul Latif Rashid
- Nauru – President David Adeang
- Japan – Prime Minister Shigeru Ishiba
- Morocco – Prime Minister Aziz Akhannouch

=== 24 September ===
==== Morning session ====
- Spain – King Felipe VI
- Ukraine – President Volodymyr Zelenskyy
- Monaco – Prince Albert II
- Iran – President Masoud Pezeshkian
- Panama – President José Raúl Mulino
- Czech Republic – President Petr Pavel
- Switzerland – President Karin Keller-Sutter
- Latvia – President Edgars Rinkēvičs
- Kenya – President William Ruto
- Paraguay – President Santiago Peña
- Estonia – President Alar Karis
- Argentina – President Javier Milei
- Serbia – President Aleksandar Vučić
- Syria – President Ahmed al-Sharaa
- Croatia – President Zoran Milanović
- Cyprus – President Nikos Christodoulides
- Finland – President Alexander Stubb
- Sierra Leone – President Julius Maada Bio

==== Afternoon session ====
- Dominican Republic – President Luis Abinader
- Sri Lanka – President Anura Kumara Dissanayake
- Guatemala – President Bernardo Arévalo
- Comoros – President Azali Assoumani
- Namibia – President Netumbo Nandi-Ndaitwah
- Guyana – President Irfaan Ali
- Kiribati – President Taneti Maamau
- Senegal – President Bassirou Diomaye Faye
- Slovakia – President Peter Pellegrini
- Marshall Islands – President Hilda Heine
- Central African Republic – President Faustin-Archange Touadéra
- Albania – President Bajram Begaj
- Congo – President Denis Sassou Nguesso
- Madagascar – President Andry Rajoelina
- Nigeria – Vice President Kashim Shettima
- Kuwait – Crown Prince Sabah Al-Khalid Al-Sabah
- Australia – Prime Minister Anthony Albanese
- Italy – Prime Minister Giorgia Meloni
- Hungary – Minister for Foreign Affairs and Trade Péter Szijjártó
- Costa Rica – Minister for Foreign Affairs and Worship Arnoldo André Tinoco

=== 25 September ===
==== Morning session ====
- Somalia – President Hassan Sheikh Mohamud
- Montenegro – President Jakov Milatović
- Palestine – President Mahmoud Abbas (via videoconference)
- Yemen – Chairman of the Presidential Leadership Council Rashad al-Alimi
- North Macedonia – President Gordana Siljanovska-Davkova
- Haiti – Chairman of the Transitional Presidential Council Laurent Saint-Cyr
- Georgia – President Mikheil Kavelashvili
- Bolivia – President Luis Arce
- Gabon – President Brice Oligui Nguema
- Ghana – President John Mahama
- Guinea-Bissau – President Umaro Sissoco Embaló
- Eswatini – King Mswati III
- Palau – President Surangel Whipps Jr.
- Azerbaijan – President Ilham Aliyev
- Bosnia and Herzegovina – Chairman of the Presidency Željko Komšić
- Equatorial Guinea – Vice President Teodoro Nguema Obiang Mangue
- South Sudan – Vice President Josephine Joseph Lagu
- Gambia – Vice-President Muhammad B. S. Jallow
- Liechtenstein – Deputy Prime Minister Sabine Monauni

==== Afternoon session ====
- Libya – Chairman of the Presidential Council Mohamed al-Menfi
- Botswana – President Duma Boko
- Dominica – President Sylvanie Burton
- Federated States of Micronesia – President Wesley Simina
- Ethiopia – President Taye Atske Selassie
- European Union – President of the European Council António Costa
- Tanzania – Vice-President Philip Mpango
- Uganda – Vice-President Jessica Alupo
- Netherlands – Prime Minister Dick Schoof
- Belgium – Prime Minister Bart De Wever
- Chad – Prime Minister Allamaye Halina
- Sudan – Transitional Prime Minister Kamil Idris
- São Tomé and Príncipe – Prime Minister Américo Ramos
- United Kingdom – Deputy Prime Minister David Lammy
- Austria – Minister for European and International Affairs Beate Meinl-Reisinger
- Mexico – Minister for Foreign Affairs Juan Ramón de la Fuente
- Rwanda – Minister for Foreign Affairs and International Cooperation Olivier Nduhungirehe
- Ecuador – Minister for Foreign Affairs and Human Mobility Gabriela Sommerfeld
- Sweden – Minister for Foreign Affairs Maria Malmer Stenergard
- Cameroon – Minister for Foreign Affairs Lejeune Mbella Mbella
- Norway – Minister for Foreign Affairs Espen Barth Eide

=== 26 September ===
==== Morning session ====
- Israel – Prime Minister Benjamin Netanyahu
- Pakistan – Prime Minister Shehbaz Sharif
- China – Premier Li Qiang
- Saint Vincent and the Grenadines – Prime Minister Ralph Gonsalves
- Luxembourg – Prime Minister Luc Frieden
- Ireland – Taoiseach Micheál Martin
- Bangladesh – Chief Adviser Muhammad Yunus
- Malta – Prime Minister Robert Abela
- Greece – Prime Minister Kyriakos Mitsotakis
- Bhutan – Prime Minister Tshering Tobgay
- Barbados – Prime Minister Mia Mottley
- Solomon Islands – Prime Minister Jeremiah Manele
- Papua New Guinea – Prime Minister James Marape
- Jamaica – Prime Minister Andrew Holness
- Belize - Prime Minister John Briceño

==== Afternoon session ====
- Lesotho – Prime Minister Sam Matekane
- Cape Verde – Prime Minister Ulisses Correia e Silva
- Bulgaria – Prime Minister Rosen Zhelyazkov
- Mali – Prime Minister Abdoulaye Maïga
- Andorra – Head of Government Xavier Espot Zamora
- Trinidad and Tobago – Prime Minister Kamla Persad-Bissessar
- Antigua and Barbuda – Prime Minister Gaston Browne
- Fiji – Prime Minister Sitiveni Rabuka
- Tuvalu – Prime Minister Feleti Teo
- Tonga – Prime Minister ʻAisake Eke
- Samoa – Deputy Prime Minister Toelupe Poumulinuku Onesemo
- Zimbabwe – Minister of Foreign Affairs and International Trade Amon Murwira
- New Zealand – Minister for Foreign Affairs Winston Peters
- Ivory Coast – Minister for Foreign Affairs Kacou Adom
- Bahrain – Minister for Foreign Affairs Abdullatif bin Rashid Al Zayani
- Venezuela – Minister for Foreign Affairs Yván Gil
- Mauritius – Minister of Foreign Affairs, Regional Integration and International Trade Ritish Ramful
- Togo – Minister of Foreign Affairs, Cooperation and African Integration Robert Dussey

=== 27 September ===
==== Morning session ====
- Bahamas – Prime Minister Philip Davis
- Grenada – Prime Minister Dickon Mitchell
- Burkina Faso – Prime Minister Jean Emmanuel Ouédraogo
- Saint Kitts and Nevis – Prime Minister Terrance Drew
- Niger – Prime Minister Ali Lamine Zeine
- Laos – Prime Minister Sonexay Siphandone
- Armenia – Prime Minister Nikol Pashinyan
- Cambodia – Deputy Prime Minister Prak Sokhonn
- Russia – Minister for Foreign Affairs Sergey Lavrov
- Cuba – Minister for Foreign Affairs Bruno Rodríguez Parrilla
- Brunei – Minister for Foreign Affairs II Erywan Yusof
- Germany – Minister for Foreign Affairs Johann Wadephul
- Iceland – Minister for Foreign Affairs Þorgerður Katrín Gunnarsdóttir
- India – Minister for External Affairs S. Jaishankar
- Egypt – Minister for Foreign Affairs Badr Abdelatty
- Belarus – Minister for Foreign Affairs Maxim Ryzhenkov
- Mauritania – Minister for External Affairs Mohamed Salem Ould Merzoug
- Romania – Minister for Foreign Affairs Oana Țoiu
- Thailand – Minister for Foreign Affairs Sihasak Phuangketkeow

==== Afternoon session ====
- San Marino – Secretary for Foreign and Political Affairs Luca Beccari
- Saudi Arabia – Minister for Foreign Affairs Faisal bin Farhan Al Saud
- Singapore – Minister for Foreign Affairs Vivian Balakrishnan
- Oman – Minister for Foreign Affairs Badr bin Hamad Al Busaidi
- Malaysia – Minister for Foreign Affairs Mohamad Hasan
- Maldives – Minister for Foreign Affairs Abdulla Khaleel
- Tunisia – Minister for Foreign Affairs Mohammad Ali Nafti
- Guinea – Minister-Secretary General of the Presidency Amara Camara
- Philippines – Secretary for Foreign Affairs Tess Lazaro
- United Arab Emirates – Minister of State Lana Nusseibeh

=== 29 September ===
- Eritrea – Minister for Foreign Affairs Osman Saleh
- Saint Lucia – Minister for External Affairs Alva Baptiste
- Zambia – Minister for Foreign Affairs Mulambo Hamakuni Haimbe
- Canada – Minister for Foreign Affairs Anita Anand
- Burundi – Minister for Foreign Affairs Edouard Bizimana
- Algeria – Minister for Foreign Affairs Ahmed Attaf
- Honduras – Minister for Foreign Affairs Javier Efraín Bú
- Nicaragua – Minister for Foreign Affairs Denis Moncada
- Holy See – Secretary for Relations with States Paul Richard Gallagher
- North Korea – Vice Minister for Foreign Affairs Kim Son Gyong
- Moldova – Permanent Representative Gheorghe Leucă
- Malawi – Permanent Representative Agnes Mary Chimbiri-Molande
- Nepal – Permanent Representative Lok Bahadur Thapa
- Djibouti – Permanent Representative Mohamed Siad Doualeh
- Denmark – Permanent Representative Christina Markus Lassen
- Benin – Permanent Representative Marc Hermanne Araba
- Vanuatu – Permanent Representative Odo Tevi
- Timor-Leste – Permanent Representative Dionísio Babo Soares
- United Nations – Annalena Baerbock, President of the General Assembly (Closing statement)
- No representatives for Afghanistan, El Salvador, Myanmar, and Seychelles were on the agenda of the general debate.

== Sources ==
- Asi, Yara M. (19 August 2025). "The Growing Consensus over Israel's Genocide in Gaza". Arab Center Washington DC.
- Shaw, Martin (19 September 2025). "The Genocide that Changed the World". Journal of Genocide Research (Roundtable: Gaza and Genocide Studies): 1–15. doi:10.1080/14623528.2025.2556575. hdl:10230/71505.
- Sultany, Nimer (9 May 2024). "A Threshold Crossed: On Genocidal Intent and the Duty to Prevent Genocide in Palestine". Journal of Genocide Research (Forum: Gaza: International Humanitarian Law and Genocide): 1–26. doi:10.1080/14623528.2024.2351261.
- Tharoor, Ishaan (30 July 2025). "Leading genocide scholars see a genocide happening in Gaza". The Washington Post. Archived from the original on 11 August 2025.
- van den Berg, Stephanie (1 September 2025). "Israel is committing genocide in Gaza, scholars' association says". Reuters.
