= Agnes Mary Chimbiri-Molande =

Agnes Mary Chimbiri-Molande nee Kavinya Chimbiri (born 26 July 1960) is a Malawian social demographer who has served as the country's Permanent Representative to the United Nations since 2021.

== Early life and education ==
Agnes Kavinya was born in Malawi on 26 July 1960. She has said that she grew up doing household chores while her brothers did little. She was a cross country runner as a young person.

Chimbiri graduated with a Bachelor of Arts in education from the University of Malawi in 1984 and a Master of Arts in international affairs from the University of Ohio in the United States in 1986. In 2000, she received a PhD in social demography from the University of Waikato in New Zealand, with a thesis titled Women’s empowerment, spousal communication and reproductive decision-making in Malawi.

== Career ==
Chimbiri worked as a teacher until 1985, before entering civil service as personal assistant to the secretary to the president and Cabinet from 1986 to 1988. From 1989 to 1995, she was head of research and planning at the Ministry of Information and then worked from the World Bank as community and NGO liaison officer. She coordinated the National Family Welfare Council of Malawi. She was the director of the Centre for Reproductive Health of the College of Medicine, University of Malawi from 2003 to 2007.

Chimbiri was assistant representative for the Millennium Development Goals Achievement of UNDP in Malawi from 2008 to 2015. From 2015 to 2021, she was portfolio manager for governance for the UNDP in Malawi. She was appointed as Malawi's permanent representative to the United Nations by President Lazarus McCarthy Chakwera in June 2021. She is the first woman to hold the role. She has said her key priorities are climate financing, digital transformation, and financing for development.

In 2025, Chimbiri wrote the forward to Nthanda Manduwi's book Feminine Silence, saying "As an African diplomat, I have seen firsthand how gendered expectations play out in policy rooms, negotiations, and development agendas. Too often, women are invited to the table, but not fully heard. Too often, men are left out of the conversation about equity, when in fact they must be central to it."

== Selected publications ==
- Kavinya, Agnes; Alam, Sultana; Decock, Anamaria (1994). Applying DSC Methodologies to Population Issues: A Case Study in Malawi. Rome: FAO.
- Zulu, Eliya M.; Chimbiri, Agnes; Munthali, Alister C. (December 2004). "Adolescent Sexual and Reproductive Health in Malawi: A Synthesis of Research Evidence". Guttmacher Institute.
- Chimbiri, Agnes M. (2006). "Development, Family Change, and Community Empowerment in Malawi". In Baffour K. Takyi; Yaw Oheneba-Sakyi (eds.). African Families at the Turn of the 21st Century. Bloomsbury Publishing USA. pp. 227–247.
- Chimbiri, Agnes M (March 2007). "The condom is an 'intruder' in marriage: Evidence from rural Malawi". Social Science & Medicine. 64 (5): 1102–1115.
- Chilopora, Garvey; Pereira, Caetano; Kamwendo, Francis; Chimbiri, Agnes; Malunga, Eddie; Bergström, Staffan (14 June 2007). "Postoperative outcome of caesarean sections and other major emergency obstetric surgery by clinical officers and medical officers in Malawi". Human Resources for Health Article. 5 (17).
- Aarnio, P.; Olsson, P.; Chimbiri, A.; Kulmala, T (2009). "Male involvement in antenatal HIV counseling and testing: exploring men's perceptions in rural Malawi". AIDS Care. 21 (12): 1537–1546.
- Helleringer, Stephane; Kohler, Hans-Peter; Chimbiri, Agnes; Chatonda, Praise; Mkandawire, James (2009). "The Likoma Network Study: Context, data collection, and initial results". Demographic Research. 21: 427–468. doi:10.4054/DemRes.2009.21.15. PMC 2825888.

== Personal life ==
Chimbiri has three children. She married author Harry Molande in Lilongwe on 25 September 2021.
