= Ministry of Communications, Knowledge and Technology (Botswana) =

Government ministry of Botswana

The Ministry of Communications, Knowledge and Technology is a ministry within the Cabinet of Botswana. There are 6 departments of the ministry, the Radiation Protection Inspectorate, Shared Digital Services [sic], Technology and Commercialisation [sic], Research and Knowledge Business, Digital Communication, Infrastructure and Business, and the Digital Transformation Coordination Office.

== Ministers ==
- Thulagano Merafe Segokgo (6 November 2019-)
