= General debate of the seventy-ninth session of the United Nations General Assembly =

Information and list of speakers for the 2024 UNGA

- 24–30 September 2024 79th session 79th general debate

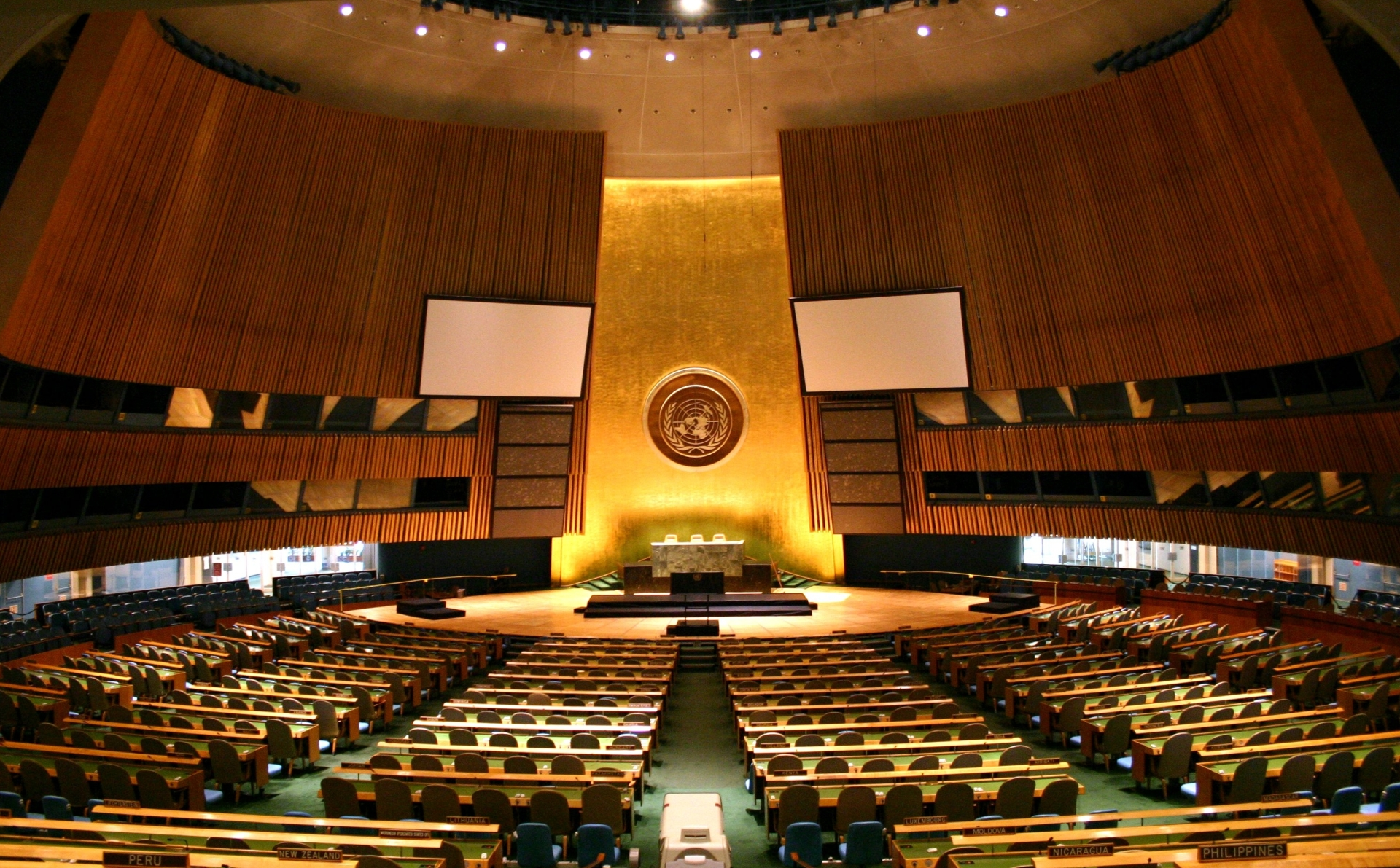
- General Assembly Hall at United Nations Headquarters, New York City
- Host country: United Nations
- Cities: New York City, United States
- Venues: General Assembly Hall at the United Nations Headquarters
- Participants: United Nations Member States
- President: Philemon Yang
- Secretary-General: António Guterres

The General debate of the seventy-ninth session of the United Nations General Assembly (UNGA) opened on 24 September 2024 and continued until 28 September, returning for a last day on 30 September 2024. Leaders, diplomats and representatives from member states addressed the UNGA.

== Organisation and subjects ==
The order of speakers is given first to member states, then observer states and supranational bodies. Any other observer entities will have a chance to speak at the end of the debate, if they so choose. Speakers will be put on the list in the order of their request, with special consideration for ministers and other government officials of similar or higher rank. According to the rules in place for the General Debate, the statements should be in one of the United Nations official languages (Arabic, Chinese, English, French, Russian or Spanish) and will be translated and interpreted by United Nations translators and interpreters. Each speaker is requested to provide 20 advance copies of their statements to the conference officers to facilitate translation and to be presented at the podium. The theme for this year's debate was chosen by President Philémon Yang as: "Leaving no one behind: acting together for the advancement of peace, sustainable development and human dignity for present and future generations".

== Speaking schedule ==
Since 1955 Brazil and the United States are traditionally the first and second countries to speak. Other countries follow according to a speaking schedule issued by the Secretariat.

The list of speakers is provided by both the daily UN Journal, while changes in order are also reflected by the UNGA General Debate website.

=== Tuesday, 24 September ===
==== Morning session ====
- United Nations – Secretary-General António Guterres (Report of the UN Secretary-General)
- United Nations – 79th Session of the United Nations General Assembly – President Philémon Yang (Opening statement)
- Brazil – President Luiz Inácio Lula da Silva
- United States – President Joe Biden
- Turkey – President Recep Tayyip Erdoğan
- Jordan – King Abdullah II
- Guatemala – President Bernardo Arévalo
- Switzerland – President Viola Amherd
- Colombia – President Gustavo Petro
- Qatar – Emir Tamim bin Hamad Al Thani
- South Africa – President Cyril Ramaphosa
- Maldives – President Mohamed Muizzu
- Tajikistan – President Emomali Rahmon
- Lithuania – President Gitanas Nausėda
- Sierra Leone – President Julius Maada Bio
- Serbia – President Aleksandar Vučić
- Angola – President João Lourenço

==== Afternoon session ====
- Mauritania – President Mohamed Ould Ghazouani
- Kyrgyzstan – President Sadyr Jarapov
- Argentina – President Javier Milei
- El Salvador – President Nayib Bukele
- Iran – President Masoud Pezeshkian
- Estonia – President Alar Karis
- Chile – President Gabriel Boric
- Latvia – President Edgars Rinkēvičs
- Paraguay – President Santiago Peña
- Vietnam – General Secretary and President Tô Lâm
- Poland – President Andrzej Duda
- Monaco – Prince Albert II
- Nauru – President David Adeang
- Nigeria – Vice President Kashim Shettima
- Bahrain – Crown Prince and Prime Minister Salman bin Hamad Al Khalifa
- Italy – Prime Minister Giorgia Meloni
- Morocco – Prime Minister Aziz Akhannouch
- Belgium – Prime Minister Alexander De Croo

=== Wednesday, 25 September ===
==== Morning session ====
- Mongolia – President Khurelsukh Ukhnaa
- Seychelles – President Wavel Ramkalawan
- Czech Republic – President Petr Pavel
- Ukraine – President Volodymyr Zelenskyy
- Ghana – President Nana Akufo-Addo
- Bulgaria – President Rumen Radev
- Suriname – President Chan Santokhi
- Cyprus – President Nikos Christodoulides
- Slovakia – President Peter Pellegrini
- Namibia – President Nangolo Mbumba
- Libya – President of the Presidential Council, Mohamed al-Menfi
- Dominican Republic – President Luis Abinader
- Romania – President Klaus Iohannis
- Democratic Republic of the Congo – President Félix Tshisekedi
- Guinea-Bissau – President Úmaro Sissoco Embaló
- Cape Verde – President José Maria Neves
- Honduras – President Xiomara Castro
- Liberia – President Joseph Boakai
- Botswana – President Mokgweetsi Masisi
- France – President Emmanuel Macron

==== Afternoon session ====
- Bosnia and Herzegovina – Chairman of the Presidency Denis Bećirović
- Finland – President Alexander Stubb
- Guyana – President Irfaan Ali
- Panama – President José Raúl Mulino
- Togo – President Faure Gnassingbé
- Senegal – President Bassirou Diomaye Faye
- Dominica – President Sylvanie Burton
- Marshall Islands – President Hilda Heine
- Georgia – Prime Minister Irakli Kobakhidze
- Spain – Prime Minister Pedro Sánchez
- Chad – Prime Minister Allamaye Halina
- Hungary – Minister of Foreign Affairs and Trade Péter Szijjártó
- Uzbekistan – Minister of Foreign Affairs Bakhtiyor Saidov
- Venezuela – Minister of the People's Power for Foreign Affairs Yván Gil
- Zimbabwe – Minister for Foreign Affairs and International Trade Frederick Shava
- South Sudan – Minister for Foreign Affairs and International Cooperation Ramadhan Abdalla Mohammed Goc
- Bolivia – Minister for Foreign Affairs Celinda Sosa Lunda

=== Thursday, 26 September ===
==== Morning session ====
- Malawi – President Lazarus Chakwera
- Kenya – President William Ruto
- Yemen – Chairman of the Presidential Leadership Council Rashad al-Alimi
- Gabon – President of the Transition Brice Oligui Nguema
- Central African Republic – Head of State Faustin-Archange Touadéra
- Palestine – President Mahmoud Abbas
- Gambia – President Adama Barrow
- Haiti – Chairman of the Transitional Presidential Council Edgard Leblanc Fils
- Sudan – President of the Transitional Sovereignty Council Abdel Fattah al-Burhan
- São Tomé and Príncipe – President Carlos Vila Nova
- Lesotho – King Letsie III
- North Macedonia – President Gordana Siljanovska-Davkova
- Uruguay – President Luis Lacalle Pou
- Fiji – President Wiliame Katonivere
- Equatorial Guinea – Vice President Teodoro Nguema Obiang Mangue
- Palau – Vice President Uduch Sengebau Senior
- Kuwait – Crown Prince Sabah Al-Khalid Al-Sabah
- Portugal – Prime Minister Luís Montenegro

==== Afternoon session ====
- Federated States of Micronesia – President Wesley Simina
- Mauritius – President Prithvirajsing Roopun
- European Union – President of the European Council Charles Michel
- Ivory Coast – Vice President Tiémoko Meyliet Koné
- Netherlands – Prime Minister Dick Schoof
- Armenia – Prime Minister Nikol Pashinyan
- Iraq – Prime Minister Mohammed Shia' Al Sudani
- Greece – Prime Minister Kyriakos Mitsotakis
- United Kingdom – Prime Minister Keir Starmer
- Nepal – Prime Minister K.P. Sharma Oli
- New Zealand – Deputy Prime Minister Winston Peters
- Comoros – Minister for Foreign Affairs and International Cooperation Mbae Mohamed
- Liechtenstein – Minister for Foreign Affairs Dominique Hasler
- Sweden – Minister for Foreign Affairs Maria Malmer Stenergard
- Austria – Federal Minister for European and International Affairs Alexander Schallenberg
- Costa Rica – Minister for Foreign Affairs and Worship Arnoldo André Tinoco
- Germany – Federal Minister for Foreign Affairs Annalena Baerbock
- Lebanon – Minister for Foreign Affairs and Emigrants Abdallah Bou Habib
- Peru – Minister for Foreign Affairs Elmer Schialer Salcedo

=== Friday, 27 September ===
==== Morning session ====
- Slovenia – Prime Minister Robert Golob
- Pakistan – Prime Minister Muhammad Shehbaz Sharif
- Israel – Prime Minister Benjamin Netanyahu
- Barbados – Prime Minister Mia Amor Mottley
- Bhutan – Prime Minister Tshering Tobgay
- Andorra – Head of the Government Xavier Espot Zamora
- Bangladesh – Chief Adviser Muhammad Yunus
- Moldova – Prime Minister Dorin Recean
- Vanuatu – Prime Minister Charlot Salwai Tabimasmas
- Croatia – Prime Minister Andrej Plenković
- Papua New Guinea – Prime Minister James Marape
- Malta – Prime Minister Robert Abela
- Bahamas – Prime Minister Philip Edward Davis
- Tanzania – Prime Minister Kassim Majaliwa Majaliwa
- Saint Vincent and the Grenadines – Prime Minister Ralph Gonsalves
- Eswatini – Prime Minister Russell Dlamini
- Uganda – Prime Minister Robinah Nabbanja

==== Afternoon session ====
- Antigua and Barbuda – Prime Minister Gaston Browne
- Albania – Prime Minister Edi Rama
- Samoa – Prime Minister Fiamē Naomi Mataʻafa
- Laos – Prime Minister Sonexay Siphandone
- Tuvalu – Prime Minister Feleti Teo
- Saint Kitts and Nevis – Prime Minister Terrance Drew
- East Timor – Prime Minister Kay Rala Xanana Gusmão
- Tonga – Prime Minister Siaosi Sovaleni
- Somalia – Prime Minister Hamza Abdi Barre
- Madagascar – Prime Minister Christian Ntsay
- Montenegro – Deputy Prime Minister for Foreign and European Affairs Filip Ivanović
- Turkmenistan – Deputy Chairman of the Cabinet of Ministers Raşit Meredow
- South Korea – Minister for Foreign Affairs Cho Tae-yul
- Australia – Minister for Foreign Affairs Penny Wong
- Saint Lucia – Minister for External Affairs Alva Baptiste
- Jamaica – Minister for Foreign Affairs and Foreign Trade Kamina Johnson Smith
- Tunisia – Minister for Foreign Affairs Mohamed Ali Nafti
- Solomon Islands – Minister for Foreign Affairs Peter Shanel Agovaka
- Cameroon – Minister for External Relations Lejeune Mbella Mbella
- Ethiopia – Minister for Foreign Affairs Taye Atskeselassie

=== Saturday, 28 September ===
==== Morning session ====
- Grenada – Prime Minister Dickon Mitchell
- Guinea – Prime Minister Bah Oury
- Holy See – Secretary Pietro Parolin
- China – Minister for Foreign Affairs Wang Yi
- Kazakhstan – Deputy Prime Minister Murat Nurtleu
- Cambodia – Deputy Prime Minister Sok Chenda Sophea
- Luxembourg – Deputy Prime Minister Xavier Bettel
- Mali – Deputy Prime Minister Abdoulaye Maiga
- Indonesia – Minister for Foreign Affairs Retno Lestari Priansari Marsudi
- Russia – Minister for Foreign Affairs Sergey Lavrov
- Mexico – Minister for Foreign Affairs Alicia Bárcena Ibarra
- Norway – Minister for Foreign Affairs Espen Barth Eide
- India – Minister for External Affairs Subrahmanyam Jaishankar
- Singapore – Minister for Foreign Affairs Vivian Balakrishnan
- Cuba – Minister for Foreign Affairs Bruno Eduardo Rodríguez Parrilla
- Philippines – Secretary for Foreign Affairs Enrique Manalo
- San Marino – Minister for Foreign Affairs Luca Beccari
- Malaysia – Minister for Foreign Affairs Mohamad Hasan
- Egypt – Minister for Foreign Affairs Badr Ahmed Mohamed Abdelatty

==== Afternoon session ====
- Saudi Arabia – Minister for Foreign Affairs Faisal bin Farhan Al-Saud
- Zambia – Minister for Foreign Affairs Mulambo Hamakuni Haimbe
- Belarus – Minister for Foreign Affairs Maxim Ryzhenkov
- Iceland – Minister for Foreign Affairs Þórdís Kolbrún R. Gylfadóttir
- Oman – Foreign Minister Badr bin Hamad Al Busaidi
- Denmark – Minister for Foreign Affairs Lars Løkke Rasmussen
- Thailand – Minister for Foreign Affairs Maris Sangiampongsa
- Azerbaijan – Minister for Foreign Affairs Jeyhun Bayramov
- Trinidad and Tobago – Minister for Foreign and CARICOM Affairs Amery Browne
- Belize – Minister for Foreign Affairs and Foreign Trade Francis Fonseca
- Benin – Minister for Foreign Affairs Olushegun Adjadi Bakari
- Japan – Permanent Representative Kazuyuki Yamazaki

=== Monday, 30 September ===
==== Morning session ====
- Syria – Minister for Foreign Affairs and Expatriates Bassam al-Sabbagh
- Nicaragua – Minister for Foreign Affairs Valdrack Jaentschke
- Eritrea – Minister for Foreign Affairs Osman Saleh
- Niger – Minister for Foreign Affairs Bakary Yaou Sangaré
- Burkina Faso – Minister for Foreign Affairs Karamoko Jean-Marie Traoré
- Republic of the Congo – Minister for Foreign Affairs Jean-Claude Gakosso
- Algeria – Minister for Foreign Affairs Ahmed Attaf
- Burundi – Minister for Foreign Affairs Albert Shingiro
- Canada – Minister for Foreign Affairs Mélanie Joly
- Ireland – Minister of State Seán Fleming
- Mozambique – Deputy Minister for Foreign Affairs Manuel José Gonçalves
- United Arab Emirates – Minister of State Sheikh Shakhboot Nahyan Al-Nahyan
- Sri Lanka – Permanent Representative Mohan Peiris
- North Korea – Permanent Representative Kim Song
- Kiribati – Permanent Representative Teburoro Tito
- Djibouti – Permanent Representative Mohamed Siad Doualeh
- Rwanda – Permanent Representative Ernest Rwamucyo
- Ecuador – Permanent Representative José Javier de la Gasca
- United Nations – 79th Session of the United Nations General Assembly – President Philémon Yang (Closing statement)
- No representatives for Afghanistan, Brunei and Myanmar were on the agenda of the general debate.

== See also ==
- List of UN General Assembly sessions
- List of General debates of the United Nations General Assembly
