= Mohamed Siad Doualeh =

Djiboutian politician (born 1968)

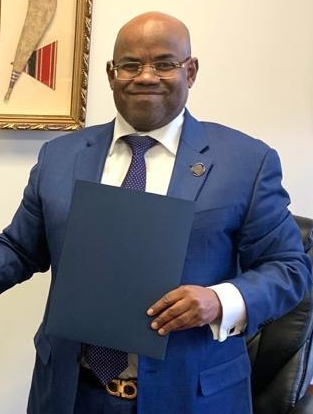
- Mohamed Siad Doualeh in 2020

Djiboutian Ambassador to the United States
- Incumbent
- Assumed office 28 January 2016

Personal details
- Born: 27 December 1968 (age 57)

Mohamed Siad Doualeh (born 27 December 1968) is a Djiboutian diplomat who has been Djiboutian Ambassador to the United States since 2016.
