= List of international presidential trips made by Edgars Rinkēvičs =

This is a List of international presidential trips made by Edgars Rinkēvičs, the 11th President of Latvia.

== Summary ==
Number of visits per country where President Rinkēvičs has traveled:

- One: Armenia, Brazil, Canada, Croatia, Israel, Japan, Malta, the Netherlands, Norway, Palestine, Switzerland, Turkey and the United Kingdom
- Two: Azerbaijan, France, Italy, Romania and Ukraine
- Three: Estonia, and Finland
- Four: the Lithuania, and United States
- Five: Germany and Poland

== 2023 ==
Country	Areas visited	Dates	Details	Image
Estonia	Tallinn	10 July	First official foreign visit; met with President Alar Karis, Prime Minister Kaja Kallas, and Speaker of the Riigikogu Lauri Hussar.	
Lithuania	Vilnius	19 July	Official visit to meet with President Gitanas Nausėda and Speaker of the Seimas Viktorija Čmilytė-Nielsen.	
Poland	Warsaw	16 August	Working visit; met with President Andrzej Duda to discuss regional security and the Three Seas Initiative.	
Romania	Bucharest	6–7 September	Attended Three Seas Initiative summit by Romanian President Klaus Iohannis, Estonian President Alar Karis, Lithuanian President Gitanas Nausėda, Polish President Andrzej Duda, Czech President Petr Pavel, Austrian President Alexander Van der Bellen, Hungarian President Katalin Novák, Slovenian President Nataša Pirc Musar, Bulgarian President Rumen Radev, Slovak President Zuzana Čaputová, Romanian Prime Minister Marcel Ciolacu and Croatian Prime Minister Andrej Plenković. Invited guests were Moldovan President Maia Sandu, Greek President Aikateríni Sakellaropoúlou, Ukrainian Deputy Prime Minister Yulia Svyrydenko and US Special Envoy for Climate Change John Kerry.	
United States	New York City, Boston	16–23 September	Attended the Seventy-eighth session of the United Nations General Assembly and the "Spotlight Latvia" business conference.	
Finland	Helsinki	28 September	Met with President Sauli Niinistö Prime Minister Petteri Orpo.	
Israel	Jerusalem, Tel Aviv	19–20 November	Solidarity visit following the 7 October Hamas-led attack on Israel; met with President Isaac Herzog and Palestinian Authority President Mahmoud Abbas.	
Palestine	Ramallah	19–20 November	Solidarity visit following the 7 October Hamas-led attack on Israel; met with President Isaac Herzog and Palestinian Authority President Mahmoud Abbas.	
Ukraine	Kyiv, Chernihiv Oblast	24 November	Unannounced visit to express support; met with President Volodymyr Zelenskyy and inspected reconstruction projects funded by Latvia.	
France	Paris	15 December	Working visit; met with President Emmanuel Macron to discuss European security and the EU budget.	

== 2024 ==
Country	Areas visited	Dates	Details	Image
Malta	Valletta	5–6 February	State visit; met with President George Vella.	
Germany	Munich	13–15 February	Attended the 60th Munich Security Conference.	
Lithuania	Vilnius	11 April	Attended Three Seas Initiative Summit, where he met with Presidents of Lithuania, Estonia, Poland, Czech Republic, Hungary, Romania, and Bulgaria, Greek Prime Minister Kyriakos Mitsotakis, Slovak Prime Minister Robert Fico, Croatian Foreign Minister Gordan Grlić-Radman, Austrian Federal Minister for Integration Susanne Raab, and Ukrainian President Volodymyr Zelenskyy to sign a 10-year bilateral security agreement.	
Greece	Athens, Delphi	11–12 April	Participated in the Delphi Economic Forum; met with President Katerina Sakellaropoulou.	
Italy	Rome	14–15 May	Official visit; met with President Sergio Mattarella.	
United Kingdom	London, Oxford	27–29 May	Working visit; held an audience with King Charles III at Buckingham Palace and meet with the Latvian diaspora residing in the United Kingdom. The visit's programme will also include the president's participation in discussions at the Royal United Services Institute (RUSI) and the University of Oxford and interviews with several media outlets.	
Switzerland	Nidwalden	15–16 June	Attended the Summit on Peace in Ukraine.	
Canada	Toronto	6–7 July	Rinkēvičs travelled to Toronto to attend the XVI Latvian Song and Dance Festival in Canada. President attended the Mass Choir Concert on July 6 and the Folk Dance Spectacle on July 7, as well as the Ecumenical Church service at St. John’s Church in Toronto.	
United States	Washington, D.C.	10–11 July	Attended the 75th Anniversary NATO Summit.	
France	Paris	25–28 July	Attended the opening ceremony of the 2024 Summer Olympics.	
United States	California, New York City	17–27 September	Met with tech companies in Silicon Valley (NASA, Meta, Google) and attended the 79th session of the UN General Assembly.	
Germany	Berlin	14–15 October	On the first day, Rinkēvičs paid a working visit to Berlin, where he met with Frank-Walter Steinmeier to discuss Latvian–German relations, European security, continued support for Ukraine, and current issues on the European Union agenda. He also met with Federal Minister for Digital and Transport Volker Wissing, opened the Latvia–Germany local government forum Latvia–Germany Synergy: a driving force for digital transformation, met with representatives of Siemens Energy, and gave interviews to Handelsblatt and Deutsche Welle On the second day of the visit, Rinkēvičs participated in the Smart Country Convention 2024, met with representatives of the German Defence Industry Association and Diehl Defence, and discussed digitalisation, defence industry cooperation, investment, and the implementation of the IRIS-T air defence system contract with Latvia.	
Azerbaijan	Baku	11–12 November	Attended COP29.	

== 2025 ==
Country	Areas visited	Dates	Details	Image
Finland	Helsinki	14 January	Rinkēvičs attended the Baltic Sea NATO Allies Summit in Helsinki. He also met with President of Finland Alexander Stubb, Prime Minister of Estonia Kristen Michal, NATO Secretary General Mark Rutte, and Vice-President of the European Commission Henna Virkkunen.	
Germany	Munich	14–15 February	Attended the 61st Munich Security Conference.	
Ukraine	Kyiv	24 February	Rinkēvičs travelled to Kyiv to mark the third anniversary of the Russian invasion of Ukraine.	
Poland	Warsaw	25–26 February	State visit; met with President Andrzej Duda and received the Order of the White Eagle.	
Norway	Oslo	27–28 March	Official visit; audience with Crown Prince Regent Haakon and met with Prime Minister Jonas Gahr Støre.	
Vatican City	Vatican City	26 April	Attended the funeral of Pope Francis at St. Peter's Square.	
Poland	Warsaw	28–29 April	participated in the tenth Three Seas Initiative leaders' meeting.	
Japan	Tokyo, Osaka	18–20 May	Rinkēvičs travelled to Tokyo to meet with Prime Minister Shigeru Ishiba. He attended Expo 2025 in Osaka, Kansai.	
Lithuania	Vilnius	2 June	Rinkēvičs met with the President of the Republic of Lithuania Gitanas Nausėda, the President of Estonia Alar Karis, the President of Poland Andrzej Duda, the President of the Republic of Czech Republic Petr Pavel, the President of Slovakia Peter Pellegrini, the President of Romania Nicușor Dan, the President of Ukraine Volodymyr Zelenskyy, the Prime Minister of Norway Jonas Gahr Støre, the Prime Minister of Denmark Mette Frederiksen, the Prime Minister of Finland Petteri Orpo, the Minister of Foreign Affairs of Sweden Maria Malmer Stenergarde, the Minister of Foreign Affairs of Iceland Þorgerður Katrín Gunnarsdóttir, the Minister of Defence of Bulgaria Atanas Zapryanov, the Minister of Defence of Hungary Kristóf Szalay-Bobrovniczky and NATO Secretary General Mark Rutte, when the discussion was in the context of preparations for the NATO summit.	
Finland	Kultaranta	16–17 June	Karis met with Finnish President Alexander Stubb and Estonian President Alar Karis at the 13th Kultaranta Talks event held at the Finnish President's summer residence in Kultaranta, located near the city of Turku, where the discussion focused on the security situation in Europe, transatlantic cooperation, and the Middle East, where the Estonian head of state participated in the discussions for the first time this year.	
Netherlands	The Hague	23–25 June	Rinkēvičs attended the 2025 NATO summit.	
Estonia	Tallinn	4 July	Met with Estonian President Alar Karis and Lithuanian President Gitanas Nausėda. They discussed Russia's aggression against Ukraine, developments in the Middle East, regional security matters, and infrastructure projects such as Rail Baltic and Via Baltica. They will also address transatlantic relations in light of the recent NATO summit in The Hague.	
Austria	Alpbach	25–27 August	Participated in the European Forum Alpbach.	
Poland	Warsaw	28 August	Met with Karol Nawrocki, the presidents of Estonia, Alar Karis, and Lithuania, Gitanas Nausėda and Danish Prime Minister Mette Frederiksen. These discussions with the leaders from the region are a preparatory step for Polish President’s upcoming visit to Washington, DC, next week. They also took part in a teleconference with Ukrainian President Volodymyr Zelenskyy.	
Finland	Helsinki	16 September	State visit; awarded the Grand Cross with Collar of the Order of the White Rose of Finland.	
United States	New York City	20–25 September	Attended the 80th session of the UN General Assembly.	
Denmark	Copenhagen	28–29 October	Official visit; met with King Frederik X and received the Order of the Elephant.	
Brazil	Belém, São Paulo	3–10 November	Attended COP30 and visited the Latvian diaspora in Nova Odessa.	

== 2026 ==
Country	Areas visited	Dates	Details	Image
Italy	Milan, Cortina d'Ampezzo	5–12 February	Attended the opening of the 2026 Winter Olympics and met with President Sergio Mattarella.	
Germany	Munich	13–15 February	Participated in the 62nd Munich Security Conference.	
Azerbaijan	Baku	21–23 April	Official visit; met with President Ilham Aliyev.	
Croatia	Dubrovnik	28–29 April	Attended the 11th Three Seas Initiative summit.	
Armenia	Yerevan	7 May	Official visit; met with President Vahagn Khachaturyan, Prime Minister Nikol Pashinyan and President of the National Assembly Alen Simonyan.	
Romania	Bucharest	13 May	Attended the Bucharest Nine summit.	
Poland	Jurata, Poznań	27–29 June	On 1st day, Edgars Rinkēvičs, together with Estonian President Alar Karis, Lithuanian President Gitanas Nausėda, Slovak President Peter Pellegrini, Czech President Petr Pavel, and Romanian President Nicușor Dan, met with Polish President Karol Nawrocki in Jurata for an informal meeting , where the discussion focused on preparations for the NATO Ankara Summit, strengthening European defense capabilities, and continued support for Ukraine. On next day, they participated in a commemoration event in Poznań to mark the 70th anniversary of the protests.	
Estonia	Ruhnu and Tallinn	1–3 July	State visit; met with President Alar Karis and Prime Minister Kristen Michal.	
Germany	Berlin	3 July	In the afternoon, Edgars Rinkēvičs, together with Estonian Prime Minister Kristen Michal and Lithuanian President Gitanas Nausėda, met with Federal Chancellor of the Federal Republic of Germany Friedrich Merz in a B3+1 format in Berlin, where they discussed close cooperation in supporting Ukraine, protecting Europe's eastern flank, and in the field of the defense industry, in order to coordinate positions before the NATO Ankara Summit.	
Turkey	Ankara	7–8 July	Rinkēvičs attended the 2026 Ankara NATO summit.	
Lithuania	Vilnius, Klaipėda and Būtingė	15–16 July	Rinkēvičs began his state visit with an official welcoming ceremony hosted by President Gitanas Nausėda. He held talks with Nausėda on bilateral relations, regional security, defence cooperation, support for Ukraine, border security, and joint infrastructure projects. During the day, Rinkēvičs also met with Speaker of the Seimas Juozas Olekas and Prime Minister Mindaugas Sinkevičius, visited Vilnius University, participated in the Latvia–Lithuania Business Forum, and laid a wreath at the memorial to Lithuania's independence defenders at Antakalnis Cemetery. On next day he continued his visit in Klaipėda, where he and President Nausėda visited the LNG terminal Independence, observed a demonstration by the Lithuanian Navy, and discussed regional energy security and maritime defence. He also delivered a lecture at Klaipėda University and received an honorary doctorate. On his return to Latvia, Rinkēvičs stopped in Būtingė to meet members of the local Latvian diaspora and the Evangelical Lutheran congregation.	
Norway	Oslo	9 September	Rinkēvičs travelled to Oslo at the invitation of King Haakon VIII of Norway to attend the funeral of King Harald V of Norway.	
United States	New York City, Los Angeles, San Diego	22–24 September	Rinkēvičs is attended the 81th United Nations General Assembly. After that moving to Los Angeles and San Diego to Economic and Latvia resident diplomacy schedule the local schedule finished the schedule.	

== Future trips ==
Country	Location	Date	Details
Hungary	Budapest	22-23 October	Rinkēvičs is expected to attend the 70th Anniversary Commemoration Ceremony Hungarian Revolution of 1956.

== Multilateral meetings ==
Multilateral meetings of the following intergovernmental organizations took place during Edgars Rinkēvičs' presidency (2023–Present).

Group	Year				
Group	2023	2024	2025	2026	2027
UNGA	19–26 September, (United States) New York City	24–30 September, (United States) New York City	23 September, (United States) New York City	22–23 September, (United States) New York City	TBD, (United States) New York City
NATO	11–12 July, (Lithuania) Vilnius	9–11 July, (United States) Washington, D.C.	24–26 June, (Netherlands) The Hague	7–8 July, (Turkey) Ankara	TBD, (Albania) Tirana
Bucharest Nine		11 June, (Latvia) Riga	2 June, (Lithuania) Vilnius	13 May, (Romania) Bucharest	TBA
Three Seas Initiative	6–7 September, (Romania) Bucharest	11 April, (Lithuania) Vilnius	28–29 April, (Poland) Warsaw	28–29 April, (Croatia) Dubrovnik	TBA
██ = Future event ██ = Did not attend / participate.
