= List of international presidential trips made by Alexander Stubb =

Alexander Stubb's foreign travels

The following is a list of overseas trips made by Alexander Stubb during his tenure as the 13th President of Finland, which began on 1 March 2024.

== 2024 ==
International trips of Alexander Stubb, President of Finland, in 2024
No.	Year	Date	Country	Location	Host(s)	Reason for visit	Other	References
1.	2024	7 March	Norway	Alta	Jonas Gahr Støre, Prime Minister of Norway	NATO's 2024 Nordic Response exercise		
2.	2024	3 April	Ukraine	Kyiv, Hostomel	Volodymyr Zelenskyy, President of Ukraine	Working visit	Agreement on security cooperation and long-term support between Ukraine and the Republic of Finland signed during this visit	
3.	2024	9–10 April	Belgium	Brussels	Jens Stoltenberg, NATO Secretary General; Alexander De Croo, Prime Minister of Belgium; Roberta Metsola, President of the European Parliament, Charles Michel, President of the European Council, Josep Borrell, High Representative of the Union for Foreign Affairs and Security Policy	Working visit	Speech in Brussels	
4.	2024	23–24 April	Sweden	Stockholm, Gothenburg	Carl XVI Gustaf, King of Sweden	State visit	Speech at the Riksdag (English); Speech at the Riksdag (Swedish); Speech at the gala dinner (English); Speech at the gala dinner (Swedish)	
5.	2024	8 May	Germany	Berlin	Frank-Walter Steinmeier, President of Germany, Olaf Scholz, Chancellor of Germany	Working visit	Speech at Hertie School in Berlin	
6.	2024	27–29 May	Estonia	Tallinn	Alar Karis, President of Estonia, Kaja Kallas, Prime Minister of Estonia	State visit	Speech in Riigikogu	
7.	2024	May 31	Sweden	Stockholm	Ulf Kristersson, Prime Minister of Sweden	Nordic summit on security and defence	Joint statement of the Nordic-Ukrainian Summit	
8.	2024	31 May–2 June	Spain	Madrid		Bilderberg Conference		
9.	2024	June 11	Latvia	Riga	Edgars Rinkēvičs, President of Latvia	Bucharest Nine Summit		
10.	2024	June 15–16	Switzerland	Bürgenstock Resort	Viola Amherd, President of Switzerland	Ukraine peace summit		
11.	2024	19–20 June	Norway	Bodø	Jonas Gahr Støre, Prime Minister of Norway	Meeting with Norwegian Prime Minister Støre and Prime Minister of Sweden Ulf Kristersson		
12.	2024	3–4 July	Italy	Rome	Sergio Mattarella, President of Italy, Giorgia Meloni, Prime Minister of Italy	Working visit		
13.	2024	9–11 July	United States	Washington, D.C.	Joe Biden, President of the United States	2024 Washington summit		
14.	2024	18 July	United Kingdom	Blenheim Palace, Woodstock, Oxfordshire	Keir Starmer, Prime Minister of the United Kingdom	4th European Political Community Summit		
15.	2024	25–29 July	France	Paris	Emmanuel Macron, President of France	Meeting with President Macron, attending the 2024 Summer Olympics		
16.	2024	30–31 August	Czech Republic	Prague	Petr Pavel, President of the Czech Republic	GLOBSEC forum, meetings with Petr Pavel and President of Serbia Aleksandar Vučić and President of Slovenia Nataša Pirc Musar		
17.	2024	10 September	Poland	Warsaw	Andrzej Duda, President of Poland	Meeting with President Duda, keynote speaker at the Polish Ambassadorial Conference, panel discussion on the security situation in the Baltic Sea Region with Radosław Sikorski, Minister of Foreign Affairs of Poland		
18.	2024	September 22–26	United States	New York, Washington, D.C.	António Guterres, UN General Secretary, Joe Biden, President of the United States	Opening of United Nations General Assembly	Speech at the UN; Statement at the General Debate of the UN General Assembly	
19.	2024	1 October	Turkey	Ankara	Recep Tayyip Erdoğan, President of Turkey	Official visit		
20.	2024	8 October	Belgium	Brussels	Philippe of Belgium, King of the Belgians; Mark Rutte, NATO Secretary General	Working visit		
21.	2024	15–17 October	Norway	Oslo, Bergen	Harald V, King of Norway	State visit		
22.	2024	21–22 October	Germany	Berlin	Frank-Walter Steinmeier, President of Germany, Olaf Scholz, Chancellor of Germany, Angela Merkel	The 25th anniversary of the Nordic Embassies		
23.	2024	29–31 October	China	Beijing, Shanghai	Xi Jinping, President of China	State visit		
24.	2024	12 November	Azerbaijan	Baku	Ilham Aliyev, President of Azerbaijan	2024 United Nations Climate Change Conference		
25.	2024	7 December	France	Paris	Emmanuel Macron, President of France	Reopening of Notre-Dame de Paris		
26.	2024	16–17 December	Estonia	Tallinn	Alar Karis, President of Estonia, Kristen Michal, Prime Minister of Estonia	Joint Expeditionary Force (JEF) Leaders' Summit		

== 2025 ==
International trips of Alexander Stubb, President of Finland, in 2025
No.	Year	Date	Country	Location	Host(s)	Reason for visit	Other	References
27.	2025	20–24 January	Switzerland	Davos	Børge Brende, President of the World Economic Forum	World Economic Forum		
28.	2025	26 January	Denmark	Copenhagen	Mette Frederiksen, Prime Minister of Denmark	Meeting of Nordic leaders		
29.	2025	27 January	Poland	Oświęcim	Marek Zając, secretary of the International Auschwitz Council	80th Anniversary of the Liberation of Auschwitz		
30.	2025	14–16 February	Germany	Munich	Christoph Heusgen, chairman of the Munich Security Conference	61st Munich Security Conference		
31.	2025	24 February	Ukraine	Kyiv	Volodymyr Zelenskyy, President of Ukraine	Show of support to Ukraine on the 3rd anniversary of the war	Joint statement by Nordic and Baltic leaders at the Support Ukraine Summit on 24 February 2025	
32.	2025	2 March	United Kingdom	London	Keir Starmer, Prime Minister of United Kingdom	2025 London Summit on Ukraine		
33.	2025	27 March	France	Paris	Emmanuel Macron, President of France	Ukraine Coalition summit		
34.	2025	29 March	United States	Mar-a-Lago, Florida	Donald Trump, President of United States	Unofficial visit		
35.	2025	31 March	(United Kingdom) Great Britain	London	Keir Starmer, Prime Minister of United Kingdom	Working visit		
36.	2025	26 April	Vatican City	St. Peter's Basilica		Guest at funeral of Pope Francis		
37.	2025	8–9 May	Norway	Oslo	Jonas Gahr Støre, Prime Minister of Norway	JEF Leaders' Summit		
38.	2025	12–14 May	Kenya	Nairobi	William Ruto, President of Kenya	State visit, to celebrate 60 years of diplomatic relations between Finland and Kenya	Statement by President of the Republic of Finland Alexander Stubb at the United Nations Office in Nairobi	
39.	2025	14–16 May	Tanzania	Dar es Salaam	Samia Suluhu Hassan, President of Tanzania	State visit, to celebrate 60 years of diplomatic relations between Finland and Tanzania		
40.	2025	18 May	Estonia	Tallinn	Alar Karis, President of Estonia	Lennart Meri Conference		
41.	2025	8–12 June	Japan	Hakui, Tokyo, Ōsaka	Shigeru Ishiba, Prime Minister of Japan	E.g. World Expo 2025 in Ōsaka	Joint statement by Stubb and Japanese Prime Minister Shigeru Ishiba	
42.	2025	13–15 June	Sweden	Stockholm	Henri de Castries, head of the Bilderberg Group	2025 Bilderberg Conference		
43.	2025	24–26 June	Netherlands	The Hague	Willem-Alexander, King of the Netherlands; Mark Rutte, Secretary General of NATO	2025 The Hague summit		
44.	2025	18 August	United States	Washington, D.C.	Donald Trump, President of United States	White House multilateral meeting on Ukraine		
45.	2025	3 September	Denmark	Copenhagen	Mette Frederiksen, Prime Minister of Denmark	Ukraine Peace negotiations		
46.	2025	4 September	France	Paris	Emmanuel Macron, President of France	Ukraine Peace negotiations		
47.	2025	11 September	Ukraine	Kyiv	Volodymyr Zelenskyy, President of Ukraine	Working visit		
48.	2025	16–17 September	Latvia	Riga	Edgars Rinkēvičs, President of Latvia	State visit		
49.	2025	22–25 September	United States	New York City	Annalena Baerbock, President of the UNGA	80th session of the UNGA, Also attend a reception hosted by US President Donald Trump and his wife Melania Trump	Joint statement on behalf of the Nordic states by President of the Republic of Finland Alexander Stubb at the UN Security Council session on Ukraine; Statement by President of the Republic of Finland, Alexander Stubb	
50.	2025	9–10 October	United States	Washington, D.C.	Donald Trump, President of the United States	Working visit together with Prime Minister Petteri Orpo		
51.	2025	28–29 October	Kazakhstan	Astana	Kassym-Jomart Tokayev, President of Kazakhstan	Working visit		
52.	2025	30–31 October	Uzbekistan	Tashkent	Shavkat Mirziyoyev, President of Uzbekistan	Working visit		
53.	2025	5–7 November	Brazil	Belém	Luiz Inácio Lula da Silva, President of Brazil	2025 United Nations Climate Change Conference		
54.	2025	17 November	Belgium	Brussels	Mark Rutte, Secretary General of NATO; Ursula von der Leyen President of the European Commission; Bart De Wever, Prime Minister of Belgium; Roberta Metsola, President of the European Parliament	Working visit		
55.	2025	20–21 November	United Arab Emirates	Dubai, Abu Dhabi	Mohammed bin Zayed Al Nahyan, President of the United Arab Emirates	Official visit		
56.	2025	22–23 November	South Africa	Johannesburg	Cyril Ramaphosa, President of South Africa	2025 G20 Johannesburg summit		
57.	2025	11–12 December	(Netherlands)	Amsterdam, The Hague	Willem-Alexander, King of the Netherlands	State visit	Speech by President of the Republic of Finland Alexander Stubb at the state banquet at the Royal Palace in Amsterdam	
58.	2025	15 December	Germany	Berlin		Ukraine Peace negotiations		

== 2026 ==
International trips of Alexander Stubb, President of Finland, in 2026
No.	Year	Date	Country	Location	Host(s)	Reason for visit	Other	References
59.	2026	6 January	France	Paris	Emmanuel Macron, President of France	Coalition of the willing Summit		
60.	2026	19–23 January	Switzerland	Davos	Børge Brende, President and CEO	56th World Economic Forum		
61.	2026	6 February	Italy	Milan / Cortina d'Ampezzo	Sergio Mattarella, President of Italy	Meeting with President Mattarella, attending the 2026 Winter Olympics		
62.	2026	13–14 February	Germany	Munich		62nd Munich Security Conference		
63.	2026	23 February	France	Paris	Emmanuel Macron, President of France	Working visit		
64.	2026	24 February	Ukraine	Kyiv	Volodymyr Zelenskyi, President of Ukraine	Working visit		
65.	2026	4–7 March	India	New Delhi, Mumbai	Droupadi Murmu, President of India; Narendra Modi, Prime Minister of India	State visit	Chief guest at the Raisina Dialogue 2026. Met with state leadership, delivered the inaugural address, and met with business leaders in Mumbai.	
66.	2026	16–17 March	(United Kingdom) Great Britain	London	Charles III, King of the United Kingdom; Keir Starmer, Prime minister of Great Britain	Working visit		
67.	2026	9–12 April	United States	Washington, D.C.		Working visit	2026 Bilderberg Conference, Brookings Institution	
68.	2026	14–15 April	Canada	Ottawa	Mark Carney, Prime minister of Canada; Mary Simon, Governor General of Canada	Working visit		
69.	2026	19–20 April	Jordan	Amman	Abdullah II, King of Jordan; Hussein bin Abdullah, Crown Prince of Jordan	Official visit		
70.	2026	21–22 April	Egypt	Cairo	Abdel Fattah el-Sisi, President of Egypt; Mostafa Madbouly, Prime Minister of Egypt	Official visit		
71.	2026	30 April	Sweden	Stockholm	Carl XVI Gustaf, King of Sweden; Ulf Kristersson, Prime Minister of Sweden	Quest	King Carl XVI Gustaf's 80th Birthday	
72.	2026	4–5 May	Czech Republic	Prague	Petr Pavel, President of the Czech Republic; Andrej Babiš, Prime Minister of the Czech Republic	Official visit		
73.	2026	13 May	Romania	Bucharest	Nicușor Dan, President of Romania	Working visit	Bucharest Nine	
74.	2026	14–15 May	Lithuania	Vilnius	Gitanas Nausėda, President of Lithuania; Inga Ruginienė, Prime Minister of Lithuania	State visit	The presidents will visit the Lithuanian and Belarusian border to inspect border control.	
75.	2026	16 May	Greece	Athens		Working visit	The Europe Gulf Forum	
76.	2026	7–8 July	Turkey	Ankara	Recep Tayyip Erdoğan, President of Turkey; Mark Rutte, Secretary General of NATO	2026 Ankara NATO summit	Attended the 37th formal NATO summit and the NATO Defence Industry Forum.	
77.	2026	13–14 July	France	Paris	Emmanuel Macron, President of France	Coalition of the Willing meeting	Participated in the Coalition of the Willing meeting in support of Ukraine and attended the Bastille Day military parade.	
78.	2026	28 July	United States	Washington, D.C., Washington National Cathedral	Donald Trump, President of United States	State funeral of Lindsey Graham, United States Senate		
79.	2026	23 August	Ukraine	Kyiv	Volodymyr Zelenskyy, President of Ukraine	Working visit	Participated in the 35th Independence Day of Ukraine.	
80.	2026	7 September	Sweden	Stockholm	Prince Daniel	Prince Daniel’s Fellowship	Participated in Prince Daniel's Fellowship Entrepreneurship Day.	
81.	2026	9 September	Norway	Oslo	Haakon, King of Norway	State funeral of Harald V	Attended the state funeral of King Harald V of Norway in Oslo Cathedral.	
82.	2026	10 September	France	Paris	Emmanuel Macron, President of France	International Space Summit	Delivered Finland's national statement at the International Space Summit.	
83.	2026	20–24 September	United States	New York	António Guterres, UN Secretary-General, Donald Trump, President of the United States	Opening of United Nations General Assembly	Led the Finnish delegation to UNGA 81 and delivered Finland's national statement.	
84.	2026	29–30 September	Luxembourg	Luxembourg City	Guillaume V, Grand Duke of Luxembourg; Stéphanie, Grand Duchess consort of Luxembourg	State visit		
85.	2026	8 October	Norway	Oslo	Haakon, King of Norway; Jonas Gahr Støre, Prime Minister of Norway	Working visit		
86.	2026	20 October	Norway	Oslo	Jonas Gahr Støre, Prime Minister of Norway	Working visit	Ukraine negotiations - Volodymyr Zelenskyi and Steve Witkoff are also present.	
87.	2026	26 October	Belgium	Brugge		Working visit	Stubb visit in College of Europe	
88.	2026	5 November	Sweden	Gothenburg		Working visit	Nordic Compass Summit	

== Future trips ==
Country	Location	Date	Details
Turkey	Antalya	9–20 November	Stubb is scheduled to attend the 2026 United Nations Climate Change Conference.
United States	Miami	14–15 December	Stubb is scheduled to attend the G20 summit.

== Multilateral meetings ==
Multilateral meetings of the following intergovernmental organizations took place during Alexander Stubb's presidency (2024–Present).

Group	Year					
Group	2024	2025	2026	2027	2028	2029
UNGA	24–27 September, (United States) New York City	22–25 September, (United States) New York City	22–28 September, (United States) New York City	TBD, (United States) New York City	TBD, (United States) New York City	TBD, (United States) New York City
G20	Not a G20 Member	22–23 November, (South Africa) Johannesburg	14–15 December, (United States) Miami	TBD	TBD	TBD
NATO	9–11 July, (United States) Washington, D.C.	24–26 June, (Netherlands) The Hague	7–8 July, (Turkey) Ankara	TBD, (Albania) Tirana	TBD	TBD
COP	12 November, (Azerbaijan) Baku	5–7 November, (Brazil) Belém	11–12 November, (Turkey) Antalya	TBD, (Ethiopia) Addis Ababa	TBD	TBD
JEF	17 December, (Estonia) Tallinn	9 May, (Norway) Oslo	26 March, (Finland) Helsinki	TBD, (Iceland) Reykjavík	TBD	TBD
Others	Bucharest Nine; 11 June, (Latvia) Riga	Securing our future 2 March, (United Kingdom) London	Together for peace and security summit 6 January, (France) Paris	TBA	TBA	TBA
Others	Global Peace Summit; 15–16 June, (Switzerland) Lucerne	15 March, (videoconference); United Kingdom	Bucharest Nine; 13 May, (Romania) Bucharest			
Others	Global Peace Summit; 15–16 June, (Switzerland) Lucerne	Building a robust peace for Ukraine and Europe; 27 March, (France) Paris	Determined to act 13 July, (France) Paris			
██ = Future event.
