= List of international prime ministerial trips made by Petteri Orpo =

This is a list of international prime ministerial trips made by Petteri Orpo, the current prime minister of Finland since 20 June 2023.

== Trips ==
=== Summary ===
Orpo has visited 23 countries during his tenure as prime minister. The number of visits per country where Orpo has traveled are:

- One visit to Albania, Armenia, China, Cyprus, Hungary, Iceland, India, Italy, Japan, Latvia, Lithuania, Spain, United Arab Emirates and the United States
- Two visit to Denmark, France, Norway, Poland, and Ukraine
- Three visits to Estonia
- Four visits to Germany
- Six visits to Sweden
- Twelve visits to Belgium

=== 2023 ===
Country	Location(s)	Dates	Details
Iceland	Vestmannaeyjar	25–26 June	Orpo travelled to Vestmannaeyjar in Iceland to meet with Nordic Prime Ministers Katrín Jakobsdóttir (Iceland), Ulf Kristersson (Sweden), Mette Frederiksen (Denmark) and Jonas Gahr Støre (Norway) as well as Canadian prime minister Justin Trudeau and leaders from the Faroe Islands, Greenland and Åland. They discussed security policy, crisis preparedness issues and the green transition.
Belgium	Brussels	29 June	Attended European People's Party summit. Met with President of the European Commission Ursula von der Leyen.
Estonia	Tallinn	5 July	Met with Prime Minister Kaja Kallas and President Alar Karis.
Germany	Berlin	14 July	Met with German chancellor Olaf Scholz. This marks Orpo's first official visit to Germany since taking office.
Belgium	Brussels	17-18 July	Orpo attends the EU-CELAC Summit.
Ukraine	Kyiv	23 August	Held talks with Ukrainian president Volodymyr Zelenskyy. At a press conference after the meeting, Zelensky noted that Finnish companies are active in reconstruction.
Sweden	Harpsund	25 August	Orpo met Swedish Prime Minister Ulf Kristersson at his summer residence. They discussed bilateral relations, defence cooperation, European security, support for Ukraine, the green transition and competitiveness.
France	Paris	4 October	Met with President Emmanuel Macron. They discussed cooperation of Finland and France. Orpo also met with Prime Minister Élisabeth Borne.
Spain	Granada	5–6 October	Orpo attended the 3rd European Political Community Summit.
Norway	Oslo	31 October	Orpo attended the Nordic Council. He met with the Nordic Prime Ministers Jonas Gahr Støre (Norway), Katrín Jakobsdóttir (Iceland), Mette Frederiksen (Denmark) and Ulf Kristersson (Sweden) as well as with Aksel V. Johannesen (Faroe Islands), Múte Bourup Egede (Greenland) and Veronica Thörnroos (Åland Islands). Kristersson also laid out Swedens agenda for their 2024 Presidency of the Nordic Council of Ministers.
Denmark	Copenhagen	14 November	Orpo travelled to Copenhagen to meet with Prime Ministers Mette Frederiksen (Denmark), Ulf Kristersson (Sweden), Leo Varadkar (Ireland), Nikolay Denkov (Bulgaria) and Evika Siliņa (Latvia).
United Arab Emirates	Dubai	1–2 December	Orpo attended the 2023 United Nations Climate Change Conference.
Belgium	Brussels	13–15 December	Orpo attended the EU-Western Balkans summit followed by the European Council.

=== 2024 ===
Country	Location(s)	Dates	Details
Sweden	Stockholm, Nacka	19 January	Orpo met Kristersson and Ursula von der Leyen, President of the European Commission, to discuss EU priorities for 2024–2029, including competitiveness, security, the green transition, bioeconomy and the circular economy. They also visited Stora Enso's biomaterials innovation laboratory in Nacka.
Poland	Warsaw	16 February	Met with Prime Minister Donald Tusk. They discussed protection of borders in Eastern Europe.
Belgium	Brussels	21 March	Orpo attended the European Council summit.
Poland	Warsaw	11 April	Met with Polish Prime Minister Donald Tusk, President of the European Council Charles Michel, Greek Prime Minister Kyriakos Mitsotakis, Estonian Prime Minister Kaja Kallas, Tánaiste Micheál Martin, Luxembourgish Prime Minister Luc Frieden and Spanish Prime Minister Pedro Sánchez in Warsaw, with the aim of preparing a vision of the European Union's priorities for the next five years. The draft Action Plan was to be approved at the European Council in June.
Sweden	Stockholm	13-14 May	Meeting with German Chancellor Olaf Scholz, Prime Minister Ulf Kristersson, Danish Prime Minister Mette Frederiksen, Icelandic Prime Minister Bjarni Benediktsson and Norwegian Prime Minister Jonas Gahr Støre.
Latvia	Riga	24 May	Working visit. Met with Prime Minister Evika Siliņa.
Germany	Berlin	11–12 June	Attended Ukraine Recovery Conference.
Sweden	Stockholm	16 September	Orpo participated in a joint session of the Finnish and Swedish governments, hosted by Kristersson. Discussions included European security, support for Ukraine, crime prevention, fossil-free energy, research and innovation, cultural exchanges and tourism. The governments adopted a joint declaration on further cooperation.
Hungary	Budapest	7–8 November	Orpo attended the 5th European Political Community Summit and an informal European Council summit.
Sweden	Harpsund	26–27 November	Attended Nordic-Baltic Summit hosted by Swedish prime minister Ulf Kristersson.
Japan	Tokyo, Osaka, Kyoto	9–12 December	Orpo travelled to Tokyo to meet with Prime Minister Shigeru Ishiba.

=== 2025 ===
Country	Location(s)	Dates	Details
Germany	Berlin	17–18 January	Attended the EPP Leaders’ Retreat. He also met with leader of the opposition and leader of the Christian Democratic Union, Friedrich Merz.
Belgium	Brussels	3 February	Orpo attended an informal European Council summit.
France	Paris	10–11 February	Orpo travelled to Paris to attend the Artificial Intelligence Action Summit.
Belgium	Brussels	20–21 March	Orpo attended a European Council summit.
Albania	Tirana	16 May	Orpo attended the 6th European Political Community Summit.
Ukraine	Kyiv	28 May	
Lithuania	Vilnius	2 June	Attended Bucharest Nine Summit.
Belgium	Brussels	26–27 June	Orpo attended the European Council meeting.
Italy	Rome	10–11 July	Attended Ukraine Recovery Conference.
Estonia	Tallinn	22 August	Official visit. Met with Prime Minister Kristen Michal and Minister of Foreign Affairs Margus Tsahkna.
Denmark	Copenhagen	2 October	Orpo attended the 7th European Political Community Summit.
United States	Washington D.C.	9–10 October	Working visit together with President of Finland Alexander Stubb. Met with US president Donald Trump.
Sweden	Stockholm	28 October	Orpo attended a meeting of Nordic heads of government and the Nordic Council's 77th plenary session. Discussions focused on Nordic cooperation, regional security, Russia's actions in the Baltic Sea region and the war in Ukraine.

=== 2026 ===
Country	Location(s)	Dates	Details
China	Beijing	25–28 January	Met with President Xi Jinping.
Belgium	Brussels	22 January	Orpo attended an informal European Council summit.
Belgium	Antwerp, Rijkhoven	11–12 February	Orpo attended the 3rd European Industry Summit. Next day participated in the informal meeting of EU heads of state and government.
India	New Delhi	17–20 February	Attended AI Impact Summit.
Norway	Oslo	15 March	Orpo attended an Nordic-Canadian summit in Olso and met with Nordic leaders and Canadian prime minister Mark Carney.
Belgium	Brussels	19–20 March	Orpo attended the European Council.
Cyprus	Nicosia	23–24 April	Orpo attended an informal meeting of the European Council summit.
Armenia	Yerevan	3–4 May	Orpo attended the 8th European Political Community Summit.
Estonia	Tallinn	9 June	Attended NB8 Prime Ministers’ Meeting.
Belgium	Brussels	18–19 June	Orpo attended the European Council.
Germany	Berlin	27 August	Petteri Orpo visited Berlin, where he met with German Chancellor Friedrich Merz, Danish Prime Minister Mette Frederiksen and Austrian Chancellor Christian Stocker to discuss the EU's Multiannual Financial Framework for 2028–2034. The leaders discussed the priorities and financing of the next EU budget, including EU competitiveness, security and defence, migration, and support for Ukraine. They subsequently held a joint press conference at the Federal Chancellery.
Belgium	Brussels	15–16 October	Orpo attended the European Council.

== Future trips ==
Country	Location	Date	Details
Hungary	Budapest	22-23 October	Orpo is plan to attend the 70th Anniversary Commemoration Ceremony Hungarian Revolution of 1956.
Ireland	Dublin	12 November	Orpo is plan to attend the 9th European Political Community Summit.

== Multilateral meetings ==
Petteri Orpo participated in the following summits during his premiership:

Group	Year			
Group	2023	2024	2025	2026
Ukraine Recovery Conference	21–22 June, (United Kingdom) London	11–12 June, (Germany) Berlin	10–11 July, (Italy) Rome	25–26 June, (Poland) Gdańsk
EU–CELAC	17–18 July, (Belgium) Brussels	None	9–10 November, (Colombia) Santa Marta	None
EPC	5 October, (Spain) Granada	18 July,^{[a]} (United Kingdom) Woodstock	16 May, (Albania) Tirana	4 May, (Armenia) Yerevan
EPC	5 October, (Spain) Granada	7 November, (Hungary) Budapest	2 October, (Denmark) Copenhagen	12 November, (Republic of Ireland) Dublin
Others	None	None	Bucharest Nine; 2 June, (Lithuania) Vilnius	TBA
██ = Future event ██ = Did not attend / participate.^aPresident Alexander Stubb attended in the prime minister's place.

== See also ==
- Foreign relations of Finland
- List of international presidential trips made by Alexander Stubb
