= Ottawa Declaration =

Ottawa Declaration may refer to:

- The 1996 Ottawa Declaration that established the Arctic Council
- The 1974 NATO Ottawa Declaration on Atlantic Relations
