= Agreement on 5% NATO defence spending by 2035 =

2025 NATO spending agreement

At the 2025 The Hague NATO summit, member states pledged to increase defence spending to five percent of GDP in what is called The Hague Investment Plan.

The Agreement on 5% Defence Spending by 2035 was the principal outcome of the 2025 NATO Summit, held in The Hague, the Netherlands, on 24–25 June 2025. Under this declaration, all 32 NATO member states except Spain, which received an exemption, committed to raising their annual defence and security-related expenditures to 5% of gross domestic product (GDP) by 2035, with progress to be reviewed in 2029.

== Prelude ==
In preparation for the summit, several countries had reported on what they believed delegates would discuss. According to Al Jazeera, the United Kingdom, France, Germany, and the Nordic countries hope to formulate a multi-year plan to manage funding cuts if the U.S. pulls out of NATO. Moreover, NATO would propose a plan to require Europe and Canada to "boost its weapons and equipment stockpiles by 30%, which would be done amid current uncertainty regarding the US ongoing role in NATO contribution.

Also ahead of the summit, three Baltic defence ministers discussed the need for increased contributions to NATO. Thus, Estonian Minister of Defence Hanno Pevkur stated: "The Baltic countries have already raised their spending, and now we [NATO] must work together to make this understanding clearer among all allies".

The NATO summit discussed increasing members' yearly fiscal contributions for defence spending. NATO considers a target percentage of GDP for defence spending allocation. The United States has expressed its goal of making each NATO member state contribute at least 5% of its GDP to defence budgets. Poland has responded to this request ahead of The Hague Summit by pushing its defence spending to 4.7% of GDP. Similarly, as of 13 June 2025, the Dutch caretaker cabinet had decided to increase the defence budget to 3.5% of the gross domestic product. In addition, they intend to spend 1.5% of GDP on matters that benefit defence, with which the Netherlands aims to meet the 5% requirement. In his first speech as the new NATO Secretary-General, Mark Rutte stated that the organisation should "shift to a wartime mindset and turbo charge our defence production and defence spending".

According to Reuters, one of only five paragraphs of summit's closing statement is to say: "We reaffirm our ironclad commitment to collective defence as enshrined in Article 5 of the Washington Treaty - that an attack on one is an attack on all."

== Background ==
Since the 2014 Wales Summit, NATO has urged member countries to allocate at least 2% of GDP to defence, a benchmark that many states struggled to meet. Growing security threats—such as Russia's invasion of Ukraine, cyber vulnerabilities, and doubts about sustained U.S. strategic commitment—intensified calls for a higher spending floor.

Prior to the summit, Poland and the Baltic states, already approaching or exceeding 4%, championed ambitious targets, framing higher spending as essential deterrence.

Under the Trump administration, the U.S. parted ways with the bipartisan foreign policy consensus, based on "...Trump's belief that NATO and US's other major alliances should be explicitly organised as protection rackets rather than as partnerships".

== The 5% spending target ==
=== Structure and definition ===
NATO leaders agreed to a two-tiered spending formula:

- 3.5% of GDP for core military expenditures: personnel, operations, equipment, and maintenance.
- 1.5% of GDP for security-related spending: cyberdefence, supply chain resilience, critical infrastructure, logistics, civil preparedness and resilience, defence industrial base, and innovation.

=== Timeline and progress review ===
National roadmaps describing how to meet the target had to be submitted by mid‑2026.

A collective review of progress is scheduled for 2029, with the final deadline set at 2035.

== Adoption and reactions ==
At the 24–25 June The Hague Summit, the declaration was approved by consensus.

NATO Secretary-General Mark Rutte described it as a "transformational leap" for collective defence, while U.S. President Donald Trump called it a "historic achievement", noting it represented a doubling of the previous 2% target and saying it would cement NATO's relevance.

=== Support ===
"Eastern flank" countries (Poland, Lithuania, Estonia) strongly supported the move, viewing it as necessary for deterrence.

UK Prime Minister Keir Starmer pledged to meet the 5% target by 2035, with 3.5% for direct defence and 1.5% for resilience, though concerns were raised about the lack of detailed funding plans.

=== Reservations ===
Spain, Belgium, Germany, and Italy voiced reservations.

Spain received an exemption, citing domestic budget constraints and welfare priorities.

Critics warned that including security-related items could allow countries to meet targets on paper without enhancing military capability.

== Strategic and economic implications ==
=== Defence industry ===
A NATO-wide shift to 5% could significantly increase global defense spending, creating opportunities for firms like Lockheed Martin, BAE Systems, Rheinmetall, and others to expand arms production and R&D.

=== Economic impact ===
For Europe, reaching 3.5% core spending alone would require raising defence budgets by hundreds of billions of euros annually; factoring in broader security-related spending could push totals well over €1 trillion.

=== Security posture ===
The commitment aims to enhance NATO's ability to deter and respond to threats—especially from Russia, hybrid warfare, and emerging technologies.

== Spanish exemption ==
Spain's rejected NATO's 2025 mandate for all member countries to raise defense expenditures to 5% of GDP by 2035. Spain, led by Prime Minister Pedro Sánchez, has insisted it will cap its defence budget at 2.1% of GDP, citing fiscal and social spending concerns. This stance triggered friction with the United States, a NATO member and world's largest weapons exporter, with the latter's leader, Donald Trump, threatening that his country will be paid back by Spain through tariffs instead.

Analysts point out that Spain tends to spend more on defense than is budgeted through extraordinary contributions, sometimes exceeding the official budget by 20% to 30%.

Spain formally requested to be exempt from the 5% target. Prime Minister Pedro Sánchez, in a letter to NATO Secretary General Mark Rutte, described the 5% goal as "unreasonable and counterproductive".

Sánchez explained that an expenditure of 5% GDP on defence would be "disproportionate and unnecessary". He also favoured to advance in "strategic autonomy" rather than depending excessively in the military industry of other countries, arguing that "it is not about spending more, but spending better, and doing it in a coordinated way. Rushing to get to 5% would only reinforce our dependence [from foreign suppliers] and harm national economic growth", and, finally, he argued that the aforementioned percentage was incompatible with a State providing welfare to its nationals. He also stated that, in order for Spain to reach the capabilities targets agreed on 5 June 2025, the Spanish Armed Forces had estimated a 2.1% GDP spending.

Spain subsequently agreed to be excluded from the 5% requirement in the final summit text, although the declaration still stipulates the 2035 timeline and 2029 review date. Rutte, while recognising Spain's domestic concerns, emphasised that all allies are expected to increase defense investment. He described Spain's stance as "flexible exemption" but cautioned that exceptions should not undermine collective resolve.

U.S. President Donald Trump criticised Spain's position, labelling it "very terrible" and threatened that "Spain will pay double" in future trade negotiations. He also suggested that allies who do not meet the 5% threshold could "lose U.S. protection". Trump also threatened Spain stating that they "will have to pay it back to us [the United States] on trade because I am not going to let that happen.

Spain's stance, along with concerns voiced by Italy, Belgium, and Slovakia, led to intense internal negotiations. NATO diplomats reframed key summit language—from "we commit" to "allies commit"—to accommodate dissent while preserving the integrity of the agreement. Sánchez asserted that Spain "never blocks NATO but fulfils its responsibilities" and emphasised its ongoing capabilities under the 2.1% model.

Spain's challenge highlights a growing tension in NATO between national fiscal priorities and unified security commitments. While Eastern European nations and the UK broadly support the 5% escalation, Spain argues that its defense capabilities—backed by personnel, deployments, and industry—are achievable without a fixed GDP percentage. This dispute has also underscored deeper EU–NATO dynamics: Spain pointed to its broader European defense strategy, suggesting that the EU's consolidated defense investment frameworks should be prioritized over unilateral NATO spending mandates.

A formal review in 2029 will assess whether Spain, exempt under the 5% rule, has delivered on capability and readiness goals aligned with alliance needs. If Spain fails to uphold these obligations, it risks further diplomatic isolation within NATO and potential U.S. political or economic pressure. The conflict reflects enduring challenges in balancing allied solidarity with individual countries' fiscal and political contexts, at a time when NATO seeks to adapt to resurging great-power threats.

In October 2025, the U.S. said "They have no excuse not to do this, but that's alright. Maybe you should throw 'em out of NATO frankly".

== See also ==
- 2014 Wales NATO Summit
- Russia-NATO relations
- NATO summit
- 2024 Washington NATO summit
- Spain–United States relations
