= 2027 Tirana NATO summit =

NATO diplomatic conference in Albania

NATO Summit Tirana 2027 2027 Tirana Summit
- Host country: Albania
- Date: TBD 2027
- City: Tirana
- Follows: 2026 Ankara NATO summit
- Website: www.nato.int

The 2027 Tirana summit is a future meeting of heads of state and heads of government of NATO member states, scheduled to be held in Tirana, Albania, in 2027. The decision to hold the summit in Tirana was announced at the 2025 The Hague NATO summit, where NATO leaders unanimously agreed to Albania's hosting. It will be the 37th NATO summit and the first with host Albania since joining the alliance in 2009.

== Participants ==
Key
Non-NATO member

Country or organization	Head of delegation	Title	Ref.
NATO	Mark Rutte	Secretary General	
Albania	Edi Rama (host)	Prime Minister	
Belgium	Bart De Wever	Prime Minister	
Bulgaria	Rumen Radev	Prime Minister	
Canada	Mark Carney	Prime Minister	
Croatia	Zoran Milanović	President	
Czech Republic	Petr Pavel	President	
Denmark	Mette Frederiksen	Prime Minister	
Estonia	Ülle Madise	President	
Finland	Alexander Stubb	President	
France	TBD	President	
Germany	Friedrich Merz	Chancellor	
Greece	Kyriakos Mitsotakis	Prime Minister	
Hungary	Péter Magyar	Prime Minister	
Iceland	Kristrún Frostadóttir	Prime Minister	
Italy	Giorgia Meloni	Prime Minister	
Latvia	Edgars Rinkēvičs	President	
Lithuania	Gitanas Nauseda	President	
Luxembourg	Luc Frieden	Prime Minister	
Montenegro	Jakov Milatović	President	
Netherlands	Rob Jetten	Prime Minister	
North Macedonia	Gordana Siljanovska-Davkova	President	
Norway	Jonas Gahr Støre	Prime Minister	
Poland	Karol Nawrocki	President	
Portugal	Luis Montenegro	Prime Minister	
Romania	Nicușor Dan	President	
Slovakia	Peter Pellegrini	President	
Slovenia	Janez Janša	Prime Minister	
Spain	Pedro Sánchez	Prime Minister	
Sweden	Magdalena Andersson	Prime Minister	
Turkey	Recep Tayyip Erdoğan	President	
United Kingdom	Andy Burnham	Prime Minister	
United States	Donald Trump	President	

=== Invited non-NATO members ===
Country or organisation	Invitee	Title	Attendance	Ref.
European Union	António Costa	President of the European Council		
European Union	Ursula von der Leyen	President of the European Commission		

== See also ==
- NATO summit
- Albania and NATO
