= Veterans' Day (Netherlands) =

Annual day of remembrance

Veterans Day
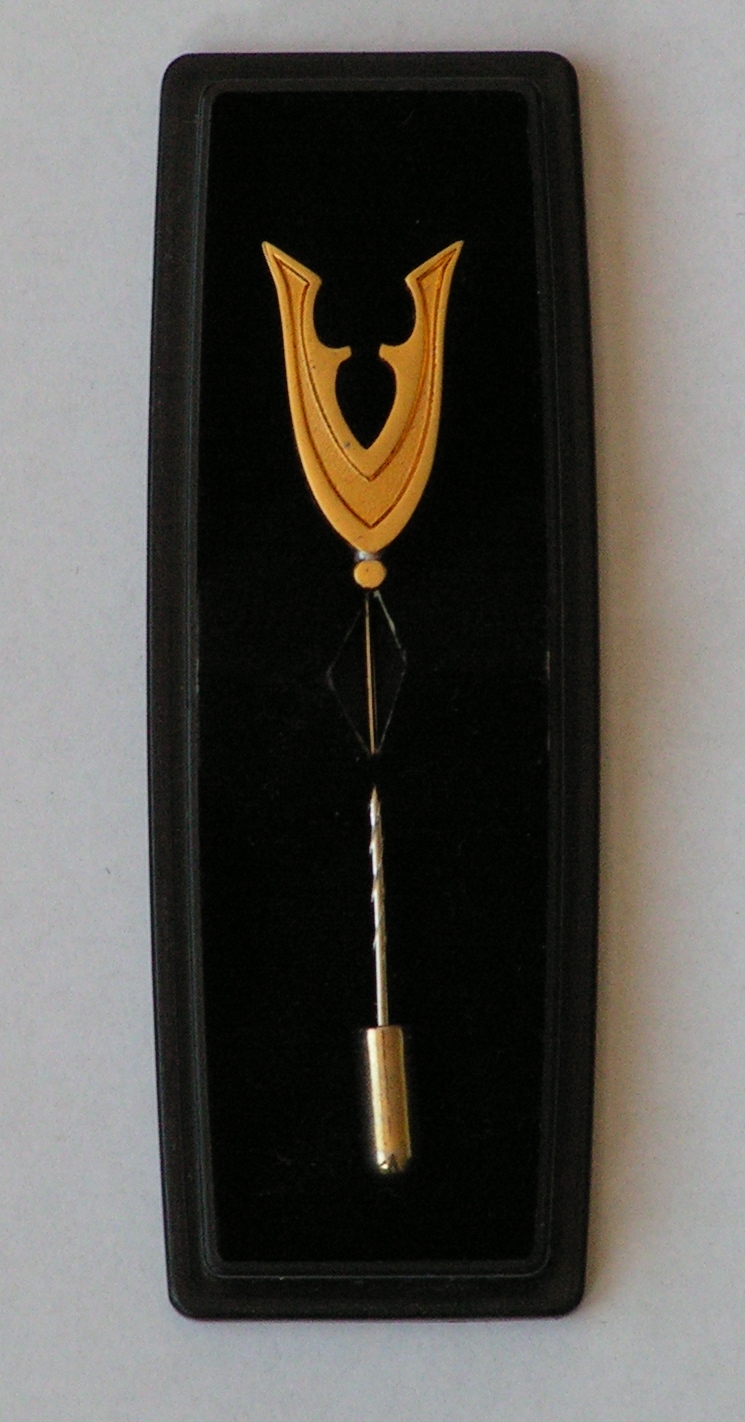
- ensign of the Veterans
- Official name: Nederlandse Veteranendag
- Observed by: Netherlands
- Significance: day of remembrance for the country's servicemen
- Frequency: annual

Veteranendag (Veterans' Day) is the Netherlands' annual day of remembrance for the country's servicemen. Since 2005 it has been organized on the birthday of the late Prince Bernhard. It is held on the last Saturday of June.
