= 2026 Ankara NATO summit =

NATO diplomatic conference in Turkey

NATO Summit Ankara 2026 2026 Ankara Summit
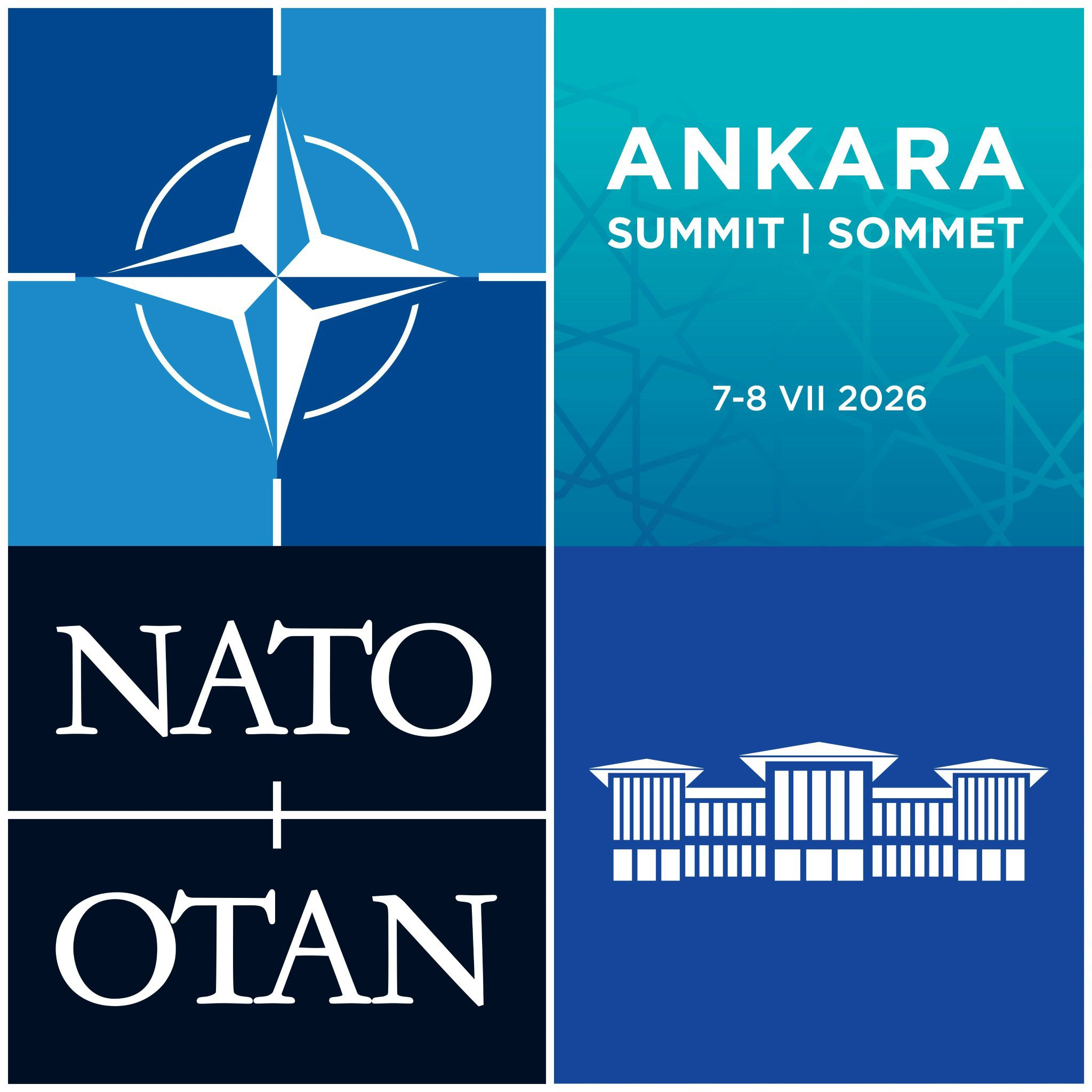
- Host country: Turkey
- Date: 7–8 July 2026
- City: Ankara
- Venues: Presidential Complex
- Follows: 2025 The Hague NATO summit
- Precedes: 2027 Tirana NATO summit
- Website: www.nato.int

The 2026 Ankara summit was a meeting of heads of state and heads of government of NATO member states, held in Ankara, Turkey, on 7–8 July 2026. It is the 36th NATO summit and the second hosted by Turkey following the 2004 summit in Istanbul. The summit took place at the Presidential Complex.

== Infrastructure and preparations ==
Prior to the summit, extensive infrastructure and urban renewal projects were carried out along the primary transit routes and surrounding areas of the venue. Coordinated by the Ministry of Transport and Infrastructure and the Ankara Metropolitan Municipality, major road expansion, resurfacing, and intersection modernization projects were completed on the highway connecting Esenboğa International Airport to the summit center. As part of urban beautification efforts, the facades of buildings located on protocol routes were repainted, and large-scale landscaping and smart signaling systems were implemented.

== Security measures and protests ==
The Governorship of Ankara announced a comprehensive ban on all rallies, demonstrations, and leaflet distributions across the province, effective from 28 June to 10 July 2026. Extensive security measures led to the closure of several main arteries to traffic, and administrative leave was granted to certain public personnel for the duration of the event.

In the two weeks leading up to the summit, anti-NATO protests took place in several cities, including Istanbul, Ankara, and Izmir. Demonstrations led by labor unions and various non-governmental organizations opposed increased military budgets and NATO's expansion policies. According to reports from Human Rights Watch (HRW) and local rights advocates, anti-terror operations and crackdowns targeting protesters resulted in the detention of over 200 individuals, including activists, lawyers, and journalists.

== Participants ==
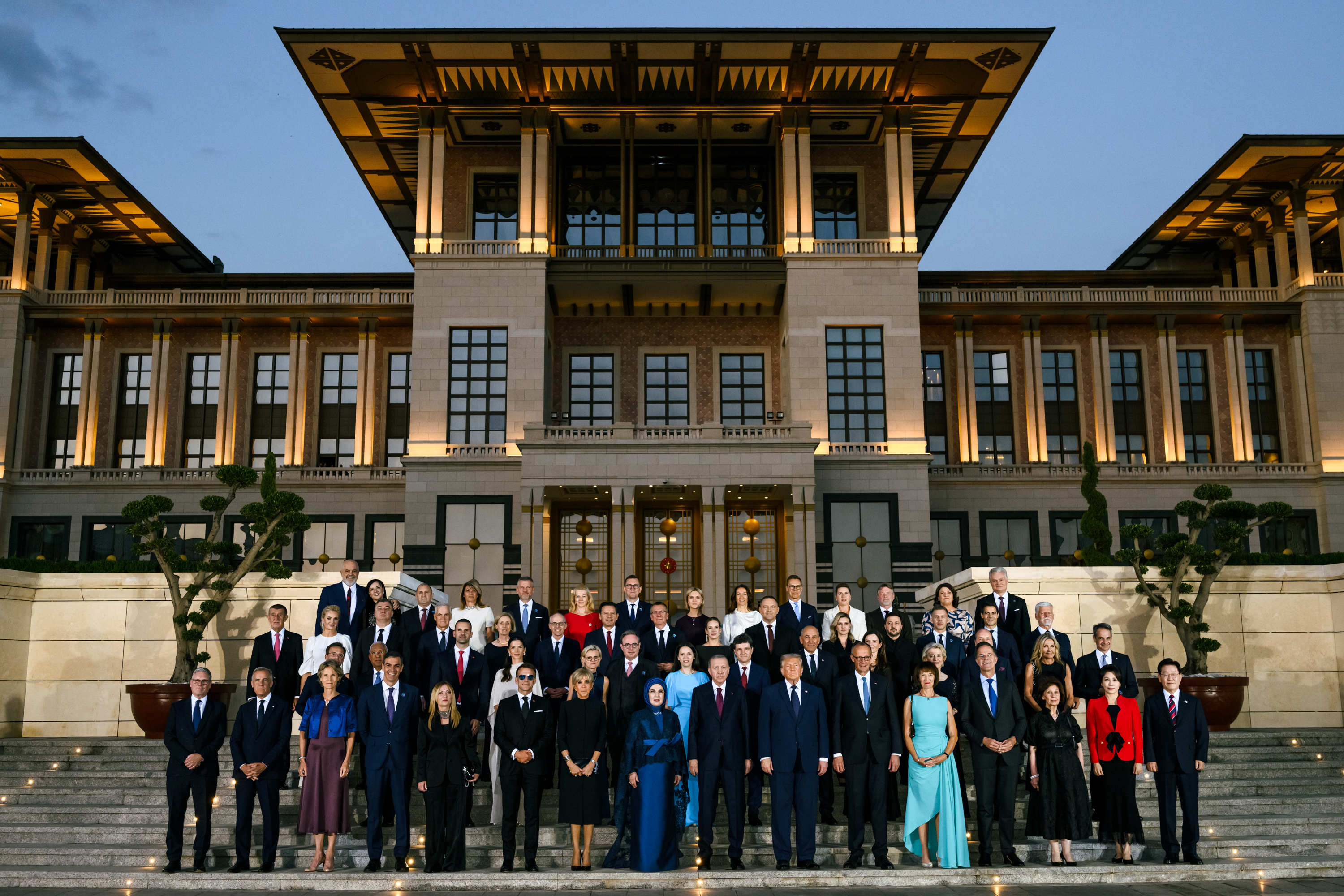
Official photo with guests of the Summit during the dinner at Presidential Palace in Ankara

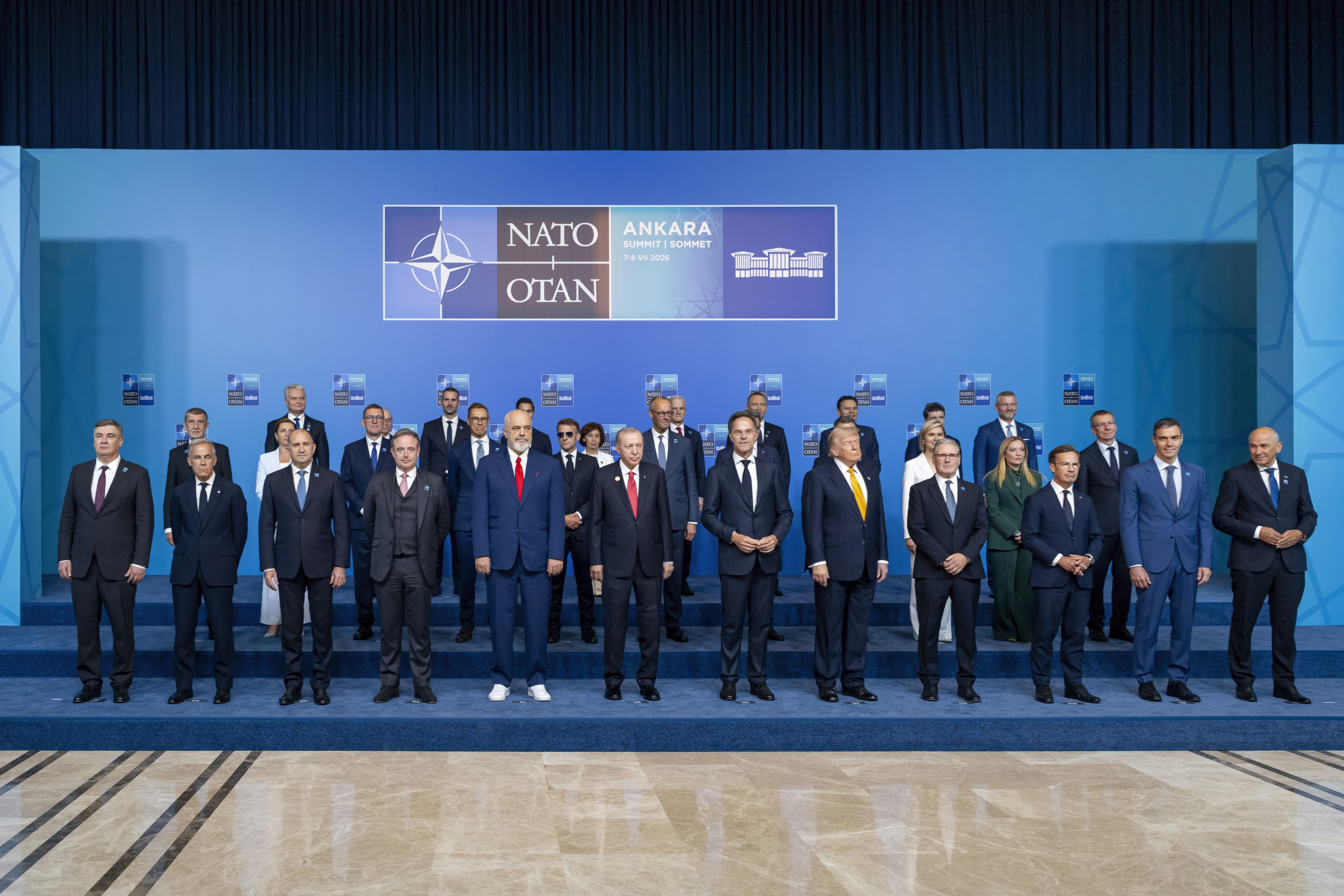
Family photo of the 2026 Ankara summit

Country or organization	Head of delegation	Title	Ref.
NATO	Mark Rutte	Secretary General	
Albania	Edi Rama	Prime Minister	
Belgium	Bart De Wever	Prime Minister	
Bulgaria	Rumen Radev	Prime Minister	
Canada	Mark Carney	Prime Minister	
Croatia	Zoran Milanović	President	
Czech Republic	Andrej Babiš and Petr Pavel (Note: The government initially refused to grant accreditation to the President, despite the established tradition of the President attending NATO summits. In response, the President filed a competence dispute with the Constitutional Court of the Czech Republic. While the Court has not yet ruled on the core issue, it issued a preliminary injunction ordering the government to accredit the President. Consequently, as of June 2026, both the President and the Prime Minister claim the role of the head of the delegation.)	Prime Minister / President	
Denmark	Mette Frederiksen	Prime Minister	
Estonia	Kristen Michal	Prime Minister	
Finland	Alexander Stubb	President	
France	Emmanuel Macron	President	
Germany	Friedrich Merz	Chancellor	
Greece	Kyriakos Mitsotakis	Prime Minister	
Hungary	Péter Magyar	Prime Minister	
Iceland	Kristrún Frostadóttir	Prime Minister	
Italy	Giorgia Meloni	Prime Minister	
Latvia	Edgars Rinkēvičs	President	
Lithuania	Gitanas Nauseda	President	
Luxembourg	Luc Frieden	Prime Minister	
Montenegro	Milojko Spajić	Prime Minister	
Netherlands	Rob Jetten	Prime Minister	
North Macedonia	Gordana Siljanovska-Davkova	President	
Norway	Jonas Gahr Støre	Prime Minister	
Poland	Karol Nawrocki	President	
Portugal	Luis Montenegro	Prime Minister	
Romania	Nicușor Dan	President	
Slovakia	Peter Pellegrini	President	
Slovenia	Janez Janša	Prime Minister	
Spain	Pedro Sánchez	Prime Minister	
Sweden	Ulf Kristersson	Prime Minister	
Turkey	Recep Tayyip Erdoğan (host)	President	
United Kingdom	Keir Starmer	Prime Minister	
United States	Donald Trump	President	

=== Invited non-NATO members ===
Country or organization	Invitee	Title	Attendance	Ref.
Australia	Pat Conroy	Minister for Defence Industry		
Azerbaijan	Ilham Aliyev	President	Absent	
Bahrain	Abdullatif bin Rashid Al Zayani	Foreign Minister		
European Union	António Costa	President of the European Council	Present	
European Union	Ursula von der Leyen	President of the European Commission	Present	
Japan	Shinjirō Koizumi	Defence Minister	Present	
Japan	Toshimitsu Motegi	Foreign Minister	Present	
Kuwait	Jarrah Jaber Al-Ahmad Al-Sabah	Foreign Minister	Present	
New Zealand	Chris Penk	Minister of Defence		
Qatar	Mohammed bin Abdulrahman bin Jassim Al Thani	Foreign Minister		
South Korea	Lee Jae Myung	President	Present	
Syria	Ahmed al-Sharaa	President	Present	
Ukraine	Volodymyr Zelenskyy	President	Present	
United Arab Emirates	Abdullah bin Zayed Al Nahyan	Foreign Minister		

== See also ==
- 2004 Istanbul NATO summit
- Turkey in NATO
