= 2025 The Hague NATO summit =

NATO diplomatic conference in the Netherlands

NATO Summit The Hague 2025 The Hague•La Haye 24–25 VI 2025 Summit•Sommet
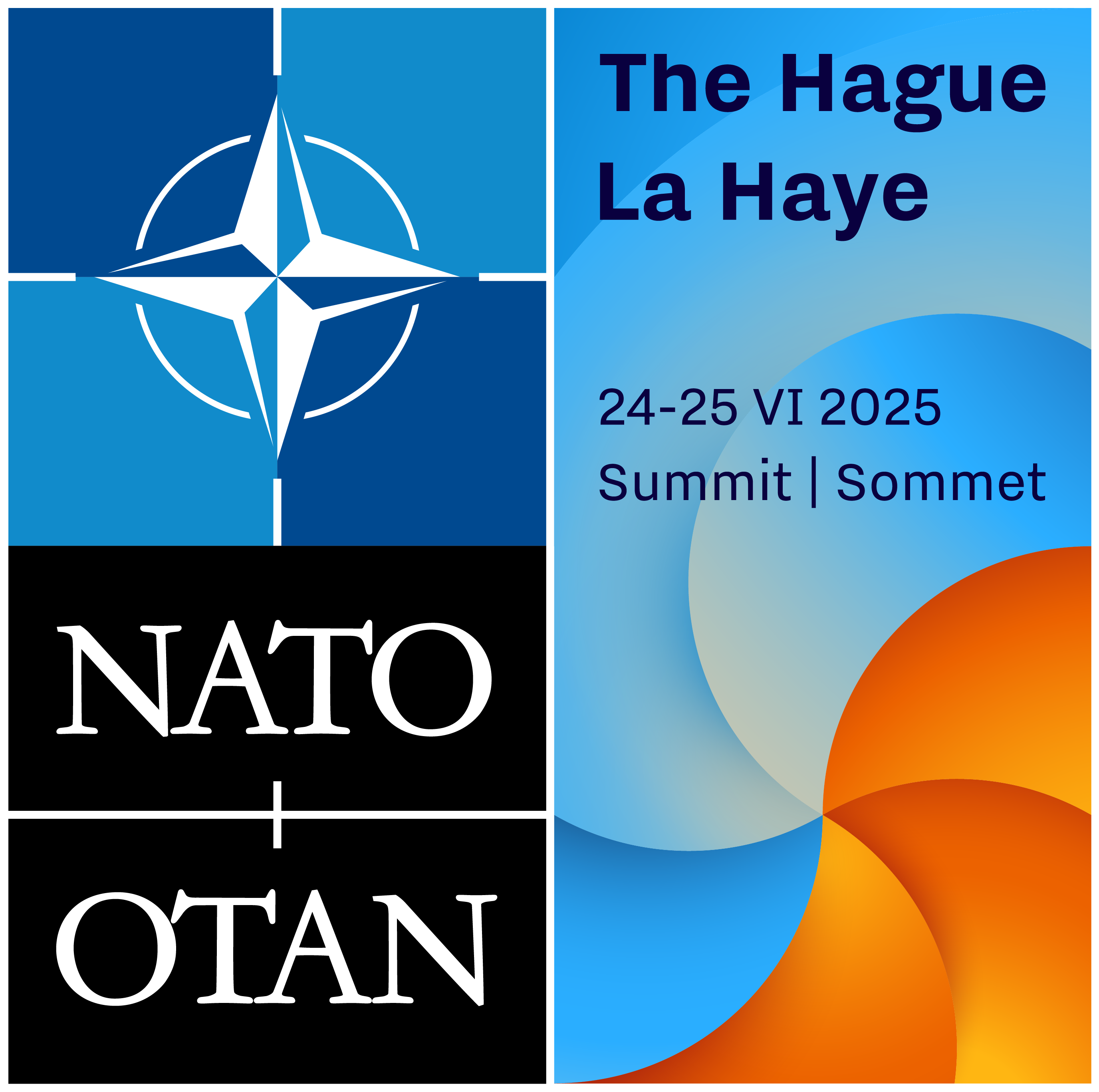
- Host country: Netherlands
- Date: 24–25 June 2025
- Cities: The Hague
- Venues: World Forum
- Follows: 2024 Washington NATO summit
- Precedes: 2026 Ankara NATO summit
- Website: www.nato.int/cps/en/natohq/235800.htm

The 2025 The Hague summit was a meeting of the heads of state and heads of government of the thirty-two members of the North Atlantic Treaty Organization (NATO), their partner countries, and the European Union (EU). It was held in The Hague, Netherlands, on 24–25 June 2025.

As the first NATO summit ever hosted by the Netherlands, it marked the inaugural summit for new NATO secretary general Mark Rutte, a former prime minister of the Netherlands and a native of The Hague. The summit focused on member states' pledge to increase defence spending to five percent of GDP.

While Australia and South Korea were also invited, only the prime minister of New Zealand and Japan's senior-level delegation represented non-Atlantic partner countries. On the sides of the summit, bilateral meetings, including between Donald Trump, US president, and, separately, Volodymyr Zelenskyy, president of Ukraine, and Recep Tayyip Erdoğan, president of Turkey, were held.

== Background ==
It was decided at the 2023 Vilnius NATO summit that the Netherlands would host the 2025 summit. This marked the first instance that a NATO summit took place in the country. The exact date and location, the World Forum in The Hague, were announced by outgoing NATO Secretary General Jens Stoltenberg in May 2024. The last major diplomatic conference held in The Hague's same venue was the 2014 Nuclear Security Summit, and the city was chosen over Rotterdam, Apeldoorn, and Maastricht.

Willem-Alexander, King of the Netherlands, reviewed the preparedness of the summit's venue during his visit there on 23 June. During the summit it became clear the Dutch royal family played a key role in personal diplomacy aimed at ensuring Donald Trump remained engaged with the alliance.

In the lead-up to the summit, several countries reported on anticipated topics of discussion. According to Al Jazeera, the United Kingdom, France, Germany and the Nordic countries hoped to formulate a multi-year plan to address potential funding gaps in the event of a U.S. withdrawal from NATO. Under this plan, European nations would contribute more funding to the organization because the US contributes 66% of the NATO defense budget as of 2025. Additionally, NATO proposed a plan to require Europe and Canada to "boost its weapons and equipment stockpiles by 30 percent, which would be done amid current uncertainty regarding the US ongoing role in NATO contribution". This multi-year plan was ultimately not discussed or addressed during the summit.

The United States had advocated for each member to contribute at least 5% of its GDP to defense budgets since the election of Donald Trump in 2024. In response, Poland announced a defense spending increase to 4.7% of GDP ahead of the summit. Similarly, prior to the summit as of 13 June 2025, the Dutch caretaker cabinet committed to increasing its defense budget to 3.5% of GDP, with an additional 1.5% allocated to related defense-beneficial areas to meet the 5% target.

Defense ministers from three Baltic countries also emphasized the need for increased NATO contributions. Estonian Defense Minister Hanno Pevkur stated, "The Baltic countries have already raised their spending, and now we [NATO] must work together to make this understanding clearer among all allies."

== Agenda ==
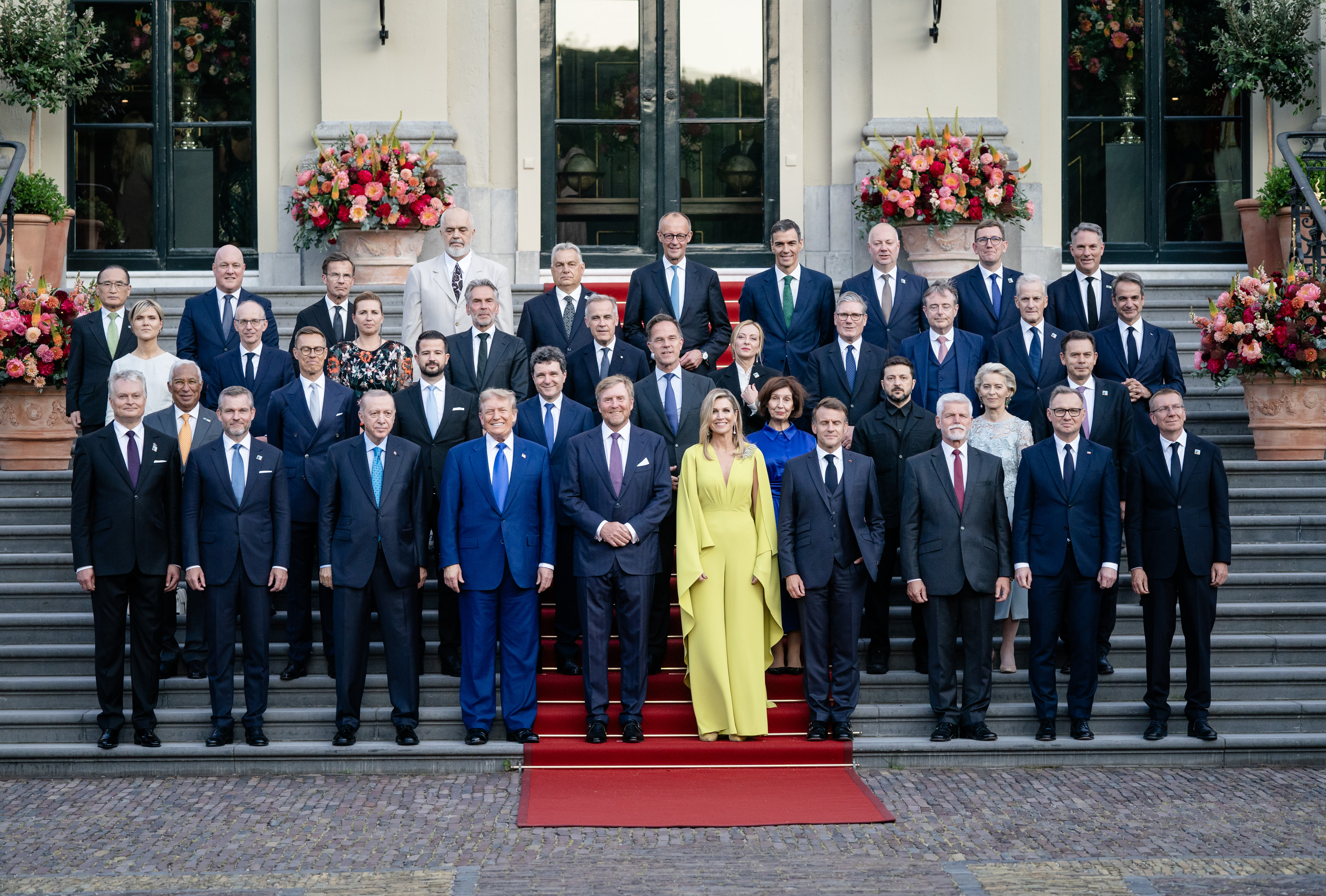
Official photo with guests of the Summit during the dinner at palace Huis ten Bosch

The summit's primary agenda centered on increasing defense expenditures and strengthening NATO's deterrence and defense posture. A major goal was the approval of a new defense investment framework establishing a target for member states to allocate 5% of their gross domestic product to defense by 2035. Under the plan, 3.5% is designated for core military capabilities, while 1.5% is directed toward broader defense-related sectors, including infrastructure and cyber defense. The initiative represents a substantial rise from the 2% GDP benchmark adopted in 2014 and reflects growing security concerns stemming from Russia's continued military actions in Ukraine, as well as broader threats such as terrorism and hybrid warfare.

The program included a meeting of the NATO–Ukraine Council to coordinate future support efforts. However, the agenda did not include commitments regarding Ukraine's potential NATO membership, a decision aimed at preserving alliance cohesion amid differing views, particularly in light of U.S. President Donald Trump's ambivalent stance on the issue.

A Defense Industry Forum on June 24 brought together political leaders, military officials, and industry executives from NATO countries and Indo-Pacific partners (e.g., Australia, Japan, South Korea, New Zealand). The agenda included advancing multinational capability cooperation to boost defense production, streamline procurement, and enhance interoperability among allies.

A key agenda item concerned reaffirming United States commitment to NATO, particularly in light of President Donald Trump's earlier expressions of skepticism regarding the alliance. Secretary General Mark Rutte placed emphasis on direct consultations with Trump in order to secure U.S. backing for the proposed 5% GDP defense spending target. The program for the June 25 session was deliberately condensed to approximately two and a half hours, enabling the alliance to concentrate on major decisions while reducing the likelihood of procedural or political disruptions.

The 2025 Hague NATO Summit's agenda was a strategic blend of immediate priorities (Ukraine support, U.S. engagement) and long-term goals (higher defense spending, industrial cooperation), positioning NATO to address both current and emerging security challenges.

The agenda of the summit was chronologically as follows;

=== Monday 23 June ===
- NATO Secretary General meets with the Prime Minister of the Netherlands
- Pre-Summit press conference by the Secretary General

=== Tuesday 24 June ===
- Secretary General's address at the NATO Public Forum
- NATO Secretary General meets the Prime Minister of Albania
- Signing ceremony at the NATO Summit Defence Industry Forum
- Short remarks by the Secretary General and the President of Ukraine
- Plenary session of the NATO Summit Defence Industry Forum
- Meeting between the Secretary General, the European Union and Ukraine
- Short remarks by the Secretary General and the Prime Minister of New Zealand
- Short remarks by the Secretary General and the Foreign Minister of Japan
- Arrivals of Heads of State and Government and their spouses at the Palace Huis ten Bosch
  - See also; Personal diplomacy towards Donald Trump
- North Atlantic Council Working Dinner in Defence Ministers' session
- NATO-Ukraine Council Working Dinner in Foreign Ministers' session

=== Wednesday 25 June ===
- NATO Secretary General's Doorstep - opening remarks
- Short remarks by the Secretary General and the President of the United States of America
- Welcome Ceremony and Official Photo
- Meeting of the North Atlantic Council at the level of Heads of State and Government; issuing the closing declaration ('The Hague Summit Declaration').
- Secretary General's Press Conference
- Meeting between the Secretary General and Indo-Pacific Partners - New Zealand, Australia, Japan and the Republic of Korea; issuing the NATO-Indo-Pacific statement
- Meeting between the Secretary General, the President of Ukraine and leaders of E5 countries (France, Germany, Italy, Poland and United Kingdom)

== Summit ==
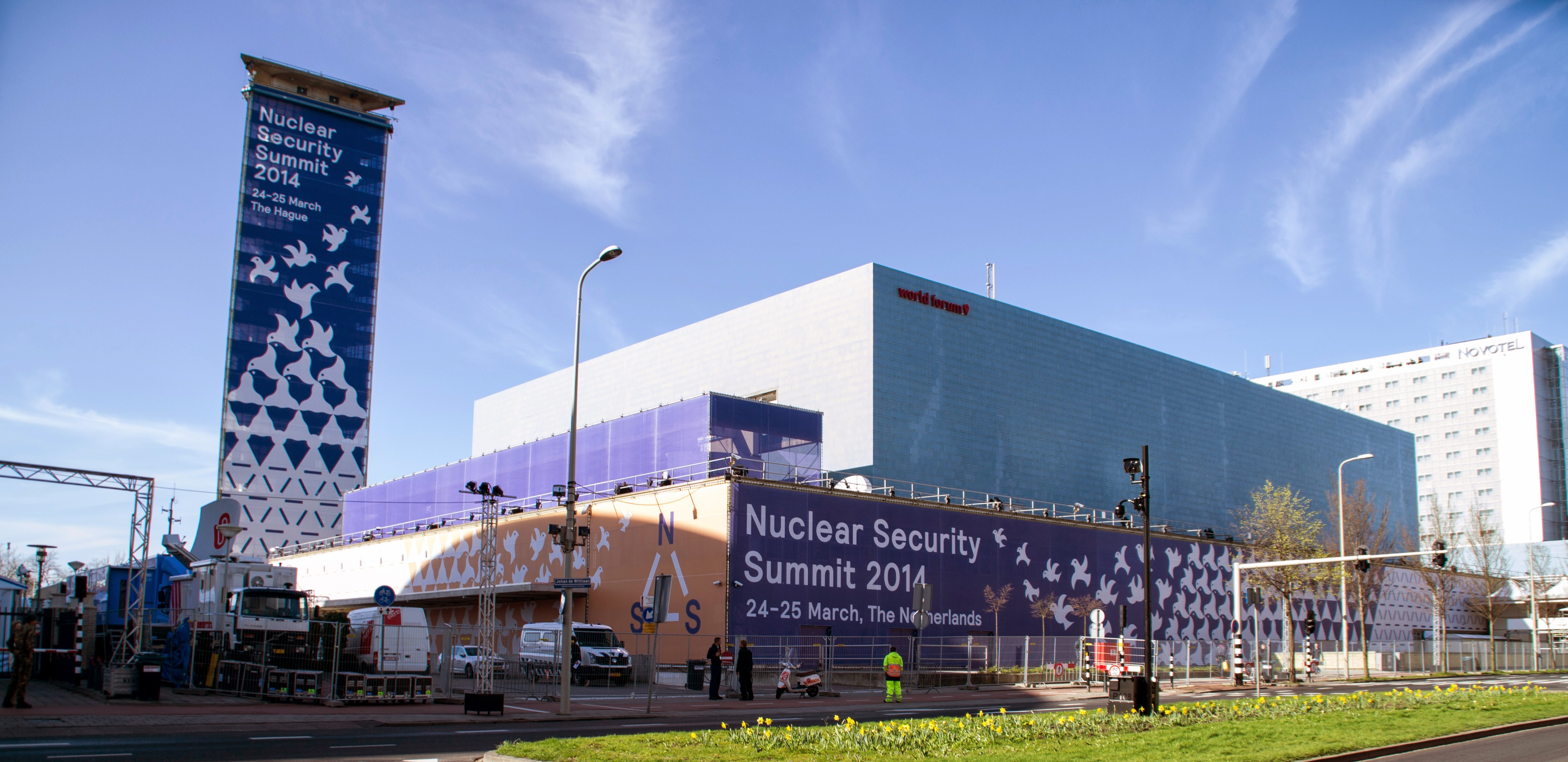
The World Forum in The Hague during the 2014 Nuclear Security Summit

The 2025 NATO summit in The Hague concluded successfully and primarily addressed increasing NATO members' annual defense spending to a new 5% spending target. In his first speech as NATO Secretary General, Mark Rutte urged the alliance to "shift to a wartime mindset and turbocharge our defense production and defense spending." The new 5% spending target was split into two parts: 3.5% must be allocated to direct military expenses such as salaries, weapons, and ammunition, while the remaining 1.5% can be spent on defense-related activities, though what qualifies in this category remained undefined during the summit. Russia was again identified as a long-term threat to the alliance, and all members reaffirmed their commitment to Article 5, the principle that an attack on one is an attack on all. The summit also confirmed continued support for Ukraine in its war against Russia.

Turkish President Recep Tayyip Erdoğan called for a ceasefire in the Gaza war and welcomed the ceasefire in the Twelve-Day War "achieved through the efforts of U.S. President Trump." NATO General Secretary Mark Rutte voiced support for US strikes on Iranian nuclear sites.

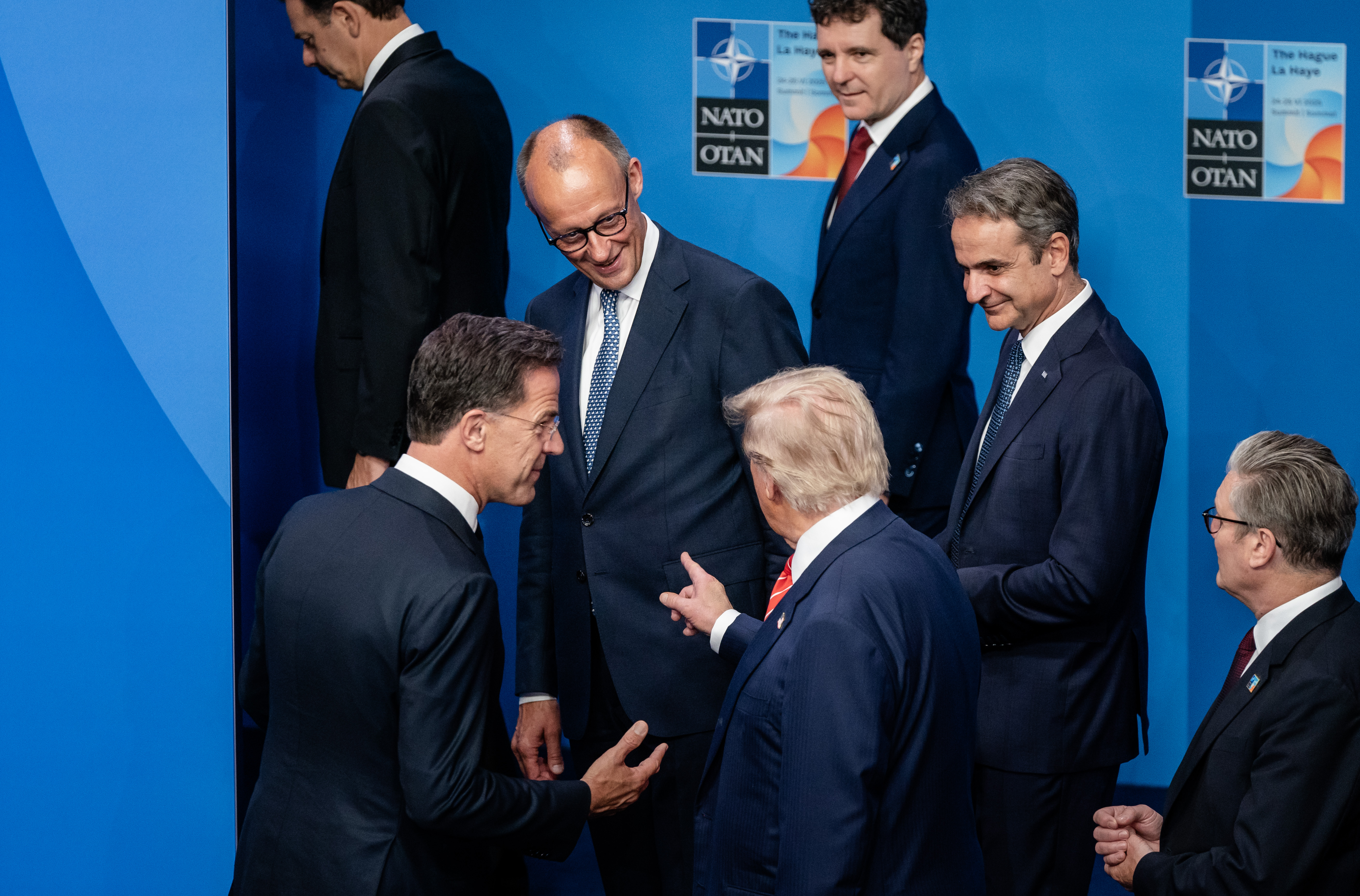
U.S. President Donald Trump speaking with German Chancellor Friedrich Merz

The summit proceedings went smoothly, and U.S. President Trump was reportedly in good spirits, expressing satisfaction with the agreement, which fulfilled his long-standing demand for greater European defense contributions. Spain initially opposed the five percent target, calling it excessive, and was granted an exemption, with promises to raise its contribution to 2.1% eventually. The division of the five percent into two categories was a strategy proposed by Rutte to secure broader support. Despite some earlier ambiguity from Trump regarding his commitment to Article 5, the final declaration firmly reaffirmed NATO's collective defense guarantee.

With member states signing a final agreement, it marked a major diplomatic win for NATO Secretary General Mark Rutte and renewed strength of the alliance. Former Dutch Foreign Minister Ben Bot argued that Rutte's pragmatic, carefully planned approach was effective in keeping Trump committed to NATO and increasing support for Ukraine.

The outcomes of the summit were documented in the closing declaration ('The Hague Summit Declaration').

== Closing declaration ==
The summit was concluded with 'The Hague Summit Declaration' - which included the following points:

1. Member States confirm 'ironclad commitment' to Article 5;
2. All member states except Spain agree to a new 5% defence spending target noting Russia and terrorism as long-term threats to the alliance;
3. The new 5% commitment will be split into 3.5% on 'core defence' and 1.5% on defence related costs - of which any support to Ukraine will be counted because Ukraine's security contributes to the security of the alliance - and check progress in 2029;
4. Member states will work to eliminate defence trade barriers;
5. The next NATO summit will be held in Turkey and the one after in Albania.

The full text of The Hague Summit Declaration is

1. We, the Heads of State and Government of the North Atlantic Alliance, have gathered in The Hague to reaffirm our commitment to NATO, the strongest Alliance in history, and to the transatlantic bond. We reaffirm our ironclad commitment to collective defence as enshrined in Article 5 of the Washington Treaty – that an attack on one is an attack on all. We remain united and steadfast in our resolve to protect our one billion citizens, defend the Alliance, and safeguard our freedom and democracy.
2. United in the face of profound security threats and challenges, in particular the long- term threat posed by Russia to Euro-Atlantic security and the persistent threat of terrorism, Allies commit to invest 5% of GDP annually on core defence requirements as well as defence-and security-related spending by 2035 to ensure our individual and collective obligations, in accordance with Article 3 of the Washington Treaty. Our investments will ensure we have the forces, capabilities, resources, infrastructure, warfighting readiness, and resilience needed to deter and defend in line with our three core tasks of deterrence and defence, crisis prevention and management, and cooperative security.
3. Allies agree that this 5% commitment will comprise two essential categories of defence investment. Allies will allocate at least 3.5% of GDP annually based on the agreed definition of NATO defence expenditure by 2035 to resource core defence requirements, and to meet the NATO Capability Targets. Allies agree to submit annual plans showing a credible, incremental path to reach this goal. And Allies will account for up to 1.5% of GDP annually to inter alia protect our critical infrastructure, defend our networks, ensure our civil preparedness and resilience, unleash innovation, and strengthen our defence industrial base. The trajectory and balance of spending under this plan will be reviewed in 2029, in light of the strategic environment and updated Capability Targets. Allies reaffirm their enduring sovereign commitments to provide support to Ukraine, whose security contributes to ours, and, to this end, will include direct contributions towards Ukraine's defence and its defence industry when calculating Allies' defence spending.
4. We reaffirm our shared commitment to rapidly expand transatlantic defence industrial cooperation and to harness emerging technology and the spirit of innovation to advance our collective security. We will work to eliminate defence trade barriers among Allies and will leverage our partnerships to promote defence industrial cooperation.
5. We express our appreciation for the generous hospitality extended to us by the Kingdom of the Netherlands. We look forward to our next meeting in Türkiye in 2026 followed by a meeting in Albania.

== Security measures ==
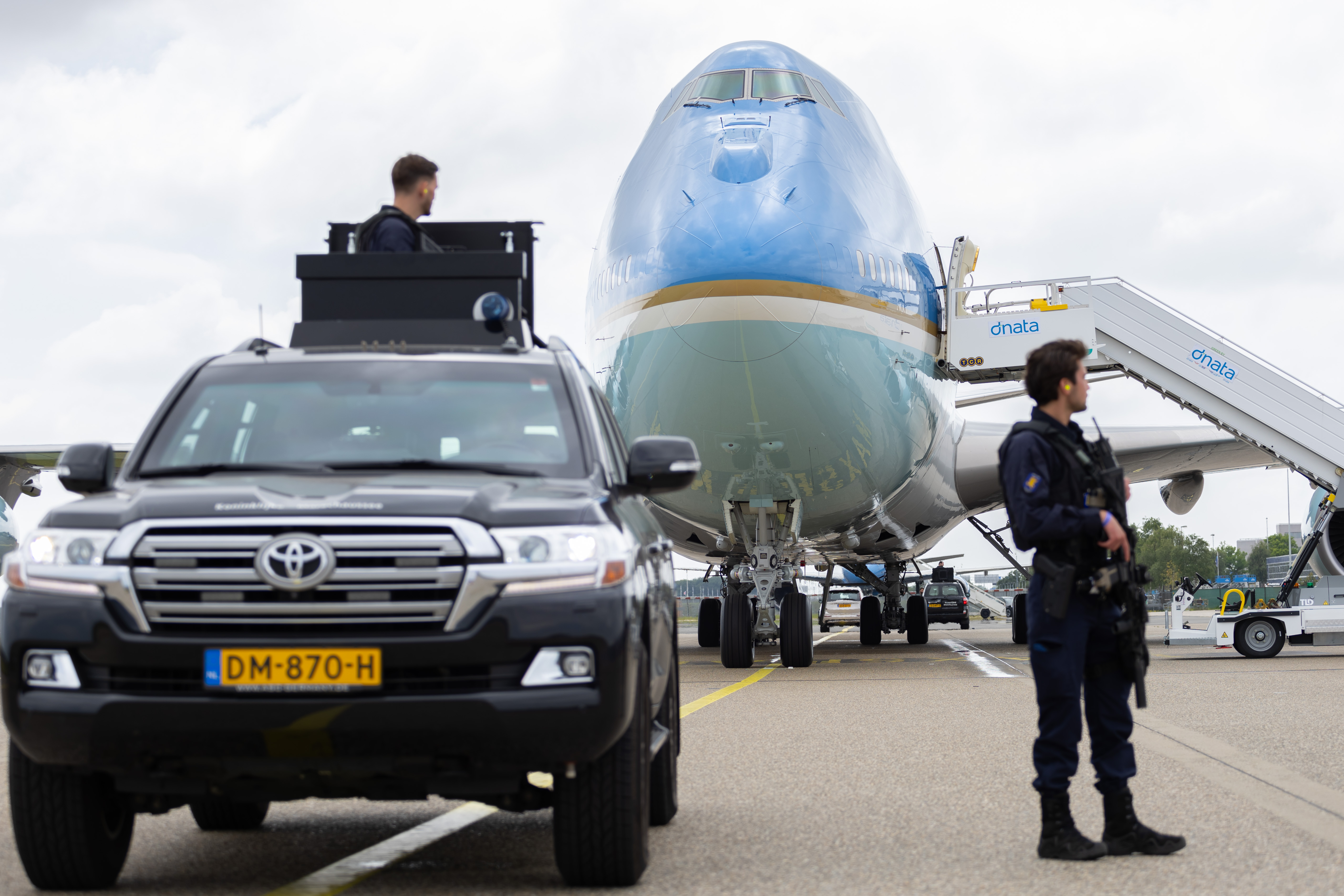
Royal Marechaussee protecting Air Force One

The event was a massive logistical undertaking, described as the largest security operation in Dutch history. Approximately 9,000 attendees, including some 45 heads of state or government, 6,000 delegates, and 2,000 journalists, descended on The Hague.

The Netherlands Ministry of Defense launched operation Orange Shield that consisted with large-scale deployments of police, military personnel, and specialized units. Part of the operation also consisted enhanced sea patrols near coastal areas to prevent maritime threats. Aerial surveillance involved the deployment of combat aircraft (F-35), combat helicopters and drones for airspace monitoring.

The Hague has implemented robust measures, including drone surveillance, roadblocks, and heightened policing to protect attendees amid anticipated protests. Parts of The Hague, particularly around the World Forum (main summit venue), have been closed off with roadblocks and restricted access.

The Dutch National Police announced plans to deploy 27,000 personnel – nearly half its total workforce – for what would be the largest security operation in its history. Resources would be concentrated around The Hague, Amsterdam Airport Schiphol, and the connecting route.

== Local event impacts ==
The Johan de Wittlaan, along which the World Forum is located, would be closed off for four months. Due to capacity issues, temporary structures were erected on the street, for which trees and traffic lights were removed. The exterior of the World Forum was repainted, and the seats and lighting in the main auditorium were replaced.

It was estimated by Minister of Foreign Affairs Hanke Bruins Slot that the event would attract 8,500 attendants, of whom 6,000 delegation members, and would cost €95 million. Most of that amount would be covered by the national government, with €1.25 million to be paid by the municipality of The Hague.

The police discouraged organizing other events in the Netherlands during the first half of 2025, with the Veenendaal-Veenendaal cycling race cancelled as a result – however the Amstel Gold Race (the biggest Dutch road cycling race) will take place following negotiations between the police and the Royal Dutch Cycling Union. Other events cancelled owing to the summit include the Veterans' Day parade.

The summit sparked protests in The Hague against increased military spending and geopolitical issues, including Israel's war in the Gaza Strip, and the Israeli-Iranian conflict following Trump's strikes on Iranian nuclear sites. The Dutch government promoted public engagement through initiatives like the "Road to Summit" program, which included educational events and a traveling exhibition, "NATO and the Netherlands: A Journey," to highlight the alliance's role in global security.

== Participants ==
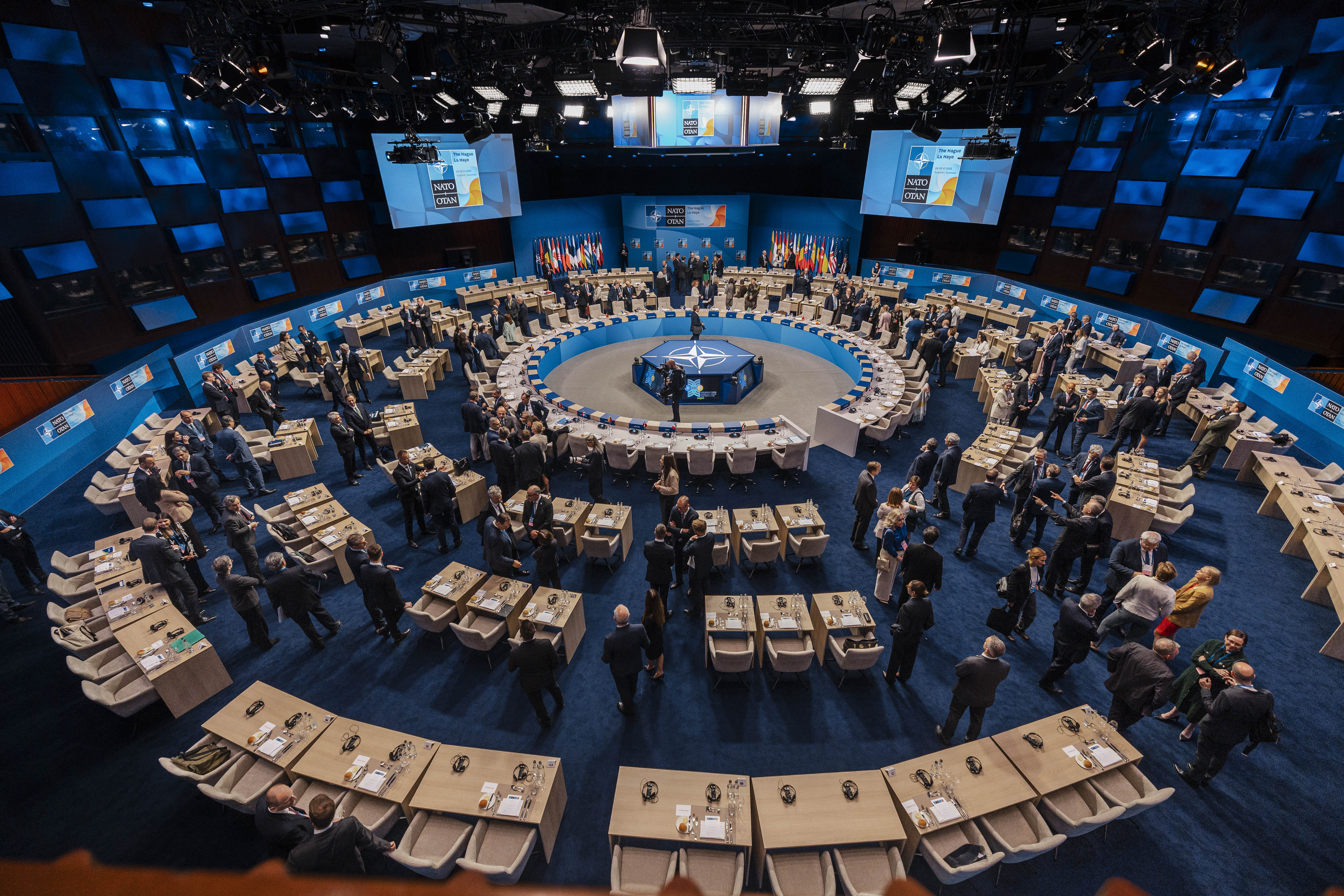
Working session of the leaders in the facilities of World Forum in The Hague.

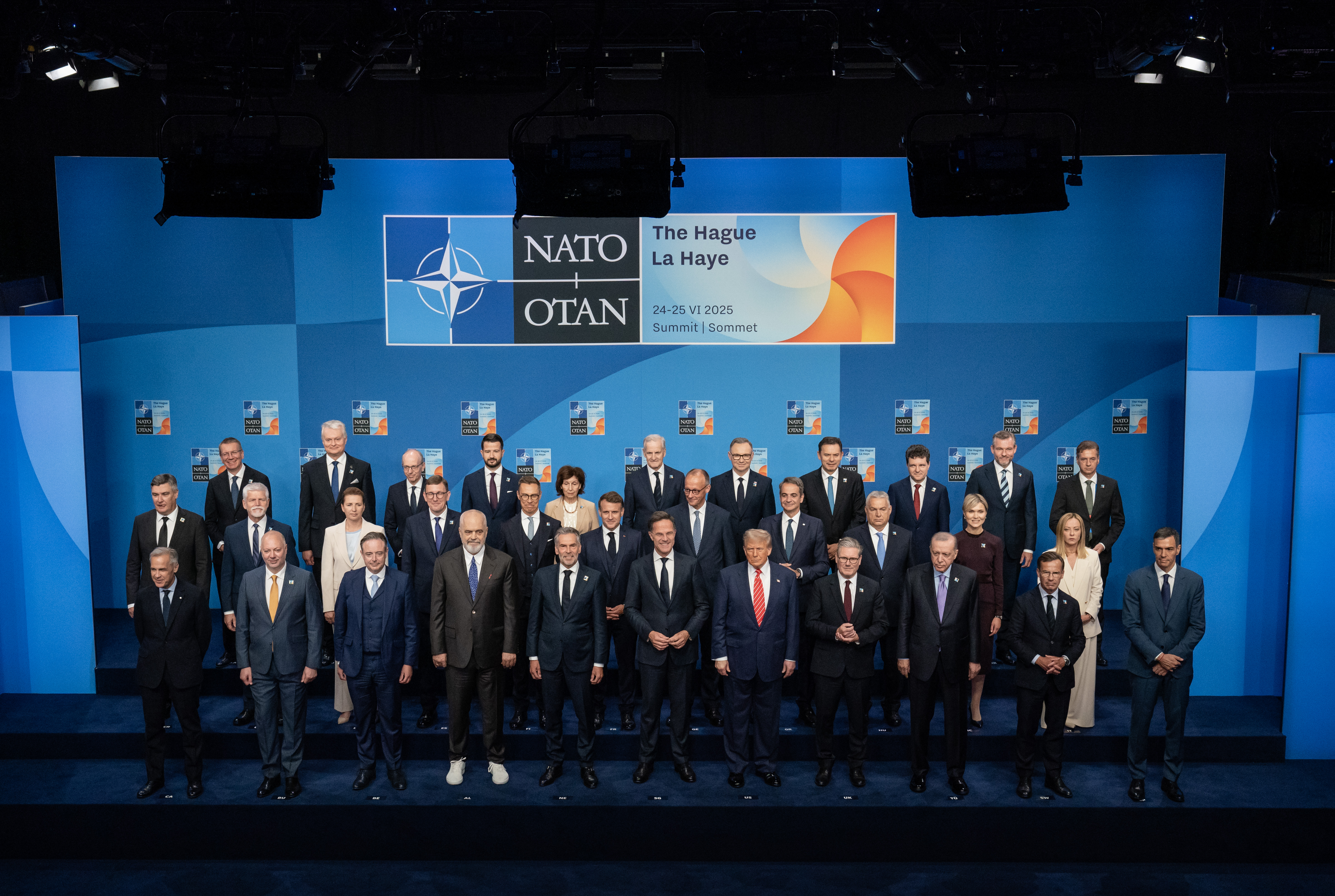
Family photo of the 2025 The Hague summit

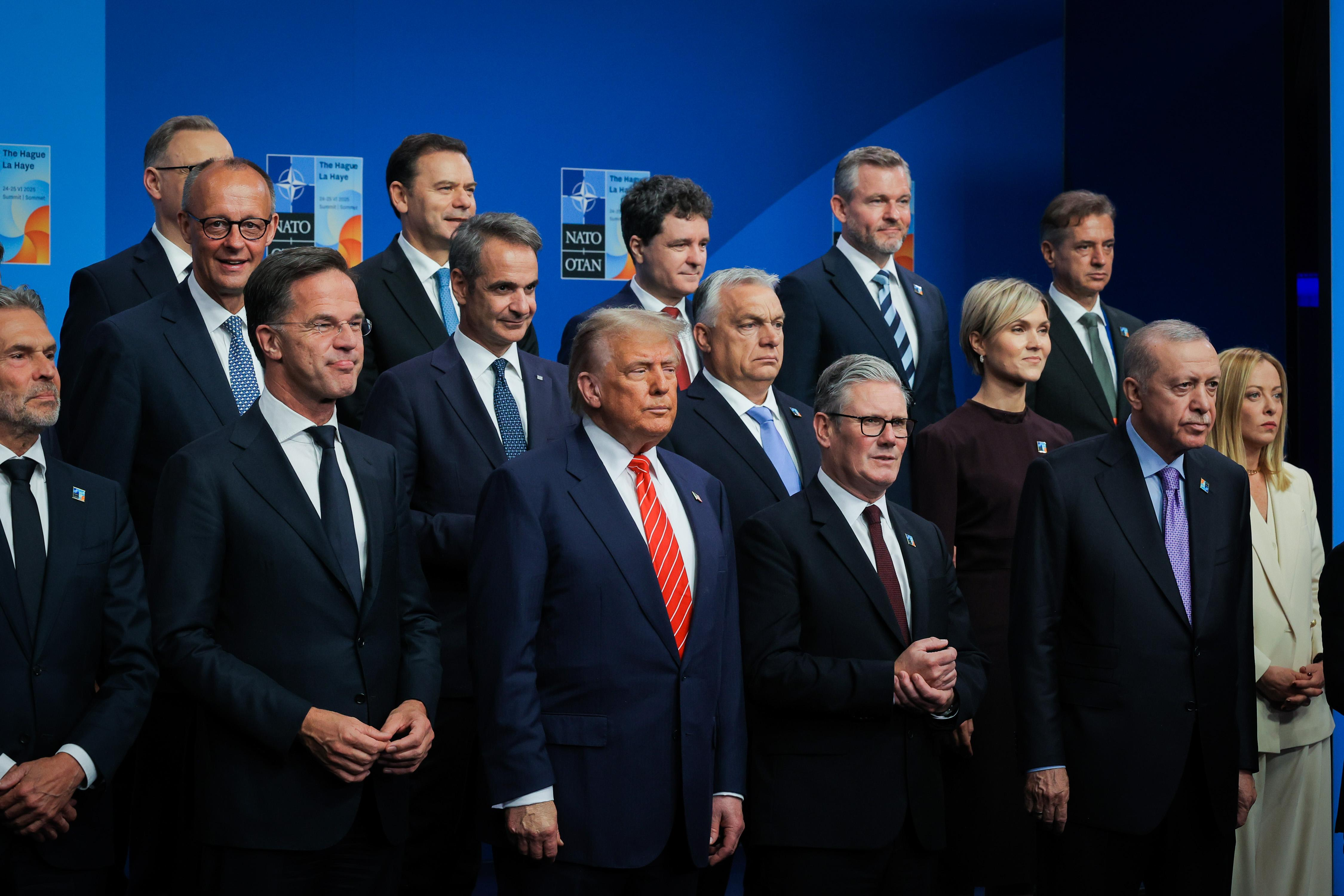
Family photo of leaders at the summit

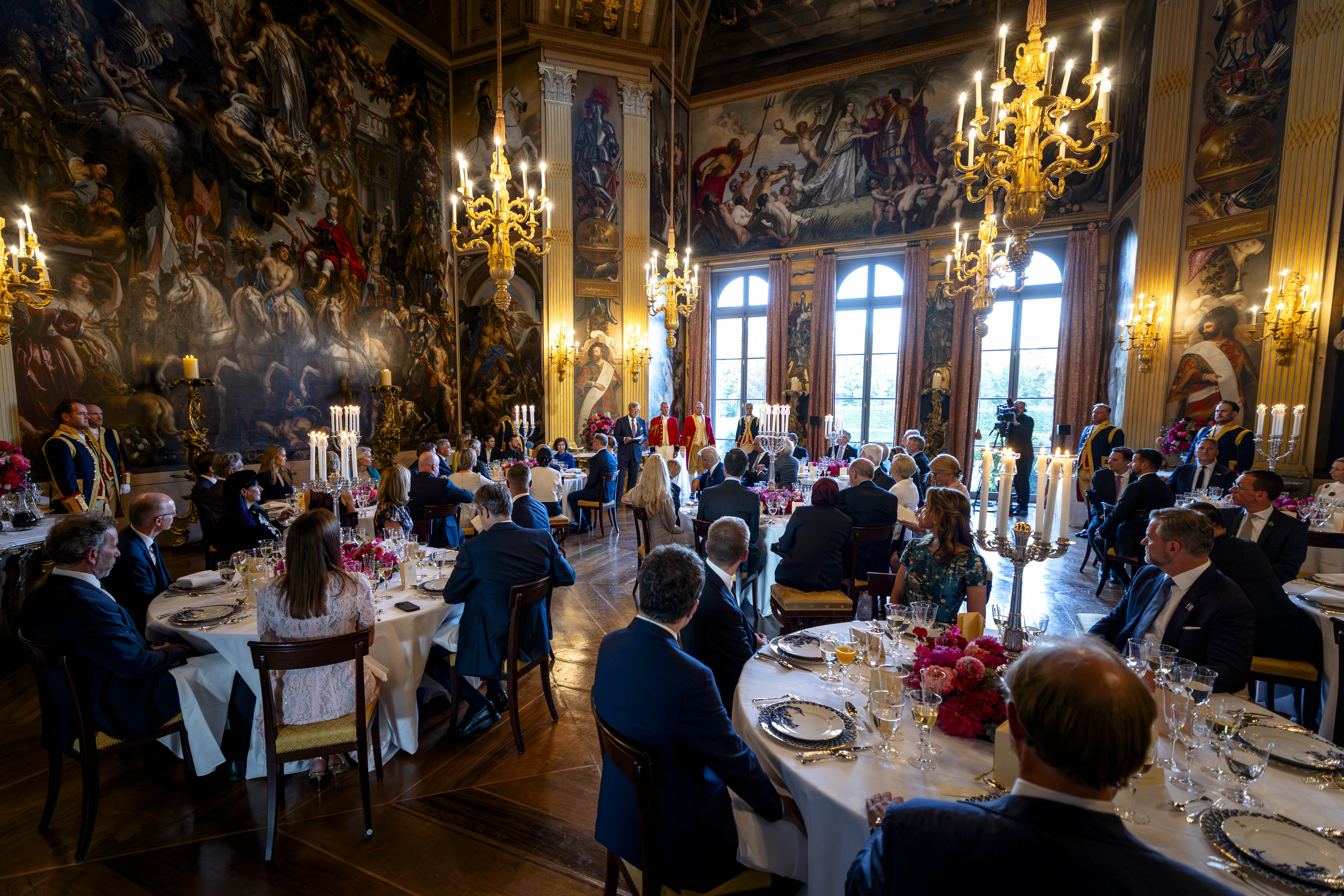
NATO Summit 2025, dinner

Country or organization	Head of Delegation	Title	Ref.
NATO	Mark Rutte	Secretary General	
Albania	Edi Rama	Prime Minister	
Belgium	Bart De Wever	Prime Minister	
Bulgaria	Rosen Zhelyazkov	Prime Minister	
Canada	Mark Carney	Prime Minister	
Croatia	Zoran Milanović	President	
Czech Republic	Petr Pavel	President	
Denmark	Mette Frederiksen	Prime Minister	
Estonia	Kristen Michal	Prime Minister	
Finland	Alexander Stubb	President	
France	Emmanuel Macron	President	
Germany	Friedrich Merz	Chancellor	
Greece	Kyriakos Mitsotakis	Prime Minister	
Hungary	Viktor Orbán	Prime Minister	
Iceland	Kristrún Frostadóttir	Prime Minister	
Italy	Giorgia Meloni	Prime Minister	
Latvia	Edgars Rinkēvičs	President	
Lithuania	Gitanas Nausėda	President	
Luxembourg	Luc Frieden	Prime Minister	
Montenegro	Jakov Milatović	President	
Netherlands	Dick Schoof (host)	Prime Minister	
North Macedonia	Gordana Siljanovska-Davkova	President	
Norway	Jonas Gahr Støre	Prime Minister	
Poland	Andrzej Duda	President	
Portugal	Luís Montenegro	Prime Minister	
Romania	Nicușor Dan	President	
Slovakia	Peter Pellegrini	President	
Slovenia	Robert Golob	Prime Minister	
Spain	Pedro Sanchez	Prime Minister	
Sweden	Ulf Kristersson	Prime Minister	
Turkey	Recep Tayyip Erdoğan	President	
United Kingdom	Keir Starmer	Prime Minister	
United States	Donald Trump	President	

=== Invited non-NATO members ===
Country or organization	Invitee	Title	Attendance	Ref.
Australia	Anthony Albanese	Prime Minister	Absent	
European Union	António Costa	President of the European Council	Present	
European Union	Ursula von der Leyen	President of the European Commission	Present	
Japan	Shigeru Ishiba	Prime Minister	Absent	
New Zealand	Christopher Luxon	Prime Minister	Present	
South Korea	Lee Jae-myung	President	Absent	
Ukraine	Volodymyr Zelenskyy (Note: for 24 June official dinner only)	President	Present	

== United Kingdom ==
Starmer pledged to boost overall UK defence and security spending to 5% of economic output by 2035 to meet a NATO target. Keir Starmer has announced that the UK will send 350 advanced air defence missiles to Ukraine, funded for the first time by £70m in interest from frozen Russian assets, with the missiles rapidly adapted for ground launch and delivered via UK-supplied Raven systems. Additionally, he announced the UK's decision to purchase 12 F-35A jets which are expected to carry US atomic bombs—expanding UK nuclear capability to include airborne delivery systems.

== Personal diplomacy towards President Donald Trump ==
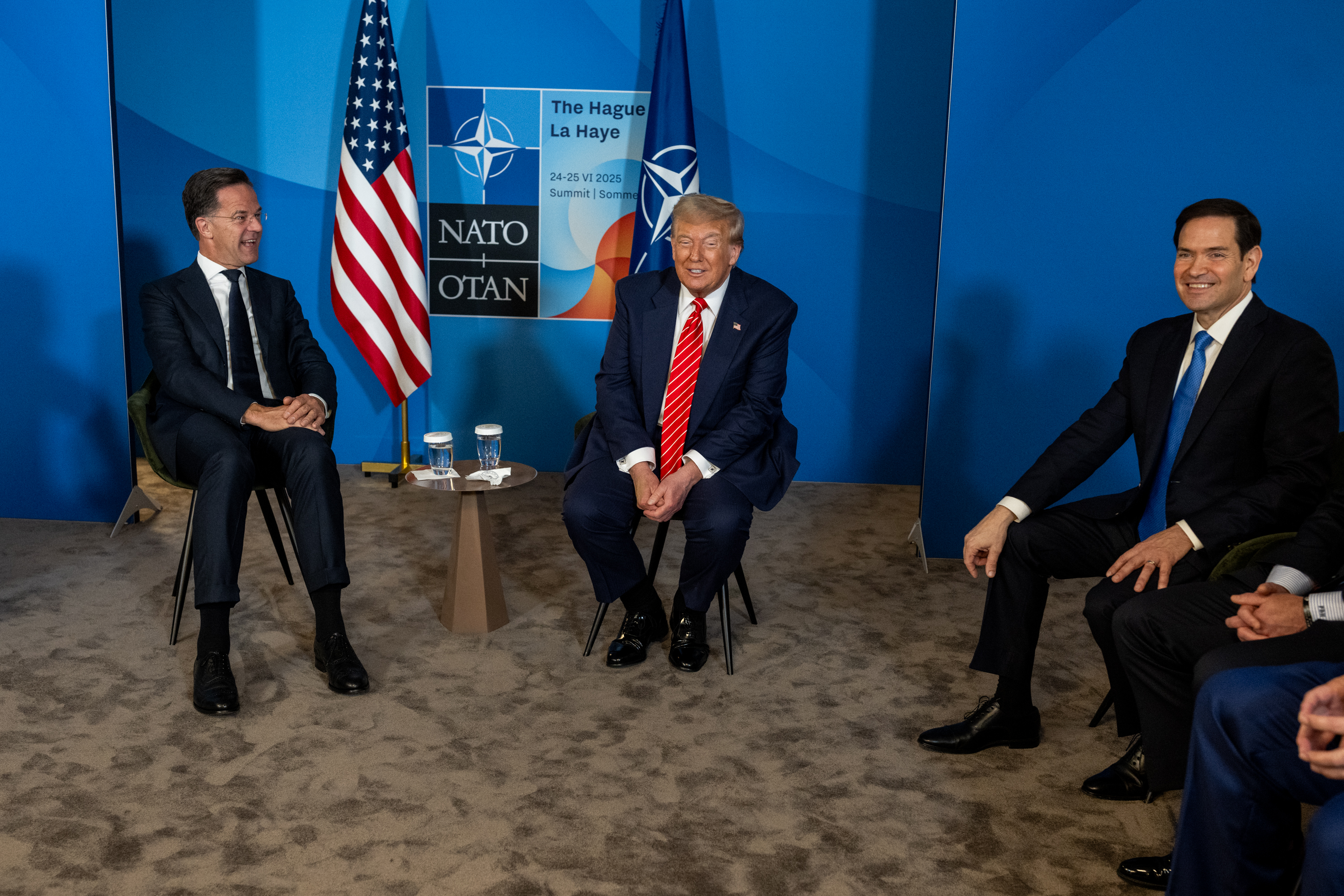
President Donald Trump with NATO General Secretary Mark Rutte and Secretary of State Marco Rubio

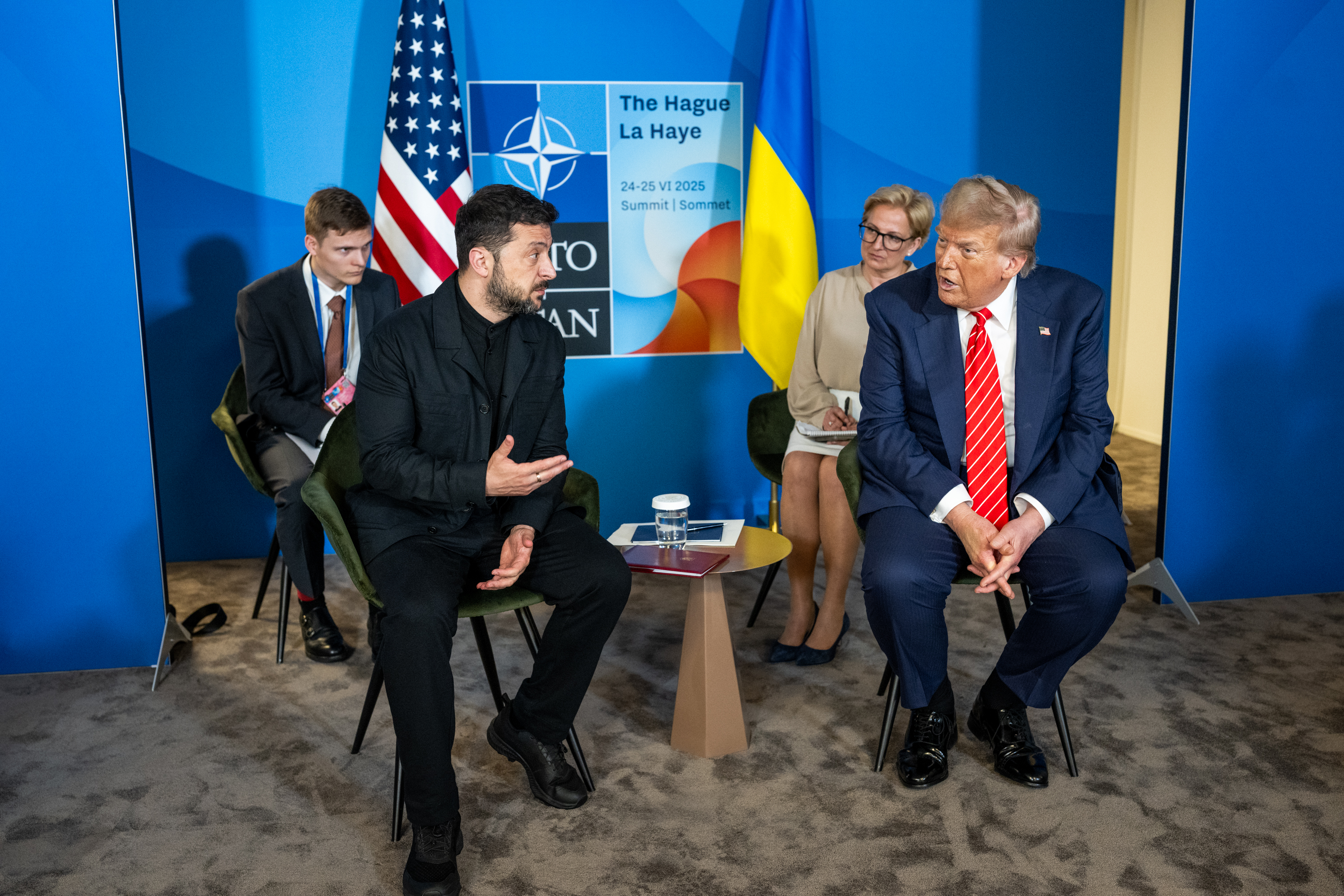
Donald Trump with Ukrainian president Volodymyr Zelenskyy

Prior to the summit, US President Donald Trump had criticized the alliance on numerous occasions, generally aimed at the lack of investment from the other members. The summit was viewed as a crucial diplomatic event for Dutch diplomats to sway the US president to a more favorable viewpoint.

The pre-summit dinner opened with a speech from His Majesty King Willem-Alexander who invited Trump to spend the night at the palace as his personal guest, the first time such an invitation was issued to a non-royal foreign dignitary.

In the approach to the summit Donald Trump shared an unprecedented intimate look into the personal communications between himself and NATO Secretary Mark Rutte by sharing private messages on his Truth Social account. Some speculated that Rutte may have intentionally crafted the text knowing Trump would likely publicize it, using Trump's communication style to NATO's advantage, even if such gestures seem excessive by Dutch standards. Ultimately, many agreed that it was a calculated gamble that paid off.

During the summit Dutch and American diplomats worked together to ensure agreement on the 5% of GDP spending goal was adopted without issue despite giving an exemption to Spain. In remarks to the media, president Trump referenced the close relation with Mark Rutte saying "I came here because it was something I'm supposed to be doing, but I left here a little bit differently. [..] I watched the heads of these countries get up and the love and the passion that they showed for their country was unbelievable. I've never seen quite anything like it. They want to protect their country and they need the United States and without the United States, it's not going to be the same." Although some media sources referred to the Dutch strategy as 'flattery' they also acknowledged that the Dutch approach was successful.

After talks with Ukrainian president Volodymyr Zelenskyy at the NATO summit in The Hague, Trump said he was considering sending more Patriot missile batteries to Ukraine to protect Kyiv from Russian attacks.

== See also ==
- NATO summit
- 2024 Washington NATO summit
- Netherlands–United States relations
- Agreement on 5% NATO Defence Spending by 2035
- Spain–NATO 5% Military Spending Conflict
