= Bucharest Nine =

Diplomatic organization of Central and Eastern European countries

Bucharest Nine Bucharest Format
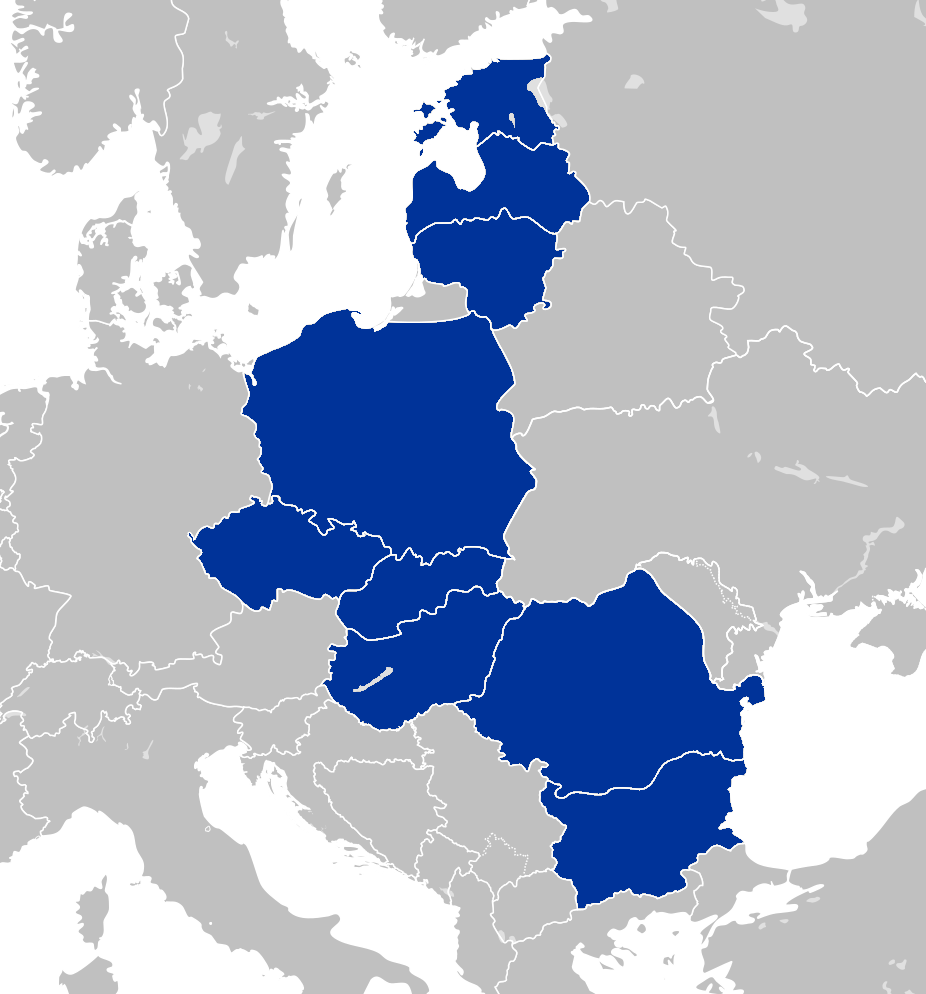
- Members of the Bucharest Nine
- Membership: Bulgaria; Czech Republic; Estonia; Hungary; Latvia; Lithuania; Poland; Romania; Slovakia
- Establishment: 4 November 2015

Area
  - Total: 1,058,112 km^{2} (408,539 sq mi)

Population
  - 2026 estimate: 94,840,728
  - Density: 89.6/km^{2} (232.1/sq mi)
- GDP (PPP): 2026 estimate
  - Total: ▲$5.173 trillion (9th)
  - Per capita: ▲$54,546
- GDP (nominal): 2026 estimate
  - Total: ▲$2.821 trillion (9th)
  - Per capita: ▲$29,753

The Bucharest Nine or the Bucharest Format (B9 or B-9; Romanian: Formatul București, Polish: Bukaresztańska Dziewiątka), or NATO's Eastern Flank (ambiguous as of 2025) is an organization founded on 4 November 2015 in Bucharest, Romania, at the initiative of the president of Romania Klaus Iohannis and the president of Poland Andrzej Duda during a bilateral meeting between them. Its members are Bulgaria, the Czech Republic, Estonia, Hungary, Latvia, Lithuania, Poland, Romania and Slovakia. Due to its separate history, Finland is not a member despite its location and its NATO membership since 2023.

Its appearance was mainly a result of perceived aggressive attitude from Russia following the annexation of Crimea from Ukraine and its posterior intervention in eastern Ukraine both in 2014. All members of the B9 were either part of the former Soviet Union (USSR) or members of the defunct Soviet-led Warsaw Pact. All members are also members of NATO and members of EU.

== History ==
Since its foundation on 4 November 2015, the Bucharest Nine countries have held several meetings at various levels. A tabular list follows the historical development.

In June 2018, prior to the B9 meeting that year, President of Poland Andrzej Duda spoke out in favour of Ukrainian and Georgian NATO membership ambitions.

On 10 May 2021, during a B9 video conference summit which the president of the United States Joe Biden joined, President of Romania Klaus Iohannis (one of the two hosts of the summit, the other being Duda) called for "stronger allied military presence [...] on the bloc's eastern flank" following the mobilization of Russian troops near the Russian border with Ukraine which had happened some time before.

On 25 February 2022, the B9 group with the addition of Ursula von der Leyen, President of the European Commission, gathered in light of the 2022 Russian invasion of Ukraine.

The 10 June 2022 B9 summit was attended virtually by the secretary general of NATO, Jens Stoltenberg, as well as the presidents of the Czech Republic and Slovakia. On it, Duda declared "We want the enhanced forward presence that we have today on NATO's eastern flank to be extended. We want the existing battalion groups to be transformed into brigade groups." Duda added that a brigade group has 3,000 troops, which would mean a "significant and visible strengthening", while Iohannis said that "NATO must be capable to defend every inch of its territory". Iohannis added that the B9 summit agreed in favour of admitting Finland and Sweden into NATO and told participants of the meeting that "security risks to Romania and the Black Sea region are increasing", and in the press release it was written that the meeting was in order to prepare for the most important decisions of NATO's 2022 Madrid summit. Furthermore, the president of Estonia Alar Karis stated during the meeting that all nine members agree that Russia is a threat to NATO.

On 11 October 2022, the B9 presidents, along with the presidents of North Macedonia and Montenegro, condemned and demanded the end of that month's series of Russian missile strikes on Ukrainian civilian targets and described them as war crimes to be punished under international law.

At a summit on 22 February 2023, the heads of state of the Bucharest Nine countries, as well as Biden and Stoltenberg, signed a declaration which issued a condemnation of the Russian invasion of Ukraine and called for an enhanced military presence of NATO on the eastern flank of the alliance.

On 2 June 2025, leaders of the Bucharest Nine and Nordic countries pledged to work toward gradually increasing defence spending to at least 5% of their gross domestic product in response to mounting security threats, particularly from Russia. The commitment was made in a joint statement issued following a summit in Vilnius, co-chaired by Lithuanian president Gitanas Nausėda, Polish president Andrzej Duda, and Romanian president Nicușor Dan. The international meeting was also attended by NATO secretary general Mark Rutte and Ukrainian president Volodymyr Zelenskyy.

== Summits ==
=== Summits of heads of state ===
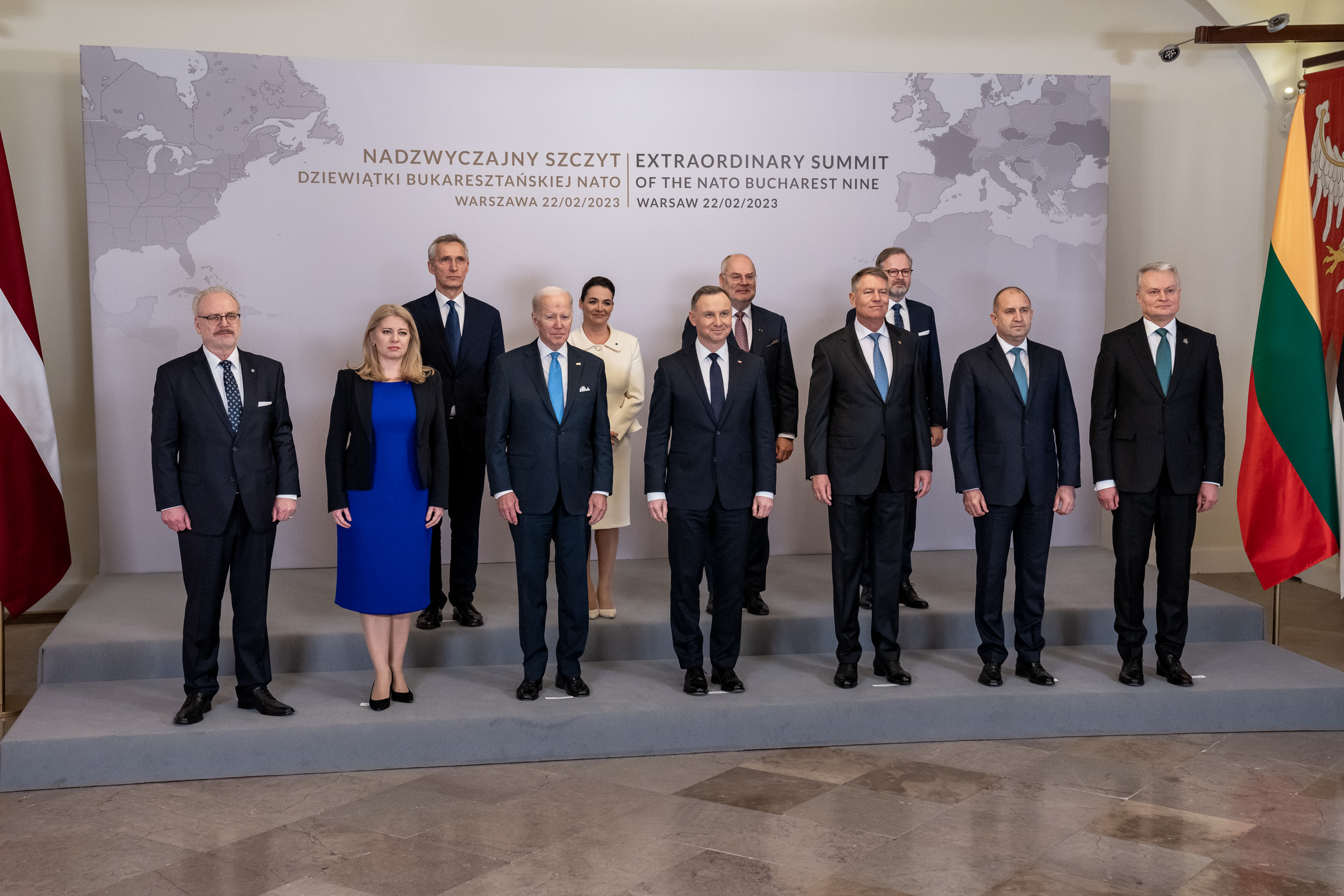
Bucharest Nine summit of heads of state in Warsaw, Poland, on 22 February 2023

B9 summits of heads of state
Year	Date	Country	City	Host leader	Ref.
2015	4 November	Romania	Bucharest	Klaus Iohannis	
2018	8 June	Poland	Warsaw	Andrzej Duda	
2019	28 February	Slovakia	Košice	Andrej Kiska	
2021	10 May	Romania	Bucharest	Klaus Iohannis and Andrzej Duda	
2022	25 February	Poland	Warsaw	Andrzej Duda	
2022	10 June	Romania	Bucharest	Klaus Iohannis and Andrzej Duda	
2023	22 February	Poland	Warsaw	Andrzej Duda, Klaus Iohannis and Zuzana Čaputová	
2023	6 June	Slovakia	Bratislava	Zuzana Čaputová, Andrzej Duda and Klaus Iohannis	
2024	11 June	Latvia	Riga	Edgars Rinkēvičs	
2025	2 June	Lithuania	Vilnius	Gitanas Nausėda, Nicușor Dan and Andrzej Duda	
2026	13 May	Romania	Bucharest	Nicușor Dan and Karol Nawrocki	

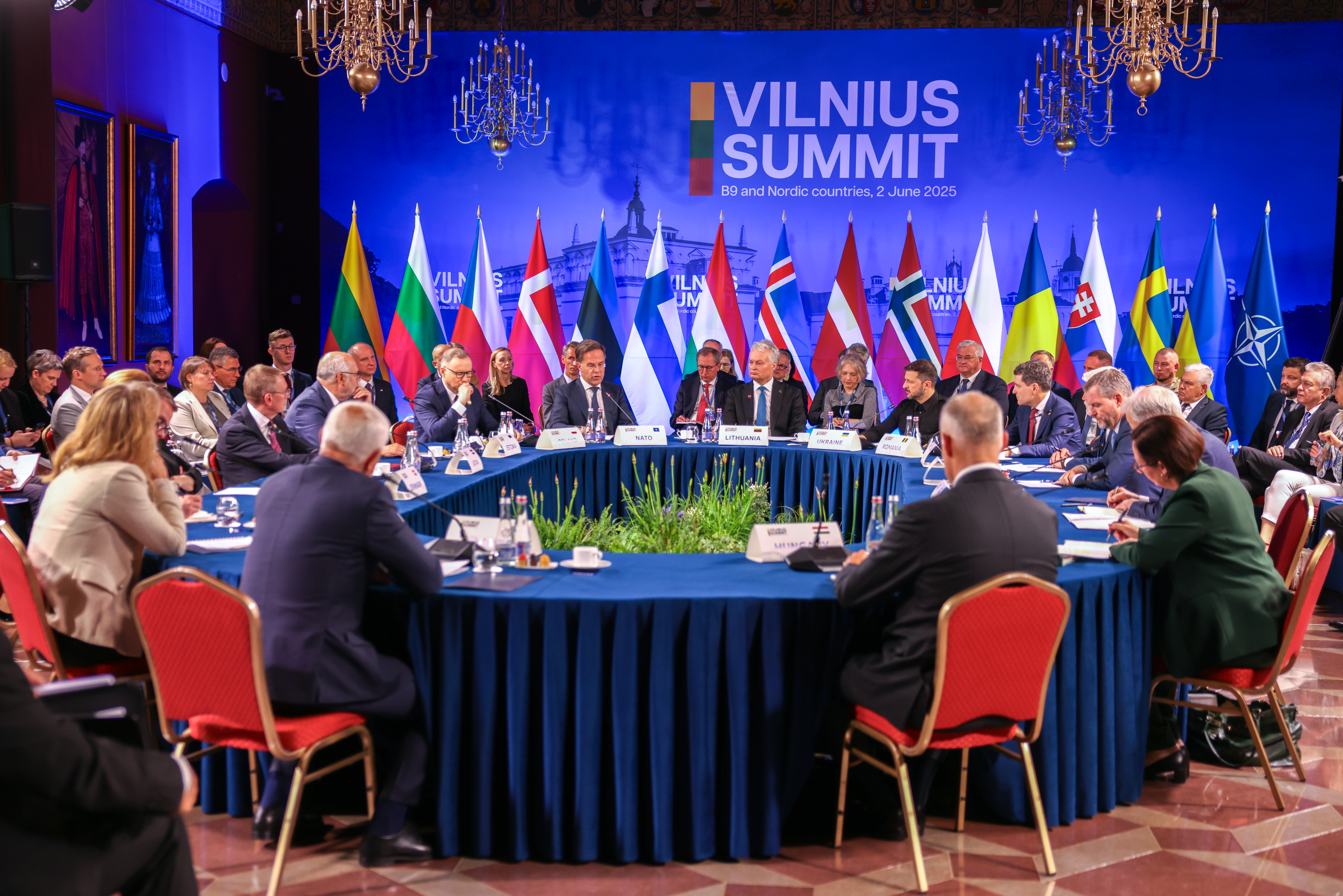
Bucharest Nine reunited in Vilnius, Lithuania, together with the Nordic countries, on 2 June 2025

=== Summits of ministers of foreign affairs ===
B9 meetings of foreign affairs ministers
Year	Date	Country	City	Ref.
2016	8 November	Romania	Bucharest	
2017	9 October	Poland	Warsaw	
2020	10 March	Lithuania	Vilnius	
2021	27 October	Estonia	Tallinn	
2022	31 March	Slovakia	Bratislava	
2023	31 March	Poland	Łódź	
2024	26 May	Belgium	Brussels	

=== Summits of ministers of defence ===
B9 meetings of defence ministers
Year	Date	Country	City	Ref.
2018	12–14 March	Romania	Bucharest	
2019	4 April	Poland	Warsaw	
2021	25 November	Romania	Bucharest	
2022	6 June	Videoconference		
2023	26 April	Poland	Warsaw	
2024	19 September	Romania	Bucharest	

== See also ==
- European Union
- Intermarium
- NATO Enhanced Forward Presence
- Three Seas Initiative
- Visegrád Group
- Nordic-Baltic Eight
