= List of international prime ministerial trips made by Mette Frederiksen =

This is a list of international prime ministerial trips made by Mette Frederiksen, the current Prime Minister of Denmark since 27 June 2019.

== Summary ==
Frederiksen has visited 29 countries during her tenure as prime minister. The number of visits per country where Frederiksen has traveled are:

- One visit to Albania, Azerbaijan, Cyprus, the Czech Republic, Egypt, Greenland, Hungary, India, Ireland, Japan, Latvia, Moldova, Montenegro, Namibia, Romania, Slovenia and Turkey
- Two visits to Iceland, the Netherlands and Spain
- Three visits to Estonia, Lithuania
- Four visits to Norway, Sweden, United States
- Seven visits to Finland
- Eight visits to Ukraine and the United Kingdom
- Nine visits to France
- Eleven visits to Germany
- Eighteen visits to Belgium

=== 2019 ===
Country	Location(s)	Dates	Details
France	Paris	18 November	Met with President Emmanuel Macron for bilateral talks at the Élysée Palace.
United Kingdom	London, Watford	3–4 December	Frederiksen travelled to Watford to attend the 30th NATO summit.

=== 2020 ===
Country	Location(s)	Dates	Details
Belgium	Brussels	1–2 October	Frederiksen attended an extraordinary European Council.

=== 2021 ===
Country	Location(s)	Dates	Details
Belgium	Brussels	13–14 June	Frederiksen travelled to Brussels to attend the 31st NATO summit.
Slovenia	Ljubljana	5–6 October	Frederiksen attended an informal European Council and the EU-Western Balkans summit.
Belgium	Brussels	21–22 October	Frederiksen attended the European Council.
India	New Delhi	9–11 October	State visit
United Kingdom	Glasgow	1–2 November	Frederiksen attended the 2021 United Nations Climate Change Conference

=== 2022 ===
Country	Location(s)	Dates	Details
Germany	Berlin	9 February	Met with German chancellor Olaf Scholz. The meeting will focus on bilateral relations, European policy, and international issues.
Belgium	Brussels	24 February	Frederiksen attended a special meeting of the European Council to discuss the Russian invasion of Ukraine.
France	Versailles	10–11 March	Participation in the informal meeting of EU Heads of State and Government.
Belgium	Brussels	24 March	Frederiksen attended an extraordinary NATO summit.
Estonia	Tallinn	30 March	Met with Prime Minister Kaja Kallas and the Danish soldiers at the military base in Tapa. They discussed strengthening NATO's defense capabilities and finding additional ways to support Ukraine and stop Russia's aggression. Prime Minister Kallas thanked her colleague for Denmark's long-standing commitment to protecting the Baltic region.
Lithuania	Vilnius	30–31 March	Met with President Gitanas Nausėda. They discussed the strengthening of NATO’s eastern flank, cooperation between the countries in the fields of security and defense, economy, and energy independence, as well as measures to respond to Russia's war against Ukraine and assistance to Ukraine. During the meeting, the president thanked her for Denmark's significant contribution to the security of the Baltic region and its readiness to do even more. She announced that Denmark was planning to send an additional 800 troops to the Baltic countries.
Latvia	Riga, Ādaži	31 March	Met with Prime Minister Krišjānis Kariņš to discuss the security situation in the region, and the united response to Russia's unjustified war in Ukraine. She informed about plans for Denmark to deploy extra 800 Danish military troops in Latvia. After their meeting, both visited Ādaži military base. She met with the Danish contingent at MND N to thank them for efforts and commitment to regional stability and security in the Baltic Sea region.
Ukraine	Kyiv, Borodianka	21 April	Together with Spanish prime minister Pedro Sánchez travelled to Kyiv to meet with President Volodymyr Zelenskyy. At the meeting, Frederiksen promised an increase in arms and military aid to Ukraine by 600 million DKK, bringing the total Danish aid to 1 billion DKK.
Netherlands	The Hague	14 June	Met with Prime Minister of Portugal Antonio Costa, NATO Secretary General Jens Stoltenberg, Prime Minister Mark Rutte, Prime Minister of Latvia Krišjānis Kariņš, Prime Minister of Belgium Alexander De Croo and Prime Minister of Poland Mateusz Morawiecki on the Catshuis after a meeting in preparation for the NATO summit in Madrid. The discussions include the Russian invasion of Ukraine.
Spain	Madrid	28–30 June	Frederiksen attended the NATO summit.
United Kingdom	London	1 October	Met with Prime Minister Liz Truss at 10 Downing Street. They agreed that the safety and security of the Baltic Sea is in everyone's interest, and welcomed increased cooperation through the Joint Expeditionary Force.
Czech Republic	Prague	6 October	Frederiksen travelled to Prague to attend the inaugural meeting of the European Political Community.
Egypt	Sharm El Sheikh	7–8 November	Frederiksen attended the high level segment of COP27.

=== 2023 ===
Country	Location(s)	Dates	Details
Ukraine	Mykolaiv	30 January	Met with President Volodymyr Zelenskyy in the southern city of Mykolaiv
Germany	Munich	17–19 February	Attended the 59th Munich Security Conference.
Finland	Helsinki	3 May	Frederiksen travelled to Finland to meet with Finnish president Sauli Niinistö, Swedish prime minister Ulf Kristersson, Norwegian prime minister Jonas Gahr Støre and Icelandic prime minister Katrín Jakobsdóttir. They spoke about security issues, Nordic cooperation and their countries continued strong support for Ukraine. The meeting concluded with a Nordic–Ukrainian summit which was visited by Ukrainian president Volodymyr Zelenskyy.
Iceland	Reykjavík	16–17 May	Frederiksen attended the 4th Council of Europe summit.
Moldova	Mimi Castle, Bulboaca, Chișinău	1 June	Frederiksen travelled to Moldova to attend the 2nd European Political Community Summit.
United States	Washington, D.C.	5 June	Met with President Joe Biden.
Namibia	Windhoek	19 June	Frederiksen and Dutch prime minister Mark Rutte met with Namibian president Hage Geingob. Both countries led a trade mission aimed at building green hydrogen supply chains to Europe.
Iceland	Vestmannaeyjar	25–26 June	Frederiksen travelled to Vestmannaeyjar in Iceland to meet with Nordic prime ministers Katrín Jakobsdóttir (Iceland), Petteri Orpo (Finland), Jonas Gahr Støre (Norway) and Ulf Kristersson (Sweden) as well as Canadian prime minister Justin Trudeau and leaders from the Faroe Islands, Greenland and Åland. They discussed security policy, crisis preparedness issues and the green transition.
Lithuania	Vilnius	11–12 July	Frederiksen travelled to Vilnius to attend the 2023 NATO Vilnius summit.
Finland	Helsinki	13 July	Frederiksen travelled to Helsinki to attend a meeting between the Nordic Prime Ministers Katrín Jakobsdóttir (Iceland), Petteri Orpo (Finland), Jonas Gahr Støre (Norway) and Ulf Kristersson (Sweden) and United States President Joe Biden.
Belgium	Brussels	17-18 July	Attended the 3rd EU–CELAC summit
Germany	Berlin	17 August	Met with Chancellor Olaf Scholz.
Ukraine	Kyiv	6 September	
Spain	Granada	5 October	Frederiksen attended the 3rd European Political Community Summit.
Sweden	Visby	12–13 October	Frederiksen attended the 2023 Joint Expeditionary Force summit.
Japan	Tokyo	23–26 October	Met with Prime Minister Fumio Kishida.
Norway	Oslo	13 December	Met with Prime Minister Jonas Gahr Støre, Finnish president Sauli Niinistö, Icelandic prime minister Katrín Jakobsdóttir, Ukrainian president Volodymyr Zelenskyy, and Swedish prime minister Ulf Kristersson at the second Nordic–Ukrainian summit.

=== 2024 ===
Country	Location(s)	Dates	Details
Germany	Munich	16–18 February	Attended the 60th Munich Security Conference
Ukraine	Lviv	23 February	Met with President Volodymyr Zelenskyy and signed an Agreement on security cooperation and long-term support Both countries signed a 10-year bilateral security cooperation agreement then.
Belgium	Brussels	21 March	Frederiksen attended the European Council summit.
Poland	Warsaw	15 April	Met with Prime Minister Donald Tusk and they discussed their countries' collaboration on developing an "Iron Dome" defense system designed to protect European skies from potential missile and drone attacks.
Belgium	Brussels	17–18 April	Frederiksen attended an extraordinary European Council meeting. Together with Prime Minister of the Netherlands, Mark Rutte, the prime minister of Czech Republic, Petr Fiala travelled to NATO headquarters to meet with Secretary General of NATO Jens Stoltenberg. They discussed the situation in Ukraine and agreed that NATO should have a greater role in coordinating security assistance and training for Ukraine over the longer term.
Sweden	Stockholm	13-14 May	Meeting with German chancellor Olaf Scholz, Prime Minister Ulf Kristersson, Finnish prime minister Petteri Orpo, Icelandic prime minister Bjarni Benediktsson, Norwegian prime minister Jonas Gahr Støre.
Sweden	Stockholm	31 May	Attended Nordic-Ukrainian summit hosted by Prime Minister Ulf Kristersson.
Switzerland	Lucerne	15–16 June	Attended Global Peace Summit.
Belgium	Brussels	17 June	Frederiksen attended an informal European Council summit.
United States	Washington, D.C.	9–11 July	Attended 2024 NATO summit
United Kingdom	Woodstock	18 July	Attended the 4th European Political Community Summit.
United States	New York City	22–23 September	Attended Summit of the Future and General debate of the seventy-ninth session of the United Nations General Assembly.
Hungary	Budapest	7 November	Frederiksen attended the 5th European Political Community Summit.
Azerbaijan	Baku	11 November	Frederiksen attended the 2024 United Nations Climate Change Conference.
Ukraine	Kyiv	19 November	Visited on the 1000th day of Russia's full-scale invasion.
Sweden	Harpsund	26–27 November	Attended Nordic-Baltic Summit hosted by Swedish prime minister Ulf Kristersson.
Estonia	Tallinn	16–17 December	Frederiksen attended the 2024 Joint Expeditionary Force summit. Following the summit, Frederiksen held a trilateral meeting with Finnish President Alexander Stubb and British Prime Minister Keir Starmer.

=== 2025 ===
Country	Location(s)	Dates	Details
Finland	Helsinki	14 January	Frederiksen attended the Baltic Sea NATO Allies Summit in Helsinki. He also met with President of Finland Alexander Stubb, Prime Minister of Estonia Kristen Michal, NATO secretary general Mark Rutte, and Vice-president of the European Commission Henna Virkkunen.
Germany	Berlin	28 January	Met with German Chancellor Olaf Scholz to discuss European security, the protection of critical infrastructure in the Baltic Sea, the war in Ukraine, and developments in the Middle East.
France	Paris	28 January	She then travelled to Paris to meet French President Emmanuel Macron.
Belgium	Brussels	28 January	She met with NATO Secretary General Mark Rutte at NATO Headquarters. The meeting took place during her European tour to seek support from Denmark’s allies amid US President Donald Trump’s statements regarding Greenland.
Belgium	Brussels	3 February	Frederiksen attended an informal European Council summit.
United Kingdom	London	4 February	Met with Prime Minister Keir Starmer for a bilateral at 10 Downing Street.
Germany	Munich	14–16 February	Attended the 61st Munich Security Conference.
France	Paris	17 February	Frederiksen joined an Emergency meeting of European leaders, hosted by President Macron, to respond to President Trump's push for peace negotiations to end the Russo-Ukrainian War.
Ukraine	Kyiv	24 February	Frederiksen travelled to Kyiv to mark the third anniversary of the Russian invasion of Ukraine.
United Kingdom	London	2 March	Frederiksen travelled to London, United Kingdom to attend the Summit on Ukraine
Belgium	Brussels	20–21 March	Frederiksen attended a European Council summit.
France	Paris	27 March	Frederiksen attended a meeting of the "Coalition of the willing" hosted by President Macron.
Greenland	Nuuk	2–4 April	Three-day visit to Greenland. Met with outgoing prime minister Múte B. Egede and incoming PM Jens-Frederik Nielsen. Frederiksen pledged support amid U.S. pressure, emphasizing that “you cannot annex another country.”
Norway	Oslo	9 May	Frederiksen attended the 2025 Joint Expeditionary Force summit.
Albania	Tirana	16 May	Attended the 6th European Political Community Summit.
Finland	Turku	26 May	Frederiksen travelled to Turku to meet with Nordic prime ministers Kristrún Frostadóttir (Iceland), Petteri Orpo (Finland), Jonas Gahr Støre (Norway) and Ulf Kristersson (Sweden) as well as German chancellor Friedrich Merz and leaders from the Faroe Islands (Aksel V. Johannesen), Greenland (Jens-Frederik Nielsen) and Åland (Katrin Sjögren).
Lithuania	Vilnius	2 June	Attended the Bucharest Nine summit.
Germany	Berlin	11 June	Met with Chancellor Friedrich Merz. They spoke of the need to bolster continental security, tighten immigration policies and ensuring global trade continues to run on a system of open markets and free trade.
Netherlands	The Hague	24–25 June	Frederiksen attended the 2025 NATO summit.
Belgium	Brussels	26–27 June	Frederiksen attended the European Council meeting.
Poland	Warsaw	28 August	Met with Karol Nawrocki, the presidents of Lithuania, Gitanas Nausėda, Estonia, Alar Karis, and Latvia, Edgars Rinkēvičs. These discussions with the leaders from the region are a preparatory step for Polish president's upcoming visit to Washington, D.C., next week. They also took part in a teleconference with Ukrainian president Volodymyr Zelenskyy.
France	Paris	4 September	Met with President Emmanuel Macron. Attended the 7th Coalition of the willing summit.
United Kingdom	London	26 September	Frederiksen travelled to London to meet with Prime Minister Keir Starmer. She also attended Global Progress Action Summit.
United Kingdom	London	24 October	Attended the 8th Coalition of the willing meeting.
Germany	Berlin	14–15 December	Attended a meeting with US envoys Steve Witkoff and Jared Kushner along with Chancellor Friedrich Merz, President of Ukraine Volodymyr Zelenskyy, Prime Minister of Norway Jonas Gahr Støre, Prime Minister of Sweden Ulf Kristersson, President of France Emmanuel Macron, President of Finland Alexander Stubb, Prime Minister Donald Tusk, Prime Minister of the United Kingdom Keir Starmer, Prime Minister of the Netherlands Dick Schoof, Prime Minister of Italy Giorgia Meloni, Secretary General of NATO Mark Rutte, President of the European Commission Ursula von der Leyen and President of the European Council António Costa to discuss the Trump peace plan.
Belgium	Brussels	18–19 December	Frederiksen attended the European Council summit.

=== 2026 ===
Country	Location(s)	Dates	Details
France	Paris	6 January	Frederiksen attended the Coalition of the Willing meeting in Paris with fellow leaders.
United Kingdom	Ellesborough	22 January	Met with Prime Minister Keir Starmer at Chequers.
Germany	Hamburg, Berlin	26–27 January	Frederiksen attended the 2026 North Sea Summit. She and prime minister of Greenland Jens-Frederik Nielsen met with German chancellor Friedrich Merz.
France	Paris	28 January	She and Prime Minister of Greenland Jens-Frederik Nielsen met French president Emmanuel Macron.
Belgium	Antwerp, Rijkhoven	11–12 February	Frederiksen attended the 3rd European Industry Summit. Next day participated in the informal meeting of EU heads of state and government.
Ukraine	Kyiv	24 February	Frederiksen travelled to Kyiv to meet President Volodymyr Zelenskyy and join Nordic-Baltic leaders in the coalition of the willing to mark the fourth anniversary of Russia’s full-scale invasion.
Norway	Oslo	15 March	Frederiksen attended a Nordic-Canadian summit in Olso and met with Nordic leaders and Canadian prime minister Mark Carney.
Belgium	Brussels	19–20 March	Frederiksen attended the European Council.
Cyprus	Nicosia	23–24 April	Frederiksen attended an informal meeting of the European Council summit.
Romania	Bucharest	13 May	Attended the Bucharest Nine summit.
Montenegro	Tivat	5 June	Attended the EU–Western Balkans Summit.
Estonia	Tallinn	9 June	Attended NB8 Prime Ministers’ Meeting.
Belgium	Brussels	18–19 June	Attended the European Council.
Turkey	Ankara	7–8 July	Frederiksen attended the 2026 Ankara NATO summit.
France	Paris	13–14 July	Frederiksen travelled to Paris to attend a meeting with heads of state and government within the Coalition of the Willing. Frederiksen attended Bastille Day celebrations.
Ukraine	Kyiv	23 August	Mette Frederiksen, together with Lithuanian president Gitanas Nausėda, Finnish president Alexander Stubb, Latvian prime minister Andris Kulbergs, Estonian prime minister Kristen Michal and Norwegian prime minister Jonas Gahr Støre, met unannounced with Ukrainian president Volodymyr Zelenskyy and Ukrainian prime minister Serhii Koretskyi on the sidelines of the NB8 summit in Kyiv to discuss winter preparations, protection and restoration of key energy infrastructure, and preparations for the Ukrainian reconstruction conference to be held in Tallinn in January next year. Mette Frederiksen and the leaders participated in events related to the Ukrainian National Flag Day.
Germany	Berlin	27 August	Mette Frederiksen visited Berlin, where she met with German Chancellor Friedrich Merz, Austrian Chancellor Christian Stocker and Finnish Prime Minister Petteri Orpo to discuss the EU's Multiannual Financial Framework for 2028–2034. The leaders discussed the priorities and financing of the next EU budget, including EU competitiveness, security and defence, migration, and support for Ukraine. They subsequently held a joint press conference at the Federal Chancellery.
Norway	Oslo	9 September	Frederiksen travelled to Oslo at the invitation of King Haakon VIII of Norway to attend the funeral of King Harald V of Norway.
Finland	Rovaniemi	13–14 September	Frederiksen travelled the European Arctic Summit.
United States	New York City	20–23 September	Frederiksen attended the 81st United Nations General Assembly and met with US President Donald Trump and Ukrainian President Volodymyr Zelenskyy. During this trip, she signed a trilateral security agreement around Greenland, putting the Greenland crisis to an end.
Belgium	Brussels	15–16 October	Frederiksen attended the European Council.
Finland	Helsinki	26–29 October	Attended the 78th Session of the Nordic Council. Participated in Nordic prime ministers’ and heads of government meetings on the Helsinki Treaty, comprehensive security, protection of children and youth online, and related events. On the margins, publicly criticised the uncoordinated phone call by Norwegian Prime Minister Jonas Gahr Støre and Finnish President Alexander Stubb with Russian President Vladimir Putin.
Ireland	Dublin	12–13 November	Attended the 9th European Political Community Summit. During this trip, she co-moderated a roundtable discussion on defending a democratic Europe alongside British Prime Minister Andy Burnham, covering democratic resilience, support for Ukraine and hybrid threats. Joined leaders’ statements on migration and key principles of European security. The visit continued with an informal meeting of the European Council focused on artificial intelligence.

== Future trips ==
Country	Location	Date	Details

== Multilateral meetings ==
Mette Frederiksen participated in the following summits during her premiership:

Group	Year										
Group	2019	2020	2021	2022	2023	2024	2025	2026	2027	2028	2029
UNGA	23–25 September, (United States) New York City	26 September, (videoconference) (United States) New York City	24 September, (United States) New York City	20–26 September, (United States) New York City	19–26 September, (United States) New York City	24–30 September, (United States) New York City	23 September, (United States) New York City	TBD, (United States) New York City	TBD, (United States) New York City	TBD, (United States) New York City	TBD, (United States) New York City
NATO	3–4 December, (United Kingdom) Watford	None	14 June, (Belgium) Brussels	24 March, (Belgium) Brussels	11–12 July, (Lithuania) Vilnius	9–11 July, (United States) Washington, D.C.	24–26 June, (Netherlands) The Hague	7–8 July, (Turkey) Ankara	TBD, (Albania) Tirana	TBD	TBD
NATO	3–4 December, (United Kingdom) Watford	None	14 June, (Belgium) Brussels	June 28–30, (Spain) Madrid	11–12 July, (Lithuania) Vilnius	9–11 July, (United States) Washington, D.C.	24–26 June, (Netherlands) The Hague	7–8 July, (Turkey) Ankara	TBD, (Albania) Tirana	TBD	TBD
EU–CELAC	None				17–18 July, (Belgium) Brussels	None	9–10 November, (Colombia) Santa Marta	None			
EPC	Didn't exist			6 October, (Czech Republic) Prague	1 June, (Moldova) Bulboaca	18 July, (United Kingdom) Woodstock	16 May, (Albania) Tirana	4 May, (Armenia) Yerevan	TBD, (Switzerland) TBD	TBD, (Azerbaijan) TBD	TBD
EPC	Didn't exist			6 October, (Czech Republic) Prague	5 October, (Spain) Granada	7 November, (Hungary) Budapest	2 October, (Denmark) Copenhagen	12 November, (Republic of Ireland) Dublin	TBD, (Greece) TBD	TBD, (Latvia) TBD	TBD, (Netherlands) TBD
UNCCC	2–13 December, (Spain) Madrid	None	1–2 November, (United Kingdom) Glasgow	7–8 November, (Egypt) Sharm el-Sheikh	30 November – 3 December, (United Arab Emirates) Dubai	11 November, (Azerbaijan) Baku	Did not attend (Turkey) Antalya	TBD	TBD	TBD	TBD
JEF	None			14–15 March, (United Kingdom) London	12–13 October, (Sweden) Visby	16–17 December, (Estonia) Tallinn	9 May, (Norway) Oslo	26 March, (Finland) Helsinki	26 March, (Iceland) Reykjavík	TBD	TBD
JEF	None			19 December, (Latvia) Riga	12–13 October, (Sweden) Visby	16–17 December, (Estonia) Tallinn	9 May, (Norway) Oslo	26 March, (Finland) Helsinki	26 March, (Iceland) Reykjavík	TBD	TBD
North Sea Summit	Didn't exist			18 May, (Denmark) Esbjerg	24 April, (Belgium) Ostend	None		26 January, (Germany) Hamburg	TBA	TBA	TBA
Others	None					Global Peace Summit; 15–16 June (Switzerland) Lucerne	Securing our future 2 March, (United Kingdom) London	Together for peace and security summit 6 January, (France) Paris			
Others	None					Global Peace Summit; 15–16 June (Switzerland) Lucerne	15 March, (videoconference); United Kingdom	Bucharest Nine; 13 May, (Romania) Bucharest			
Others	None					Global Peace Summit; 15–16 June (Switzerland) Lucerne	Building a robust peace for Ukraine and Europe; 27 March, (France) Paris	Determined to act 13 July, (France) Paris			
Others	None					Global Peace Summit; 15–16 June (Switzerland) Lucerne	Bucharest Nine; 2 June, (Lithuania) Vilnius	Determined to act 13 July, (France) Paris			
██ = Future event ██ = Did not attend / participate.
