= List of international presidential trips made by Ilie Bolojan =

This is a list of international presidential trips made by Ilie Bolojan during his time as acting President of Romania (12 February 2025 – 26 May 2025)

== List ==
2025

Country	City	Date	Notes
Moldova	Chișinău	1 March	
United Kingdom	Lancaster House, London	2 March	2025 London Summit on Ukraine
Belgium	Brussels	20–21 March	Bolojan attended a European Council summit.
France	Élysée Palace, Paris	27 March	Bolojan attended a meeting of the "Coalition of the willing" hosted by President Macron.
Vatican City	Vatican City	26 April	Bolojan attended at the funeral of Pope Francis.
Poland	Warsaw	28–29 April	participated in the tenth Three Seas Initiative leaders' meeting.
Albania	Tirana	16 May	6th European Political Community Summit
