= List of international prime ministerial trips made by Donald Tusk =

This is a list of international prime ministerial trips made by Donald Tusk, the 14th and 18th Prime Minister of Poland.

== Summary ==
=== First premiership ===
The number of visits per country where he has travelled are:

- One visit to: Belgium, Canada, China, Greece, India, Ireland, United States and Vietnam
- Three visits to: Russia

=== Second premiership ===
The number of visits per country where he has travelled are:

- One visit to: Albania, Angola, Armenia, Croatia, Cyprus, Denmark, Japan, Lithuania, Luxembourg, Montenegro, Norway, Romania, Serbia, Slovakia, South Korea, Sweden, Tajikistan, Turkey, the United States and Vatican City
- Two visits to: Czech Republic, Finland, Hungary, Italy, Moldova, and the Netherlands
- Three visits to: the United Kingdom
- Four visits to: Ukraine
- Six visits to Germany
- Eight visits to: France
- Nineteen visits to: Belgium

== First premiership (2007–2014) ==
=== 2007 ===
| Country | Location(s) | Dates | Details | Image |
|---|---|---|---|---|
| Belgium | Brussels | 4 December | Tusk paid an official visit to NATO headquarters on Tuesday. He met for a bilateral meeting with the Secretary General Jaap de Hoop Scheffer. They discussed the main elements of the current NATO agenda: operation in Afghanistan, Kosovo, relations with Russia, process of enlargement, missile defence, energy security and overall preparations for the NATO summit in Bucharest in April 2008. | |

=== 2008 ===
| Country | Location(s) | Dates | Details | Image |
|---|---|---|---|---|
| United States | Washington, D.C. | 9–10 March | Met with President George W. Bush | |

=== 2009 ===
| Country | Location(s) | Dates | Details | Image |

=== 2010 ===
| Country | Location(s) | Dates | Details | Image |

=== 2011 ===
| Country | Location(s) | Dates | Details | Image |

=== 2012 ===
| Country | Location(s) | Dates | Details | Image |
|---|---|---|---|---|
| Canada | Ottawa | 15 May | Met with Prime Minister Stephen Harper. He was the guest of honour at a reception for the Polish-Canadian community on Parliament Hill, hosted by Harper | |

=== 2013 ===
| Country | Location(s) | Dates | Details | Image |

=== 2014 ===
| Country | Location(s) | Dates | Details | Image |

== Second premiership (2023–present) ==
=== 2023 ===
| # | Country | Location(s) | Dates | Details | Image |
|---|---|---|---|---|---|
| 1 | Belgium | Brussels | 13–15 December | Tusk travelled to Brussels to meet with President of the European Commission Ursula von der Leyen. On this occasion, they gave a joint press statement stressing Poland's effort to put the rule of law at the top of the agenda and the joint endeavour to make progress on the NextGenerationEU. Attended the EU-Western Balkans summit followed by the European Council. | |

=== 2024 ===
| # | Country | Location(s) | Dates | Details | Image |
|---|---|---|---|---|---|
| 2 | Ukraine | Kyiv | 22 January | Travelled to Kyiv to meet with Ukrainian President Volodymyr Zelenskyy. | |
| 3 | Belgium | Brussels | 31 January–1 February | He took part in the ceremony commemorating the deceased former President of the European Commission, Jacques Delors, and in an extraordinary meeting of the European Council. | |
| 4 | France | Paris | 12 February | He met with French President Emmanuel Macron at the Elysee Palace and with German Chancellor Olaf Scholz in Berlin. The topic of the talks was security issues. | |
| 4 | Germany | Berlin | 12 February | He met with French President Emmanuel Macron at the Elysee Palace and with German Chancellor Olaf Scholz in Berlin. The topic of the talks was security issues. | |
| 5 | Czech Republic | Prague | 27 February | Prime Minister Donald Tusk attended the meeting of Prime Ministers of the Visegrad Group countries. The main topics of discussion were Russian aggression against Ukraine and the EU Green Deal. He also held a meeting with Czech President Petr Pavel. | |
| 6 | Lithuania | Vilnius | 4 March | He met with Prime Minister Ingrida Šimonytė and President Gitanas Nausėda. The main topic of discussion was the Russian aggression against Ukraine. | |
| 7 | Romania | Bucharest | 7 March | Meeting with Prime Minister Marcel Ciolacu and President Klaus Iohannis. Participation in the European People’s Party Congress. | |
| 8 | United States | Washington, D.C. | 11–12 March | Together with Polish President Andrzej Duda travelled to Washington to meet with President Joe Biden to mark the 25th anniversary of Poland joining NATO. The leaders reaffirmed their ironclad commitment to NATO and discussed support for Ukraine. | |
| 9 | Germany | Berlin | 15 March | Tusk met with Chancellor Olaf Scholz and French President Emmanuel Macron in as part of the Weimar Triangle to discuss aid to Ukraine. | |
| 10 | Belgium | Brussels | 21–22 March | He participated in the first Nuclear Energy Summit and the extraordinary meeting of the European Council. He met with the leaders of the Nordic and Baltic countries, Ireland, and UN Secretary-General António Guterres. | |
| 11 | Belgium | Brussels | 17–18 April | He participated in an informal meeting of the European Council. He met with Ukrainian president Volodymyr Zelenskyy and European Parliament President Roberta Metsola. | |
| 12 | Belgium | Brussels | 17 June | His participation in the NBIP8 coordination meeting and the informal meeting of the European Council devoted to the election of the heads of European institutions | |
| 13 | Luxembourg | Luxembourg City | 18 June | Tusk travelled to Luxembourg to meet with Prime Minister Luc Frieden. | |
| 14 | Belgium | Brussels | 27 June | Participation in the European Council. His participation in the meeting devoted to the election of heads of European institutions and issues of defense and cooperation with Ukraine. | |
| 15 | United Kingdom | Woodstock | 18 July | Tusk attends the 4th European Political Community Summit. | |
| 16 | Moldova | Chișinău | 4 September | He met with President Maia Sandu and Prime Minister Dorin Recean. Discussions focused on Moldova's EU accession process and economic cooperation. The Prime Minister also delivered a speech at an extraordinary session of the Parliament of the Republic of Moldova. | |
| 17 | Czech Republic | Prague | 9 October | The 9th Polish-Czech intergovernmental consultations, chaired by Donald Tusk and Czech Prime Minister Petr Fiala, focused on economic and energy cooperation and new solutions in European migration policy. | |
| 18 | Belgium | Brussels | 17–18 October | His participation in the European Council meeting devoted to migration, the war in Ukraine and the situation in the Middle East. | |
| 19 | Serbia | Belgrade | 23–24 October | He met with President Aleksandar Vučić and Prime Minister Miloš Vučević. Consultations focused on EU accession talks and economic and defense cooperation. The Prime Minister also met with Greek Prime Minister Kyriakos Mitsotakis, who was visiting Serbia. | |
| 20 | Hungary | Budapest | 7 November | Tusk attends the 5th European Political Community Summit in Budapest. | |
| 21 | Slovakia | Tatranská Javorina | 14 November | Unofficial Visit. Met with Slovak Prime Minister Robert Fico in Tatranská Javorina, on the Slovak-Polish border. Topics included the upcoming Polish presidency of the EU Council, the results of the US presidential election, and the situation in Ukraine. | |
| 22 | Sweden | Harpsund | 27–28 November | He attended a Nordic-Baltic Summit in the so-called NB8 format. He met with Swedish Prime Minister Ulf Kristersson as part of bilateral Polish-Swedish consultations and signed a new strategic partnership agreement. | |
| 23 | Ukraine | Lviv | 17 December | Meeting with President Volodymyr Zelenskyy. The talks focused on the current situation in Ukraine, bilateral defense cooperation, and the prospects for Ukraine's accession talks to the EU and NATO. | |
| 24 | Belgium | Brussels | 18–19 December | He attended the EU-Western Balkans summit, which focused on accelerating the EU accession process for countries in the region, and in the European Council meeting devoted to the situation in Ukraine, the Middle East, and migration policy. The Prime Minister also met with staff from the Permanent Representation of the Republic of Poland to the EU. | |

=== 2025 ===
| # | Country | Location(s) | Dates | Details | Image |
|---|---|---|---|---|---|
| 25 | Finland | Helsinki | 14 January | Tusk attended the Baltic Sea NATO Allies Summit in Helsinki. He also met with President of Finland Alexander Stubb, Prime Minister of Estonia Kristen Michal, NATO Secretary General Mark Rutte, and Vice-President of the European Commission Henna Virkkunen. | |
| 26 | France | Strasbourg | 22 January | He took part in the session of the European Parliament in Strasbourg, where he presented the priorities of the Polish presidency. | |
| 26 | Norway | Oslo | 22 January | Travelled to Oslo to meet with Prime Minister Jonas Gahr Støre. They discussed cooperation between the European Union and Norway, as well as regional security in the context of the war in Ukraine, were the main topics | |
| 27 | Belgium | Brussels | 3 February | Participation in the informal meeting of EU leaders. | |
| 28 | France | Paris | 17 February | The Prime Minister participated in an informal meeting of European leaders to discuss the situation in Ukraine and European security. The meeting was also attended by the heads of government of Germany, the United Kingdom, Italy, Spain, the Netherlands, and Denmark, as well as the President of the European Council, the President of the European Commission, and the Secretary General of NATO. | |
| 29 | United Kingdom | London | 2 March | Tusk travelled to London, United Kingdom to attend the Summit on Ukraine. | |
| 30 | Belgium | Brussels | 6 March | Participation of the Prime Minister in an extraordinary meeting of the European Council. | |
| 31 | Turkey | Ankara | 12 March | Travelled to Ankara to meet with President Recep Tayyip Erdoğan. | |
| 32 | Belgium | Brussels | 20–21 March | Participation in the European Council summit on deregulation, rearmament of Europe and migration. | |
| 33 | France | Paris | 27 March | Tusk attended a meeting of the "Coalition of the willing" hosted by President Macron. | |
| 34 | Netherlands | Wageningen | 5 May | He attended the celebrations of the Liberation Day of the Netherlands, where he delivered a speech. He also met with King Willem-Alexander of the Netherlands and Prime Minister Dick Schoof. | |
| 35 | France | Nancy | 9 May | Joint participation of Prime Minister Donald Tusk and French President Emmanuel Macron in the celebrations in Nancy on the occasion of the signing of the Polish-French treaty providing mutual security guarantees and military support. | |
| 35 | Ukraine | Kyiv | 10 May | Tusk met with French President Emmanuel Macron, German Chancellor Friedrich Merz, and British Prime Minister Keir Starmer on board a train to Kyiv. | |
| 36 | Albania | Tirana | 16 May | Tusk attended the 6th European Political Community Summit. | |
| 37 | Netherlands | The Hague | 24–25 June | Travelled to Hague to attend NATO summit | |
| 37 | Belgium | Brussels | 26–27 June | Participation in the European Council summit on the security and defense of Ukraine, discussion of the situation in Moldova and the Western Balkan countries, discussion of the implementation of the 18th package of sanctions against Russia | |
| 38 | Italy | Rome | 10 July | Attended a conference on Ukraine's reconstruction. He held talks with leaders of the so-called Coalition of the Willing, including Ukrainian President Volodymyr Zelenskyy and Italian Prime Minister Giorgia Meloni. | |
| 39 | Moldova | Chișinău | 27 August | Tusk met with Moldovan President Maia Sandu along with German chancellor Friedrich Merz and French President Emmanuel Macron. | |
| 40 | France | Paris | 4 September | Met with President Emmanuel Macron. Attended the 7th Coalition of the willing summit. | |
| 41 | Denmark | Copenhagen | 1–2 October | Attended the 7th European Political Community Summit. The talks focused on strengthening the security and stability of the European continent and providing assistance to struggling Ukraine | |
| 42 | Belgium | Brussels | 24–25 October | Attended the 252nd European Council summit, where the leaders discussed the ETS2 revision, climate policy, and aid for Ukraine. He met with the leaders of Germany, France, Ukraine, and Denmark. | |
| 43 | Angola | Luanda | 24–25 November | The Prime Minister's participation in the 7th African Union-European Union summit in Luanda. The main topics of the talks were peace and security, economic development and job creation. Participation in the summit of European Union leaders on the 28-point peace plan for Ukraine presented by the United States. The Prime Minister met with Angolan President João Lourenço and Egyptian Prime Minister Mostafa Madbouly. | |
| 44 | Germany | Berlin | 1 December | Polish-German consultations in Berlin, chaired by Prime Minister Donald Tusk and German Chancellor Friedrich Merz, focused on security and defense. Issues related to the development of infrastructure and energy investments were also discussed. | |
| 45 | Germany | Berlin | 14–15 December | Attended a meeting with US envoys Steve Witkoff and Jared Kushner along with Chancellor Friedrich Merz, President of Ukraine Volodymyr Zelenskyy, Prime Minister of Norway Jonas Gahr Støre, Prime Minister of Denmark Mette Frederiksen, Prime Minister of Sweden Ulf Kristersson, President of France Emmanuel Macron, President of Finland Alexander Stubb, Prime Minister of the United Kingdom Keir Starmer, Prime Minister of the Netherlands Dick Schoof, Prime Minister of Italy Giorgia Meloni, Secretary General of NATO Mark Rutte, President of the European Commission Ursula von der Leyen and President of the European Council António Costa to discuss the Trump peace plan. | |
| 45 | Finland | Helsinki | 16 December | Met with Prime Minister Petteri Orpo, Swedish Prime Minister Ulf Kristersson, Latvian Prime Minister Evika Siliņa, Lithuanian President Gitanas Nausėda, Polish Prime Minister Donald Tusk, Romanian President Nicușor Dan and Bulgarian Prime Minister Rosen Zhelyazkov at the Eastern Front Summit in Helsinki, where the discussion focused on Europe securing its Eastern Front at a faster pace and through joint initiatives. | |
| 46 | Belgium | Brussels | 18–19 December | Attended European Council meeting devoted to financial support for Ukraine and discussion of the strategy for using part of frozen Russian assets. The European defence strategy was also discussed. | |

=== 2026 ===
| # | Country | Location(s) | Dates | Details | Image |
|---|---|---|---|---|---|
| 47 | France | Paris | 6 January | Tusk attended the Coalition of the Willing meeting in Paris with fellow leaders. | |
| 48 | Belgium | Brussels | 22 January | Attended the informal European Council summit was held to address the US claims to Greenland. The Prime Minister met with Lithuanian President Gitanas Nausėda and the Prime Ministers of Finland, Denmark, Latvia, and Ireland. He also met with Czech Prime Minister Andrej Babiš. | |
| 49 | Croatia | Zagreb | 30–31 January | Attended the EPP Leaders’ Retreat. | |
| 50 | Ukraine | Kyiv | 5 February | His meeting with Ukrainian President Volodymyr Zelenskyy and Prime Minister Yulia Svyrydenko focused on support for Ukraine's energy system. They signed a letter of intent regarding joint weapons and ammunition. | |
| 51 | Belgium | Antwerp, Rijkhoven | 12 February | He attended an informal summit of European Union leaders in Rijkhoven. Topics discussed included EU competitiveness, including strengthening the single market and developing strategic autonomy | |
| 52 | Germany | Munich | 13-14 February | Attended the 62nd Munich Security Conference. He attended a meeting of the Coalition of the Willing. He met with Swedish Prime Minister Ulf Kristersson and the leader of the Hungarian opposition. He participated in the ceremony of awarding the Evald von Kleist Prize to the Ukrainian nation, delivering a laudatory speech at the Munich Security Conference and met with Ukrainian President Volodymyr Zelenskyy. | |
| 53 | Belgium | Brussels | 19–20 March | Participated in the European Council meeting, which focused on the competitiveness of the European Union, the situation in Ukraine and the Middle East, the new European Union budget, and European security and defense. The Prime Minister also discussed the EU ETS | |
| 54 | Tajikistan | | 11 April | He held talks with the country's Deputy Prime Minister, Usmonali Usmondoza, regarding security. | |
| 54 | South Korea | Seoul | 12–13 April | Met with president Lee Jae Myung and Prime Minister Kim Min-seok focused on strengthening bilateral cooperation in security and defense, new technologies, and digitalization. | |
| 54 | Japan | Tokyo | 13–15 April | The meeting with Prime Minister Sanae Takaichi focused on bilateral cooperation in the economic and security sectors. The Prime Minister also met with representatives of the Japan Business Federation. | |
| 55 | Cyprus | Nicosia | 23–24 April | Tusk attended an informal meeting of the European Council summit. | |
| 56 | Armenia | Yerevan | 3–4 May | Tusk attended the 8th European Political Community Summit. | |
| 57 | Vatican City | Vatican City | 7 May | The meeting with Pope Leo XIV focused on peace and world unity. The situation in the Middle East and the war in Ukraine were discussed. | |
| 57 | Italy | Rome | 7 May | A conversation with Italian Prime Minister Giorgia Meloni about a new phase of economic cooperation between the two countries. The war in Ukraine, the EU Emissions Trading System, and European funds were also discussed. | |
| 58 | United Kingdom | Northolt | 27 May | Visit with the Prime Minister Keir Starmer, was related to the signing of the Security and Defence Partnership Treaty. | |
| 59 | Montenegro | Tivat | 5 June | He participated in the European Union-Western Balkans summit. Discussion topics included the prospect of European Union enlargement to include Western Balkan countries and security cooperation. The Prime Minister met with the President Jakov Milatović. | |
| 60 | Belgium | Brussels | 18–19 June | Tusk attended the European Council meeting. The main topics of discussion included the current situation in Ukraine and the Middle East, the European Union's new Multiannual Financial Framework for 2028-34, and defense and security policy. The Prime Minister met with the heads of government of the V4 countries and the President of UkraineVolodymyr Zelenskyy. | |
| 61 | Hungary | Gödöllő | 23 June | The meeting with the heads of government of the V4 countries was devoted to the future of regional cooperation, EU issues, security and current geopolitical challenges. | |
| 61 | Germany | Berlin | 24 June | Tusk attended an E5 meeting with Chancellor Friedrich Merz, British Prime Minister Keir Starmer, French President Emmanuel Macron, and Italian Prime Minister Giorgia Meloni, focused on preparation for the upcoming NATO summit in Ankara, the situation in Ukraine and the Middle East, and cooperation of defense industries | |
| 62 | France | Paris | 13–14 July | Tusk attended a meeting of leaders of the Coalition of the Willing countries in Paris. The talks focused on supporting Ukraine, concluding a peace agreement, and ensuring security guarantees for Ukraine. He took part in a military parade on the occasion of the French National Day. | |
| 63 | Ukraine | Ivano-Frankivsk | 18 September | Tusk is with President of Romania Nicușor Dan and President of Serbia Aleksandar Vucic travelled the Carpathian Eight summit. | |
| 64 | Belgium | Brussels | 15–16 October | Tusk attended the European Council. | |

== Future trips ==
| Country | Location | Date | Details |
|---|---|---|---|
| Ireland | Dublin | 12 November | Tusk is plan to attend the 9th European Political Community Summit. |

== Multilateral meetings ==
=== First Premiership ===
Donald Tusk participated in the following summits during his second premiership:

| Group | Year | | | | | | | |
| Group | 2007 | 2008 | 2009 | 2010 | 2011 | 2012 | 2013 | 2014 |
|---|---|---|---|---|---|---|---|---|
| EU–CELAC | none | | | | | | 26–27 January, (Chile) Santiago | None |

=== Second Premiership ===
Donald Tusk participated in the following summits during his second premiership:

| Group | Year | | | |
| Group | 2024 | 2025 | 2026 | 2027 |
|---|---|---|---|---|
| NATO | 9–11 July, (United States) Washington, D.C. | 24–25 June, (Netherlands) The Hague | 7–8 July, (Turkey) Ankara | TBD, (Albania) Tirana |
| Ukraine Recovery Conference | 11–12 June, (Germany) Berlin | 10–11 July, (Italy) Rome | 25–26 June, (Poland) Gdańsk | 27–28 January, (Estonia) Tallinn |
| EPC | 18 July, (United Kingdom) Woodstock | 16 May, (Albania) Tirana | 4 May, (Armenia) Yerevan | TBD, (Switzerland) TBD |
| EPC | 7 November, (Hungary) Budapest | 2 October, (Denmark) Copenhagen | 12 November, (Republic of Ireland) Dublin | TBD, (Greece) TBD |
| EU–CELAC | None | 9–10 November, (Colombia) Santa Marta | None | |
| Others | None | Securing our future 2 March, (United Kingdom) London | Together for peace and security summit 6 January, (France) Paris | TBA |
| Others | None | 15 March, (videoconference); United Kingdom | Determined to act 13 July, (France) Paris | TBA |
| Others | None | Building a robust peace for Ukraine and Europe; 27 March, (France) Paris | Determined to act 13 July, (France) Paris | TBA |
██ = Future event.
