= List of international trips made by Christian Stocker =

This is the list of international trips made by Christian Stocker, who is currently serving as Chancellor of Austria since 3 March 2025.

== Summary ==
The number of visits per country where chancellor Christian Stocker traveled are:

- One visit to Albania, Cyprus, Denmark, France and the United Kingdom
- Two visits to Germany and Vatican City
- Six visits to Belgium

== 2025 ==
Country	Location(s)	Date	Details	Image
Belgium	Brussels	20–21 March	Stocker attended a European Council summit.	
Vatican City	Vatican City	26 April	Stocker attended the funeral of Pope Francis.	
Albania	Tirana	16 May	Stocker attended the 6th European Political Community Summit.	
Vatican City	Vatican City	18 May	Stocker attended the inauguration mass and met with Pope Leo XIV.	
Belgium	Brussels	26–27 June	Stocker attended the European Council meeting.	
Germany	Berlin	27 June	Met with Chancellor Friedrich Merz.	
Cyprus	Nicosia	21–22 August	Christian Stocker paid an official visit to Nicosia, he met with President Nikos Christodoulides to discuss bilateral relations and cooperation in the fields of the economy, migration, tourism, education, energy and security, as well as Cyprus's upcoming presidency of the Council of the European Union. They also discussed European competitiveness, migration, EU enlargement, energy, the situation in the Middle East, the war in Ukraine, and the Cyprus problem. Stocker also met with Annita Demetriou, President of the House of Representatives.	
Denmark	Copenhagen	1–2 October	Stocker attended the informal meeting of EU heads of state and government. Merz attended the 7th European Political Community Summit.	
United Kingdom	London	22 October	Stocker attended Western Balkans Summit.	

== 2026 ==
Country	Location(s)	Date	Details	Image
Belgium	Antwerp, Rijkhoven	11–12 February	Stocker attended the 3rd European Industry Summit. Next day participated in the informal meeting of EU heads of state and government.	
Belgium	Brussels	19–20 March	Stocker attended the European Council.	
Belgium	Brussels	18–19 June	Stocker attended the European Council.	
France	Paris	13–14 July	Stocker travelled to Paris to attend a meeting with heads of state and government within the Coalition of the Willing. Stocker attended Bastille Day celebrations.	
Germany	Berlin	27 August	Christian Stocker visited Berlin, where he met with German Chancellor Friedrich Merz, Danish Prime Minister Mette Frederiksen and Finnish Prime Minister Petteri Orpo to discuss the EU's Multiannual Financial Framework for 2028–2034. The leaders discussed the priorities and financing of the next EU budget, including EU competitiveness, security and defence, migration, and support for Ukraine. They subsequently held a joint press conference at the Federal Chancellery.	
Belgium	Brussels	15–16 October	Stocker attended the European Council.	

== Future trips ==
Country	Location	Date	Details
Hungary	Budapest	22-23 October	Stocker is plan to attend the 70th Anniversary Commemoration Ceremony Hungarian Revolution of 1956.
Ireland	Dublin	12 November	Stocker is plan to attend the 9th European Political Community Summit.

== Multilateral meetings ==
Christian Stocker is scheduled to participate in the following summits during his chancellorship:

Group	Year				
Group	2025	2026	2027	2028	2029
EPC	16 May, (Albania) Tirana	4 May,^{[a]} (Armenia) Yerevan	TBD, (Switzerland) TBD	TBD (Azerbaijan) TBD	TBD
EPC	2 October, (Denmark) Copenhagen	12 November, (Republic of Ireland) Dublin	TBD, (Greece) TBD	TBD, (Latvia) TBD	TBD (Netherlands) TBD
EU–CELAC	9 November, (Colombia) Santa Marta	None			
Others	Building a robust peace for Ukraine and Europe; 27 March, (France) Paris	Together for peace and security summit 6 January, (France) Paris	TBA	TBA	TBA
Others	Building a robust peace for Ukraine and Europe; 27 March, (France) Paris	Determined to act 13 July (France) Paris	TBA	TBA	TBA
██ = Future event. ██ = Did not attend.^a
