= List of international prime ministerial trips made by Bart De Wever =

This is a list of international prime ministerial trips made by Bart De Wever, current Prime Minister of Belgium since 3 February 2025.

== Summary ==
De Wever has visited 15 countries during his tenure as prime minister. The number of visits per country where De Wever has traveled are:

- One visit to Albania, Armenia, Cyprus, Denmark, Luxembourg, Netherlands, Switzerland, Turkey, Ukraine, the United Kingdom and the United States
- Two visits to Germany and Vatican City
- Four visits to France

== 2025 ==
Country	Location(s)	Dates	Details
France	Paris	27 March	De Wever attended a meeting of the "Coalition of the willing" hosted by President Macron.
Ukraine	Kyiv	8 April	Met with President Volodymyr Zelenskyy. The two leaders also discussed the issue of maintaining sanctions against Russia.
Vatican City	Vatican City	26 April	Attended funeral of Pope Francis.
Albania	Tirana	16 May	De Wever attended the 6th European Political Community Summit.
Vatican City	Vatican City	18 May	Attended Papal inauguration of Pope Leo XIV.
Netherlands	The Hague	24–25 June	De Wever attended the 2025 NATO summit
Germany	Berlin	26 August	De Wever met with Chancellor Friedrich Merz in Berlin.
France	Paris	4 September	Met with President Emmanuel Macron. Attended the 7th Coalition of the willing summit.
Luxembourg	Luxembourg City	10 September	De Wever attended the Benelux Summit.
United States	New York City	22–25 September	Attended the General debate of the eightieth session of the United Nations General Assembly.
Denmark	Copenhagen	2 October	Attended the 7th European Political Community Summit.
United Kingdom	London	12 December	Met with Prime Minister Keir Starmer.

== 2026 ==
Country	Location(s)	Dates	Details
France	Paris	6 January	De Wever attended the Coalition of the Willing meeting in Paris with fellow leaders.
Switzerland	Davos	20 January	Attended the World Economic Forum he warned that Europe risks becoming a "miserable slave" to the United States if it does not unite. He accused U.S. president Donald Trump of "crossing red lines," specifically citing threats related to Greenland.
Germany	Hamburg	26 January	De Wever attended the 2026 North Sea Summit.
Cyprus	Nicosia	23–24 April	De Wever attended an informal meeting of the European Council summit.
Armenia	Yerevan	3–4 May	De Wever attended the 8th European Political Community Summit.
Turkey	Ankara	7–8 July	De Wever attended the 2026 Ankara NATO summit.
France	Paris	13 July	De Wever travelled to Paris to attend a meeting with heads of state and government within the Coalition of the Willing.

== Future trips ==
Country	Location	Date	Details
Hungary	Budapest	22-23 October	Wever is plan to attend the 70th Anniversary Commemoration Ceremony Hungarian Revolution of 1956.
Ireland	Dublin	12 November	Wever is plan to attend the 9th European Political Community Summit.
Cambodia	Phnom Penh	15–16 November	Wever is scheduled to attend the 20th Organisation internationale de la Francophonie summit.

== Multilateral meetings ==
Bart De Wever participated in the following summits during his premiership:

Group	Year			
Group	2025	2026	2027	2028
UNGA	25 September, (United States) New York City	TBD, (United States) New York City	TBD, (United States) New York City	TBD, (United States) New York City
NATO	24–25 June (Netherlands) The Hague	7–8 July, (Turkey) Ankara	TBD, (Albania) Tirana	TBA
EPC	16 May, (Albania) Tirana	4 May, (Armenia) Yerevan	TBD, (Switzerland) TBD	TBD, (Azerbaijan) TBD
EPC	2 October, (Denmark) Copenhagen	12 November, (Republic of Ireland) Dublin	TBD, (Greece) TBD	TBD, (Latvia) TBD
North Sea Summit	None	26 January, (Germany) Hamburg	TBA	TBA
OIF	none	TBD, Cambodia	TBA	TBA
Others	15 March, (videoconference); United Kingdom	Together for peace and security summit 6 January, (France) Paris	TBA	TBA
Others	Building a robust peace for Ukraine and Europe; 27 March, (France) Paris	Determined to act 13 July, (France) Paris		
██ = Future event.
