= List of international prime ministerial trips made by Kristrún Frostadóttir =

This is a list of international prime ministerial trips made by Kristrún Frostadóttir, current Prime Minister of Iceland since 21 December 2024.

== Summary ==
Frostadóttir has visited 12 countries during her tenure as prime minister. The number of visits per country where Frostadóttir has traveled are:

- One visit to Albania, Estonia, Germany, Poland, Turkey and United Kingdom.
- Two visits to Belgium, Denmark, France, Netherlands, Norway and Ukraine.
- Three visits to Finland

== 2025 ==
Country	Location(s)	Dates	Details
Germany	Munich	16 February	Attended a panel discussion during the 61st Munich Security Conference.
Ukraine	Kyiv	24 February	Frostadóttir travelled to Kyiv to mark the third anniversary of the Russian invasion of Ukraine.
France	Paris	27 March	Frostadóttir attended a meeting of the "Coalition of the willing" hosted by President Macron.
Belgium	Brussels	9 April	Met with President of the European Commission Ursula von der Leyen and President of the European Council António Costa
Norway	Oslo	9 May	Frostadóttir attended the 2025 Joint Expeditionary Force summit.
Albania	Tirana	16 May	Frostadóttir attended the 6th European Political Community Summit.
Finland	Turku	26 May	Frostadóttir travelled to Turku to meet with Nordic prime ministers Ulf Kristersson (Sweden), Petteri Orpo (Finland), Mette Frederiksen (Denmark) and Jonas Gahr Støre (Norway) as well as German Chancellor Friedrich Merz and leaders from the Faroe Islands (Aksel V. Johannesen), Greenland (Jens-Frederik Nielsen) and Åland (Katrin Sjögren).
Netherlands	The Hague	27 May	Met with Prime Minister Dick Schoof at the Catshuis this evening. They discussed the upcoming NATO Summit in June and about the possibility of Iceland joining the EU.
Belgium	Brussels	28 May	Frostadóttir met with NATO Secretary General Mark Rutte in NATO headquarters to discuss Iceland's contributions to the Alliance, support to Ukraine, and preparations for the NATO Summit in The Hague.
Netherlands	The Hague	24–25 June	Frostadóttir attended the 2025 NATO summit
Denmark	Copenhagen	3 September	Met with Prime Minister Mette Frederiksen, President Volodymyr Zelenskyy and other leaders. Attended the Nordic-Baltic Eight summit.
United Kingdom	London	26 September	Frostadóttir travelled to London to meet with Prime Minister Keir Starmer. She also attended Global Progress Action Summit.
Denmark	Copenhagen	2 October	Attended the 7th European Political Community Summit.

== 2026 ==
Country	Location(s)	Dates	Details
France	Paris	6 January	Frostadóttir attended the Coalition of the Willing meeting in Paris with fellow leaders.
Ukraine	Kyiv	24 February	Frostadóttir travelled to Kyiv to meet President Volodymyr Zelenskyy and join Nordic-Baltic leaders in the coalition of the willing to mark the fourth anniversary of Russia’s full-scale invasion.
Norway	Oslo	15 March	Frostadóttir attended a Nordic-Canadian summit in Olso and met with Nordic leaders and Canadian Prime Minister Mark Carney.
Finland	Helsinki	26 March	Frostadóttir attended the 2026 JEF Leaders’ Summit.
Poland	Warsaw	28 March	Met with Prime Minister Donald Tusk to discuss bilateral relations and security cooperation, with a particular focus on Iceland's potential integration with the European Union. The leaders emphasized that closer integration among like-minded states would strengthen European security and highlighted shared positions on Russia's war against Ukraine and continued support for Ukraine. The talks also covered defense cooperation and broader international challenges, with both sides stressing the importance of joint efforts within the NATO and the need for a unified response to current geopolitical threats.
Estonia	Tallinn	9 June	Frostadóttir is attended the NB8 Prime Ministers’ Meeting.
Turkey	Ankara	7–8 July	Frostadóttir attended the 2026 Ankara NATO summit.
Finland	Rovaniemi	13–14 September	Frostadóttir attended to the European Arctic Summit.

== Future trips ==
Country	Location	Date	Details
Hungary	Budapest	22-23 October	Frostadóttir is with President Halla Tómasdóttir expected to attend the 70th Anniversary Commemoration Ceremony Hungarian Revolution of 1956.
Ireland	Dublin	12 November	Frostadóttir is plan to attend the 9th European Political Community Summit.
Turkey	Antalya	November	Frostadóttir is scheduled to attend the 2026 United Nations Climate Change Conference.

== Multilateral meetings ==
Kristrún Frostadóttir participated in the following summits during her premiership:

Group	Year			
Group	2025	2026	2027	2028
NATO	24–25 June (Netherlands) The Hague	7–8 July, (Turkey) Ankara	TBD, (Albania) Tirana	TBA
EPC	16 May, (Albania) Tirana	4 May,^{[a]} (Armenia) Yerevan	TBD, (Switzerland) TBD	TBD, (Azerbaijan) TBD
EPC	2 October, (Denmark) Copenhagen	12 November, (Republic of Ireland) Dublin	TBD, (Greece) TBD	TBD, (Latvia) TBD
JEF	9 May, (Norway) Oslo	26 March, (Finland) Helsinki	TBD	TBD
North Sea Summit	None	26 January, (Germany) Hamburg	TBA	TBA
Others	15 March, (videoconference); United Kingdom	Together for peace and security summit 6 January, (France) Paris	TBA	TBA
Others	Building a robust peace for Ukraine and Europe; 27 March, (France) Paris	Together for peace and security summit 6 January, (France) Paris		
██ = Future event ██ = Did not attend / participate.^aShe didn't travel due to the domestic political campaign preceding the August 2026 referendum on Iceland's EU membership negotiations.
