= List of international prime ministerial trips made by Rosen Zhelyazkov =

This is a list of international prime ministerial trips made by Rosen Zhelyazkov, who served as the Prime Minister of Bulgaria from 16 January 2025 to 19 February 2026.

== Summary ==
Zhelyazkov has visited 12 countries during his tenure as prime minister. The number of visits per country where Zhelyazkov has traveled are:

- One visit to Albania, Denmark, Finland, Germany, Moldova, Netherlands, Ukraine, the United Kingdom and the United States
- Two visits to Vatican City
- Four visits to France
- Six visits to Belgium

== 2025 ==
Country	Location(s)	Dates	Details
France	Strasbourg	21–22 January	His first working visit as prime minister.
Belgium	Brussels	3 February	Attended an informal meeting of the European Council.
France	Paris	11 February	Zhelyazkov travelled to Paris to attend the Artificial Intelligence Action Summit.
Belgium	Brussels	20–21 March	Zhelyazkov attended a European Council summit.
France	Paris	27 March	Zhelyazkov attended a meeting of the "Coalition of the willing" hosted by President Macron.
Vatican City	Vatican City	26 April	Attended funeral of Pope Francis.
Albania	Tirana	16 May	Zhelyazkov attended the 6th European Political Community Summit.
Vatican City	Vatican City	23 May	Met with Pope Leo XIV.
Ukraine	Odesa	11 June	Attended the fourth Ukraine-Southeast Europe Summit. Met with President Volodymyr Zelenskyy.
Netherlands	The Hague	24–25 June	Zhelyazkov attended the 2025 NATO summit.
Belgium	Brussels	26–27 June	Zhelyazkov attended the European Council meeting.
Moldova	Chișinău, Taraclia	27–28 July	On the first day of the visit, an official welcoming ceremony will be held for Zhelyazkov, followed by a bilateral meeting with the prime minister of Moldova, Dorin Recean, and plenary talks between the two delegations. After the talks, the two government leaders will give a joint press conference. On the next day, Zhelyazkov is scheduled to hold meetings with the president of Moldova, Maia Sandu, and with the president of Parliament, Igor Grosu.
United States	New York City	26 September	Attended General debate of the eightieth session of the United Nations General Assembly.
Denmark	Copenhagen	2 October	Attended the 7th European Political Community Summit.
United Kingdom	London	22 October	Attended Western Balkans Summit and met with Prime Minister Keir Starmer.
Belgium	Brussels	23 October	Attended the 252nd European Council summit.
Finland	Helsinki	16 December	Met with Prime Minister Petteri Orpo, Swedish prime minister Ulf Kristersson, Estonian prime minister Kristen Michal, Latvian prime minister Evika Siliņa, Lithuanian president Gitanas Nausėda, Polish prime minister Donald Tusk and Romanian president Nicușor Dan at the Eastern Front Summit in Helsinki, where the discussion focused on Europe securing its Eastern Front at a faster pace and through joint initiatives.
Belgium	Brussels	17 December	Zhelyazkov attended EU-Western Balkans and the European Council summit.

== 2026 ==
Country	Location(s)	Dates	Details
France	Paris	6 January	Zhelyazkov attended the Coalition of the Willing meeting in Paris with fellow leaders.
Belgium	Antwerp, Rijkhoven	11–12 February	Zhelyazkov attended the 3rd European Industry Summit. Next day participated in the informal meeting of EU heads of state and government.
Germany	Munich	13–15 February	Zhelyazkov attended the 62nd Munich Security Conference.

== Multilateral meetings ==
Rosen Zhelyazkov participated in the following summits during his premiership:

Group	Year	
Group	2025	2026
UNGA	26 September, (United States) New York City	
AI	11 February (France) Paris	
NATO	24–25 June (Netherlands) The Hague	
EPC	16 May, (Albania) Tirana	
EPC	2 October, (Denmark) Copenhagen	
Others	15 March, (videoconference); United Kingdom	Together for peace and security summit 6 January, (France) Paris
Others	Building a robust peace for Ukraine and Europe; 27 March, (France) Paris	Together for peace and security summit 6 January, (France) Paris
