= Proposed multinational force in Ukraine =

Proposed force for peace enforcement

A multinational force in Ukraine was proposed by the coalition of the willing in 2025 as part of a possible peace process in relation to the 2022 full-scale Russian invasion of Ukraine. A letter of intent to create the force was signed by Ukrainian president Volodymyr Zelenskyy, French president Emmanuel Macron, and British prime minister Keir Starmer on 6 January 2026. A training exercise of 2800 personnel of the proposed force was held in Poland in November 2026.

Russian spokesperson Maria Zakharova stated that the deployment of the proposed multinational force in Ukraine would be "fundamentally unacceptable" and that deployed troops would be regarded "as legitimate military targets."

== Role ==
In late October 2025, UK defence secretary John Healey described the proposed force as a peacekeeping force, following a ceasefire between Russia and Ukraine, that would include air, land and sea components. On 15 December 2025, a group of European leaders issued a statement declaring that the role of the force would be to "assist in the regeneration of Ukraine's forces, in securing Ukraine's skies, and in supporting safer seas, including through operating inside Ukraine", and that it would constitute one element of a six-point European proposal towards peace between Ukraine and Russia.

== Ceasefire condition ==
Official statements about the planned force typically stated that a ceasefire between Russia and Ukraine would be required before deployment of the force.

== Plans ==
Discussions for creating the possible multinational force took place in 2025. In March, UK parliamentarian Ben Obese-Jecty referred to the force as "Multinational Force Ukraine". In July, UK prime minister Keir Starmer stated that a command structure had been established. Headquarters were set up at Fort Mont-Valérien near Paris, with English as a 'primary working language' for three-star command; a British two-star military officer was assigned to lead two-star-level headquarters in Kyiv. In January 2026, UK defence secretary John Healey stated that £200 million had been allocated for the force.

On 26 September, French president Emmanuel Macron stated that 26 states had committed to contribute to the force,using the term "Multinational Force Ukraine". Possible roles for the would-be force ranged from a rapid reaction force, a sky shield over part of Ukraine, shifting the training of Ukrainian forces to Ukrainian territory, or a peacekeeping force ranging from 5000 to 100,000 land soldiers, supported by air and sea forces. As of October 2025, plans included forces from 30 countries, initially led by a French general, with headquarters in Paris, with rotation to a British leader, based in London, a year later. As of December 2025, French and British forces were seen as the likely main components of the force. Two hundred people from the 30 likely countries were involved in military planning. Countries expected to contribute to a lesser degree include Belgium, Canada, Denmark, Estonia, Finland, Latvia, Lithuania, the Netherlands, Norway, Sweden and, possibly, Turkey.

On 6 January 2026, Zelenskyy, Macron, and Starmer signed a letter of intent for the creation of the multinational force in Ukraine, to be deployed "post-war".

In June 2026, UK defence secretary Dan Jarvis stated that in July, the UK would take command of the Multinational Force for Ukraine headquarters in Kyiv, led by Tom Bateman with the status of Lieutenant-general.

=== Proposed main components ===
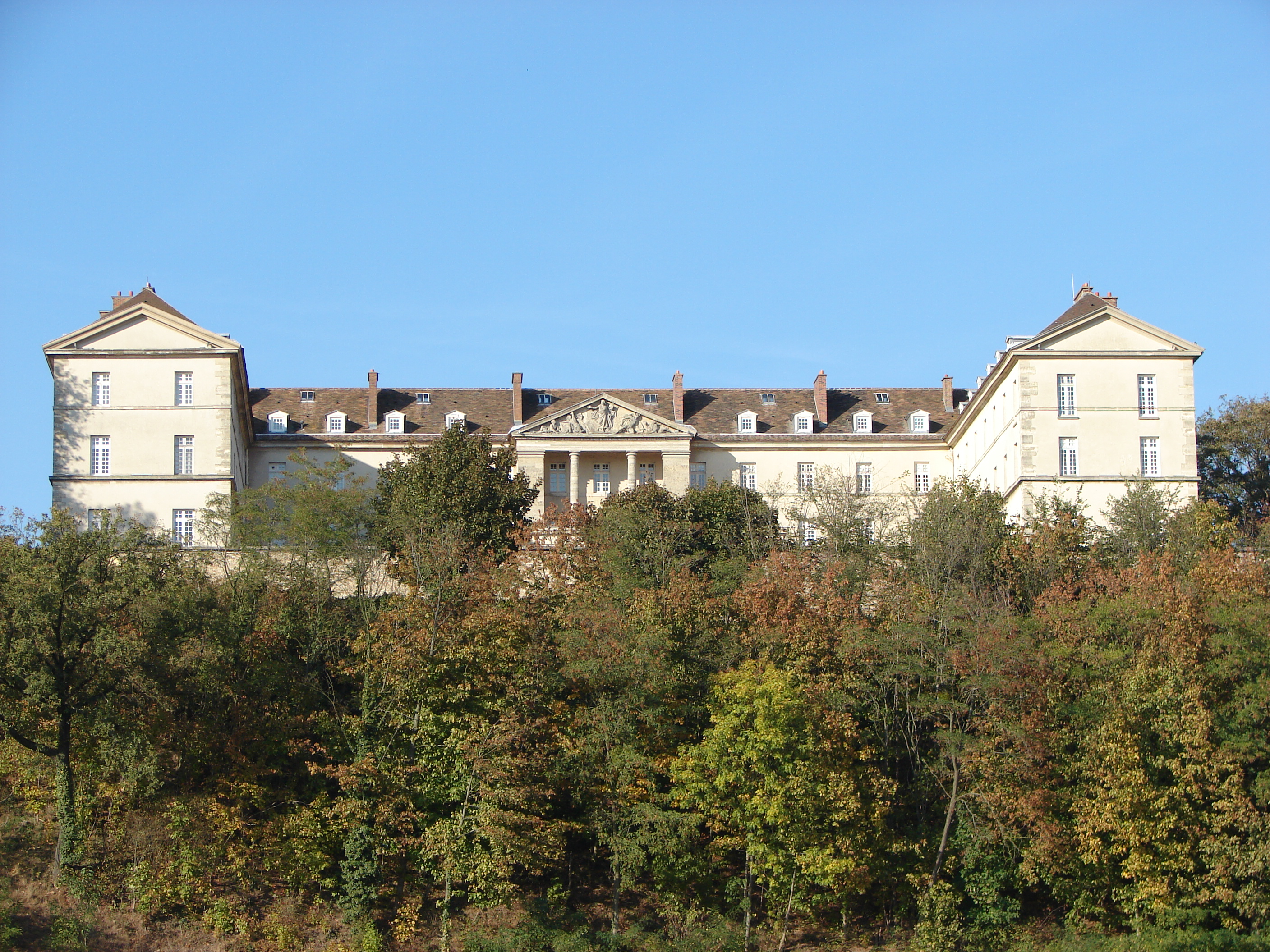
Main building of Forteresse du Mont-Valérien, where headquarters of a possible multinational force were located in late 2025.

The likely main components of the force would be from France and the UK. As of late November 2025, French authorities considered deployment of French forces in Ukraine to require a ceasefire, but not require Russian agreement on deployment, nor require US military support. French and British authorities started cooperating as co-leaders of a possible multinational force, setting up headquarters at Fort Mont-Valérien near Paris in late 2025. A likely French contribution of land forces would be one brigade, "including two heavy armoured battlegroups". In the absence of a ceasefire, French air force contributions, such as a group of 16 combat aircraft, an airborne early warning and control aircraft, two aerial refueling aircraft, and a long-range anti-aircraft system, was proposed by researchers David Cadier and Elie Tenenbaum as a viable French air force contribution. If Turkish authorities agreed, Cadier and Tenenbaum expected that France could supply two frigates and a support ship on a one-month time scale.

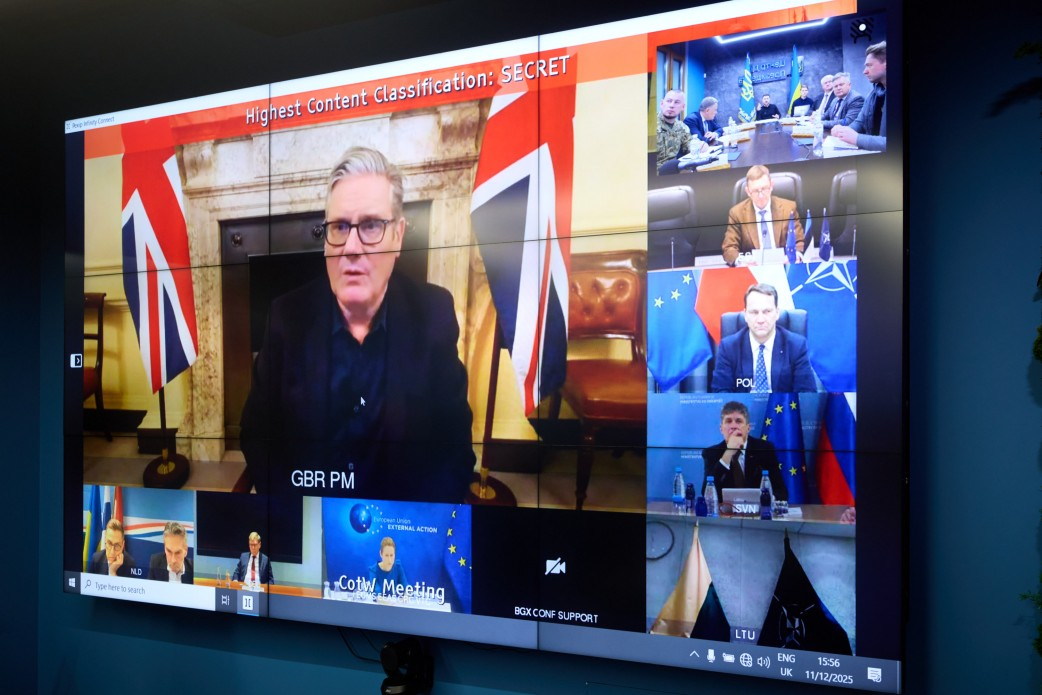
British prime minister Keir Starmer (top left) co-chairs virtual summit of the coalition of the willing on 11 December 2025

In November 2025, Royal United Services Institute (RUSI) researcher Ed Arnold predicted a likely sustainable minimum British contribution of three brigades of about 5000 soldiers each, with one in theatre, one training, and one recovering, and "a lion's share [of] command and control". If the contribution in soldiers were to be long-term, then it would weaken British commitments to NATO.

=== Proposed minor components ===
Minor contributions to the force were expected from Canada, several European countries, and possibly Turkey.

As of November 2025, Canadian politicians and the wider public were politically supportive of increased military support for Ukraine. The specific military resources of the Canadian Armed Forces available for the proposed multinational force were expected to be modest levels of mostly non‑combat functions such as training, demining, logistics, medical and intelligence support, and a few aircraft and ships.

In November 2025, agreement by the Belgian Federal Parliament for a Belgian Armed Forces contribution to the force was unclear due to the wide nature of the De Wever governmental coalition. A likely contribution was predicted by researchers to be a "handful" of F‑16 fighter jets. The shift to a government led by ANO following the October 2025 Czech parliamentary election made it unlikely that Czech forces would contribute to the proposed multinational force in Ukraine. Political and popular support for Ukrainian defence against the Russian in general, and for the creation of a multinational security force in particular, were strong in 2025. Practical possibilities of providing military forces were likely to be high per capita, but low in absolute terms, except if existing deployments such as Danish NATO deployments in Latvia were replaced by other forces. Contributions of staff to multinational units, such as military police, bomb disposal specialists, special forces, or other ancillary staff, were seen as viable as of November 2025.

In April 2025, the Estonian defence minister Hanno Pevkur stated that Estonia was ready to provide a company of soldiers to a multinational peacekeeping force in Ukraine. In November 2025, Estonian support for a multinational force, conditional on a ceasefire, was seen as likely to be strong from the Estonian parliament. It would require a well-defined mission, including the mission's plan's for closure. In 2025, the Estonian public was in the majority (60%) opposed to contributing Estonian soldiers to the proposed force in Ukraine. As a state bordering Russia, it appeared in November 2025 that Finland would likely contribute little to a multinational force in Ukraine, since the benefit for deterrence would be unclear. Finland was seen as "committed to participating in some form", depending on the overall security context and operational plans. In late 2025, Latvian public opinion was in the majority opposed to sending Latvian soldiers for a multinational force in Ukraine. Political and military leaders expected to provide training for Ukrainian soldiers, that they would prefer to be in a mission coordinated by NATO. In late 2025, Lithuanian public opinion was in the majority opposed to sending Lithuanian soldiers for a multinational force in Ukraine. In early December 2025, possible Lithuanian support included the sending of twenty instructors to the multinational force, "targeted deployment of small high-readiness units", and financial support.

As of early December 2025, contributions from The Netherlands to a multinational force in Ukraine appeared to be possible, but unlikely. In November 2025, possible Norwegian contributions to a multinational force included extending air police contributions to Ukrainian territory, shifting Camp Jomsborg east into Ukraine, or providing sea contributions such as minesweepers. As of late November, Swedish Air Force contributions such as air surveillance were suggested by the prime minister of Sweden. Naval contributions on inland waterways, were considered possible. Land force contributions would likely be limited to training, logistics support and demining.

Turkey, which has a naval role in the Black Sea under the Montreux Convention, and carried out mine-clearing operations in the Black Sea during the Russian invasion, is seen as a likely contributor to a multinational peacekeeping force. As of November 2025, Turkey was considering providing members of the Turkey Armed Forces as peacekeepers in the proposed multinational force, but only after a ceasefire between Russia and Ukraine.

=== United States ===
According to April and August 2025 proposals by the Trump administration, a European peacekeeping force in Ukraine would not have a US component.

== Training exercises ==
On 9 November 2026, a training exercise of Multinational Force-Ukraine, called Koalicja 26.2 (English: Coalition 26.2), started in Nowa Dęba in Poland, for a planned two-week duration. The exercise included 2800 people from Belgium, Estonia, France, Germany, Lithuania, the Netherlands, Spain, Sweden, and the UK, together with Polish support and online Turkish participation. The land part of the exercise was managed by the French 1st Armored Division. The exercise including logistics, command-and-control, fighter jets, an aerial refueling tanker, surveillance drones, responses to drone attacks, and trench warfare.

== Ukraine: willingness and preferences ==
In July 2025, Ukrainian authorities were prepared to issue formal invitations for the proposed multinational force. In December 2025, due to the change in the forms of physical combat since the February 2022 full-scale Russian invasion, proposals for a ground-based multinational force in a combat role were viewed sceptically in Ukraine. The provision of technologically advanced aircraft, including 4.5-generation or fifth-generation fighters for destroying Russian guided-bomb carriers, or for complementary, non-combat, rear support, such as repair, logistics and medical aid already provided in Poland, were seen as contributions that would be useful. On 14 December, Zelenskyy stated that "security guarantees" for Ukraine would have to be "legally binding and supported by the US Congress" in order for Ukraine to accept not to join NATO.

== Russian opposition to a European peacekeeping force ==
In March 2025, French president Emmanuel Macron stated that deploying the multinational force in Ukraine would not require Russian agreement, since it would be Ukraine's sovereign right to decide. In September, Russian foreign ministry spokesperson Maria Zakharova stated that the deployment of the force in Ukraine would be "fundamentally unacceptable" and would be a "security-undermining foreign intervention in Ukraine in any form, in any format". In late November, The Guardian interpreted the mid-November 2025 28-point plan as "explicitly bann[ing]" the possible "deployment of western troops to Ukraine". On 15 July 2026, Zakharova again stated that "the deployment of any military contingents from countries of the so-called 'coalition of the willing' to Ukraine [would be] unacceptable to [Russia]" and that the deployment "would amount, de facto, to foreign intervention and an escalation of threats to Russia's security" that would be seen as "legitimate military targets."

== Analysis ==
Max Bergmann of the Center for Strategic and International Studies stated that the deployment of the force would be a de facto implementation of Article 5 of the North Atlantic Treaty. Bergmann argued that the likely lack of US support would make deployment of the proposed force too risky, since it would risk a war between European forces without US backing against Russian forces.

Researchers John Karlsrud of the Norwegian Institute of International Affairs (NUPI) and Yf Reykers of Maastricht University stated that they expected that the proposed force would be primarily led by the UK and France, with logistic support in Poland, as a land, sea and air force. They saw competing military resource needs for countries contributing to the force: "maintaining national defence readiness, preserving NATO's strategic reserve, sustaining troops deployments on NATO's eastern flank, and contributing to a Multinational Force Ukraine".

== See also ==
- Coalition of the willing (Russo-Ukrainian war)
- European Union Advisory Mission Ukraine
- European Union Military Assistance Mission in support of Ukraine
- List of non-United Nations peacekeeping missions
