= 2025 London Summit on Ukraine =

Summit of 16 states, EU and NATO

2025 London Summit on Ukraine Securing Our Future London Summit, 2 March 2025
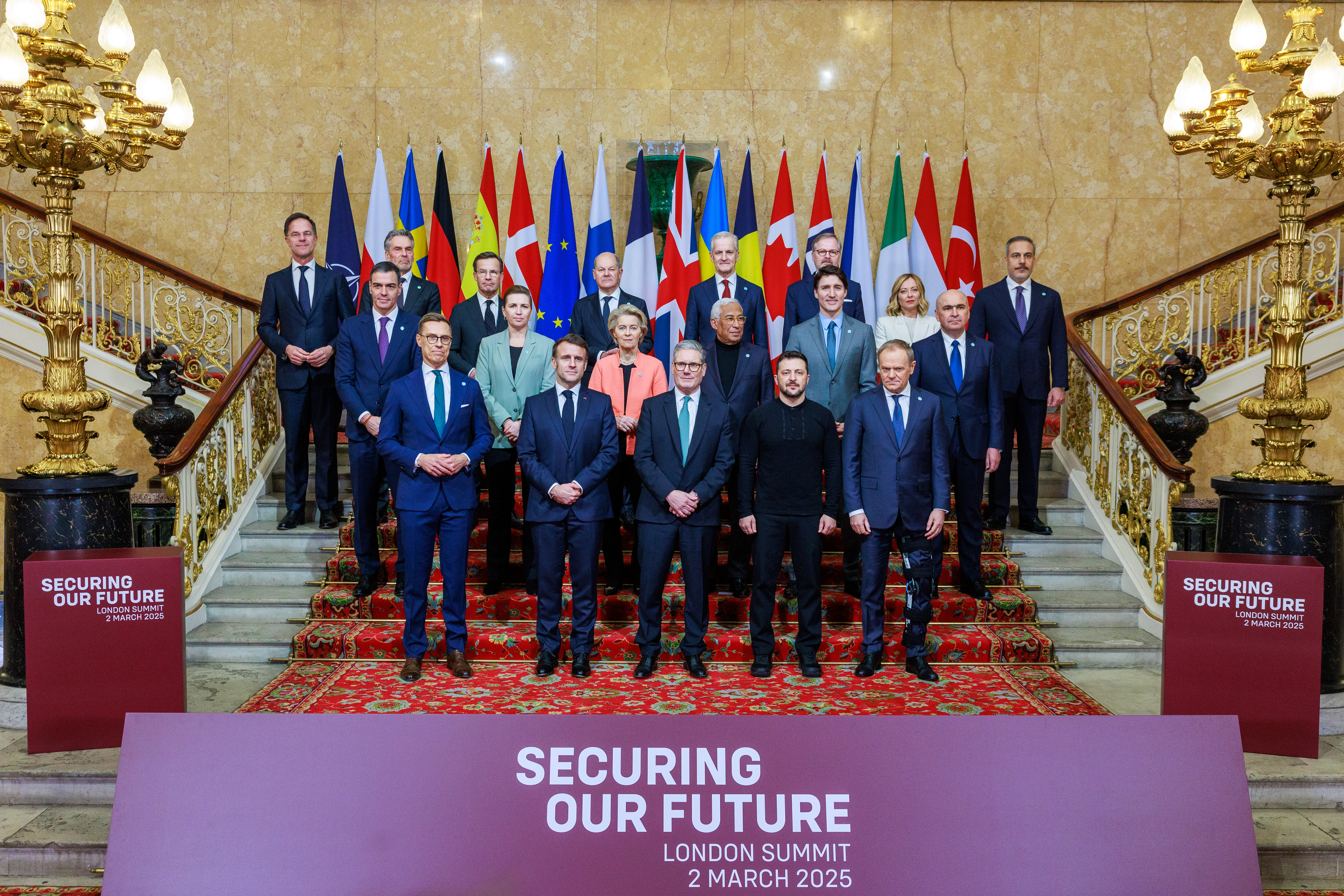
- Host country: United Kingdom
- Date: 2 March 2025
- Motto: Securing our future
- Cities: London
- Venues: Lancaster House
- Participants: 16 states, EU and NATO
- Chair: Keir Starmer, Prime Minister of the United Kingdom

The 2025 London Summit on Ukraine, officially entitled the Securing Our Future London Summit, 2 March 2025, was a meeting of international leaders in London on 2 March 2025, called by British Prime Minister Keir Starmer to draft a peace plan for the Russian invasion of Ukraine to take to the United States.

The summit followed the meeting of Ukrainian President Volodymyr Zelenskyy at the White House in Washington on 28 February 2025 with United States President Donald Trump and Vice President JD Vance.

== Aim ==
The objective of the meeting was to create a "coalition of the willing" in Europe that would be able to present a peace plan for Ukraine. The stated aim of the initiative is to facilitate the peace negotiation attempts launched and mediated by the United States between Ukraine and Russia in February 2025, by helping to build up strong enough security guarantees for Ukraine to ensure that a potential reached ceasefire or peace deal would be lasting. Besides serving the role as building up a potential peacekeeping force, the coalition have also expressed readiness to increase military support for Ukraine and strengthen economic sanctions against Russia, in the event that the ongoing negotiations for a "comprehensive ceasefire" or "peace deal" would fail. As of 20 March 2025, the exact shape and function of the coalition was described as still being subject to ongoing planning, but moved into an "operational phase".

== Participants ==
According to the French newspaper Le Monde, the participants included, along with Ukrainian President Volodymyr Zelenskyy, a number of European and international leaders.

Country	Represented by	Title
Canada	Justin Trudeau	Prime Minister
Czech Republic	Petr Fiala	Prime Minister
Denmark	Mette Frederiksen	Prime Minister
Finland	Alexander Stubb	President
France	Emmanuel Macron	President
Germany	Olaf Scholz	Chancellor
Italy	Giorgia Meloni	Prime Minister
Netherlands	Dick Schoof	Prime Minister
Norway	Jonas Gahr Støre	Prime Minister
Poland	Donald Tusk	Prime Minister
Romania	Ilie Bolojan	Interim President
Spain	Pedro Sánchez	Prime Minister
Sweden	Ulf Kristersson	Prime Minister
Turkey	Hakan Fidan	Minister of Foreign Affairs
Ukraine	Volodymyr Zelenskyy	President
United Kingdom	Keir Starmer (host)	Prime Minister

The following people also attended the meeting:

Organisation	Represented by	Title
European Union	Antonio Costa; Ursula von der Leyen	President of the European Council; President of the European Commission
NATO	Mark Rutte	Secretary general of NATO

Additionally, Starmer spoke to President Alar Karis of Estonia, Prime Minister Evika Siliņa of Latvia and President Gitanas Nausėda of Lithuania by telephone prior to the meeting commencing.

Defence expenditure as % of GDP, 2021 vs. 2024 (NATO and SIPRI)* US did not participate in the summit (a coalition partner country) Source
Country	NATO 2021	NATO 2024	SIPRI 2024
Poland	2.22	4.12	4.2
Finland	1.40	2.41	2.3
Denmark	1.30	2.37	2.02
United Kingdom	2.29	2.33	2.28
Romania	0.85	2.25	2.3
Norway	1.00	2.20	2.09
Sweden	1.42	2.20	2.0
Germany	1.45	2.12	1.9
Czech Republic	1.39	2.10	1.92
Türkiye	1.61	2.10	1.92
France	1.91	2.06	2.05
Netherlands	1.36	2.05	2.0
Italy	1.49	1.54	1.61
Canada	1.27	1.37	1.31
Spain	1.03	1.28	1.28
NATO Europe + Canada	1.66	2.02	–
NATO Total (incl. US)	2.63	2.71	–
United States	3.53	3.38	3.5

Sources:

- NATO (28 August 2025). "Defence Expenditure of NATO Countries (2014–2025)" (PDF). NATO.
- Xiao Liang; Nan Tian; Diego Lopes da Silva; Lorenzo Scarazzato; Zubaida A. Karim; Jade Guiberteau Ricard (April 2025). "Trends in World Military Expenditure, 2024" (PDF). SIPRI.

Note: NATO figures are based on national reporting to the Alliance and include NATO‑specific aggregates (Europe + Canada, NATO total). SIPRI figures are calculated using a consistent global methodology (calendar year, constant USD) and do not provide NATO aggregates. Minor discrepancies between NATO and SIPRI values reflect differences in GDP definitions, exchange rates, and reporting bases.

== Outcomes ==
=== Four point-plan ===
In a press conference that followed the London summit, Starmer outlined four key outcomes:

1. Commitment to maintaining the flow of military aid to Ukraine while increasing economic pressure on Russia through sanctions and other measures
2. Affirming that any lasting peace agreement must ensure the sovereignty and security of Ukraine, with Ukraine being present at all peace negotiations
3. Pledging to enhance Ukraine's defensive military capabilities following any peace deal to deter potential future invasions
4. Development of a "coalition of the willing" consisting of multiple nations prepared to defend the terms of any peace agreement and guarantee Ukraine's security afterward

=== Commitments ===
As part of the announcement, Starmer committed £1.6 billion (€1.94 billion) in UK export finances to purchase more than 5,000 air defense missiles for Ukraine. The missiles will be manufactured in Belfast in Northern Ireland. This complemented a previously announced £2.2 billion (€2.42 billion) loan for military aid to Ukraine backed by frozen Russian assets.

Starmer emphasized that European nations would need to take primary responsibility for the initiative and "do the heavy lifting" and that the agreement would require US backing and Russian involvement. He indicated that the United Kingdom would back its security commitments with "boots on the ground, and planes in the air," regarding the possibility of UK and EU direct military presence in Ukraine to carry out a peace enforcement operation.

President of the European Commission Ursula von der Leyen emphasized the "urgent need to re-arm Europe," to support such security guarantees after "a long time of underinvestment". She suggested that the European Union might need to ease its fiscal rules regarding national debt to facilitate increased defense spending by member states. On 4 March 2025, Von der Leyen announced the EU's €800 billion ($840 billion) defence investment plan "ReArm Europe".

Secretary General of NATO Mark Rutte echoed this sentiment, noting that the meeting demonstrated European nations "stepping up" to ensure Ukraine has the resources necessary to "stay in the fight as long as it has to continue".

Right after the meeting, Finland's president Stubb said that Norway and Finland are working in support of the drafting of the UK-France-Ukraine peace plan. In addition, he said that the role of the countries that are Russia's neighbours will be different from providing peacekeeping troops.

== See also ==
- 2020s European re-armament
- Peace negotiations in the Russian invasion of Ukraine
- 4th European Political Community Summit
