= 6th European Political Community Summit =

European Political Community Summit

6th European Political Community Summit Samiti i Gjashtë i Komunitetit Politik Evropian
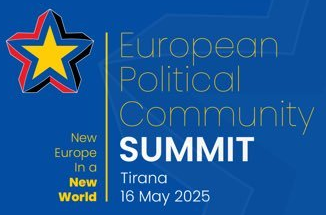

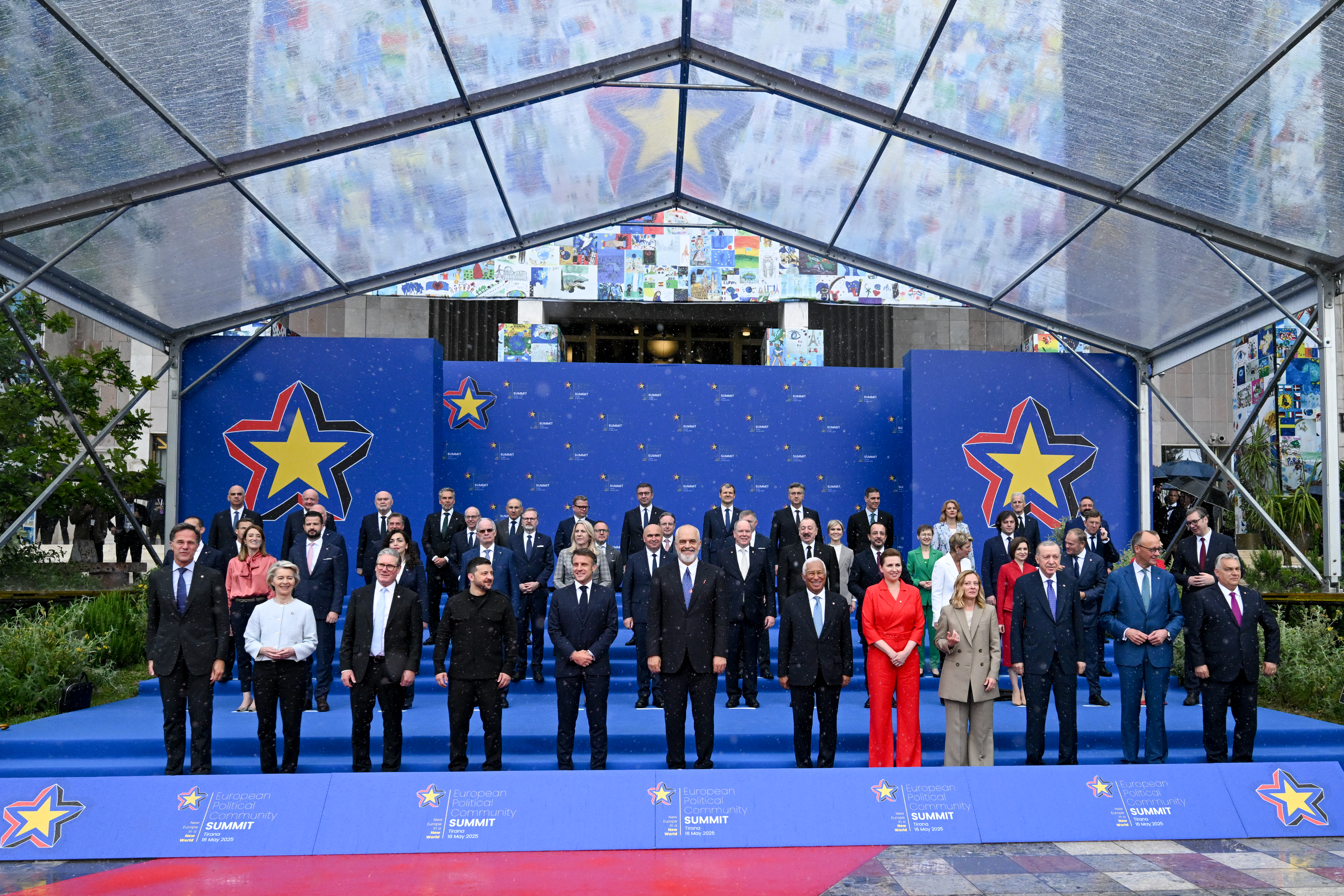
- European leaders at the 6th European Political Community Summit
- Host country: Albania
- Date: 16 May 2025
- Motto: A New Europe in a New World: Unity – Cooperation – Joint Action
- Cities: Tirana
- Venues: Skanderbeg Square
- Participants: 45 countries
- Chair: Edi Rama, Prime Minister of Albania
- Follows: 5th
- Precedes: 7th
- Website: epctiranasummit.al

The Sixth European Political Community Summit was a meeting of the European Political Community held on 16 May 2025 in Albania.

== Background ==
The European Political Community (EPC) was founded as an intergovernmental platform aimed at facilitating political and economic coordination among European states, with a principal objective on strengthening cooperation in areas such as security, economic stability, and democratic governance. The platform emerged in response to the increasing geopolitical instability heightened by the Russian invasion of Ukraine, and was proposed by French President Emmanuel Macron in May 2022. It was planned as a flexible, inclusive framework that would enable both EU members and non-EU members, including the United Kingdom, the Western Balkans, to engage in collaborative dialogue, without the requirement of EU membership.

Albania was announced as the host of the sixth summit of the European Political Community by British Prime Minister Keir Starmer during the closing press conference of the fourth summit held in the United Kingdom in July 2024.

In December 2024, it was announced that the summit would take place on 16 May 2025.

== Aims ==
The summit is to focus on four strategic topics:

- Democratic security and stability, with an emphasis on support for Ukraine and protection from foreign interference.
- Competitiveness and economic security, through innovation, energy transition and industrial sustainability.
- Migration, mobility and youth, addressing the challenges and potential of the young European generation in the digital age.
- European leadership in a new world, where a clearer vision and determination to act in the international arena are expected.

== Schedule and agenda ==
The summit is to be held on Friday 16 May 2025. Three thematic round table meetings are to be held focusing on Europe’s security and democratic resilience; competitiveness and economic security; and mobility challenges and youth empowerment.

The schedule and agenda was as follows:

- 10:00: Arrivals and doorsteps
- 11:00: Opening ceremony
- 11:30: Family photo
- 11:45: First plenary session
- 13:00: Official lunch
- 14:30: Thematic roundtables
- 15:45: Bilateral meetings between heads of delegations
- 17:30: Closing plenary session
- 18:30: Joint press conference with the prime ministers of Albania and Denmark

== Attendees ==
Countries participating in the European Political Community

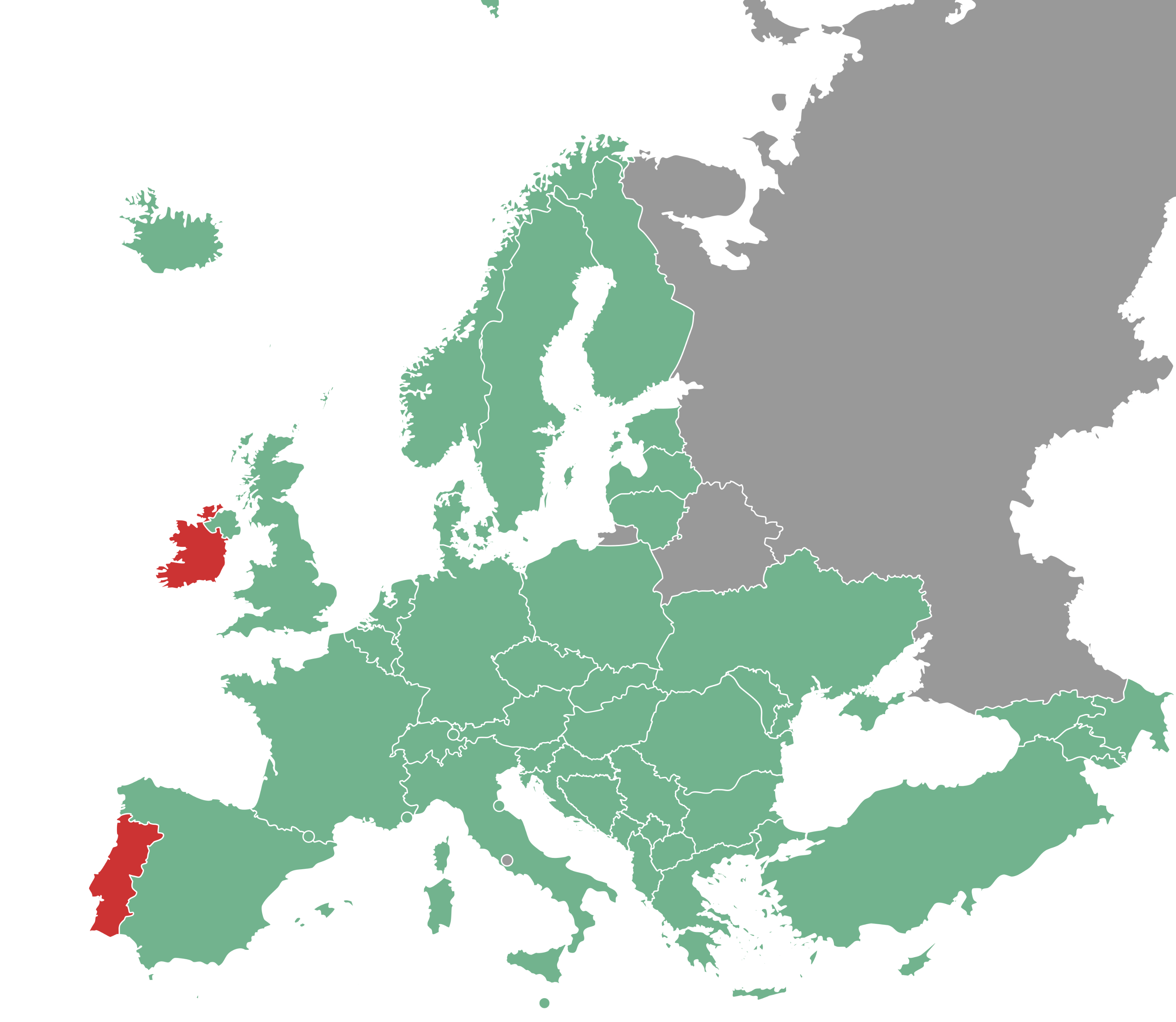
Countries participating in the event

The summit was expected to be attended by the heads of state or government of the states participating in the European Political Community along with the president of the European Council, the president of the European Commission and the president of the European Parliament.

Key
Absent

Member		Represented by	Title
(Albania)	Albania	Edi Rama	Prime Minister
(Andorra)	Andorra	Xavier Espot Zamora	Prime Minister
(Armenia)	Armenia	Nikol Pashinyan	Prime Minister
(Austria)	Austria	Christian Stocker	Chancellor
(Azerbaijan)	Azerbaijan	Ilham Aliyev	President
(Belgium)	Belgium	Bart De Wever	Prime Minister
(Bosnia and Herzegovina)	Bosnia and Herzegovina	Željka Cvijanović	Chairwoman of the Presidency
(Bulgaria)	Bulgaria	Rosen Zhelyazkov	Prime Minister
(Croatia)	Croatia	Andrej Plenković	Prime Minister
(Cyprus)	Cyprus	Nikos Christodoulides	President
(Czech Republic)	Czech Republic	Petr Fiala	Prime Minister
(Denmark)	Denmark	Mette Frederiksen	Prime Minister
(Estonia)	Estonia	Kristen Michal	Prime Minister
(European Union)	European Union	Kaja Kallas	High Representative of the Union for Foreign Affairs and Security Policy
(European Union)	European Union	António Costa	President of the European Council
(European Union)	European Union	Ursula von der Leyen	President of the European Commission
(European Union)	European Union	Roberta Metsola	President of the European Parliament
(Finland)	Finland	Petteri Orpo	Prime Minister
(France)	France	Emmanuel Macron	President
(Georgia (country))	Georgia	Irakli Kobakhidze	Prime Minister
(Germany)	Germany	Friedrich Merz	Chancellor
(Greece)	Greece	Konstantinos Tasoulas	President
(Hungary)	Hungary	Viktor Orbán	Prime Minister
(Iceland)	Iceland	Kristrún Frostadóttir	Prime Minister
(Republic of Ireland)	Ireland		
(Italy)	Italy	Giorgia Meloni	Prime Minister
(Kosovo)	Kosovo	Vjosa Osmani	President
(Latvia)	Latvia	Evika Siliņa	Prime Minister
(Liechtenstein)	Liechtenstein	Brigitte Haas	Prime Minister
(Lithuania)	Lithuania	Gitanas Nausėda	President
(Luxembourg)	Luxembourg	Luc Frieden	Prime Minister
(Malta)	Malta	Robert Abela	Prime Minister
(Moldova)	Moldova	Maia Sandu	President
(Monaco)	Monaco	Albert II	Sovereign Prince
(Montenegro)	Montenegro	Jakov Milatović	President
(Netherlands)	Netherlands	Dick Schoof	Prime Minister
(North Macedonia)	North Macedonia	Hristijan Mickoski	Prime Minister
(Norway)	Norway	Jonas Gahr Støre	Prime Minister
(Poland)	Poland	Donald Tusk	Prime Minister
(Portugal)	Portugal		
(Romania)	Romania	Ilie Bolojan	Acting President
(San Marino)	San Marino	Luca Beccari	Secretary of State for Foreign and Political Affairs
(Serbia)	Serbia	Aleksandar Vučić	President
(Slovakia)	Slovakia	Robert Fico	Prime Minister
(Slovenia)	Slovenia	Robert Golob	Prime Minister
(Spain)	Spain	Pedro Sánchez	Prime Minister
(Sweden)	Sweden	Ulf Kristersson	Prime Minister
(Switzerland)	Switzerland	Karin Keller-Sutter	President
(Turkey)	Turkey	Recep Tayyip Erdoğan	President
(Ukraine)	Ukraine	Volodymyr Zelenskyy	President
(United Kingdom)	United Kingdom	Keir Starmer	Prime Minister

=== Invited delegates ===
The Parliamentary Assembly of the Council of Europe passed a resolution in March 2025 encouraging host countries to ensure that the Council of Europe systematically participates in future EPC summits. The Secretaries-General of the Council of Europe, Organization for Security and Co-operation in Europe and the North Atlantic Treaty Organization were invited to attend the summit.

Entity		Represented by	Title
(NATO)	North Atlantic Treaty Organization	Mark Rutte	Secretary General
(Council of Europe)	Council of Europe	Alain Berset	Secretary General
(Organization for Security and Co-operation in Europe)	Organization for Security and Co-operation in Europe	Feridun Hadi Sinirlioğlu	Secretary-General
	United Transitional Cabinet of Belarus	Sviatlana Tsikhanouskaya	Head

== Outcomes ==
=== European Union–United Kingdom relations ===
British Prime Minister Keir Starmer held talks with EU leaders to finalise a reset of post-Brexit relations ahead of a EU–UK summit on 19 May in London; Both sides remain locked in discussions over fisheries, youth mobility or Erasmus+ membership, student access, and a new agrifood trade deal. Meetings were held on the fringes of the summit with President Macron and Von de Leyen, though no immediate breakthroughs occurred, discussions continued at the first EU-UK summit on 19 May 2025.

== See also ==
- European integration
- Pan-European identity
- Politics of Europe
