= Coalition of the willing (Russo-Ukrainian war) =

Group of countries in support of Ukrainian sovereignty

Coalition of the Willing (CoW) Coalition des Volontaires (CdV, French)
- Multinational Force–Ukraine (MNF–U); Force multinationale en Ukraine (FMN–U) Багатонаціональні сили-Україна (Ukrainian)
- Coalition allies as of 2 December 2025 (Note: Albania is to be highlighted as 34th participant) Non-participating NATO member states (Note: Malta is to be highlighted as EU non-participant state) Opposing belligerents Russia, Belarus, North Korea Planned role Peacekeeping, post-war stabilization
- Other name: MNF — U / MFU (Note: Attested in Ukrainian Serbian, Finnish sources.) • Deterrence / Reassurance force
- Founder: Sixteen nations, 2 organizations: 2 Commonwealth realms • 12 EU states • Turkey • Ukraine • EU (EC/EUCO) • NATO
- Leaders: Andy Burnham; Emmanuel Macron; Volodymyr Zelensky; Friedrich Merz
- Founded: March 2, 2025, London
- Group: Working group: Ukraine security guarantees
- Headquarters: FRA Paris; GBR London; Kyiv UKR CHQ (Note: Coordination headquarters, set upon MNF–U deployment, headed by a UK 2-star general officer. HQs are on 12-months rotation.)
- Status: CoW regularly convenes; MNF-U not mandated as of December 2025

The coalition of the willing (CoW) is a coalition of 40 countries that have pledged strengthened support for Ukraine against Russian aggression, going further than the support delivered by the Ukraine Defense Contact Group by pledging readiness to be part of a peacekeeping force deployed on Ukrainian territory, either by providing troops or contributing in other ways. The peacekeeping force is envisaged to be deployed only the moment Ukraine and Russia sign a "comprehensive ceasefire agreement" or "peace deal" to settle the ongoing Russo-Ukrainian War. The initiative, led by the United Kingdom and France, was announced by British Prime Minister Keir Starmer on 2 March 2025, following the 2025 London Summit on Ukraine under the motto "securing our future".

The stated aim of the initiative is to facilitate the peace negotiation attempts launched and mediated by the United States between Ukraine and Russia in February 2025, by helping to build strong enough security guarantees for Ukraine to ensure that a potential reached ceasefire or peace deal would be lasting. Besides building a potential peacekeeping force, the coalition have expressed readiness to increase military support for Ukraine and strengthen economic sanctions against Russia in the event that the ongoing negotiations for a "comprehensive ceasefire" or "peace deal" fail. As of 20 March 2025, its exact shape and function was still being planned, but the coalition was moving into an "operational phase".

== Background and chronology ==
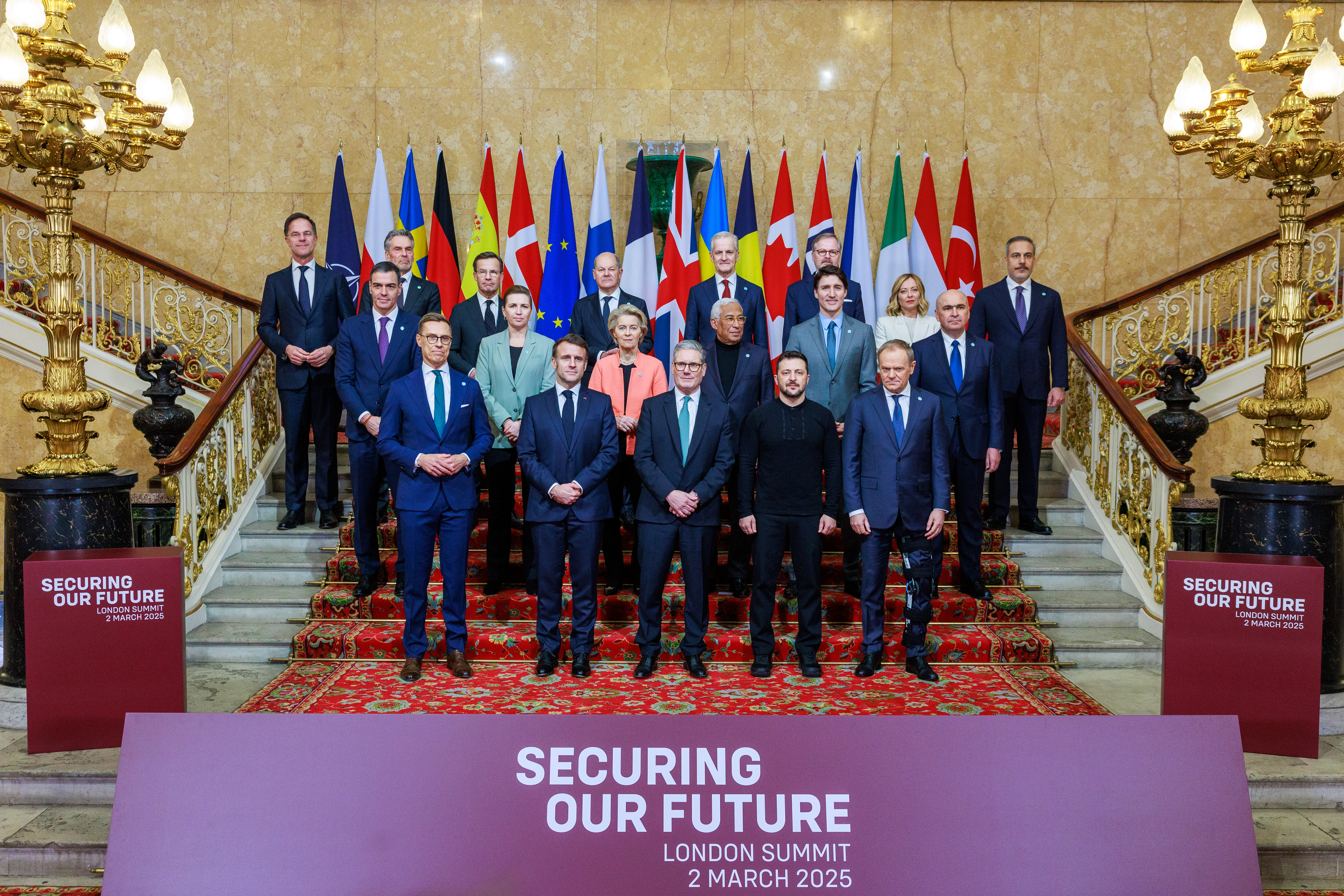
Participants at the 2 March 2025 London Summit on Ukraine

According to a report from Le Monde, in late November 2024 Paris and London were discussing taking the lead in a coalition to be deployed in Ukraine, on terms not then defined. This was in light of Trump's return to the White House and the prospect of American disengagement from Kyiv. The option of sending troops to Ukraine, the debate on which French President Emmanuel Macron had launched at a meeting of Kyiv's allies in Paris in February 2024, was strongly opposed by some European countries, led by Germany. This scenario had not been buried however and was revived during the visit of British Prime Minister, Keir Starmer to France for the 11 November Armistice Day ceremonies. On 1 March 2025, Czech president Petr Pavel made a social media post on X, calling for the formation of a coalition of the willing to end the Russo-Ukrainian war.

=== March–August 2025 ===
Building upon these bilateral discussions aiming at creating a hard core of allies in Europe focused on Ukraine and wider European security, Starmer hosted, on 2 March 2025, the London Summit on Ukraine with Macron, Ukrainian president Zelenskyy and sixteen other world leaders, in order to coordinate support for Ukraine. Starmer characterised the meeting as addressing a "once-in-a-generation moment" for European security, stating that the time had come for decisive action rather than continued deliberation, and officially announced Britain and France would lead a European "coalition of the willing" to provide security guarantees to Ukraine and enable peace negotiations with Russia. The announcement came two days after a meeting between Zelenskyy and United States President Trump with Vice President Vance at the White House on 28 February.

On 11 March 2025, the military chiefs of staff of 30 European and Commonwealth nations, as well as Japan, met in Paris for talks on the creation of an international security force for Ukraine to maintain peace should a ceasefire come into effect. On 15 March, Starmer held a virtual meeting with leaders from European and Commonwealth nations to assemble the "coalition of the willing" to consider options for a "reassurance force" to be deployed within Ukraine to deter renewed Russian attacks against the country should a ceasefire be agreed. The meeting gathered the leaders of 26 countries, including several European countries, Ukraine, Turkey, Canada, Australia, and New Zealand, as well as representatives from the European Commission and NATO.

On 20 March 2025, the exact shape and function of the coalition was described as still being subject to ongoing planning, but moved into an "operational phase" marked by the gathering of a meeting of military officials from 31 countries. No final decisions were announced after the meeting, but some media reported the participants had contemplated that the coalition could have two different designs depending on whether or not it should be deployed to defend a ceasefire agreement or a peace deal. Five military sub-planning groups (land, sea, air, regeneration and reconstruction) will reconvene the military officials from the 31 countries to continue discussions across three intensive planning days from 24 to 26 March at the Northwood Headquarters in England.

The coalition then met again for a third high-level summit in Paris on 27 March, with an agenda to finalise the plans on how the coalition shall be designed and deployed as a military force to ensure that a potential ceasefire will be lasting for Ukraine. The agenda of the summit included drafting and debating a peace treaty proposal written by the coalition, drafting and debating how the coalition can secure a "complete ceasefire" acceptable to Ukraine, bolster aid to Ukraine (with each participating country expected to outline what it is prepared to do), and agreeing on a plan for providing long-term support for the Ukrainian army. The outcome of the meeting was unanimous agreement that:

- No sanctions against Russia could be lifted as part of a temporary ceasefire agreement.
- A potential sanctions relief should instead be conditioned on reaching a peace deal.
- Defense chiefs from Ukraine, France and UK should soon meet in Ukraine to conduct the next stage of the detailed planning for setting up a potential reassurance force (determining the number of soldiers and type of military equipment required to be deployed after a reached peace deal, in order to deter and respond to a subsequently potential renewed Russian aggression).

On 24 April 2025, The Times reported that British officials considered deploying a ground force to defend Ukraine too risky and that the plan was likely to be abandoned, with military trainers deployed to Western Ukraine instead. On 29 April 2025, it reported that Europe "would struggle to put 25,000 troops on the ground in Ukraine". Lithuania's defense minister Dovile Sakaliene reportedly said "Russia has 800,000 [troops]. Let me tell you this, if we can't even raise 64,000 that doesn't look weak – it is weak."

On 17 July 2025, a week after signing Lancaster Declaration with France, the UK, as represented by defence secretary John Healey, provided an update to the House of Commons on the war in Ukraine revealing command structure, components, and supposed name of the coalition force – Multinational Force Ukraine. The name was confirmed on 17 August in the coalition statement. Joined by NATO military chiefs between 19 and 21 August, coalition planners held virtual meetings on Ukraine with focus on security guarantees design.

=== September–November 2025 ===
In September 2025, the Coalition's Multinational Force–Ukraine (MNF-U) established its strategic joint command headquarters in Fort Mont Valerien, Paris, co-led by France and the United Kingdom. This development marked the transition from theoretical planning to operational readiness, creating a structure to oversee the coalition's future non-combat stabilization mission.

After the 4 September Coalition summit in Paris, Macron announced that 26 nations had formally pledged to deploy troops as part of a "reassurance force" committed to roles including air policing, naval mine-clearing, and training, with deployment conditional on a ceasefire. By late October, the United Kingdom confirmed its specific contributions to securing Ukraine's "skies and seas," a commitment formally reiterated in the House of Lords on October 31 by minister of State for Development, FCDO, baroness Jenny Chapman in the ministerial statement.

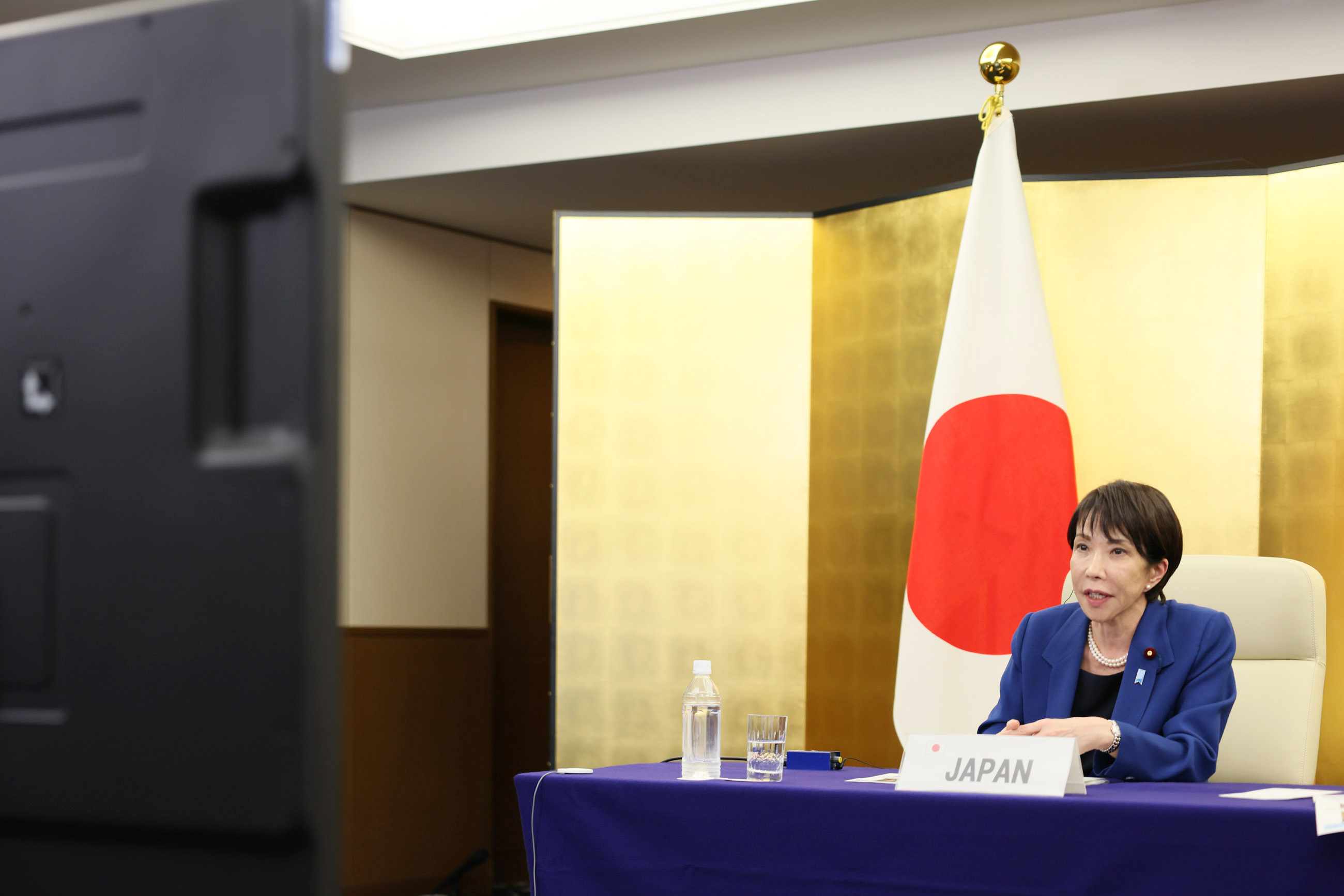
Sanae Takaichi, prime minister of Japan, addresses the 24 October 2025 CoW summit by VTC. Tokyo. Ministry of Foreign Affairs

Diplomatic friction with Russia intensified in November 2025. On November 17, the Paris headquarters was formally inaugurated. In response, Russian President Vladimir Putin demanded an explicit ban on Western military deployments on Ukrainian soil as a precondition for any peace agreement. Diplomatic efforts culminated in late November. Following intense US-Ukrainian talks in Geneva on 23 November, a controversial US-drafted "28-point" peace plan — widely criticized as pro-Russian — was replaced by a revised "19-point proposal" more acceptable to Ukraine. Two days later, on November 25, coalition leaders met to formalize a dedicated working group to align European security guarantees with American diplomatic efforts, joined by US Secretary of State Marco Rubio. The same day, Macron announced the creation of mentioned group to define the technical specifics of the military support. France and the UK subsequently inaugurated this working group to define the final contributions, mandates, and security guarantees of the MNF-U. Its mandate is to determine the specific security guarantees and national contributions for proposed MNF-U, with the participation of the United States and Turkey.

In addition to summits, the coalition has convened its second ministerial (3 September, NATO HQ, Brussels) and first announced directors-level (4 November, Madrid) meetings.

=== December 2025–present ===
As of December 2025, the coalition focused on bridging European "Article 5-style" security commitments and the skepticism regarding their credibility without direct US combat involvement. In a December briefing by European Parliament Research Service, Coalition was suggested as an 'option of last resort' for financing 2026–27 Ukrainian security needs. On 8 December, following a meeting with European leaders in London (of UK, France, Germany, Ukraine; and with the leaders of Italy, Finland, President of the European Commission and Secretary general of NATO participating virtually in the second part of the meeting by video link), president Zelenskyy confirmed that Ukraine and its European partners had prepared a revised 20-point proposal to be shared with the US, stressing that while the talks were "productive," there was still no agreement on ceding any Ukrainian territory, a compromise he stated Kyiv would never accept. The next day, news agencies specified three documents under discussion (the revised 20-point framework proposal for a peace plan, a reconstruction plan for Ukraine to be implemented after a reached ceasfire or peace, and a security guarantee agreement to be agreed between Ukraine, United States and the Coalition of the Willing), with the document about the security guarantees being requested by Ukraine and its European supporters to be 'aligned with the principles of the Coalition of the Willing'.

The 11 December coalition's virtual summit official statements confirmed inviolability of borders principle and ongoing discussions regarding the detailed planning for a proposed European reassurance force as a component of the robust security guarantees being developed. The same day discussions were followed by the online meeting between Ukraine and US part of the working group on security guarantees, and later on by the series of meetings – culminating in the European leaders summit, along with Steven Witkoff, on 15 December 2025 – in Stuttgart and Berlin starting 13 December 2025. Coalition, along the multinational force referred by the New York Times as 'European forces', was mentioned in the press statement of the 15 December European summit.

In June 2026, with a €90 billion loan over two years from the EU for increasing Ukrainian defence, President Zelenskyy said his government will raise military wages and recruit foreign soldiers to counter manpower shortages, however in August 2026, Zelenskyy asked allies for an additional €23 billion of funding for a military spending shortfall.

== High-level meetings ==
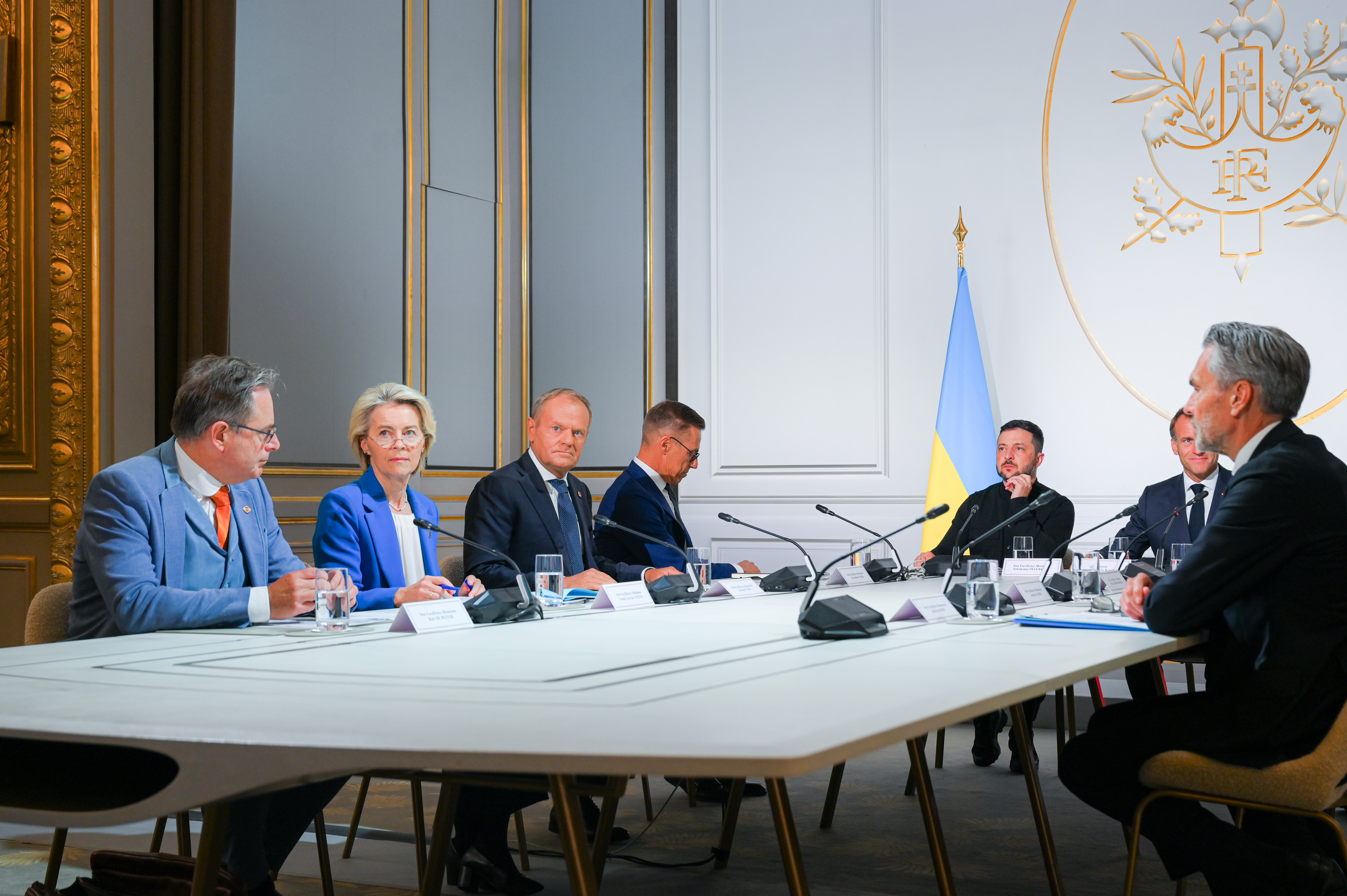
Coalition of the Willing meeting in Paris, France – 4 September 2025

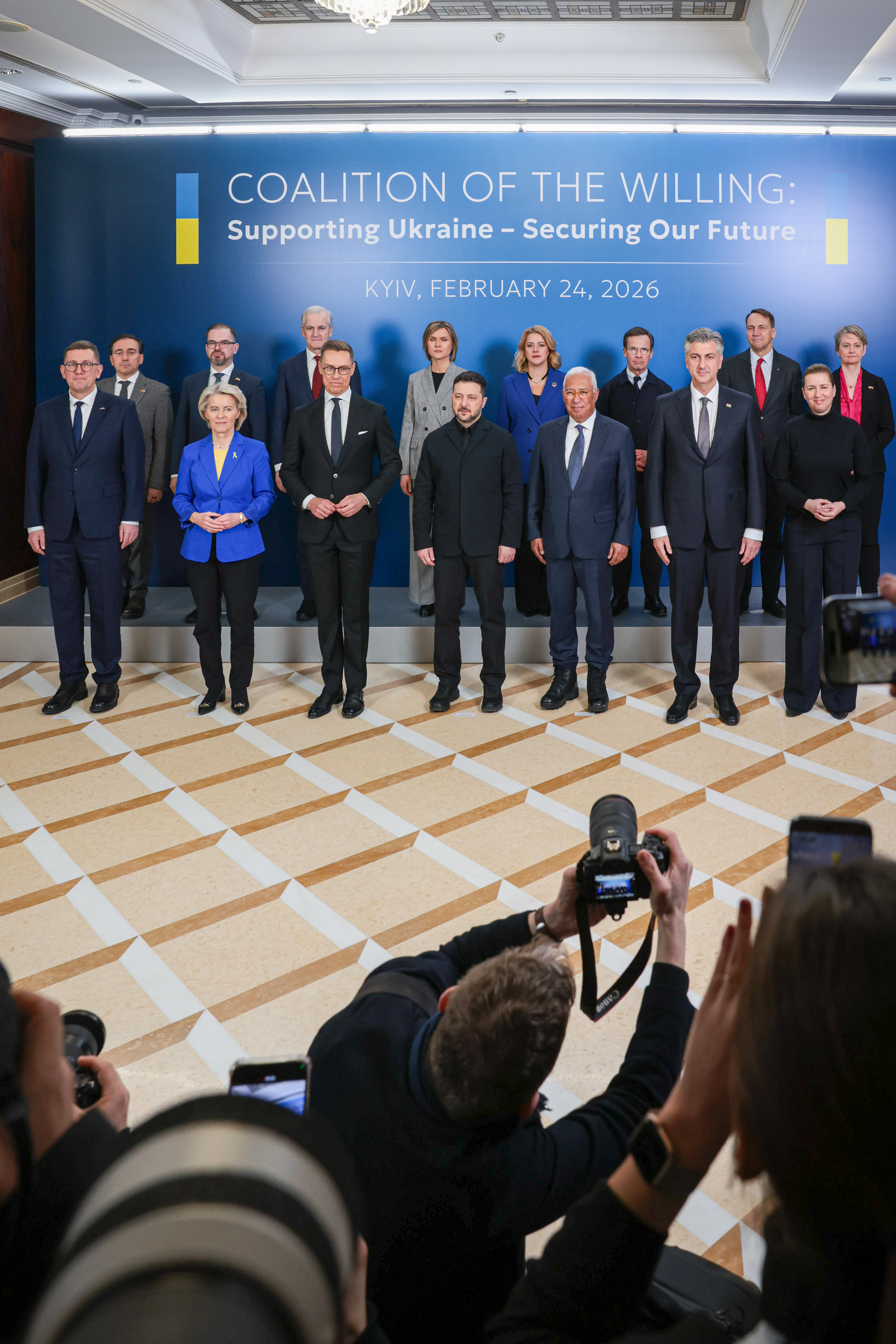
Coalition of the Willing meeting in Kyiv for the 4th anniversary of Ukraine invasion

The coalition format serves as a mechanism to circumvent institutional stalemates, avoiding need for NATO to respond, while having an agility in a new security architecture in Europe. As CoW is not a treaty-based entity, participants membership status has been conferred by representatives attending coalition meetings. From July 2025, France and the UK are constant co-chairs of the summit meetings. As of December 2025, Germany joined the duumvirate twice as the third co-chair.

The coalition so far held the following high-level meetings, in order to help facilitate the peace negotiation attempts aiming to reach a "comprehensive ceasefire agreement" or "peace deal" to settle the Russo-Ukrainian war:

| | Date | Host | Chair | Location | Participating Countries | Ref. |
|---|---|---|---|---|---|---|
| 1 | 2 March 2025 | United Kingdom | Keir Starmer | Lancaster House, London | 16 | |
| 2 | 15 March 2025 | United Kingdom | Keir Starmer | Virtual meeting (Video conference) | 26 | |
| 3 | 27 March 2025 | France | Emmanuel Macron | Élysée Palace, Paris | 31 | |
| 4 | 10 April 2025 | Belgium (ministerial) | John Healey, Sebastien Lecornu | NATO headquarters, Brussels | 31 | |
| 5 | 10 May 2025 | Ukraine | Volodymyr Zelenskyy | Mariinskyi Palace, Kyiv | 32 | |
| 6 | 10 July 2025 | United Kingdom | Keir Starmer | Northwood Headquarters, Eastbury | 32 | |
| 7 | 13 August 2025 | Germany | Friedrich Merz | Hybrid meeting (Video conference and in-person presence) | 35 | |
| 8 | 17 August 2025 | France | Emmanuel Macron | Hybrid meeting (Video conference and in-person presence) | 35 | |
| 9 | 19 August 2025 | France | Emmanuel Macron | Hybrid meeting (Video conference and in-person presence) | 35 | |
| 10 | 3 September 2025 | Belgium (ministerial) | John Healey, Sebastien Lecornu | NATO headquarters, Brussels | 35 | |
| 11 | 4 September 2025 | France | Emmanuel Macron | Élysée Palace, Paris | 35 | |
| 12 | 24 October 2025 | United Kingdom | Keir Starmer | Foreign, Commonwealth and Development Office, Westminster, Greater London | 34 | |
| 13 | 25 November 2025 | France | Emmanuel Macron | Virtual meeting (Video conference) | 35 | |
| 14 | 11 December 2025 | France | Emmanuel Macron | Virtual meeting (Video conference) | 32 | |
| 15 | 6 January 2026 | France | Emmanuel Macron | Élysée Palace, Paris | 35 | |
| 16 | 24 February 2026 | Ukraine | Volodymyr Zelenskyy | Mariinskyi Palace, Kyiv | 35 | |
| 17 | 13 July 2026 | France | Emmanuel Macron | Les Invalides, Paris | 37 | |
| 18 | 19 November 2026 | Germany | Friedrich Merz | Federal Chancellery, Berlin | 40 | |

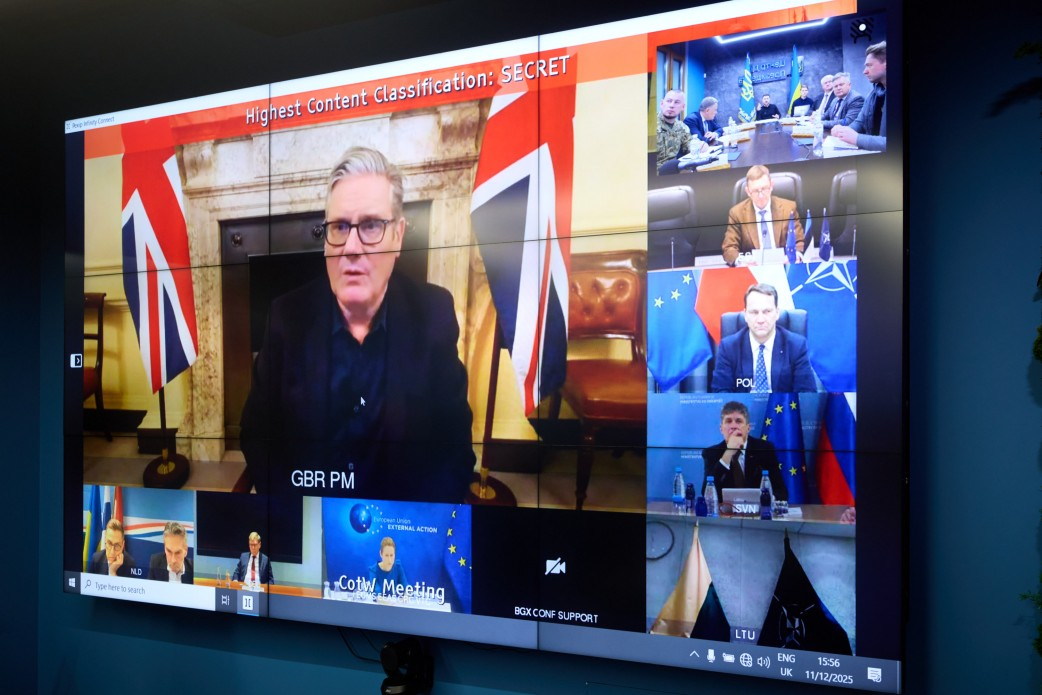
Virtual summit of the coalition 11 December 2025

== Aims ==
The raison d'être of the initiative was created by the peace negotiation attempts launched and mediated by the United States between Ukraine and Russia in February 2025, as those negotiations initially did not present or offer Ukraine any substantial security guarantees to defend a potentially reached peace deal; while it was acknowledged that in order to ensure that a potential peace would be lasting for Ukraine then some stronger security guarantees than the pre-existing 1994 Budapest Memorandum would be needed, and at the same time became clear that the previously considered proposal to offer Ukraine an immediate membership of NATO as a security guarantee could not be realised. Besides serving the role as building up a potential peacekeeping force, the coalition also expressed readiness to increase military support for Ukraine and strengthen economic sanctions against Russia, in the event that the ongoing negotiations for a "comprehensive ceasefire" or "peace deal" would fail.

In a press conference that followed the London summit, Starmer outlined four key components of the coalition's approach:

1. Commitment to maintaining the flow of military aid to Ukraine while increasing economic pressure on Russia through sanctions and other measures.
2. Affirming that any lasting peace agreement must ensure the sovereignty and security of Ukraine, with Ukraine being present at all peace negotiations.
3. Pledging to enhance Ukraine's defensive military capabilities following any peace deal to deter potential future invasions.
4. Development of a "coalition of the willing" consisting of multiple countries prepared to defend the terms of any peace agreement and guarantee Ukraine's security afterwards.

In December 2025, scientists John Karlsrud and Yf Reykers of NUPI characterized the coalition as "a coordinated political effort to strengthen Europe's role in ensuring Ukraine's future sovereignty and security".

=== Commitments ===
Cereals export logistics, Ukraine (excluding oblasts partly occupied by Russia, in light green) Originally published by USDA, June 2025 (Note: Through the Danube ports of Reni and Izmail, and onward to the Port of Constanta in Romania; and via Port of Odesa, Ukraine.)

As part of the announcement, British Prime Minister Starmer committed £1.6 billion (US$2 billion) in UK export finances to purchase more than 5,000 air defence missiles for Ukraine. The missiles will be manufactured in Belfast. This complemented a previously announced £2.2 billion loan for military aid to Ukraine backed by frozen Russian assets. Starmer emphasised that European countries would need to take primary responsibility for the initiative and "do the heavy lifting" and that the agreement would require US backing and Russian involvement. He indicated that the United Kingdom would back its security commitments with "boots on the ground, and planes in the air", regarding the possibility of UK and EU direct military presence in Ukraine to carry out a peace enforcement operation.

President of the European Commission Ursula von der Leyen emphasised the "urgent need to re-arm Europe," to support such security guarantees after "a long time of underinvestment". She suggested that the European Union might need to ease its fiscal rules regarding national debt to facilitate increased defence spending by member states. Secretary General of NATO Rutte echoed this sentiment, noting that the meeting demonstrated European countries "stepping up" to ensure Ukraine has the resources necessary to "stay in the fight as long as it has to continue." Right after the meeting, Finland's president Alexander Stubb said that Norway and Finland are working in support of the drafting of the UK–France–Ukraine peace plan. In addition, he said that the role of the countries that are Russia's neighbours will be different from providing peacekeeping troops.

On 30 April 2025, Estonian Prime Minister Kristen Michal offered to contribute "a company-sized unit (50 to 250 soldiers), including combat troops, instructors, and staff officers" as part of the "coalition of the willing". Portugal has pledged €226 million towards the supply of weapons and military equipment, in addition to training for pilots and drone operators. Denmark has invested in sustainable indigenous Ukrainian production of equipment (the Danish model), made possible through the support of the European Union.

As of 2026, Germany, Italy and Poland have indicated that they will not send troops to Ukraine.

==== International law and peace enforcement framework for Ukraine ====
The legal architecture for the coalition's peacekeeping mission is evolving in the shadow of UN precedent and international law. Deployment is to occur only with a comprehensive, signed ceasefire or peace deal, respecting Ukraine's sovereignty and the norms prohibiting intervention in active conflicts without host-country consent. Rules of engagement, status of forces, and chain of command are being negotiated in detail, taking lessons from previous 'coalitions of the willing'. As of October 2025, lack of specific 'reassurance force in Ukraine' legal analysis highlights the risks of ambiguity in force mandate, especially in the context of 'robust peace enforcement' (as opposed to traditional peacekeeping).

The Multinational Force – Ukraine (Note: The title is the proper name and a common noun phrase. First attested public usage of the acronym is in UK Ministry of Defence answer to a written question. Later in 2025, the attested usage are in the Ukraine's, Serbia's media, in Finnish. French usage is a calque from English, though acronym is not attested. For translation influence on shaping conflicts discourse and information transitioning from local to international press and vice versa see the handbook.) (MNF-U) (Note: French: Force multinationale – Ukraine, Ukrainian: Багатонаціональні сили–Україна, romanized: Bahatonatsionalni syly — Ukraina, lit. 'poly- (many-) /-national/ forces (troops) — Ukraine'. Also known as deterrence (as in Ukrainian: сили стримування, romanized: syly strymuvannia and French: force de dissuasion), stabilization (as in French: force de stabilisation and Ukrainian: стабілізаційні сили, romanized: stabilizatsiyni syly), reassurance force (as in French: force de réassurance). MFU was used as an initialism before MNF-U acronym in usage.) is a proposed non-permanent armed multinational coalition future force, politically led by France and the United Kingdom, designed to deploy to Ukraine only following a comprehensive ceasefire agreement in the aftermath of the Russo-Ukrainian war. Conceived as a rapid deployment force in response to the ceasefire, if comprehensively agreed, it is to operate with English as its working language and under extended multinational agreements. Coalition's expected mandate to support a comprehensive ceasefire and post-war stabilization in Ukraine includes military logistics, training, force generation, naval mine‑clearing, and air policing.

== Membership ==
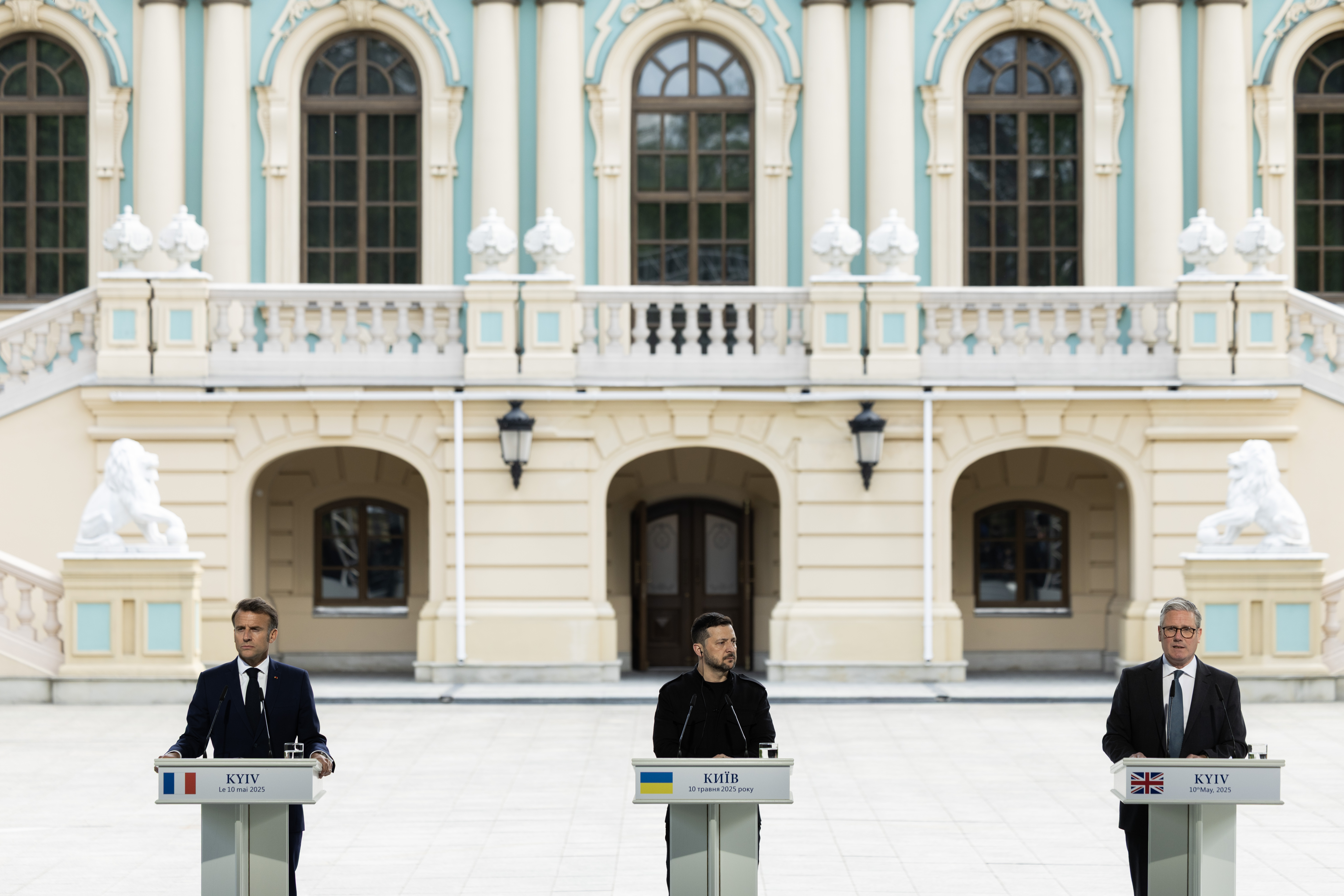
Emmanuel Macron, Volodymyr Zelensky, Keir Starmer (pictured L-R), Friedrich Merz and Donald Tusk (not pictured) at joint press conference. 10 May 2025, Mariinskyi Palace, Kyiv

As of January 2026, the official list of members has not been disclosed. The group consists largely of European and Commonwealth countries. Australia was not represented at the 10 April 2025 meeting. Starmer publicly announced Japan had joined the coalition of the willing on 15 March 2025, however Japan did not join a high-level coalition meeting until 13 August, when Shigeru Ishiba, Prime Minister of Japan, joined the 7th CoW leaders meeting by video conference. He also attended the next two virtual meetings. Despite being represented in the virtual meeting on 15 March, and the 10 May meeting, New Zealand was not represented in subsequent 27 March and 10 April meetings.

At the 19 November 2026 Coalition meeting in Berlin, the following countries were represented:

1. Albania
2. Australia
3. Austria
4. Belgium
5. Canada
6. Croatia
7. Cyprus
8. Czech Republic
9. Denmark
10. Estonia
11. Finland
12. France
13. Georgia
14. Germany
15. Greece
16. Iceland
17. Ireland
18. Italy
19. Japan
20. Latvia
21. Lithuania
22. Luxembourg
23. Moldova
24. Montenegro
25. Netherlands
26. New Zealand
27. North Macedonia
28. Norway
29. Poland
30. Portugal
31. Romania
32. Slovakia
33. Slovenia
34. South Korea
35. Spain
36. Sweden
37. Turkey
38. Ukraine
39. United Kingdom
40. United States

Beside those listed above, Bulgaria's prime minister Rosen Zhelyazkov participated in several previous summits. Besides of representatives from the participating nations, the following people also attended the Coalition meetings:

| Organisation | Represented by | Title |
|---|---|---|
| European Union | Antonio Costa; Ursula von der Leyen | President of the European Council; President of the European Commission |
| NATO | Mark Rutte | Secretary general of NATO |

High Representative of the European Union for Foreign Affairs and Security Policy – Kaja Kallas – took part in some of the summits. Supreme Allied Commander Europe – Alexus Grynkewich also took part in some of the summits. In July 2026 at a summit in Paris, North Macedonia and Moldova joined the coalition. In July 2026, Bulgaria withdrew from the coalition.

The People's Republic of China declared willingness to take part in Ukraine's post-war reconstruction on 18 March 2025, and according to the German newspaper Die Welt, China also contemplated joining the coalition of the willing if being invited on 22 March 2025. The Chinese Foreign Ministry later officially denied reports that China could ever join the coalition, as partaking in a peacekeeping mission in Ukraine spearheaded by European leaders was viewed to conflict with its policy of neutrality in the Russo-Ukrainian war.

== See also ==
- Coalition of the willing – Temporary international partnership for a specific goal
- NATO–Ukraine Council – Organisation established in 2023
- Ukraine Defense Contact Group – Defensive alliance against 2022 Russian invasion of Ukraine
- 2020s European rearmament – Funding and reindustrialisation of European militaries
- NATO Security Assistance and Training for Ukraine
- August 2025 White House multilateral meeting on Ukraine
- Peace negotiations in the Russo-Ukrainian war (2022–present)
