= Foreign policy of the Lee Jae Myung government =

The foreign policy of the Lee Jae Myung government is based on silyong (실용, practical) diplomacy. Kim Jina, the Second Vice Minister of Foreign Affairs, described silyong diplomacy not as merely pursuing practical gains, but as diplomacy that balances values and practical gains, explaining it as "a sophisticated diplomatic strategy that secures sufficient strategic autonomy, manages threats, and seizes opportunities." National Security Advisor Wi Sung-lac said, "South Korea is a country that shares values with the United States and other G7 nations," adding that the basic principle is to establish foreign relations by participating in, aligning with, and consulting with these countries.

== Africa ==
The Korea-Africa Foreign Ministers' Meeting was held in Seoul in June 2026. Representatives, including foreign ministers, from 50 African countries attended, along with the heads of the African Union (AU), the African Development Bank (AfDB), the African Continental Free Trade Area (AfCFTA), and the Africa Centres for Disease Control and Prevention (CDC). The theme was "Korea-Africa Partnership for Joint Response in a Global Transition." President Lee met with chief ministerial representatives from 18 African countries and representatives from two regional international organizations, including the AU, at the presidential Cheong Wa Dae. Lee stated, "I hope the South Korea–Africa Summit becomes a regular event," adding, "I hope that Foreign Ministers' meetings are also held frequently so that we can cooperate on feasible issues facing your respective countries and Korea, and find together what is mutually beneficial."

== Asia ==
=== East Asia ===
==== China ====
President Lee Jae Myung appeared to place greater importance on South Korea–China relations than the predecessor Yoon Suk Yeol. Lee visited China as his first overseas trip of the new year in 2026, visiting Beijing and Shanghai to meet with the country's top three leaders. At a press conference in Shanghai, he referred to China as "the world's largest market and a land of infinite potential," remarking, "Why go far and suffer while leaving that place out?" thereby reiterating his emphasis on pragmatic diplomacy centered on national interests.

At the meeting, Lee and General Secretary of the Chinese Communist Party Xi Jinping agreed to restore strategic dialogue channels in various fields, including diplomacy and national security, to proceed with the second phase of negotiations for the South Korea–China Free Trade Agreement within the year, and to strengthen cultural content exchanges. At the Korea-China Business Forum held earlier, companies from both countries signed 32 memorandums of understanding for joint projects. The forum was attended by over 600 political and business figures from both countries, including President Lee and Chinese Vice Premier He Lifeng.

In November 2026, Lee visited Shenzhen to attend APEC China 2026. Xi and Lee held a meeting, with both leaders marking the 35th anniversary of diplomatic ties. Xi said he was willing to assist in "various efforts aimed at easing tensions on the Korean Peninsula, including a North Korea-U.S. dialogue", while Lee asked China to play "a constructive role" in the Korean Peninsula issues, which he said was a "do or die" matter.

==== Japan ====
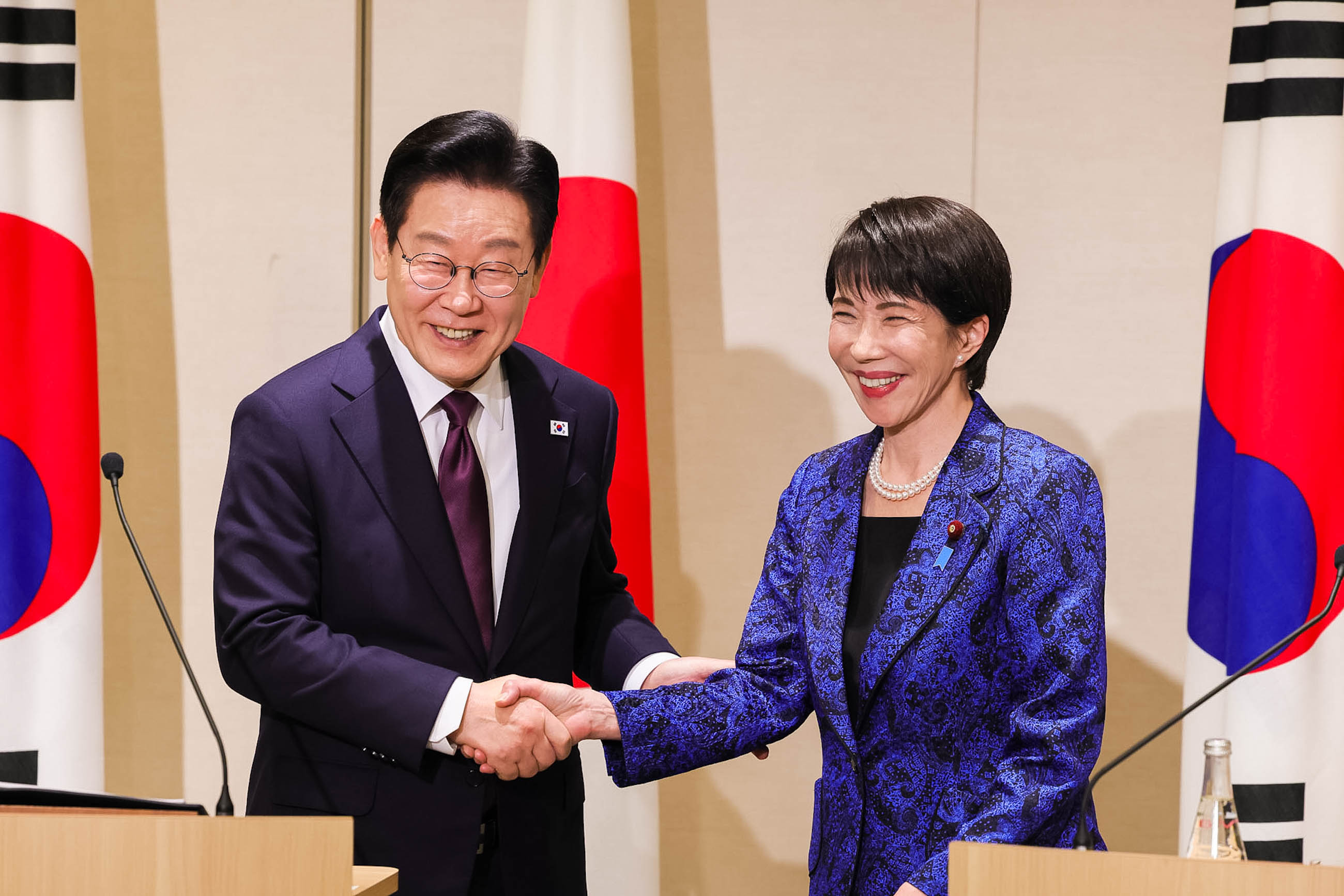
Lee and Japanese PM Sanae Takaichi in Japan, January 2026

The year 2025, when Lee took office, marked the 60th anniversary of the establishment of diplomatic relations were held in Seoul on June 16, hosted by the Japanese Embassy in Korea, and on June 19, hosted by the South Korea Embassy in Japan. In a video message, President Lee stated, "Amidst a rapidly changing international situation, the two countries are important partners who must seek response measures together," adding, "I hope that Korea-Japan relations will continue to develop in a stable and future-oriented direction." Japanese Prime Minister Shigeru Ishiba attended the reception in person.

Lee visited Nara Prefecture, Japan, the constituency and hometown of Japanese Prime Minister Sanae Takaichi, on January 13 and 14, as his second overseas trip of 2026.

==== Mongolia ====
President Lee paid a state visit to Mongolia from July 9 to 11, 2026, becoming the first South Korean president to do so in 15 years since President Lee Myung-bak. During the visit, he held a summit with Mongolian President Ukhnaagiin Khürelsükh and agreed to strengthen cooperation in key minerals, including rare earth elements. Following the summit on the 9th, President Lee announced the conclusion of the Comprehensive Economic Partnership Agreement (CEPA) in principle through a joint declaration; consequently, the 2–5% import tariffs imposed on Mongolian copper, molybdenum, and rare earth elements were immediately abolished. Lee stated, "Building on the CEPA, Korea and Mongolia will join forces to achieve a trade volume of $1 billion by 2030." On this day, President Lee visited Seoul Street in Ulaanbaatar, and interacted with the Mongolian people. After climbing Seouljeong and looking around, he personally purchased and tasted Korean food, such as gimbap and tteokbokki, sold at nearby street stalls. He had dinner at a Korean restaurant run by Mongolian.

=== Southeast Asia ===
==== Indonesia ====
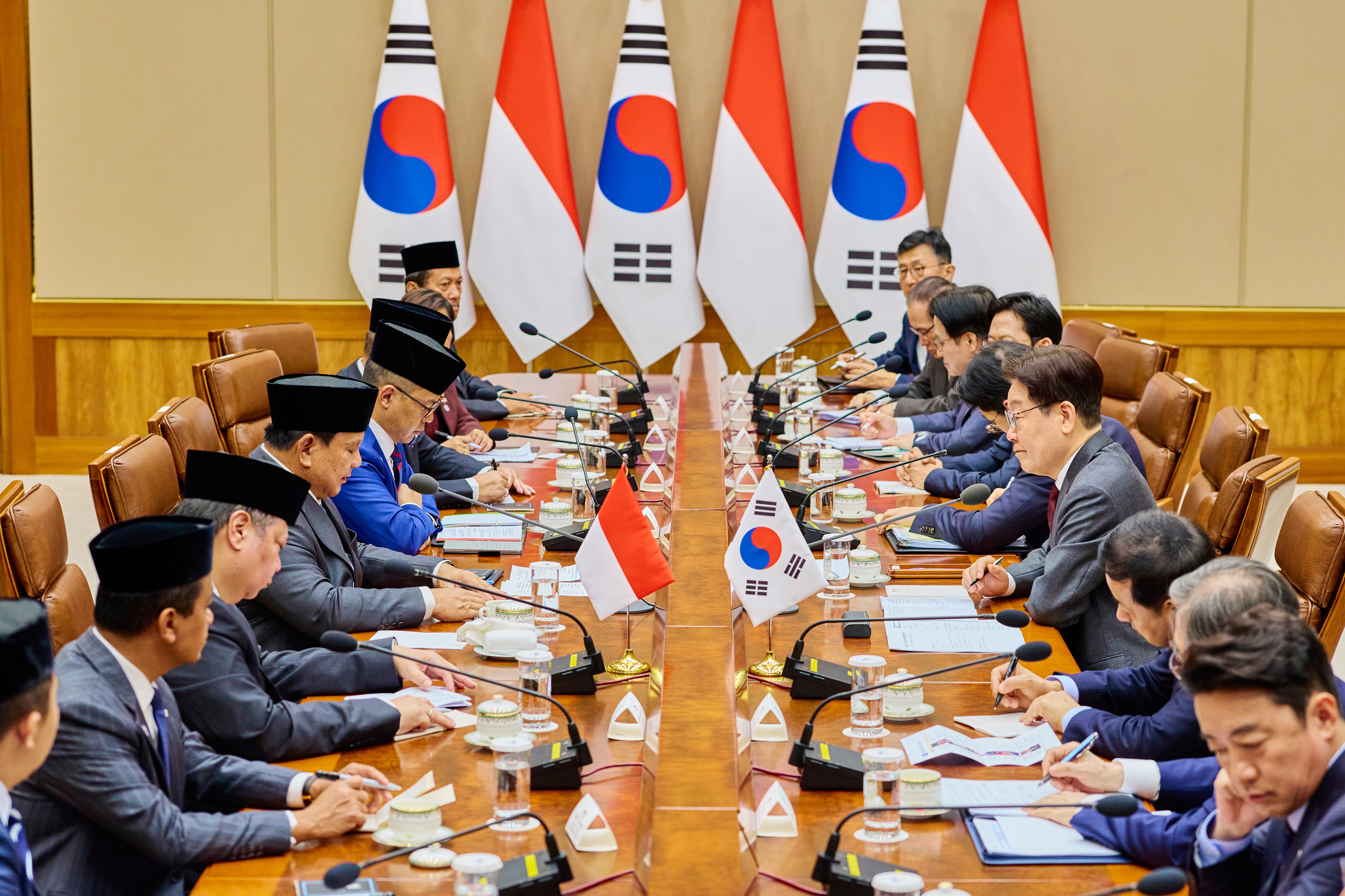
Lee to hold summit with Indonesian President Prabowo Subianto in Seoul, April 2026

In April 2026, Indonesian President Prabowo Subianto made his first state visit to South Korea since taking office and held a summit with President Lee. Regarding the international situation amidst the deepening Middle East crisis, President Lee stated, "There is concern that the aftermath of the Middle East war could have a major impact on the energy supply chains of both countries," adding, "It is necessary for both nations to expand cooperation on resource security to minimize the impact of this crisis." President Prabowo responded, "It is an unfortunate situation where global uncertainty is rising, but that is precisely why the relationship between our two countries is even more important," and remarked, "We are very close nations. Of course, even within a family, various misunderstandings can arise, but what matters is that the two countries share common interests."

Taking advantage of this summit, the two countries elevated their bilateral relationship to a "special comprehensive strategic partnership" and signed 16 memorandums of understanding. They signed a "Memorandum of Understanding on the Special Comprehensive Strategic Dialogue" to establish a communication channel between the foreign ministers, and a "Memorandum of Understanding on Economic Cooperation 2.0" to restart the bilateral Economic Cooperation Committee, which has been suspended since July 2023. In addition, they signed memorandums of understanding containing provisions to strengthen cooperation in fields such as the discovery of key minerals, artificial intelligence, renewable energy, carbon capture technology development, and offshore plants.

==== Singapore ====
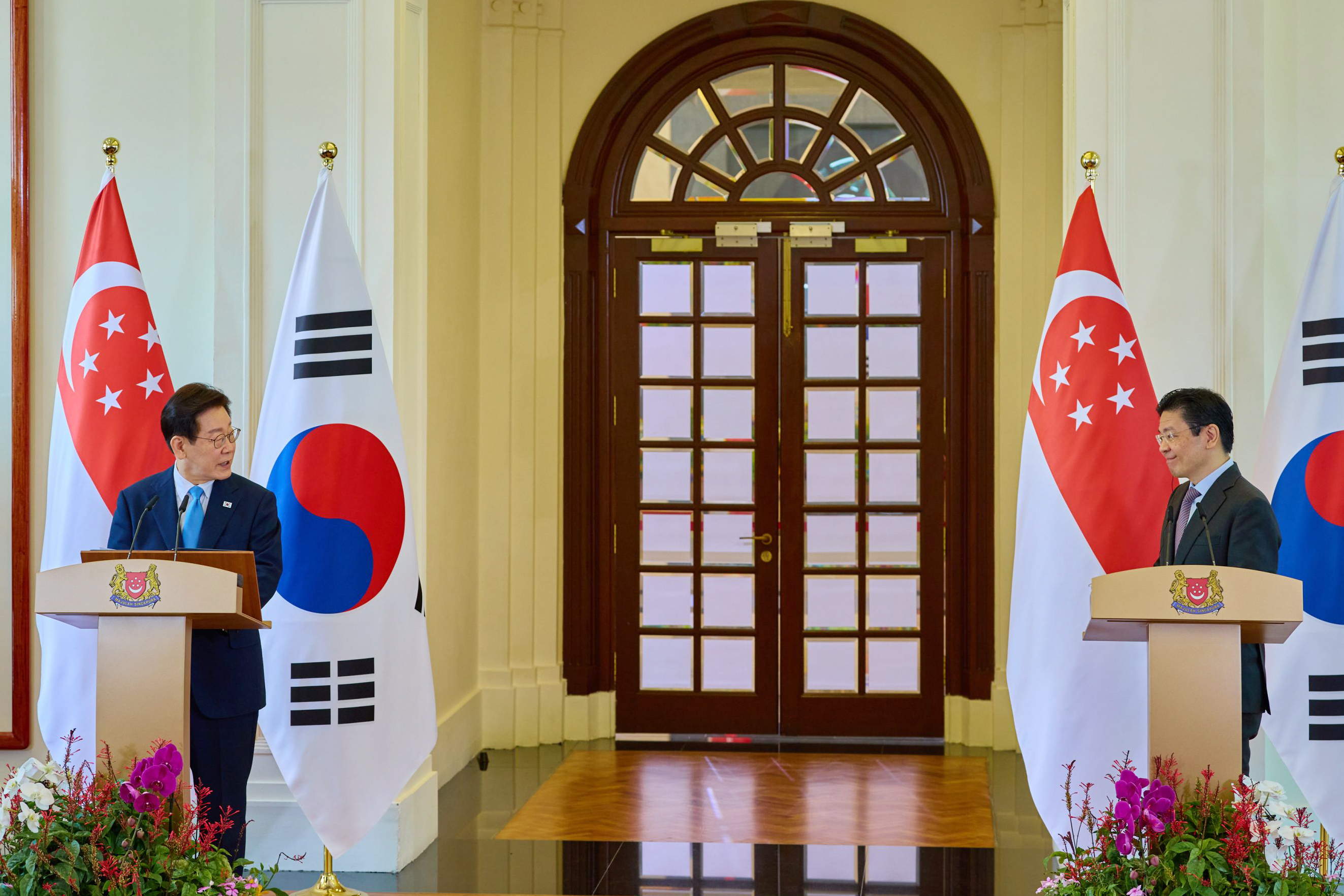
Lee and Singapore PM Lawrence Wong in Singapore, March 2026

In November 2025, relations between South Korea and Singapore were elevated to a "strategic partnership." President Lee held a summit in Seoul with Singaporean Prime Minister Lawrence Wong, who was visiting Korea to attend APEC Summit in Gyeongju, North Gyeongsang Province, and issued a joint press statement, agreeing to strengthen cooperation and coordination in various fields, including security and the economy. Regarding economic cooperation, the two countries agreed to revitalize trade and investment through improvements to the Korea-ASEAN Free Trade Agreement and a Korea-Singapore FTA. President Lee stated, "During this meeting, we also agreed to export beef and pork from Jeju Province to Singapore for the first time."

In March 2026, Lee paid a state visit to Singapore. On the 2nd, during a summit with Prime Minister Wong, President Lee proposed strengthening cooperation between the two countries, stating, "To navigate the turbulent waters of today's era of extreme uncertainty, we need a true partner we can trust to overcome difficulties together." Prime Minister Wong remarked, "As like-minded nations, Korea and Singapore share a strategic interest in safeguarding free trade and upholding a rules-based order, so there is boundless potential for the future." Lee visited the Capella Hotel on Sentosa Island, the site of the first North Korea–United States summit held in June 2018, and attended a state dinner hosted by Singaporean President Tharman Shanmugaratnam.

=== South and Central Asia ===
==== India ====
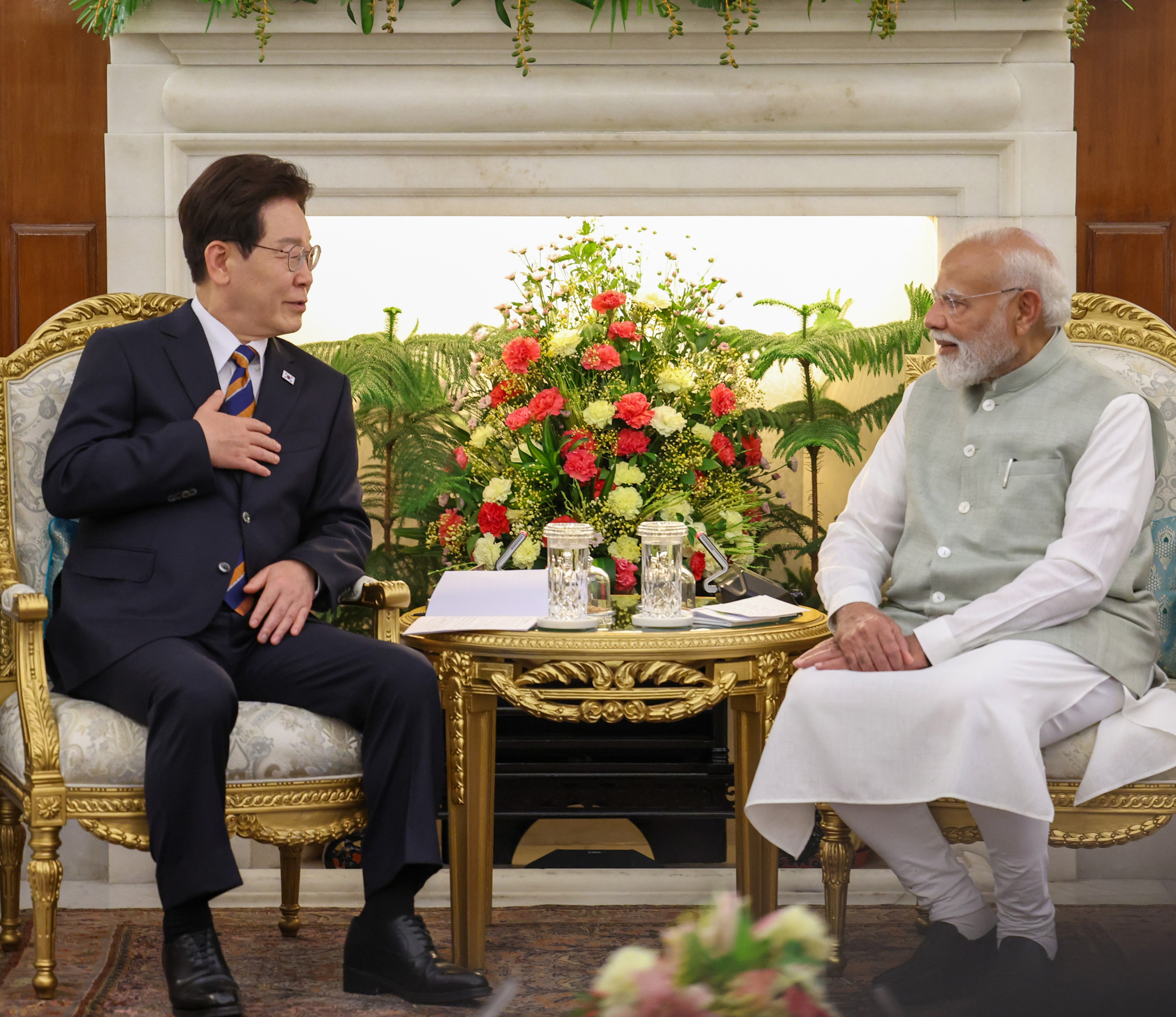
Lee and Indian PM Narendra Modi in New Delhi, April 2026

In April 2026, Lee paid a state visit to India and held a summit with Prime Minister Narendra Modi. In a joint press statement, President Lee stated that, taking this summit as an opportunity, they agreed to "further advance existing economic cooperation, expand cooperation in strategic industrial sectors including shipbuilding, finance, artificial intelligence, and defense, and further strengthen cultural and human exchanges." To this end, they decided to establish an Industrial Cooperation Committee, a ministerial-level economic cooperation platform, to strengthen cooperation in strategic fields such as trade and investment, key minerals, nuclear power, and clean energy. The two countries also adopted a joint declaration to resume negotiations to improve the Comprehensive Economic Partnership Agreement (CEPA) between Korea and India, and agreed to proceed with negotiations starting in May with the goal of concluding the agreement in the first half of the following year.

== Americas ==
=== North America ===
==== United States ====
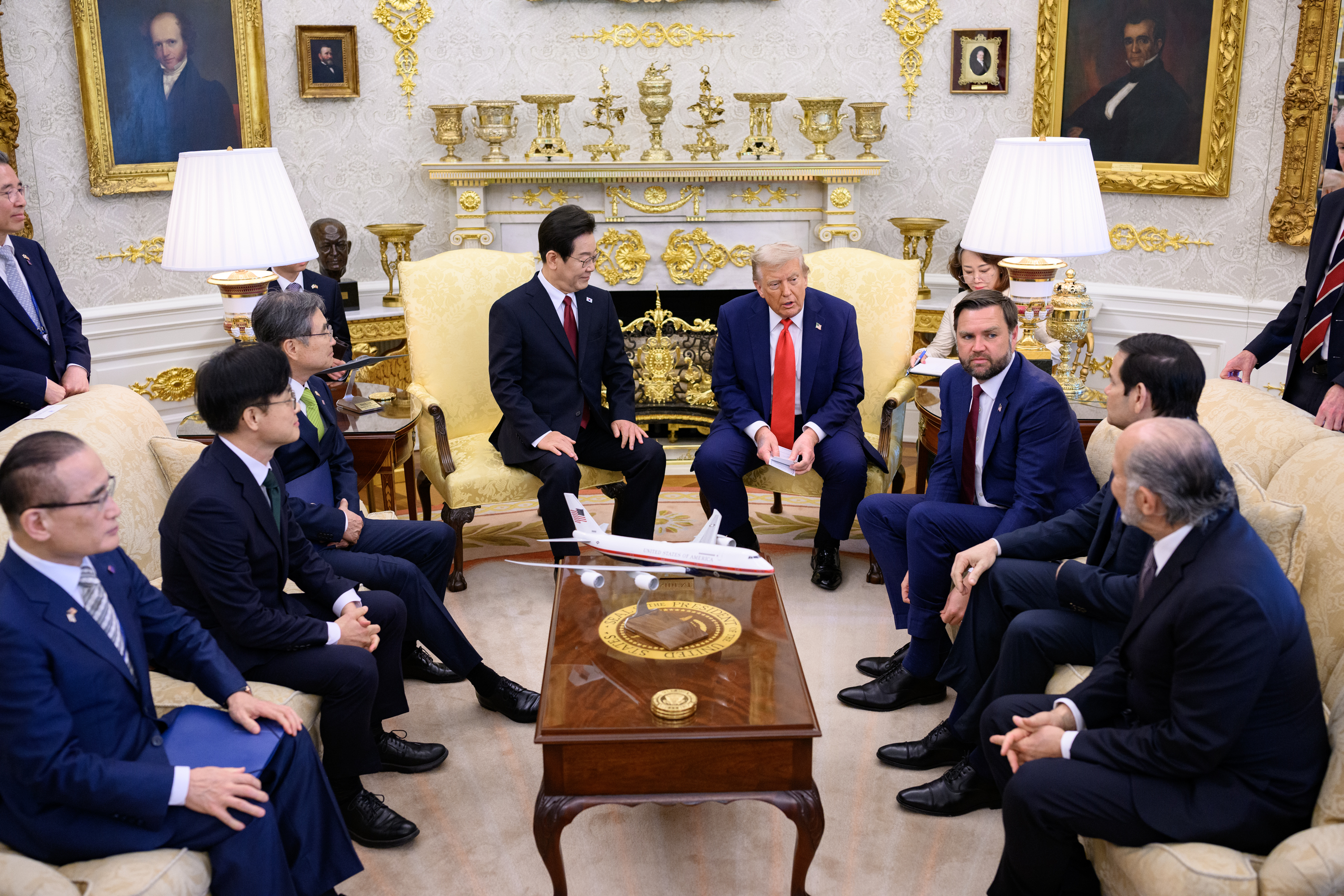
Lee and U.S. President Donald Trump, August 2025

On August 25, 2025, President Lee met with U.S. President Donald Trump at the White House. In his opening remarks at the summit, Lee stated, "I hope we can expand the South Korea-U.S. alliance not only in the military but also in the economic and science and technology sectors to develop it into a future-oriented model." President Trump emphasized cooperation in the shipbuilding industry.

President Trump visited South Korea in October 2025 and held talks with President Lee. After the meeting, Trump said he has granted approval for South Korea to build a nuclear-powered submarine, hailing the U.S.-South Korea military alliance as "stronger than ever before." on his Truth Social account. "I have given them approval to build a nuclear powered submarine, rather than the old fashioned, and far less nimble, diesel powered submarines that they have now," Trump wrote.

==== Canada ====
In October 2025, Lee and Canadian Prime Minister Mark Carney held a summit on the occasion of the APEC Gyeongju Summit and signed the Military and Defense Confidentiality Agreement to strengthen bilateral defense and security cooperation. In a joint statement, they unveiled a "new and bold roadmap" to deepen cooperation in interconnected strategic areas such as security, defense, cyber, space, and complex threats. In his opening remarks at the summit, President Lee emphasized that "Canada and Korea have a very special relationship," stating that Canada is a key ally to Korea that goes beyond a mere friend to an alliance.

South Korea's Hanwha Ocean had reached a two-way battle with Germany's TKMS for the Canadian Patrol Submarine, which includes the construction of 12 submarines and 30 years of maintenance and operation. July 2026, TKMS was selected as the preferred bidder. Prime Minister Carney made the announcement in person at the Halifax Naval Base, and Carney discussed the matter with President Lee over the weekend prior to the announcement.

=== South America ===
==== Chile ====
It was pointed out that the Korea-Chile FTA, signed and effective in 2004, needs to reflect the changed trade environment, such as digital trade and the restructuring of global supply chains. It is the Korea's first free trade agreement and the first trade agreement connecting Asia and Latin America. President Lee made an official visit to Chile in July 2026 as part of his five-country trip, and a summit between the two leaders took place.

During the summit, the modernization of the Korea-Chile FTA was discussed in detail. Regarding the relationship between South Korea and Chile, President Lee stated, "Chile, a major resource-rich nation as the world's number one copper producer and holder of the largest lithium reserves, and Korea, a leader in high-tech industries such as semiconductors and batteries, are natural and ideal partners in establishing a supply chain for key minerals." It was also stated, "The two countries agreed to reactivate the Korea-Chile FTA Free Trade Commission for the first time in 10 years to review trade and investment issues and to discuss ways to enhance bilateral trade relations, including improvements to the mutually beneficial Korea-Chile FTA." It was further noted, "They also exchanged in-depth views on cooperation measures in major economic partnerships such as the Comprehensive and Progressive Agreement for Trans-Pacific Partnership (CPTPP), the Pacific Alliance (PA), and the Digital Economy Partnership Agreement (DEPA)."

Infrastructure cooperation with Chile was also agreed to be strengthened. President Lee mentioned the Chacao Channel bridge, Chile's largest national project and the first four-lane suspension bridge in South America, which is currently under construction by Korean companies. He stated, "The two leaders agreed to take an interest at the government level and actively cooperate so that the construction of the Chacao Bridge proceeds smoothly, becomes a landmark project for bilateral cooperation, and contributes to the daily lives and economic activities of the Chilean people."

== Europe ==
=== European Union ===
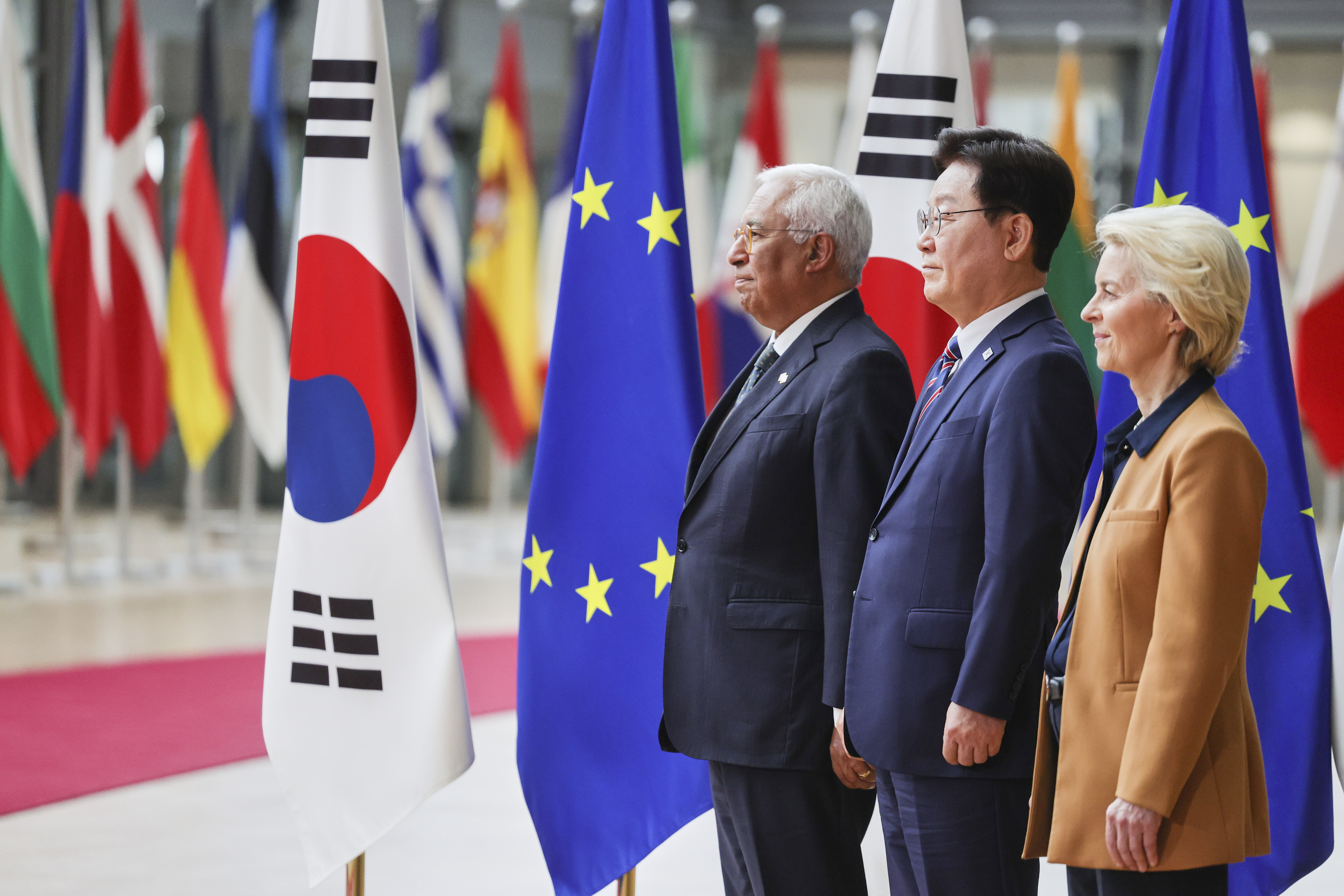
Lee, European Council President António Costa and European Commission President Ursula von der Leyen in European Union headquarters in Brussels, June 2026

In June 2026, President Lee visited Belgium and the European Union as the first leg of his 10-day, 9-night European tour. During a summit held on June 10 at the European Union Council headquarters in Brussels between President Lee, European Council President António Costa, and European Commission President Ursula von der Leyen, the topics of duty-free steel quotas and security sectors, including defense, were discussed in detail. On the issues of securing tariff-rate quotas, President Lee strongly requested favorable consideration for South Korea, a free trade agreement partner and strategic partner.

=== Eastern Europe ===
==== Ukraine ====
Lee announced a pledge to provide $100 million in comprehensive aid to Ukraine at the 2026 Ankara NATO summit. Lee stated, "South Korean government will continue to provide the humanitarian assistance needed by the Ukrainian people while also participating in the international community's efforts for the recovery and reconstruction of Ukraine."

On the 8th, during his first summit with Ukrainian President Volodymyr Zelenskyy since taking office, Lee promised $100 million in comprehensive aid to Ukraine while maintaining his existing stance that he would not provide lethal weapons. The two leaders agreed to resolve the issue of North Korean prisoners of war in Ukraine in a manner consistent with humanitarian principles, while respecting the free will of the parties involved.

=== Southern Europe ===
==== Italy ====
In June 2026, President Lee made a state visit to Italy as part of his European tour and held summit meetings with President Sergio Mattarella and Prime Minister Meloni. During the summit with President Mattarella, Lee agreed to elevate the strategic partnership established in 2018 to a special strategic partnership, while also agreeing to strengthen cooperation in future industries such as artificial intelligence, defense, and space, as well as in culture and people-to-people exchanges. During the summit with Prime Minister Meloni, the 2026-2030 Korea-Italy Strategic Action Plan was adopted. The document contains specific cooperation and action plans categorized into political dialogue, economic cooperation, trade, investment and development, science, technology, innovation and space, cultural and academic exchange and tourism, education and people-to-people exchange, defense cooperation, and security and law enforcement. It specifies that the two countries will strengthen cooperation on multilateral stages, including the G20, in consideration of the South Korea's assumption of the G20 Summit in 2028, and will cooperate to promote partnerships between the South Korea and the G7 to advocate for rules-based international trade, supply chain resilience, and artificial intelligence governance. A development cooperation MOU was also signed to jointly support economic growth in Africa and the Indo-Pacific region in response to supply chain and energy crises resulting from the Middle East war.

=== Western and Central Europe ===
==== France ====
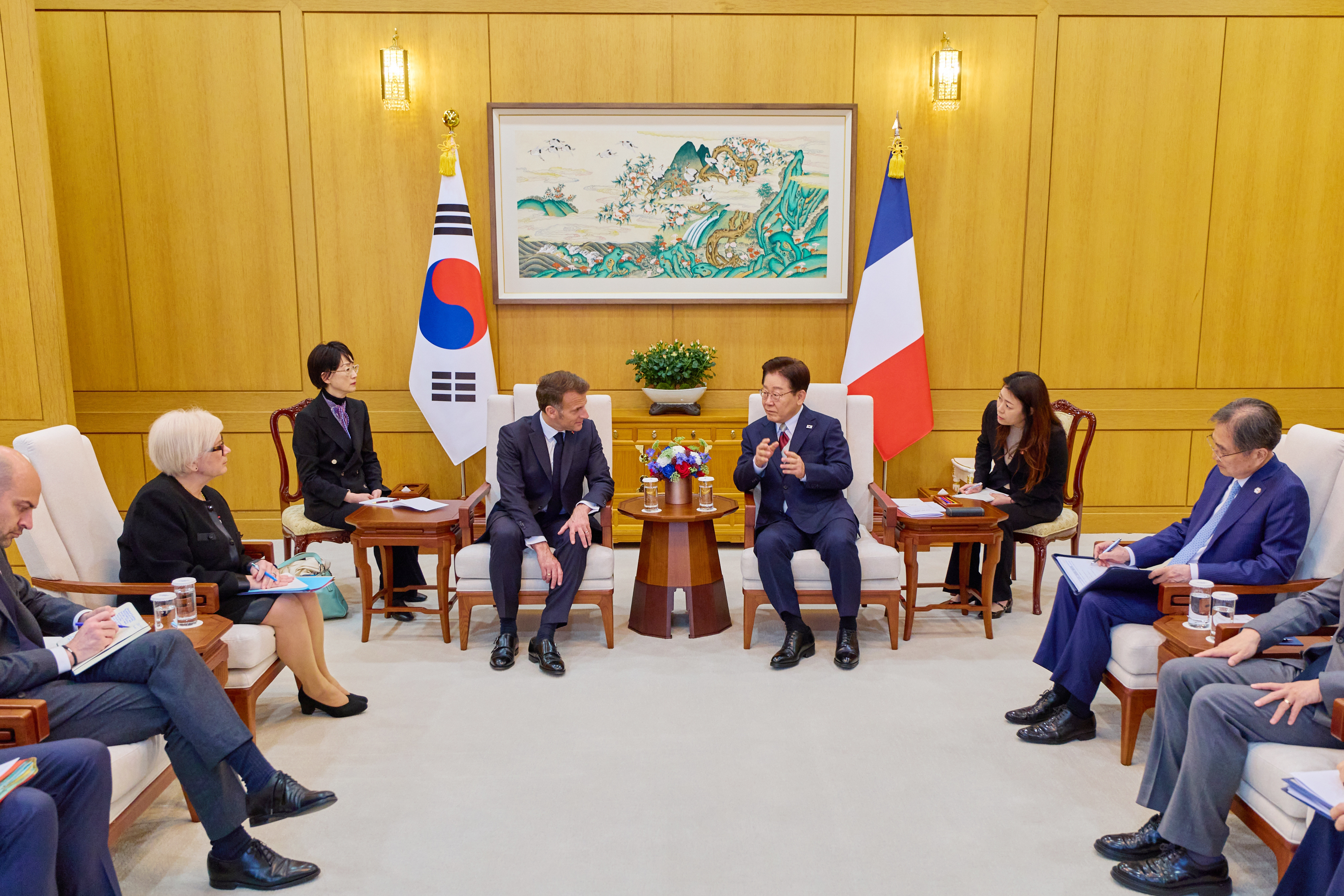
Lee and French President Emmanuel Macron in Seoul, April 2026

In April 2026, when the Iran war was in progress, marking the 140th anniversary of diplomatic relations between the two countries, French President Emmanuel Macron made state visit to Korea. During the visit, he held a summit with President Lee and agreed to cooperate in securing safe maritime transport routes in the Strait of Hormuz. Following this summit, relations between the two countries were elevated to a Global Strategic Partnership. "President Macron and I agreed to share policy-related experiences and strategies in order to jointly address the economic and energy crises triggered by the Middle East war. We also concurred on working together to reduce uncertainty in the global economy," Lee said during a joint press announcement.

== See also ==
- List of international presidential trips made by Lee Jae Myung
- Foreign policy of South Korea
- Foreign relations of South Korea
