= List of international presidential trips made by Lee Jae Myung =

Lee Jae Myung, the 14th president of South Korea, has made 16 international trips to 23 countries during his presidency, which began on 4 June 2025.

== Summary ==
The number of visits per country where President Lee traveled are:

- One visit to Argentina, Belgium, Brazil, Canada, Chile, China, Egypt, Germany, India, Italy, Malaysia, Mexico, Mongolia, Singapore, South Africa, United Arab Emirates, Vatican City and Vietnam.
- Two visits to France, Japan, the Philippines and Turkey
- Four visits to the United States

Map of international trips made by Lee Jae Myung as president (as of September 2026): South Korea 1 visit 2 visits 3 visits 4 visits

=== 2025 ===
#	Country	Areas visited	Dates	Details	Image
1	Canada	Kananaskis	16–18 June	Attended the 51st G7 summit. Also held a bilateral meeting with Japanese Prime Minister Shigeru Ishiba.	
2	Japan	Tokyo	23–24 August	Working visit. Lee met with Prime Minister Shigeru Ishiba.	
3	United States	Washington, D.C.	24–26 August	Working visit. Lee met with President Donald Trump.	
4	United States	New York City	22–26 September	Attended the 80th session of the UN General Assembly.	
5	Malaysia	Kuala Lumpur	26–27 October	Attended the ASEAN-Korea Summit, as part of the 47th ASEAN Summit.	
6	United Arab Emirates	Abu Dhabi	17–19 November	State visit. Lee met with President Mohamed bin Zayed Al Nahyan.	
6	Egypt	Cairo	19–21 November	Official visit. Lee met with President Abdel Fattah el-Sisi.	
6	South Africa	Johannesburg	21–23 November	Attended the G20 summit.	
6	Turkey	Ankara	24–25 November	State visit. Lee met with President Recep Tayyip Erdoğan.	

=== 2026 ===
#	Country	Areas visited	Dates	Details	Image
7	China	Beijing, Shanghai	4–7 January	State visit. Lee met with President and Communist Party General Secretary Xi Jinping.	
8	Japan	Nara	13–14 January	Working visit. Lee met with Prime Minister Sanae Takaichi as part of ongoing shuttle diplomacy between South Korea and Japan.	
9	Singapore	Singapore	1–3 March	State visit. Lee met with President Tharman Shanmugaratnam and Prime Minister Lawrence Wong.	
9	Philippines	Metro Manila	3–4 March	State visit. Lee met with President Bongbong Marcos.	
10	India	New Delhi	19–21 April	State visit. Lee met with President Droupadi Murmu and Prime Minister Narendra Modi.	
10	Vietnam	Hanoi	21–24 April	State visit. Lee met with President and Communist Party General Secretary Tô Lâm, Prime Minister Lê Minh Hưng and Chairman of the National Assembly Trần Thanh Mẫn.	
11	Belgium	Brussels	9–10 June	Official visit. Lee met with King Philippe and Prime Minister Bart De Wever to mark the 125th anniversary of diplomatic relations between South Korea and Belgium. He then met with European Council President Ursula von der Leyen and European Commission President António Costa.	
11	Italy	Rome, Florence	10–16 June	State visit. Lee received the Knight Grand Cross of the Order of Merit from President Sergio Mattarella at a state banquet on June 11. On June 12, he met with Prime Minister Giorgia Meloni and signed four MoUs on bilateral cooperation in science, technology, the social economy, and support for SMEs. On June 13, he visited the Uffizi Gallery in Florence and signed an MOU on museum collaboration between the National Museum of Korea and the Uffizi.	
11	Vatican City	Vatican City	14–15 June	Official visit. Lee gave a speech at a special Mass for peace and solidarity at the Basilica of Saint Paul Outside the Walls in Rome, officiated by Cardinal Lazarus You Heung-sik. He pledged support for Seoul's hosting of World Youth Day 2027 and expressed commitment to inter-Korean peace. He then met with Pope Leo XIV in a private meeting.	
11	France	Évian-les-Bains	16–17 June	Lee attended the 52nd G7 summit at the invitation of President Emmanuel Macron.	
12	Turkey	Ankara	7–8 July	Lee attended the 2026 Ankara NATO summit. He also held bilateral meetings with Norwegian Prime Minister Jonas Gahr Støre, Ukrainian President Volodymyr Zelenskyy and Romanian President Nicușor Dan.	
12	Mongolia	Ulaanbaatar	9–11 July	State visit. Lee met with President Ukhnaagiin Khürelsükh and attended the opening ceremony of the Naadam festival.	
13	United States	San Francisco, Silicon Valley	24–26 July	Lee attended the San Francisco AI Summit and a Silicon Valley venture capital investment meetup. He met with Dario Amodei, CEO of Anthropic, Sam Altman, CEO of OpenAI, Jensen Huang, CEO of Nvidia; and Hock Tan, CEO of Broadcom Inc.	
13	Brazil	Brasília, São Paulo	26–29 July	State visit. Lee met with President Luiz Inácio Lula da Silva.	
13	Chile	Santiago	29–30 July	Official visit. Lee met with President José Antonio Kast.	
13	Argentina	Buenos Aires	30 July–1 August	Official visit. Lee met with President Javier Milei.	
13	Germany	Frankfurt	1–2 August	Lee held a meeting with residents of the Korean community in Germany.	
14	France	Paris, Saint-Paul-de-Vence	6–9 September	State visit. Lee met with President Emmanuel Macron. Lee served as co-chair of the Lumière Summit, a global film and video summit.	
15	United States	New York City	21–23 September	Lee attended the 81st United Nations General Assembly. On the first day of the assembly, he met with Australian Prime Minister Anthony Albanese and United States President Donald Trump.	
15	Mexico	Mexico City	23–26 September	State visit. Lee met with President Claudia Sheinbaum.	
16	Philippines	Metro Manila	16–18 November	Lee attended the 27th ASEAN–ROK Summit and the 21st East Asia Summit. He met with President Bongbong Marcos.	
16	China	Shenzhen	18–19 November	Lee attended the APEC China 2026.	

== Future trips ==
The following international trips are scheduled to be made by Lee Jae Myung during 2026:

Country	Areas visited	Dates	Details
United States	Miami	14–15 December	Lee is scheduled to attend the 2026 G20 Miami summit.
Indonesia	Jakarta	TBA	Lee is expected to make a state visit to Indonesia.

== Multilateral meetings ==
Multilateral meetings of the following intergovernmental organizations are scheduled to take place during Lee Jae Myung's presidency (2025–present).

Group	Year				
Group	2025	2026	2027	2028	2029
UNGA	22–26 September, (United States) New York City	22–23 September, (United States) New York City	September, (United States) New York City	September, (United States) New York City	September, (United States) New York City
ASEM	None	None	None	None	None
EAS (ASEAN+3)	26–28 October, (Malaysia) Kuala Lumpur	16–18 November, (Philippines) Pasay	TBA	TBA	TBA
ASEAN-Korea	27 October, (Malaysia) Kuala Lumpur	16 November, (Philippines) Pasay	TBA	TBA	TBA
APEC	31 October – 1 November, (South Korea) Gyeongju	18–19 November, (China) Shenzhen	TBA, Vietnam	TBA, Mexico	TBA
G20	22–23 November, (South Africa) Johannesburg	14–15 December, (United States) Miami	TBA, United Kingdom	TBA, South Korea	TBA
China–Japan–Korea	None	TBA	TBA	TBA	TBA
Others	G7; 16–17 June, (Canada) Kananaskis	G7; 15–17 June, (France) Évian-les-Bains	TBA	TBA	TBA
Others	G7; 16–17 June, (Canada) Kananaskis	NATO; 7–8 July, (Turkey) Ankara	TBA	TBA	TBA
Future event

== See also ==
- List of international trips made by presidents of South Korea
