= 2026 G20 Miami summit =

Future summit of the leaders of all G20 member nations in Miami, United States

2026 G20 Miami summit 21st G20 Summit
- 14–15 December 2026
- Host country: United States
- Cities: Miami
- Venues: Trump National Doral Miami
- Participants: G20 members Invited states: Armenia; Azerbaijan; Finland; Ireland; Kazakhstan; Netherlands; Norway; Poland; Qatar; Singapore; Spain; United Arab Emirates; Uzbekistan; Vietnam
- Chair: Donald Trump, President of the United States
- Website: g20.org

The 2026 G20 Doral Summit will be the twenty-first meeting of the Group of Twenty (G20), a meeting of heads of state and government planned from 14 to 15 December 2026. It will be held at the Trump National Doral Miami, a property of the host, U.S. president Donald Trump, in Doral, Florida. The announcement was made by Miami Mayor Francis Suarez in the Oval Office and later confirmed by Doral Mayor Christi Fraga.

On 27 November 2025, President Trump announced that South Africa will not be invited to the 2026 G20 summit, citing its treatment of Afrikaners and a dispute over South Africa's refusal to transfer G20 hosting duties to a U.S. Embassy representative at the end of the 2025 G20 Johannesburg summit.

This will be Emmanuel Macron's last G20 summit, this will be Andy Burnham's first G20 summit, after winning the 2026 Labour Party leadership election in mid 2026

== Expected participating leaders ==
The following country and international organisation leaders have been expected to participate in the summit:

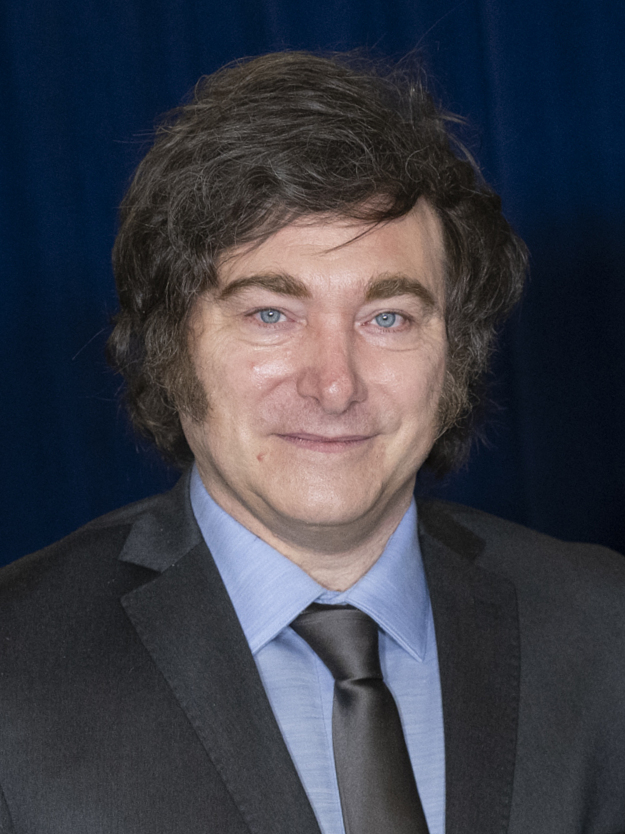
Argentina
Javier Milei, President

Australia
Anthony Albanese, Prime Minister

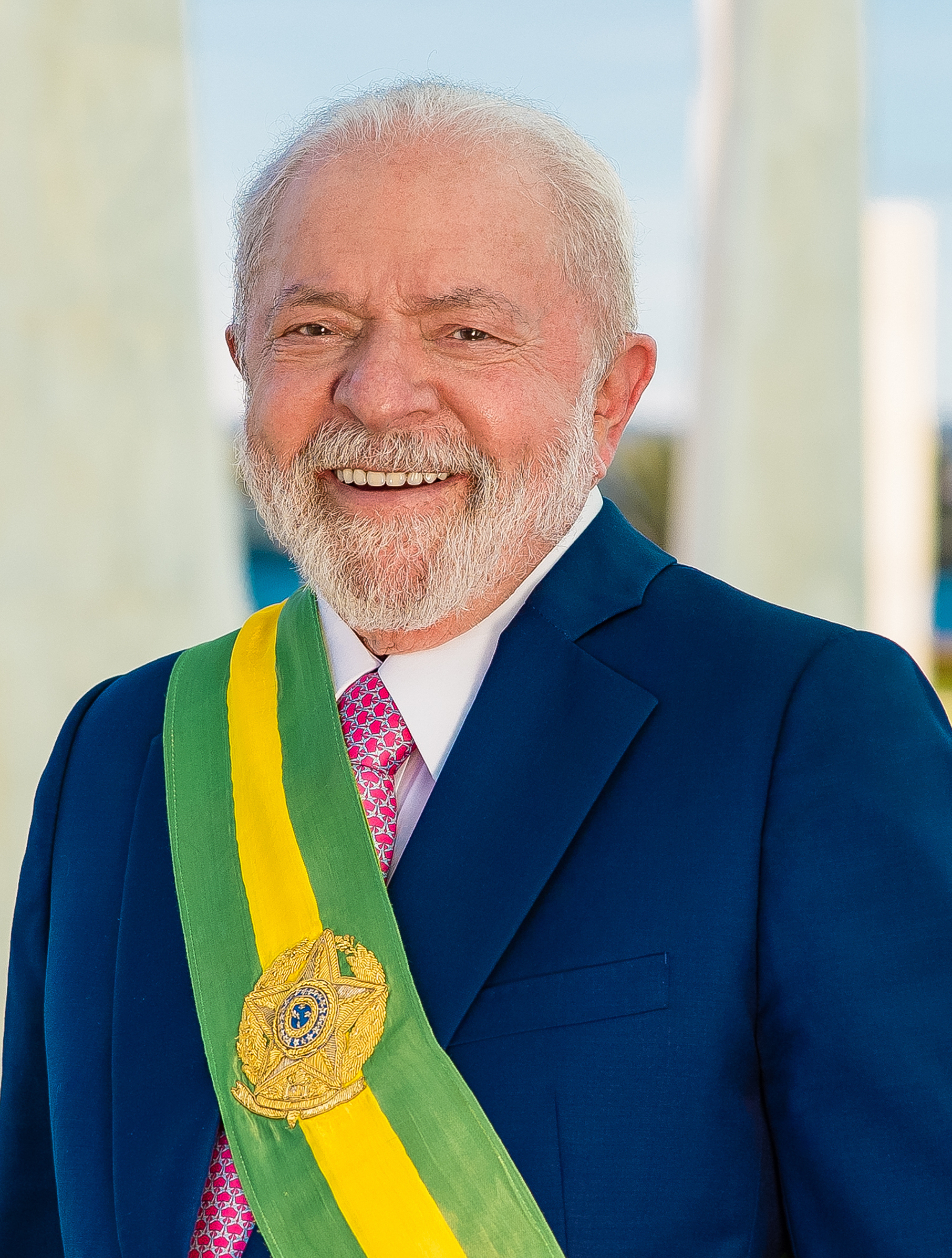
Brazil
Luiz Inácio Lula da Silva, President

Canada
Mark Carney, Prime Minister

China
Xi Jinping, CCP General Secretary and President (Note: The president of China is legally a ceremonial office, but the general secretary of the Chinese Communist Party (de facto top leader in a one-party communist state) has always held this office since 1993 except for the months of transition, and the current CCP general secretary is Xi Jinping, who is also the Chinese president.)

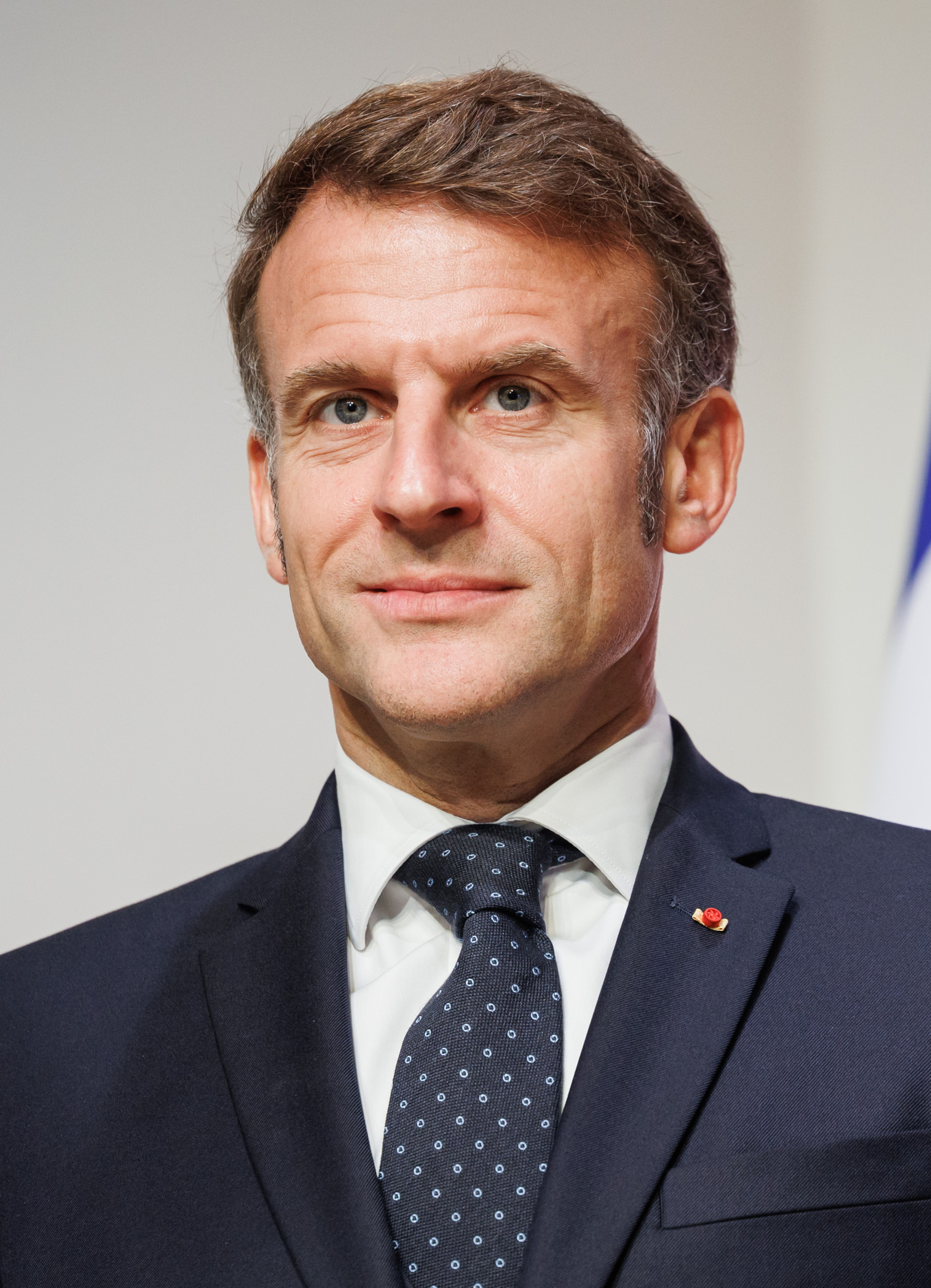
France
Emmanuel Macron, President

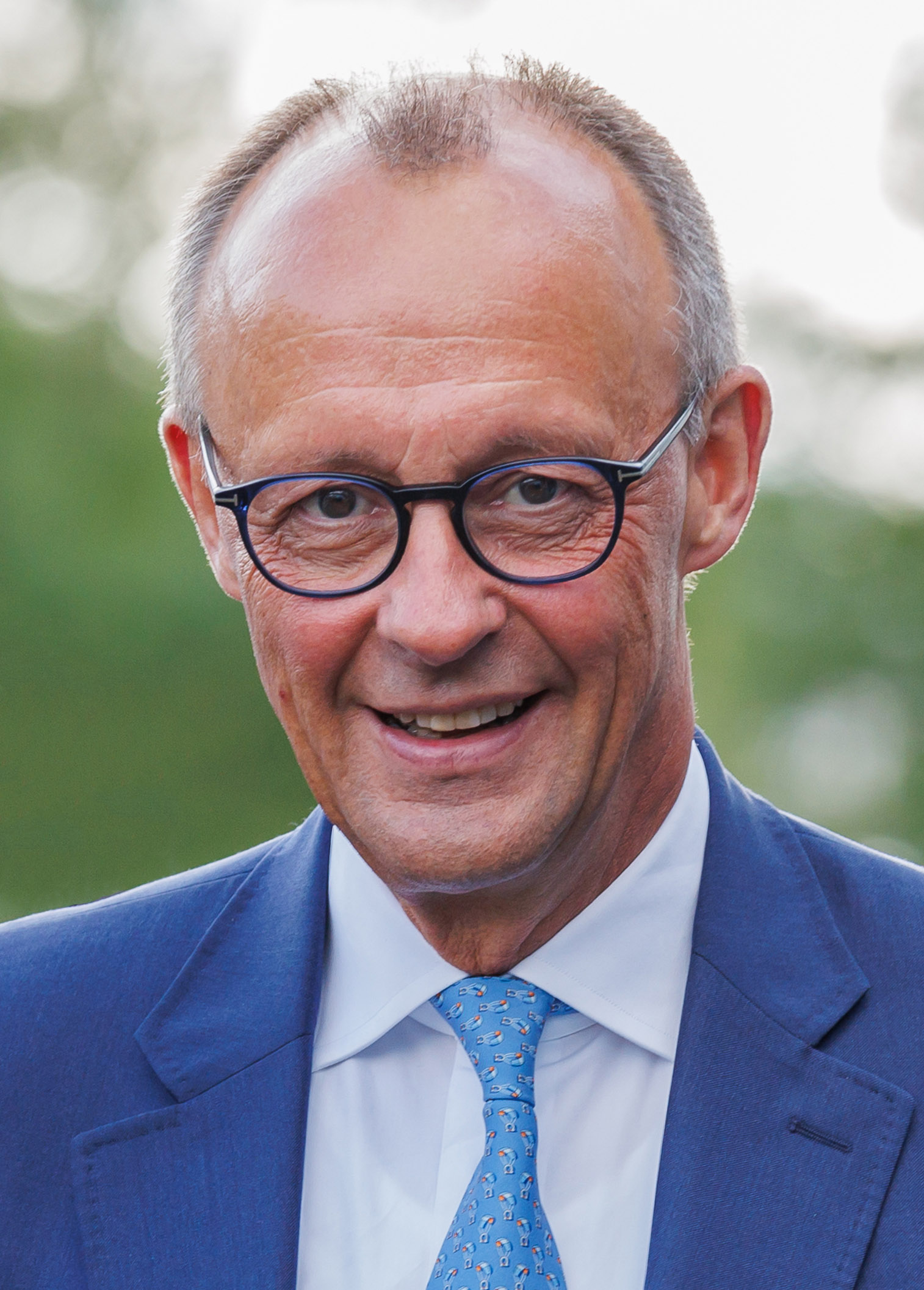
Germany
Friedrich Merz, Chancellor

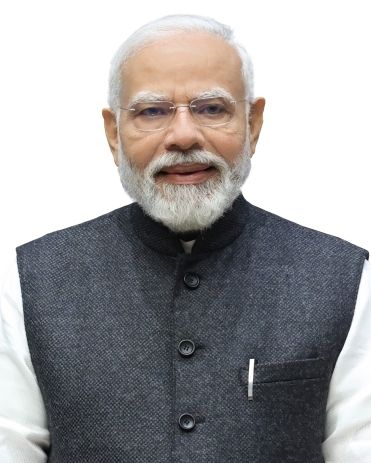
India
Narendra Modi, Prime Minister

Indonesia
Prabowo Subianto, President

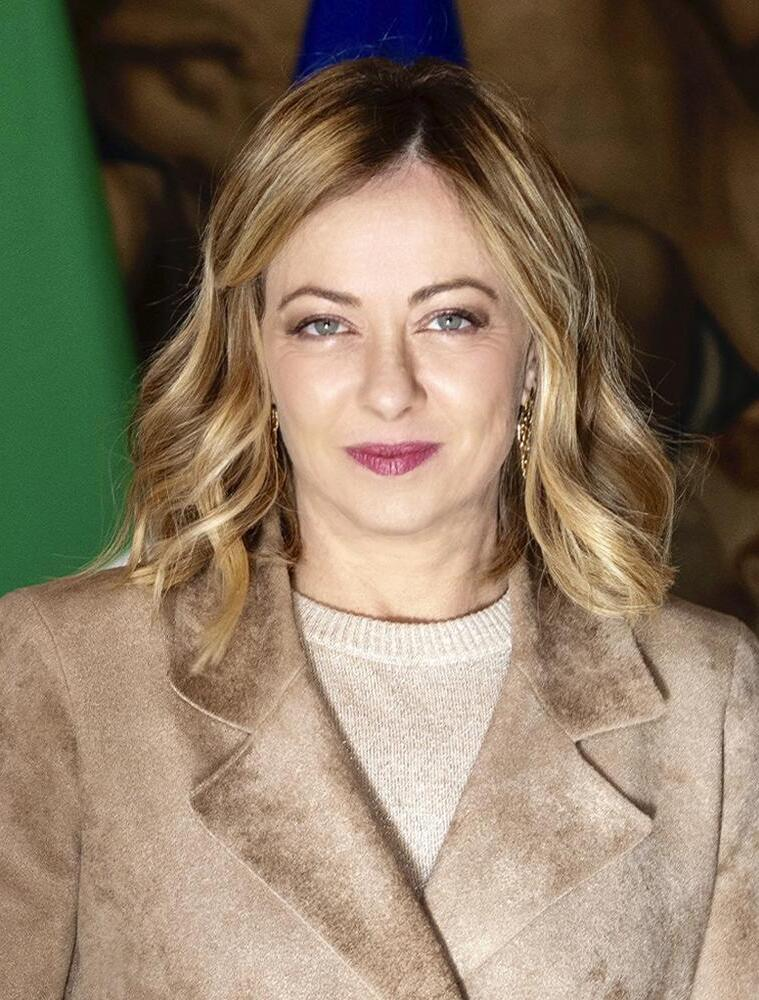
Italy
Giorgia Meloni, Prime Minister

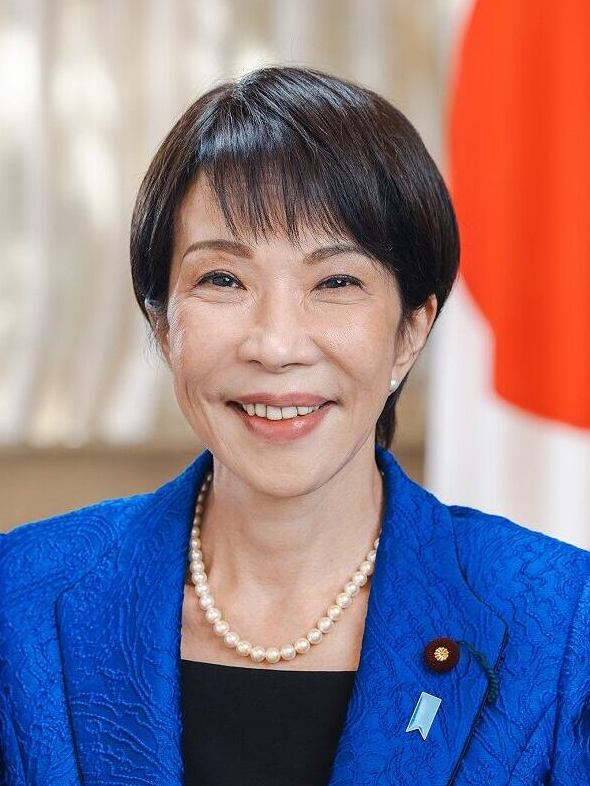
Japan
Sanae Takaichi,
Prime Minister

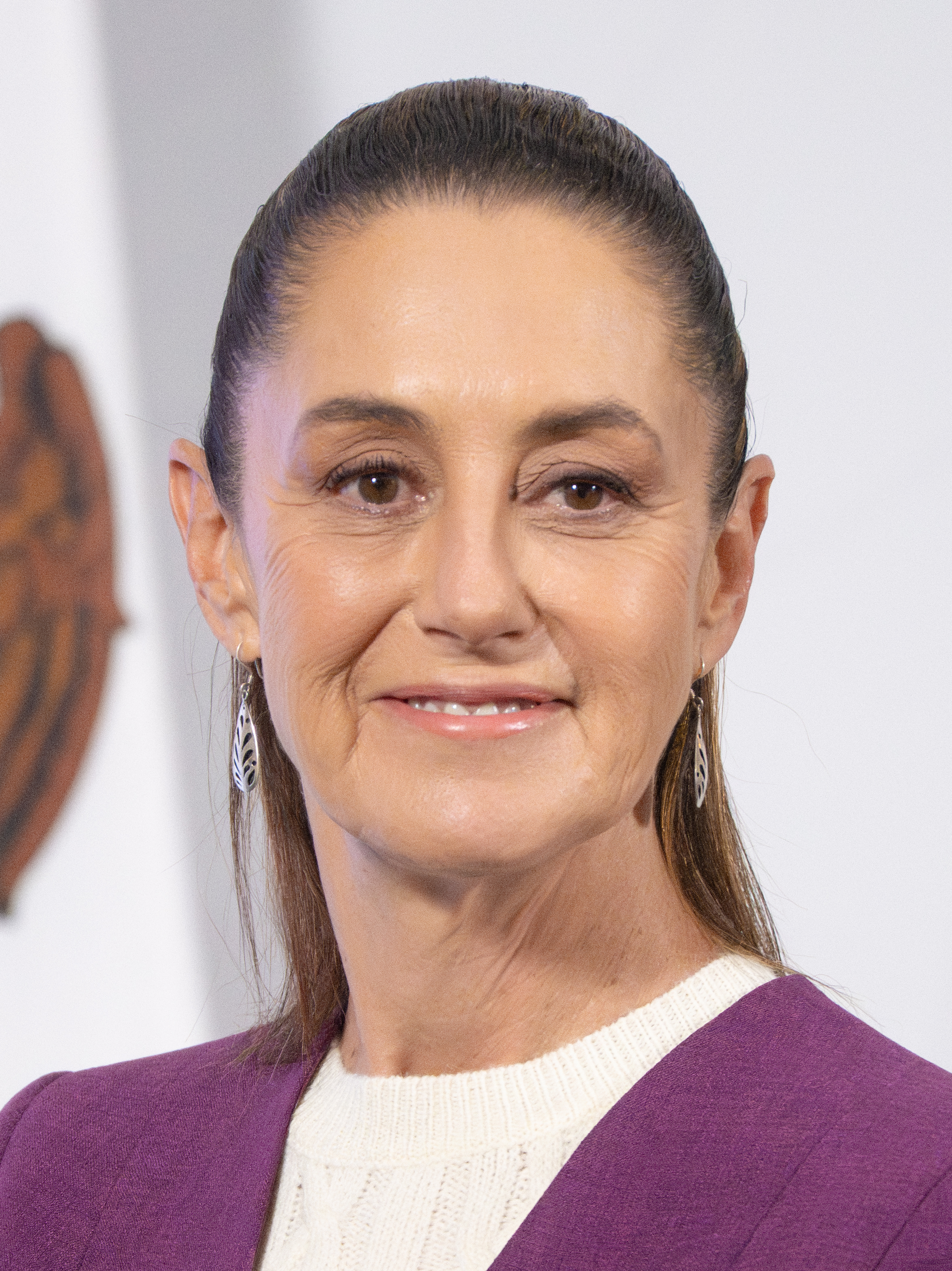
Mexico
Claudia Sheinbaum, President

Russia
Vladimir Putin, President

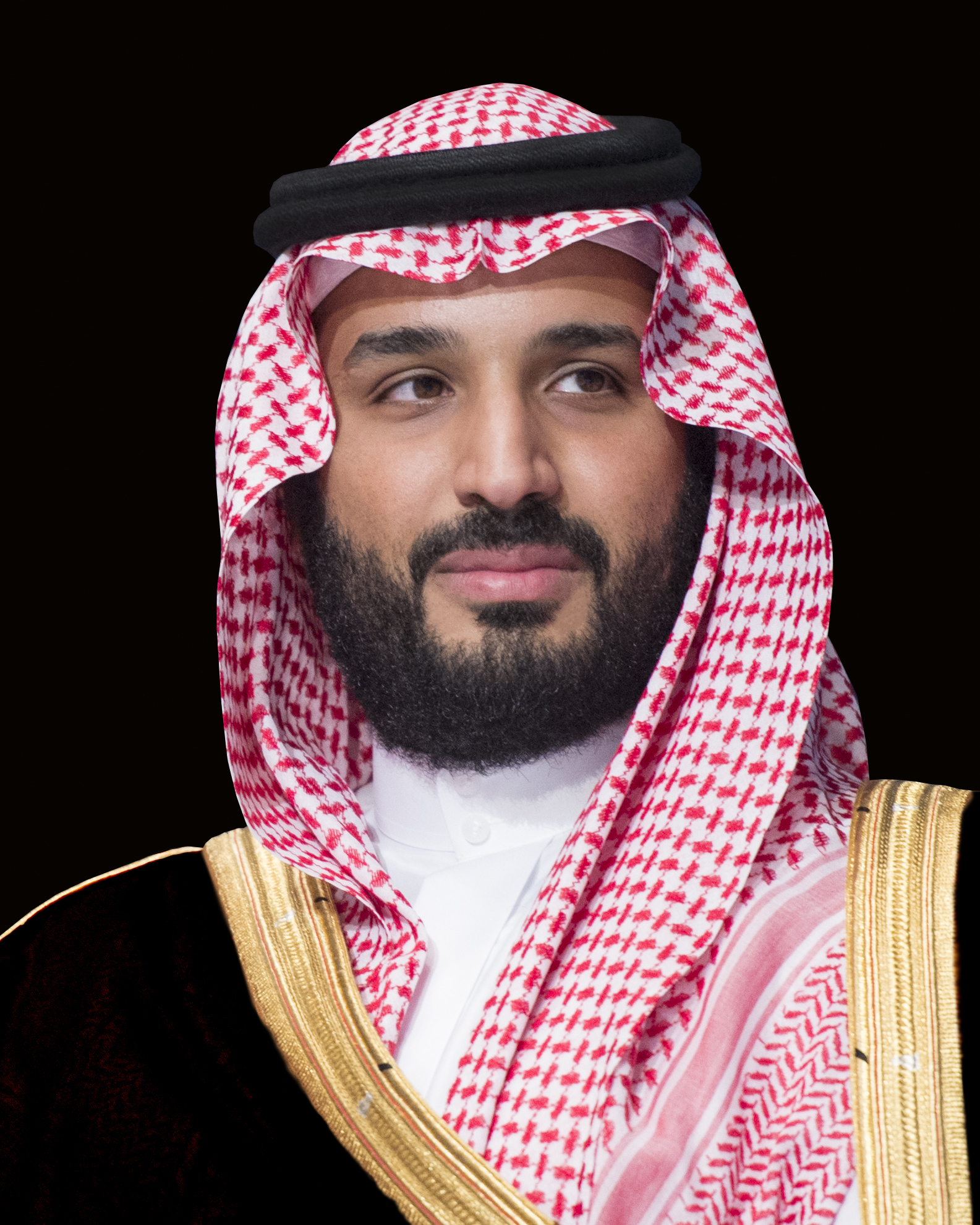
Saudi Arabia
Mohammed bin Salman, Crown Prince and Prime Minister

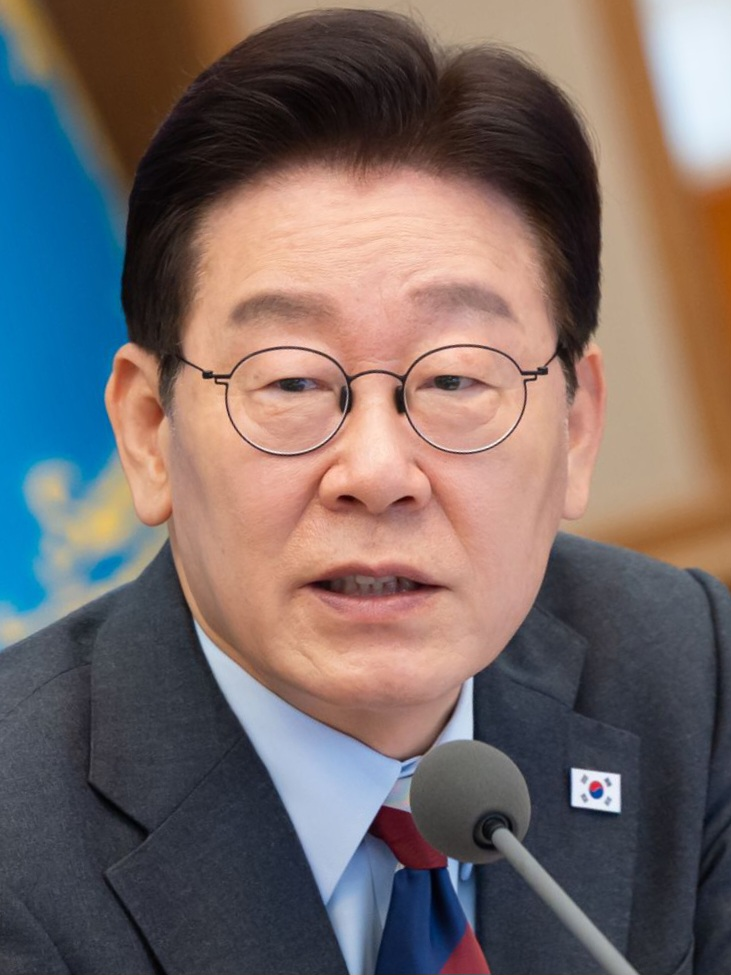
South Korea
Lee Jae Myung, President

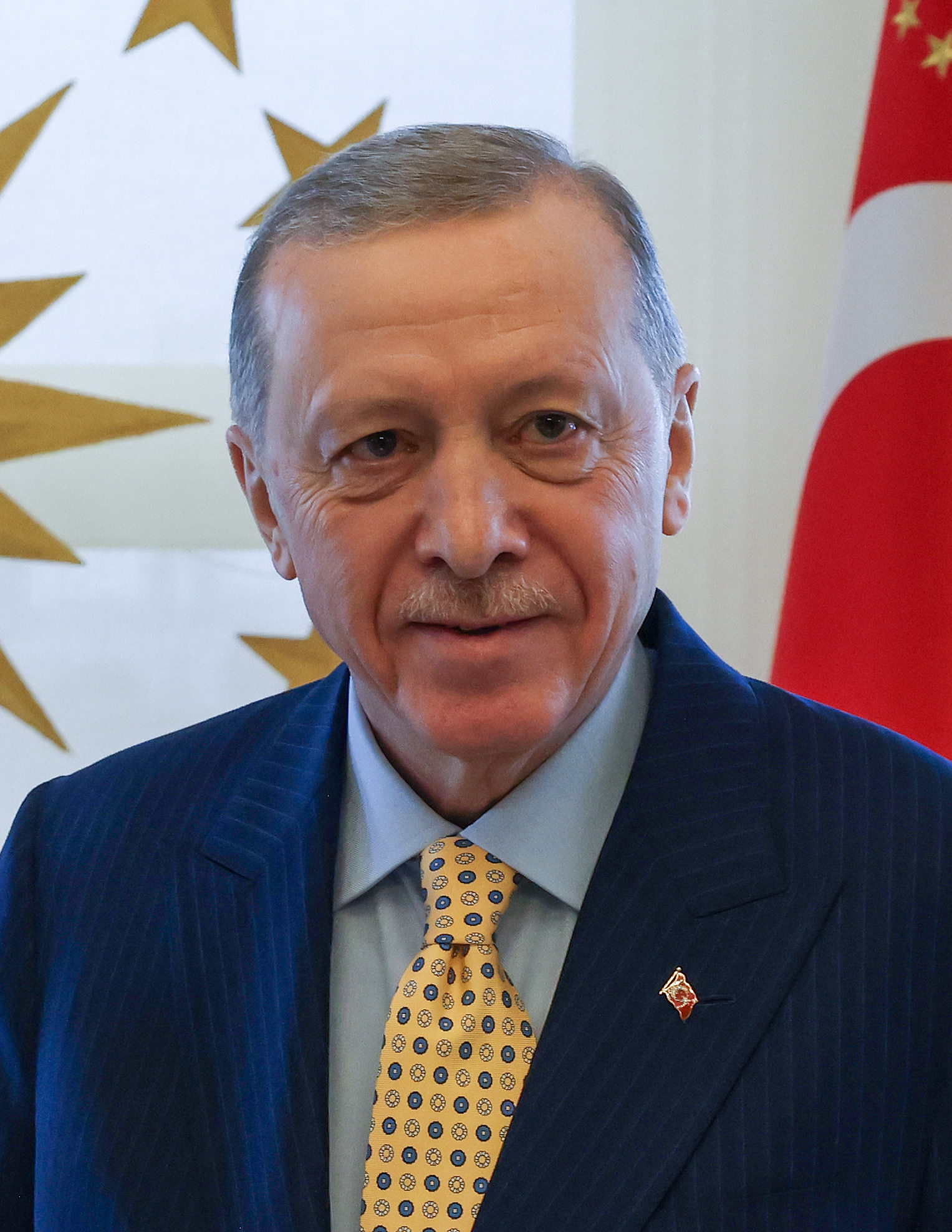
Turkey
Recep Tayyip Erdoğan, President

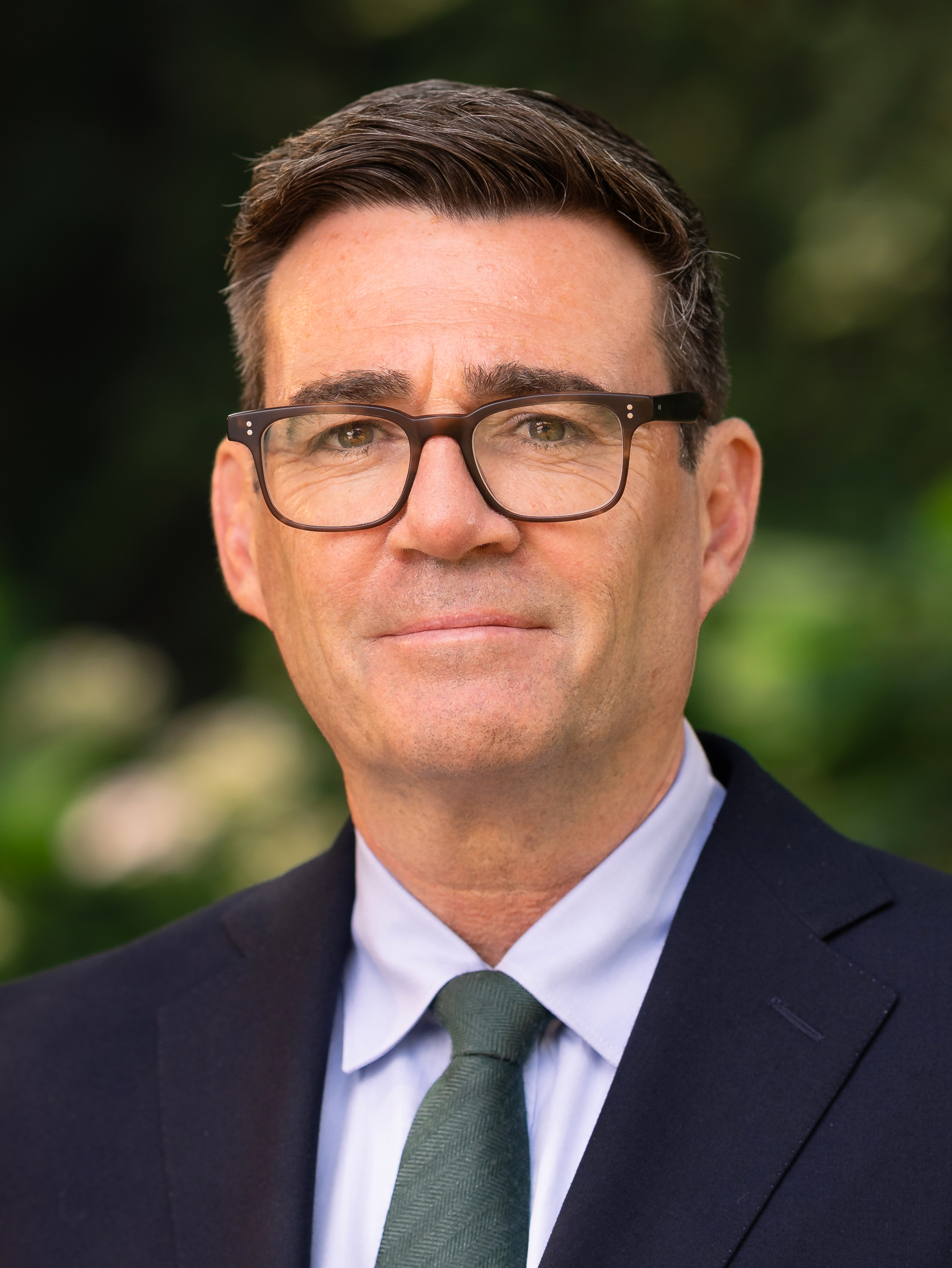
United Kingdom
Andy Burnham, Prime Minister

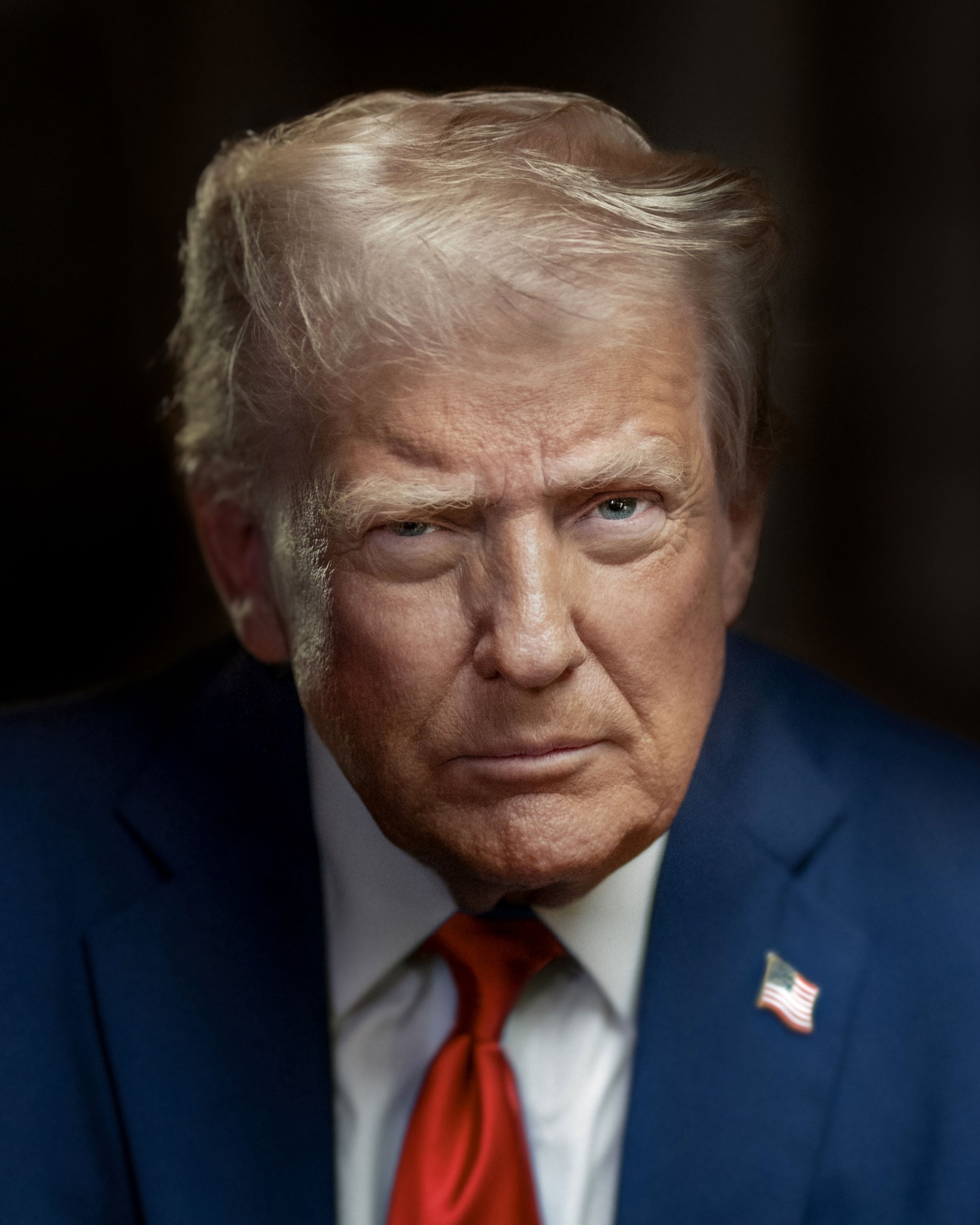
United States
Donald Trump, President (Host)

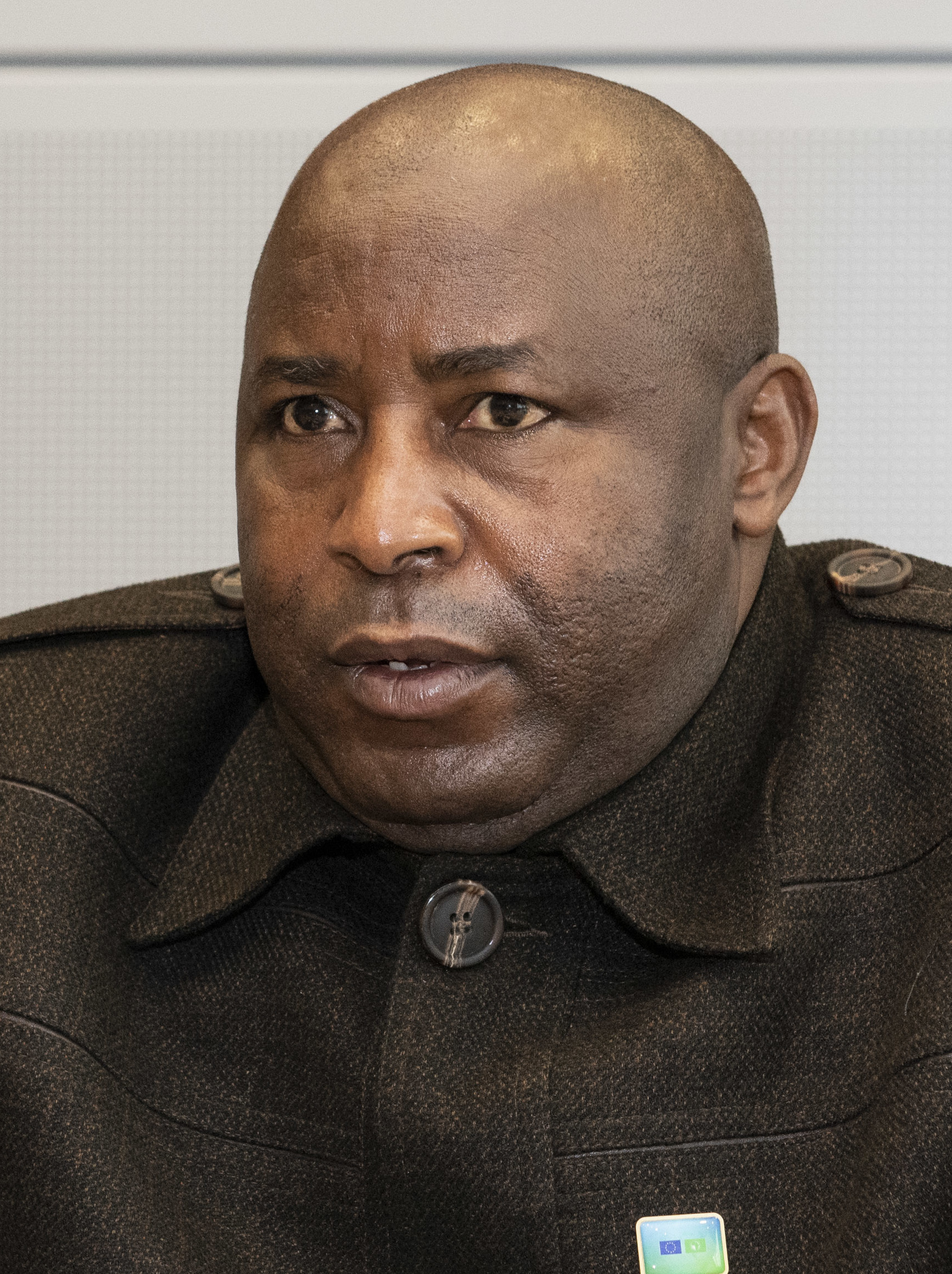
African Union
Évariste Ndayishimiye, Chairperson of the African Union and President of Burundi

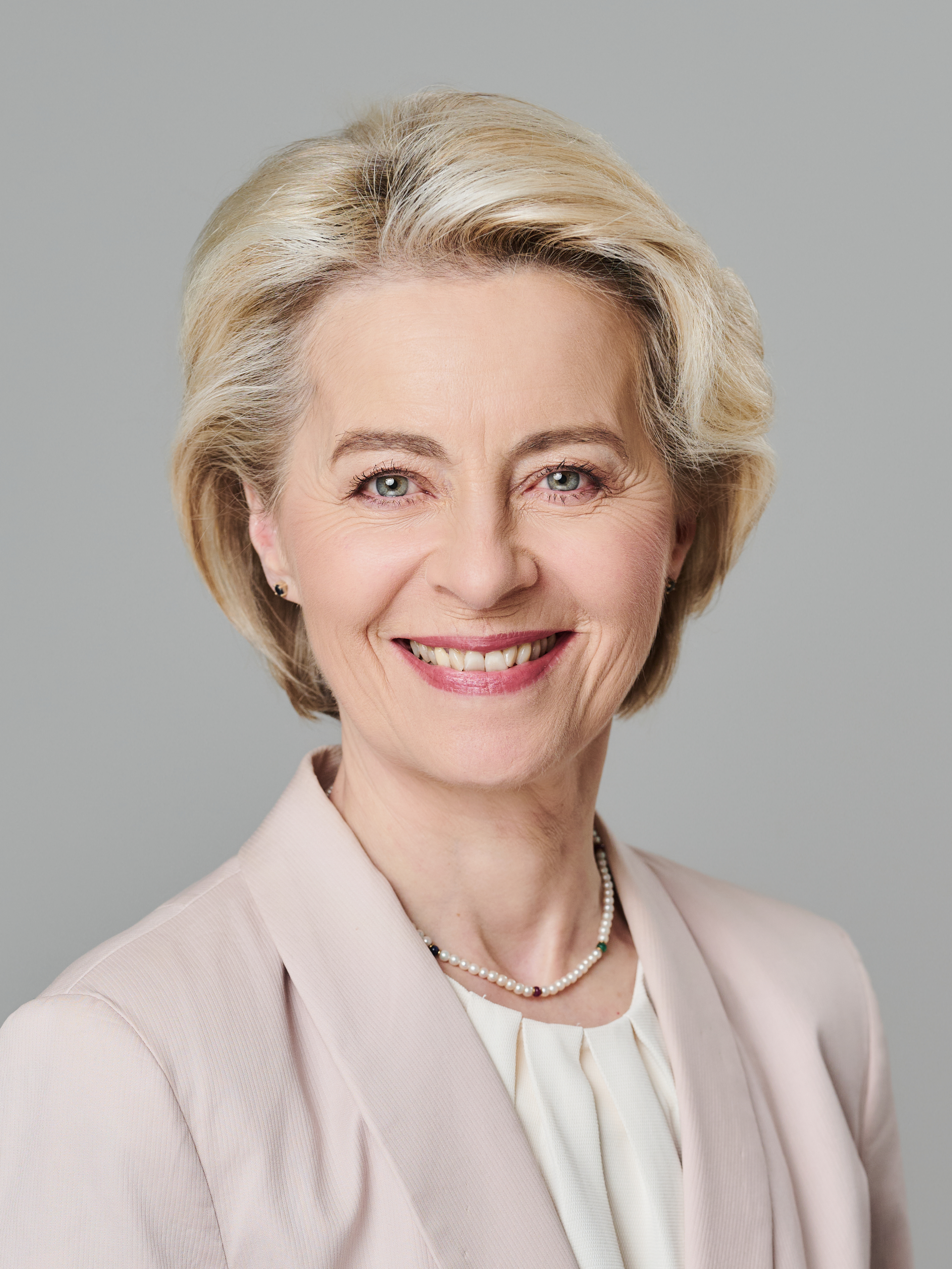
European Union
Ursula von der Leyen, President of the European Commission

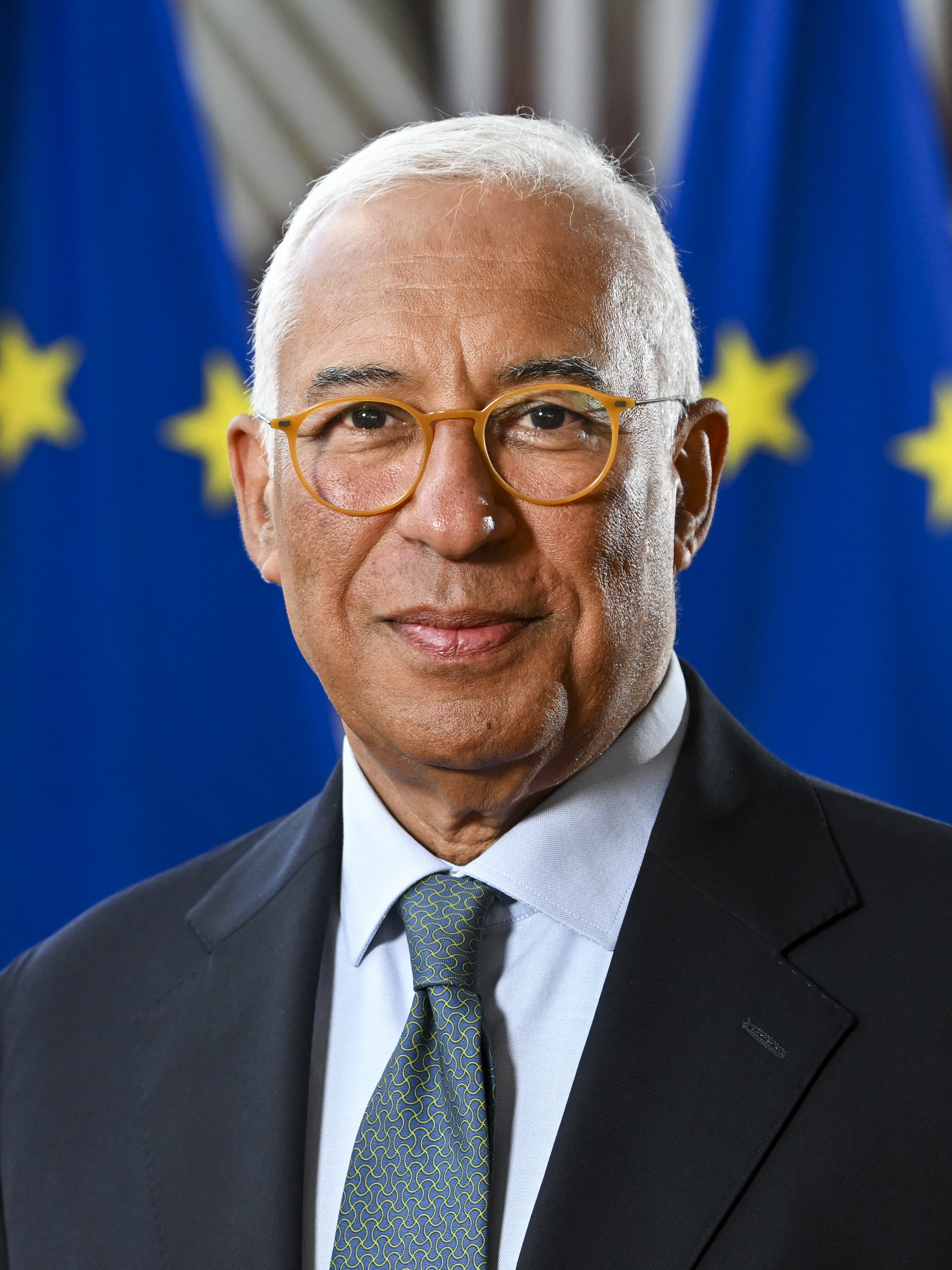
European Union
Antonio Costa, President of the European Council

== Invited guests ==
The following country leaders have been invited to the summit:

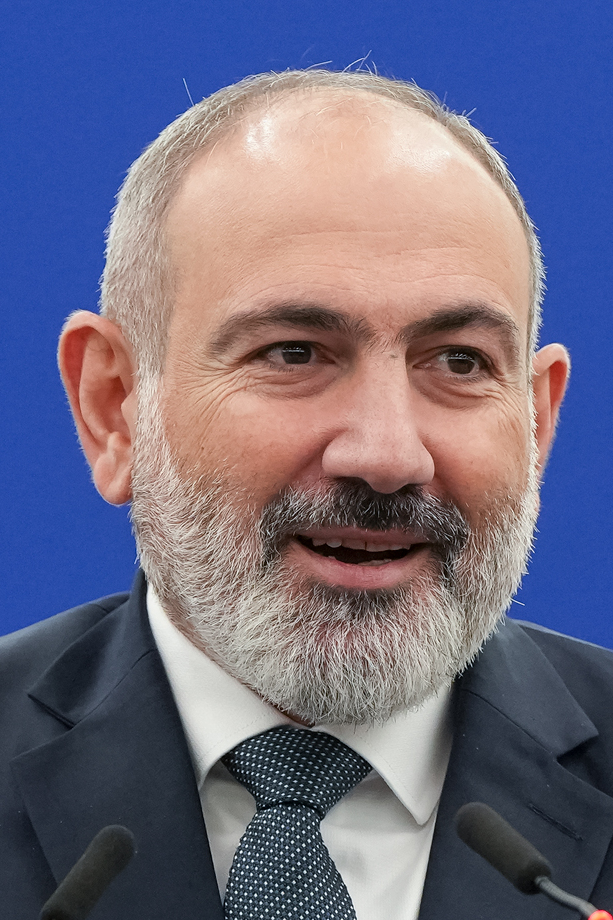
Armenia
Nikol Pashinyan, Prime Minister

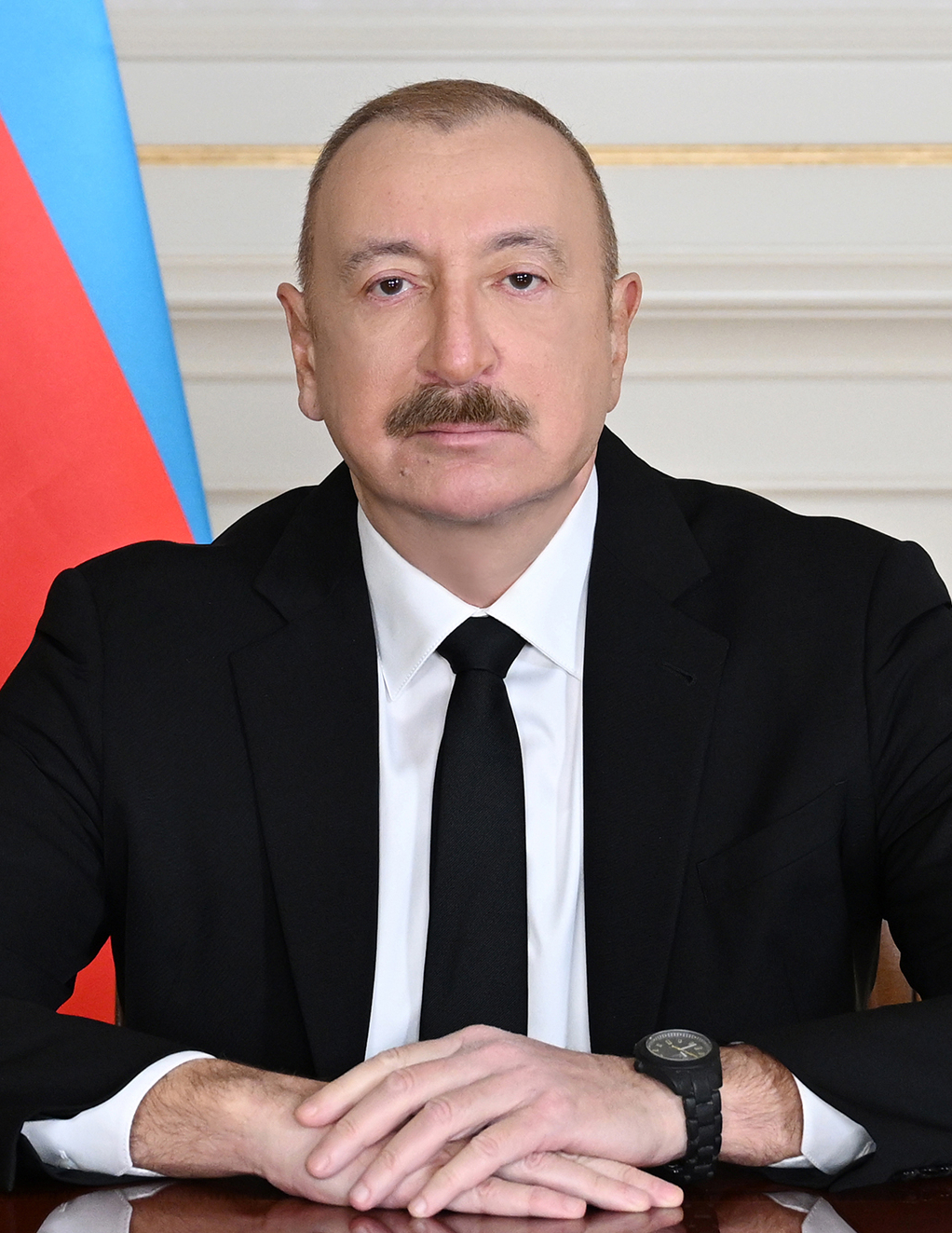
Azerbaijan
Ilham Aliyev,
President

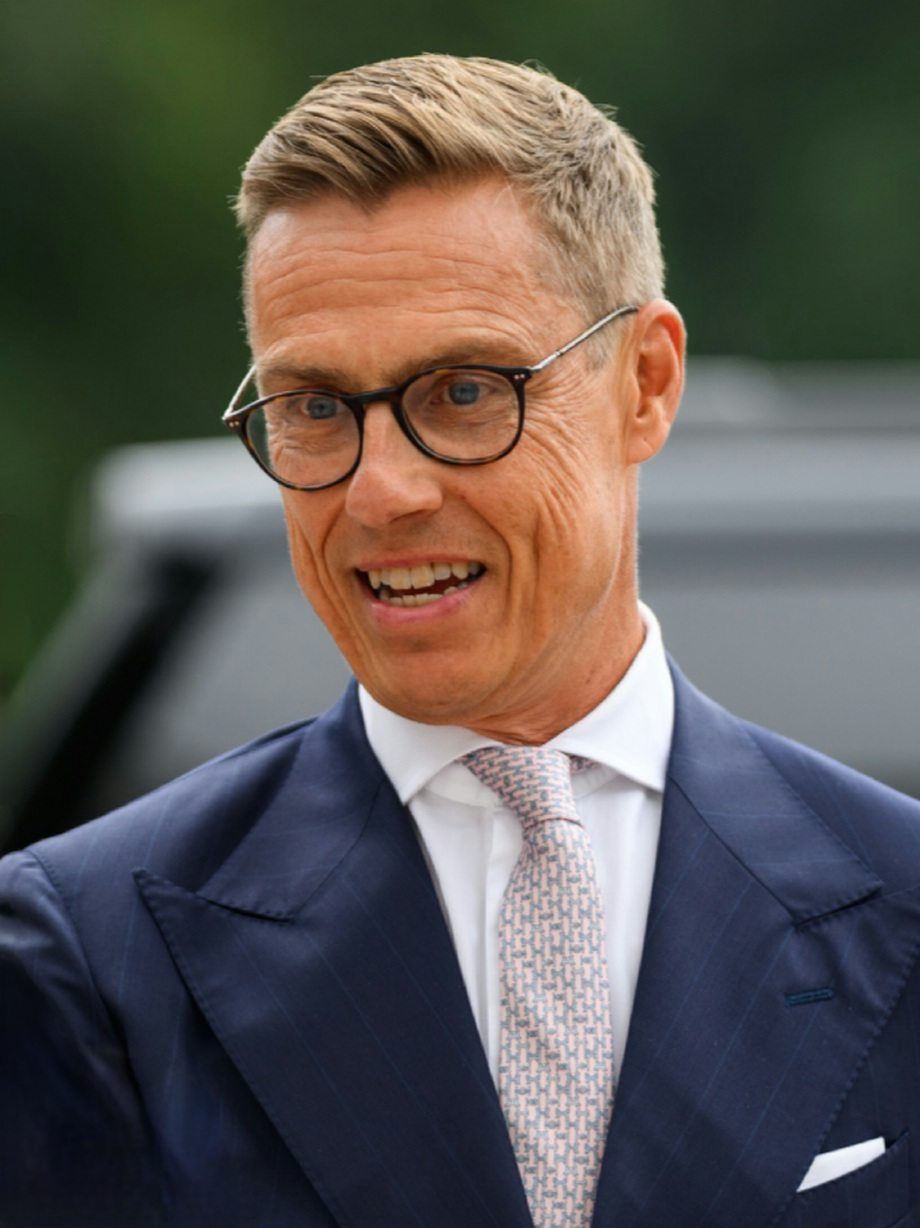
Finland
Alexander Stubb,
President

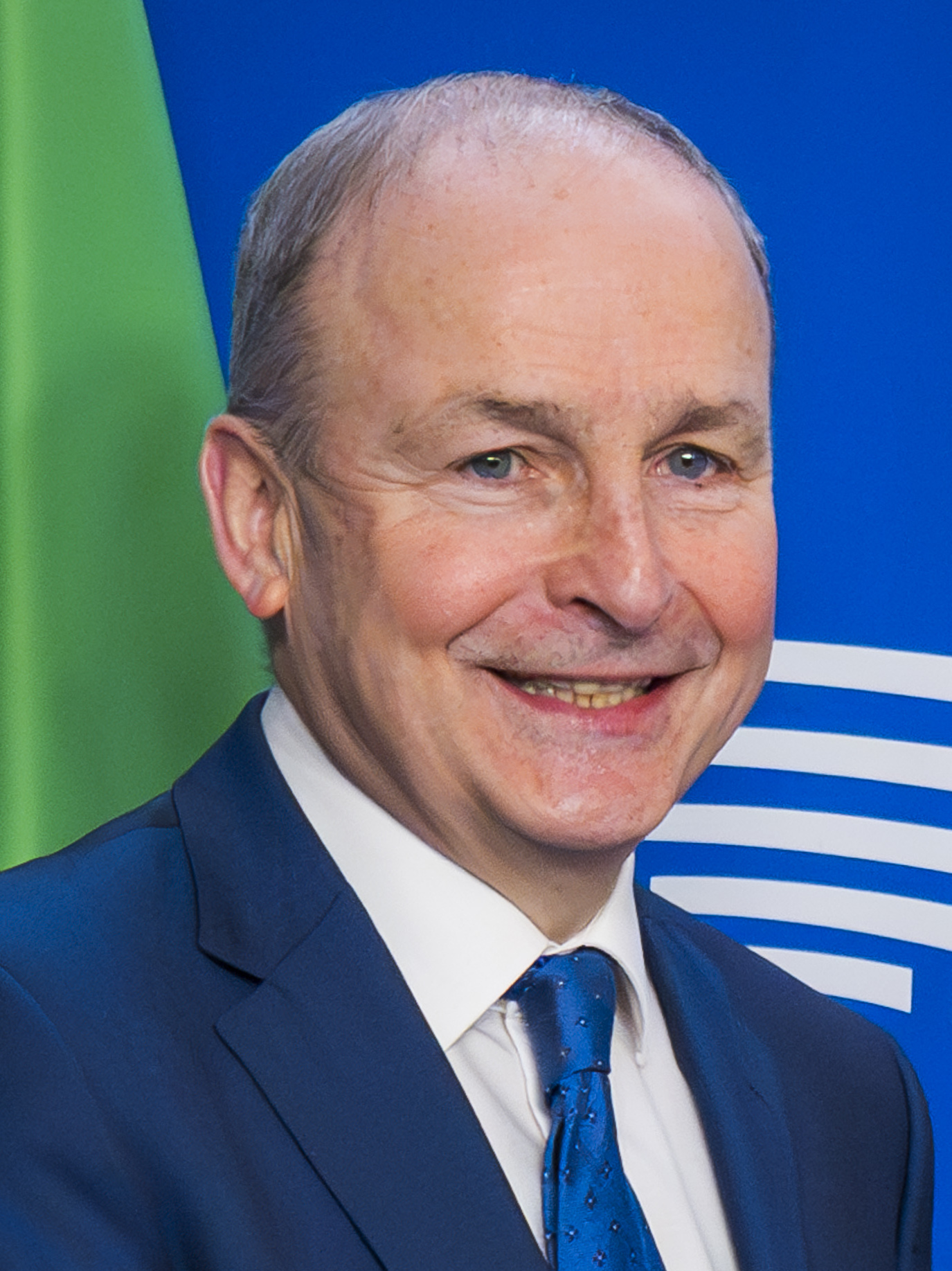
Ireland
Micheál Martin, Taoiseach

Kazakhstan
Kassym-Jomart Tokayev, President

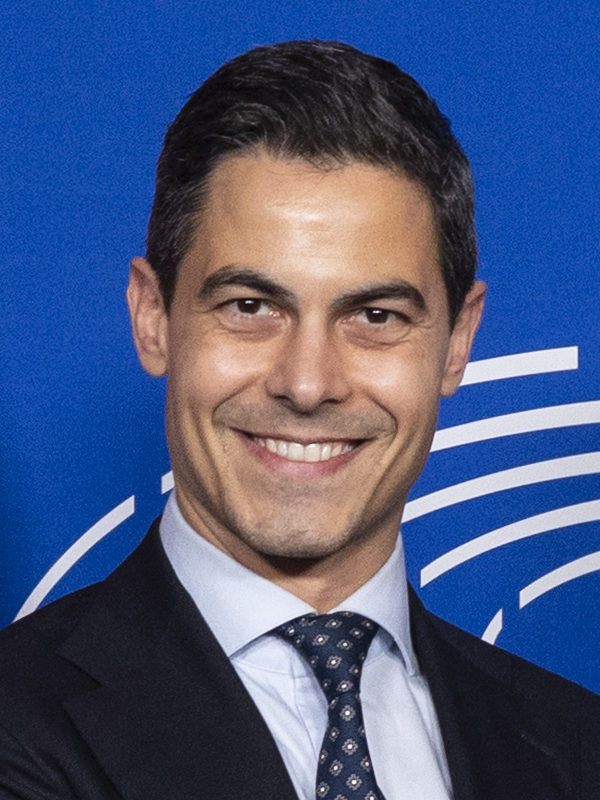
Netherlands
Rob Jetten,
Prime Minister

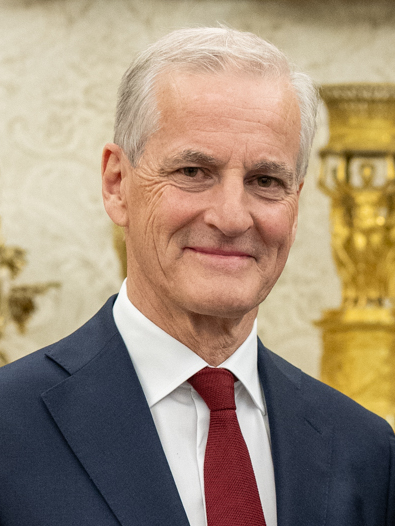
Norway
Jonas Gahr Støre,
Prime Minister

Poland
Karol Nawrocki, President

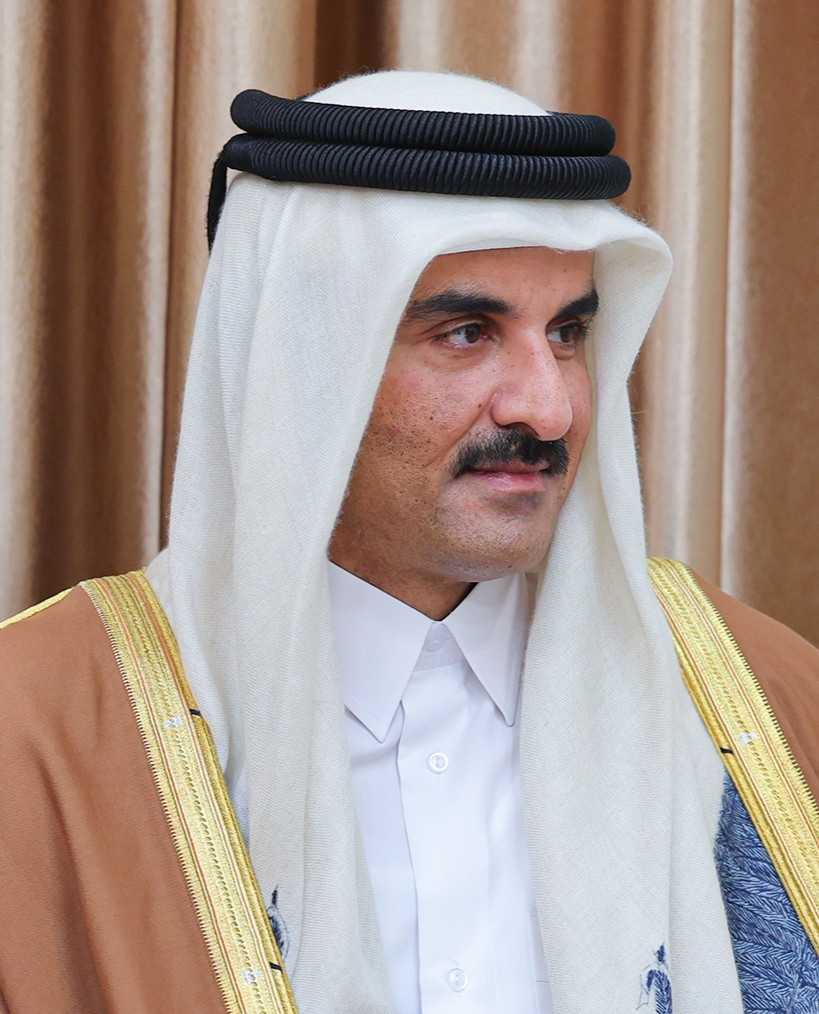
Qatar
Tamim bin Hamad Al Thani,
Emir

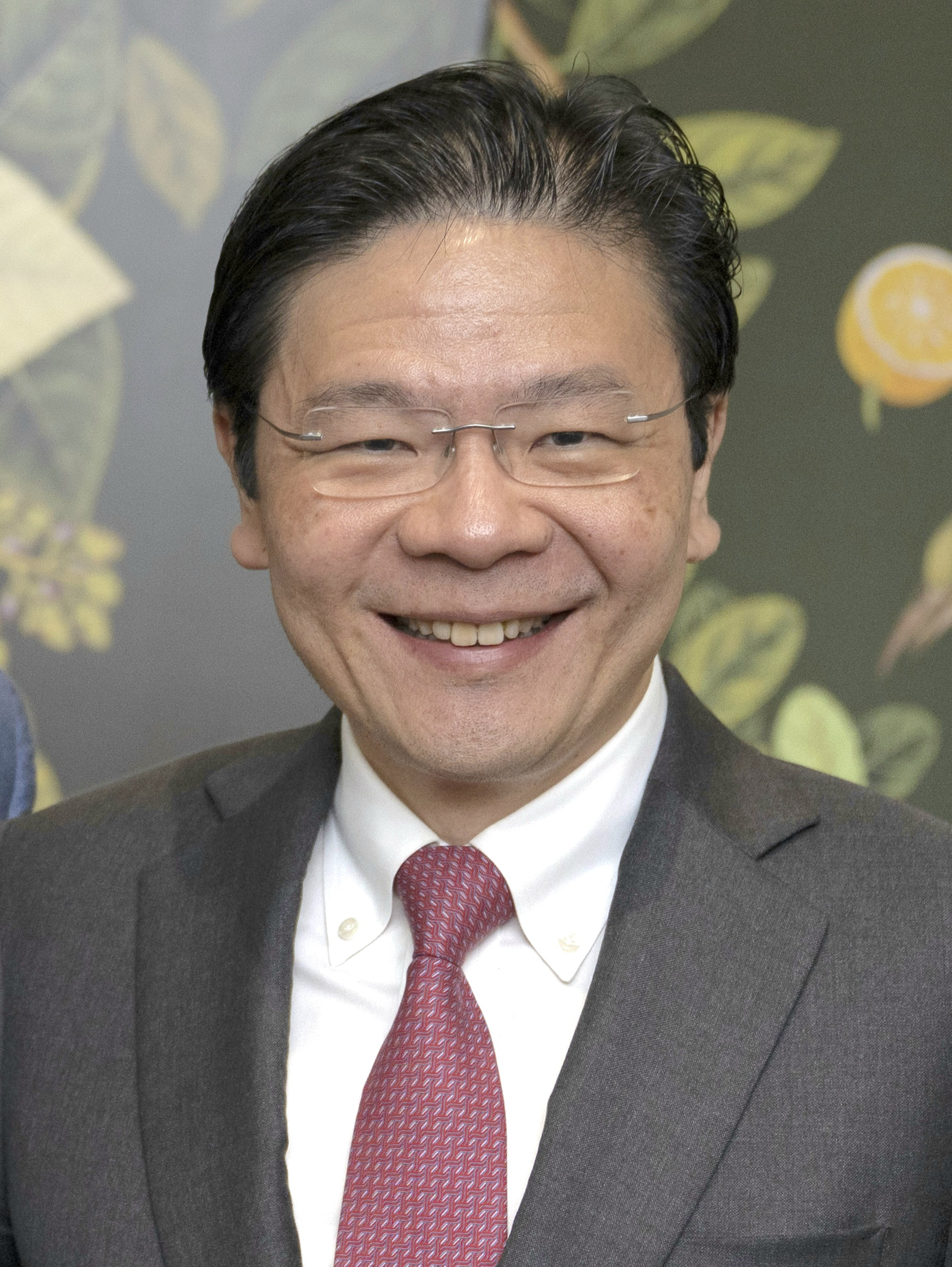
Singapore
Lawrence Wong, Prime Minister

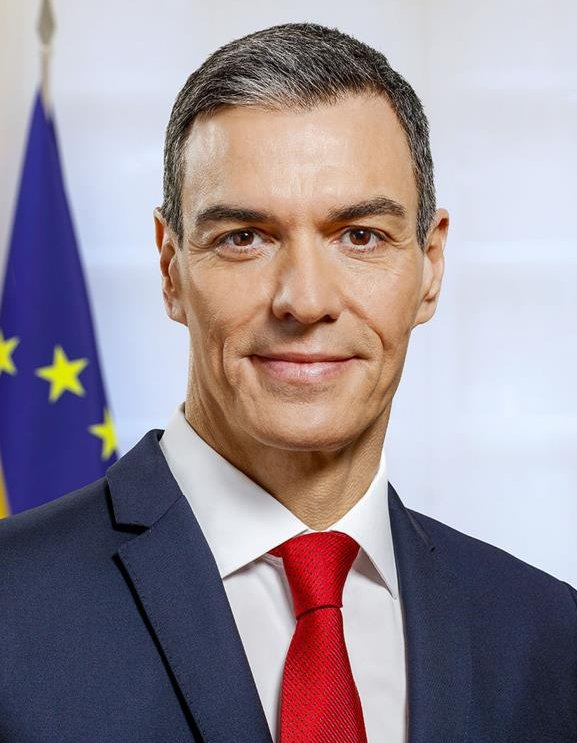
Spain
Pedro Sánchez, Prime Minister

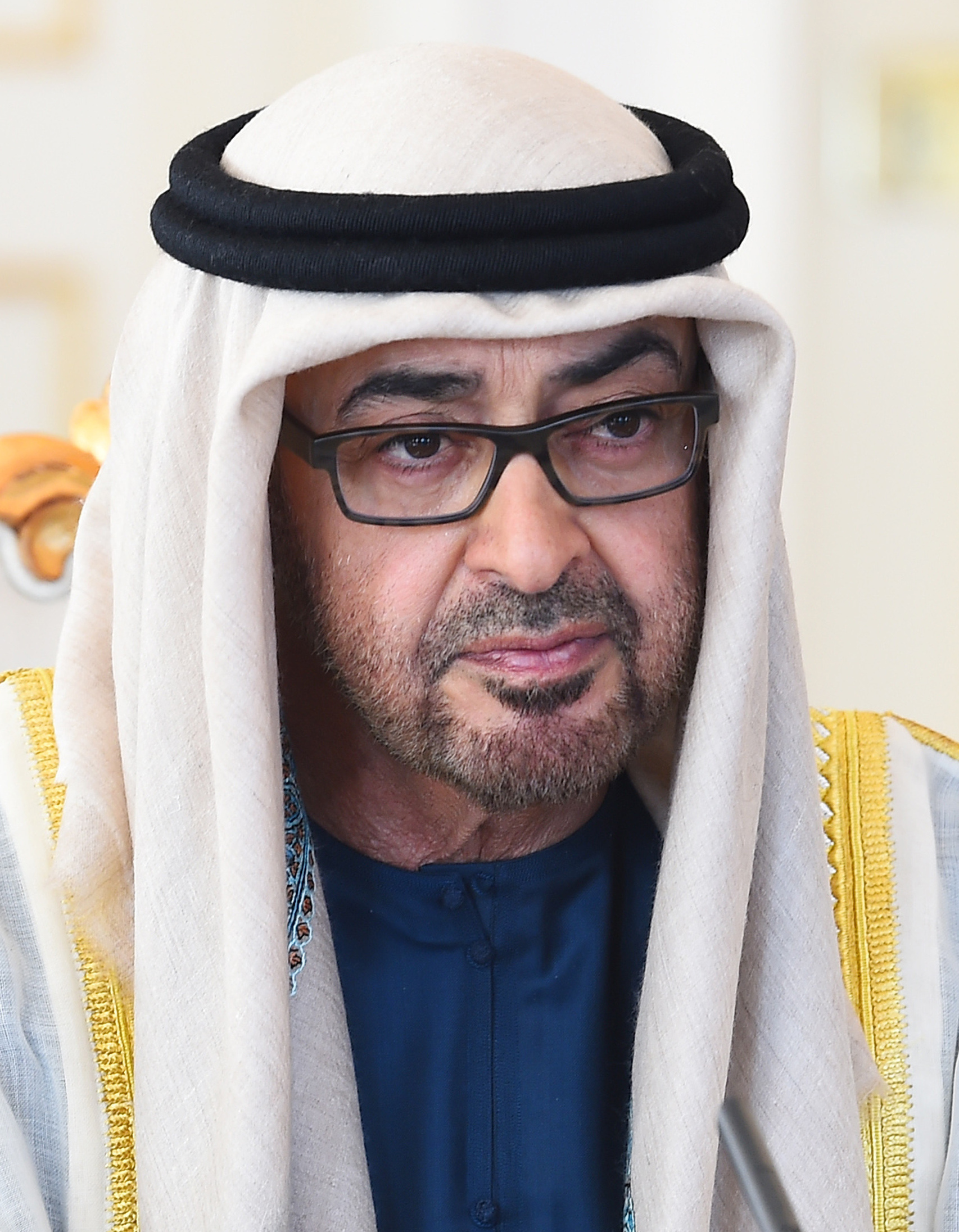
United Arab Emirates
Mohamed bin Zayed Al Nahyan,
President

Uzbekistan
Shavkat Mirziyoyev, President

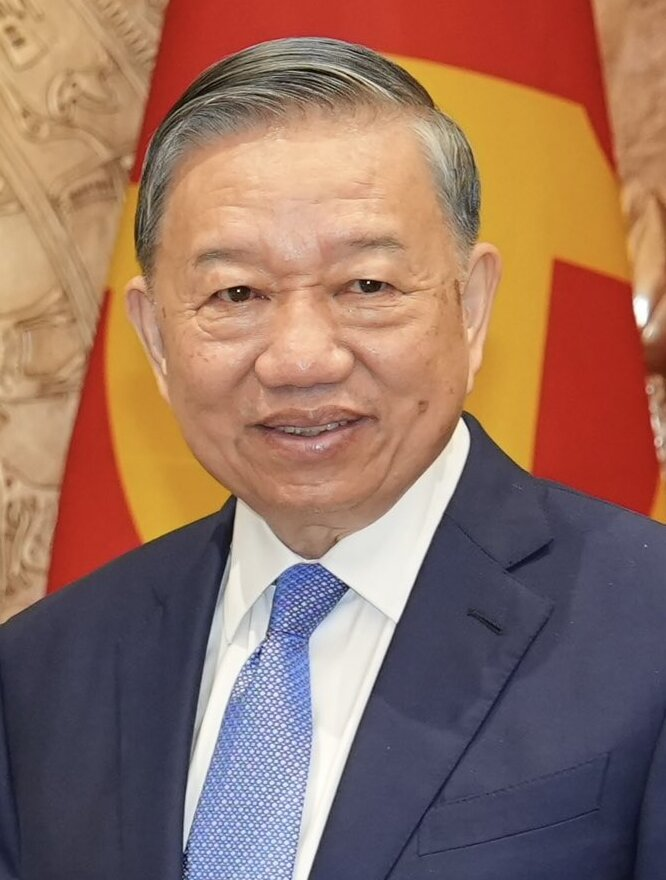
Vietnam
Tô Lâm,
General Secretary and President

== Participants ==
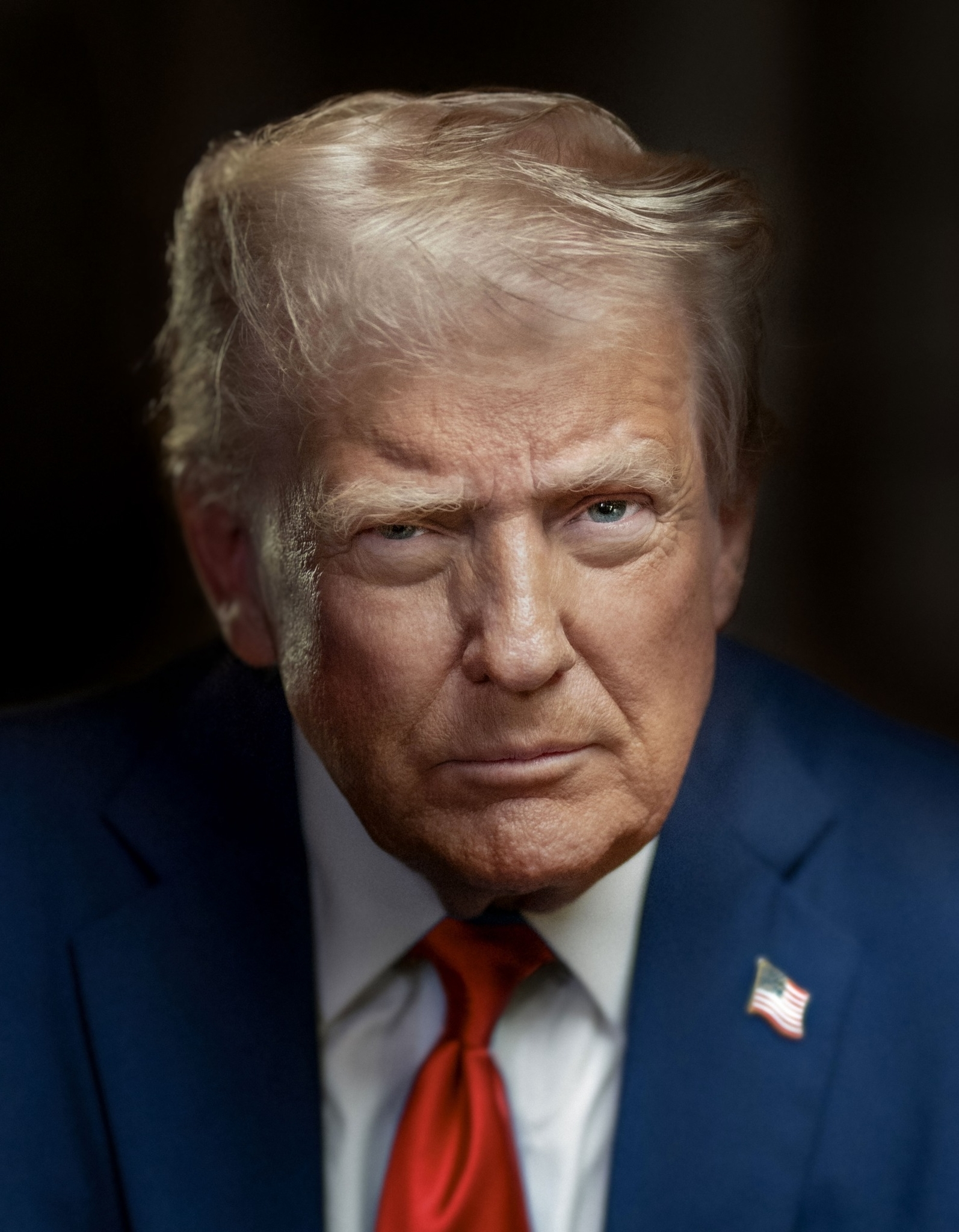
Donald Trump is scheduled to chair the 21st G20 summit.

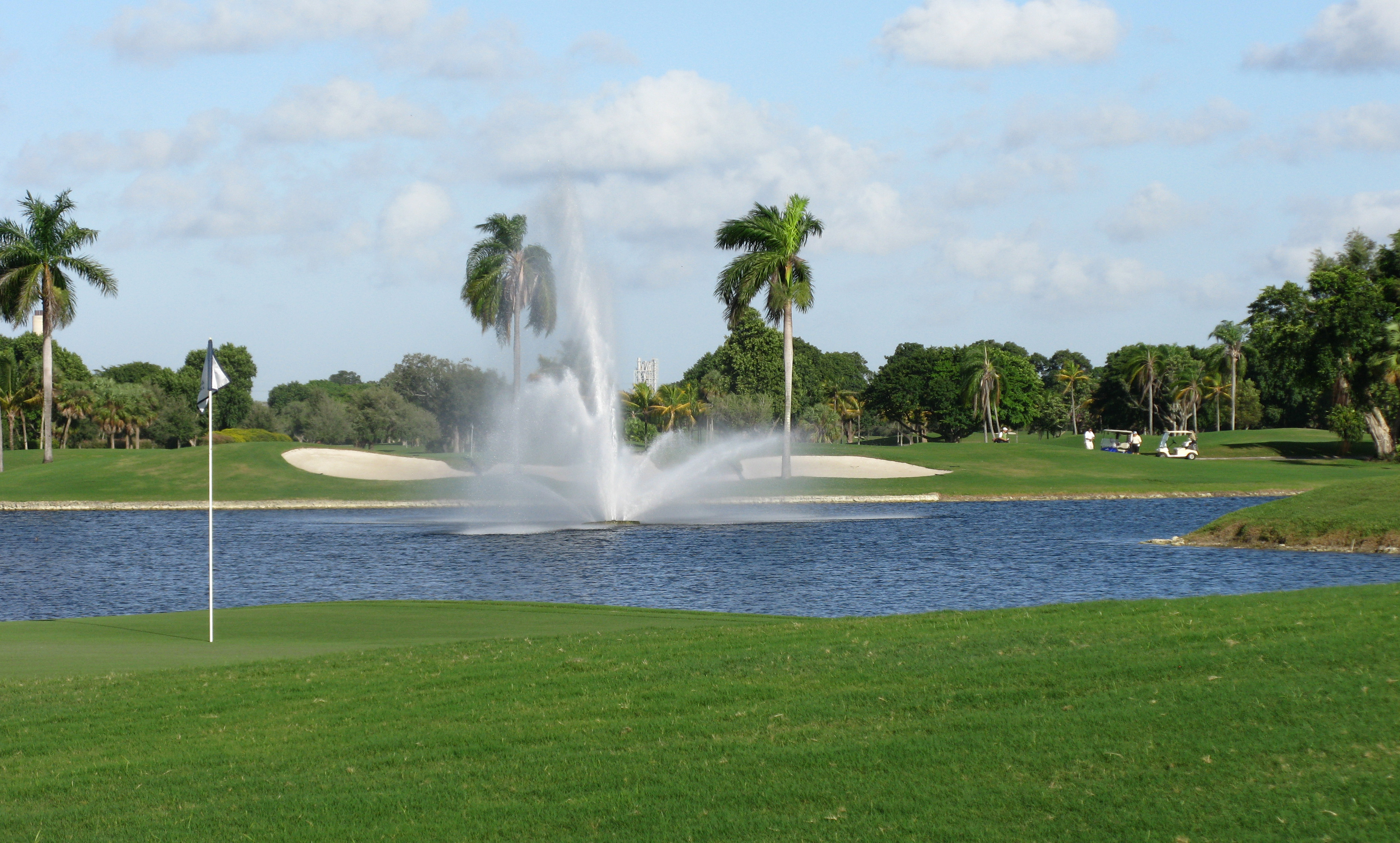
Trump National Doral Miami, the venue of the summit.

=== Expected participating leaders ===
G20 members The host state and leader are shown in bold text.
Member	Represented by	Title
Argentina	Javier Milei	President
Australia	Anthony Albanese	Prime Minister
Brazil	Luiz Inácio Lula da Silva	President
Canada	Mark Carney	Prime Minister
China	Xi Jinping	General Secretary; President
France	Emmanuel Macron	President
Germany	Friedrich Merz	Chancellor
India	Narendra Modi	Prime Minister
Indonesia	Prabowo Subianto	President
Italy	Giorgia Meloni	Prime Minister
Japan	Sanae Takaichi	Prime Minister
Mexico	Claudia Sheinbaum	President
Russia	Vladimir Putin	President
Saudi Arabia	Mohammed bin Salman	Prime Minister
South Korea	Lee Jae Myung	President
Turkey	Recep Tayyip Erdoğan	President
United Kingdom	Andy Burnham	Prime Minister
**United States (host)**	**Donald Trump**	**President**
African Union	Évariste Ndayishimiye	African Union Chairperson
European Union	António Costa	Council President
European Union	Ursula von der Leyen	Commission President
**Invited guests**
Country	Represented by	Title
Azerbaijan	Ilham Aliyev	President
Finland	Alexander Stubb	President
Ireland	Micheál Martin	Taoiseach
Kazakhstan	Kassym-Jomart Tokayev	President
Netherlands	Rob Jetten	Prime Minister
Norway	Jonas Gahr Støre	Prime Minister
Poland	Karol Nawrocki	President
Qatar	Tamim bin Hamad Al Thani	Emir
Singapore	Lawrence Wong	Prime Minister
Spain	Pedro Sánchez	Prime Minister
United Arab Emirates	Mohamed bin Zayed Al Nahyan	President
Uzbekistan	Shavkat Mirziyoyev	President
Vietnam	Tô Lâm	General Secretary; President

=== G20 member not invited ===
Member	Leader	Title	Status
South Africa	Cyril Ramaphosa	President	Not invited by the host government

=== Expected participating leaders ===
G20 members The host state and leader are shown in bold text. Population and economic figures are 2026 estimates. Nominal GDP is expressed in billions of United States dollars.
Member	Represented by	Title	Area (km²)	Population (2026)	Density (per km²)	GDP per capita (PPP, 2026)	Nominal GDP (2026, US$ billion)	HDI	Currency
Argentina	Javier Milei	President	2,780,400	46,003,000	17	$32,600	$680.1 billion	0.865	Argentine peso
Australia	Anthony Albanese	Prime Minister	7,692,024	27,806,000	4	$75,300	$2,120.9 billion	0.958	Australian dollar
Brazil	Luiz Inácio Lula da Silva	President	8,515,767	213,563,000	25	$24,300	$2,635.9 billion	0.786	Brazilian real
Canada	Mark Carney	Prime Minister	9,984,670	40,330,000	4	$67,700	$2,507.3 billion	0.939	Canadian dollar
China	Xi Jinping	General Secretary; President	9,596,961	1,412,914,000	147	$31,300	$20,851.6 billion	0.797	Renminbi
France	Emmanuel Macron	President	643,801	66,650,000	104	$66,500	$3,596.1 billion	0.920	Euro
Germany	Friedrich Merz	Chancellor	357,600	83,900,000	235	$74,500	$5,452.9 billion	0.959	Euro
India	Narendra Modi	Prime Minister	3,287,263	1,476,626,000	449	$12,900	$4,264.8 billion	0.685	Indian rupee
Indonesia	Prabowo Subianto	President	1,904,569	287,887,000	151	$19,300	$1,539.9 billion	0.728	Indonesian rupiah
Italy	Giorgia Meloni	Prime Minister	301,340	58,850,000	195	$63,500	$2,738.2 billion	0.915	Euro
Japan	Sanae Takaichi	Prime Minister	377,975	122,430,000	324	$58,900	$4,379.3 billion	0.925	Japanese yen
Mexico	Claudia Sheinbaum	President	1,964,375	132,997,000	68	$29,500	$2,124.0 billion	0.789	Mexican peso
Russia	Vladimir Putin	President	17,098,246	143,394,000	8	$49,400	$2,656.5 billion	0.832	Russian ruble
Saudi Arabia	Mohammed bin Salman	Prime Minister	2,149,690	35,165,000	16	$80,700	$1,316.0 billion	0.900	Saudi riyal
South Korea	Lee Jae Myung	President	100,210	51,635,000	515	$66,500	$2,120.9 billion	0.937	South Korean won
Turkey	Recep Tayyip Erdoğan	President	783,562	87,927,000	112	$47,500	$1,640.2 billion	0.853	Turkish lira
United Kingdom	Andy Burnham	Prime Minister	243,610	69,932,000	287	$65,500	$4,153.2 billion	0.946	Pound sterling
**United States (host)**	**Donald Trump**	**President**	**9,833,520**	**349,035,000**	**35**	**$92,900**	**$32,383.9 billion**	**0.938**	**United States dollar**
African Union	Évariste Ndayishimiye	African Union Chairperson	30,221,532	1,585,000,000	52	$7,900	$3,300.0 billion	—	Multiple currencies
European Union	António Costa	Council President	4,233,262	451,000,000	107	$64,600	$22,500.0 billion	—	Euro and other currencies
European Union	Ursula von der Leyen	Commission President	4,233,262	451,000,000	107	$64,600	$22,500.0 billion	—	Euro and other currencies
**Invited guests**
Country	Represented by	Title	Area (km²)	Population (2026)	Density (per km²)	GDP per capita (PPP, 2026)	Nominal GDP (2026, US$ billion)	HDI	Currency
Azerbaijan	Ilham Aliyev	President	86,600	10,455,000	121	$25,600	$82.0 billion	0.789	Azerbaijani manat
Finland	Alexander Stubb	President	338,455	5,627,000	17	$66,300	$335.0 billion	0.948	Euro
Ireland	Micheál Martin	Taoiseach	70,273	5,469,000	78	$159,100	$750.0 billion	0.949	Euro
Kazakhstan	Kassym-Jomart Tokayev	President	2,724,900	21,264,000	8	$40,700	$319.0 billion	0.837	Kazakhstani tenge
Netherlands	Rob Jetten	Prime Minister	41,865	18,346,000	438	$90,500	$1,460.0 billion	0.955	Euro
Norway	Jonas Gahr Støre	Prime Minister	385,207	5,666,000	15	$115,500	$570.0 billion	0.970	Norwegian krone
Poland	Karol Nawrocki	President	312,696	37,945,000	121	$55,800	$1,030.0 billion	0.906	Polish złoty
Qatar	Tamim bin Hamad Al Thani	Emir	11,586	3,173,000	274	$112,300	$240.0 billion	0.886	Qatari riyal
Singapore	Lawrence Wong	Prime Minister	735	5,905,000	8,034	$173,700	$606.0 billion	0.946	Singapore dollar
Spain	Pedro Sánchez	Prime Minister	505,990	48,015,000	95	$56,800	$1,931.0 billion	0.918	Euro
United Arab Emirates	Mohamed bin Zayed Al Nahyan	President	83,600	11,287,000	135	$96,500	$590.0 billion	0.940	United Arab Emirates dirham
Uzbekistan	Shavkat Mirziyoyev	President	448,978	37,725,000	84	$12,700	$145.0 billion	0.740	Uzbekistani sum
Vietnam	Tô Lâm	General Secretary; President	331,212	101,599,000	307	$17,000	$506.0 billion	0.766	Vietnamese đồng
