= List of international prime ministerial trips made by Jonas Gahr Støre =

This is a list of international prime ministerial trips made by Jonas Gahr Støre, the current Prime Minister of Norway since 14 October 2021.

== Trips ==
=== Summary ===
Støre has visited 29 countries during his tenure as prime minister. The number of visits per country where Støre has traveled are:

- One visit to Albania, Armenia, the Czech Republic, China, Egypt, Hungary, Japan, Latvia, Moldova, Switzerland, Turkey and the United Arab Emirates
- Two visits to Brazil, Canada, Denmark, Iceland, Lithuania, Netherlands, Poland, South Africa and Spain
- Three visits to Estonia and France
- Four visits to Belgium and Sweden
- Six visits to Finland, Ukraine and the United Kingdom.
- Eight visits to the United States
- Nine visits to Germany

=== 2021 ===
Country	Location(s)	Dates	Details
United Kingdom	Glasgow	2 November	Støre attended the 2021 United Nations Climate Change Conference

=== 2022 ===
Country	Location(s)	Dates	Details
Germany	Berlin	19 January	Støre visited Berlin, where he met with German chancellor Olaf Scholz. They discussed energy cooperation and the ongoing situation in Ukraine.
United States	Washington, D.C.	27 January	Støre met with President Joe Biden and National Security Adviser Jake Sullivan in the Oval Office. They discussed joint efforts, including through NATO and the OSCE, to address Russia's destabilizing military buildup along Ukraine's borders and also discussed enhancing the U.S.-Norway partnership in tackling a range of challenges, including climate change, ending the COVID-19 pandemic and establishing sustainable health security financing, and humanitarian support for Afghanistan.
Belgium	Brussels	24 March	Støre attended an extraordinary NATO summit.
United Kingdom	London	13 May	Met with Prime Minister Boris Johnson
Spain	Madrid	28–30 June	Støre attended the NATO summit.
Ukraine	Kyiv	1 July	Met with President Volodymyr Zelenskyy in Kyiv to discuss strengthening bilateral cooperation and moving toward a strategic partnership between Norway and Ukraine. The talks focused on defense support, energy cooperation, and Ukraine's current needs on the battlefield, as well as continued international coordination and diplomatic efforts. They also addressed sanctions policy, cooperation with European partners, and broader efforts to ensure long-term security and support for Ukraine amid the ongoing war.
United States	New York City	22 September	Støre travelled to New York to attend General debate of the seventy-seventh session of the United Nations General Assembly.
Czech Republic	Prague	6 October	Støre travelled to Prague to attend the inaugural meeting of the European Political Community.
Finland	Helsinki	1 November	Støre travelled to Helsinki again and attended the 74th Session of the Nordic Council. He also held bilateral meetings with Prime Minister of Iceland Katrín Jakobsdóttir and Prime Minister of Sweden Ulf Kristersson.
Germany	Berlin	30 November	Met with Chancellor Olaf Scholz
Latvia	Riga	19 December	Støre attended the 2022 Joint Expeditionary Force summit.

=== 2023 ===
Country	Location(s)	Dates	Details
Germany	Munich	17–19 February	Attended the 59th Munich Security Conference.
Belgium	Ostend	24 April	Støre attended the North Sea Summit.
Finland	Helsinki	3 May	Støre travelled to Finland to meet with Finnish president Sauli Niinistö, Swedish prime minister Ulf Kristersson, Danish prime minister Mette Frederiksen and Icelandic prime minister Katrín Jakobsdóttir. They spoke about security issues, Nordic cooperation and their countries continued strong support for Ukraine. The meeting concluded with a Nordic–Ukrainian summit which was visited by Ukrainian president Volodymyr Zelenskyy.
Iceland	Reykjavík	16–17 May	Støre attended the 4th Council of Europe summit.
Moldova	Mimi Castle, Bulboaca, Chișinău	1 June	Støre travelled to Moldova to attend the 2nd European Political Community Summit.
Iceland	Vestmannaeyjar	25–26 June	Støre travelled to Vestmannaeyjar in Iceland to meet with Nordic prime ministers Katrín Jakobsdóttir (Iceland), Petteri Orpo (Finland), Mette Frederiksen (Denmark) and Ulf Kristersson (Sweden) as well as Canadian prime minister Justin Trudeau and leaders from the Faroe Islands, Greenland and Åland. They discussed security policy, crisis preparedness issues and the green transition.
Lithuania	Rukla, Vilnius	10–12 July	Alongside defence minister Bjørn Arild Gram, Støre announced in July during a visit to Norwegian troops in Lithuania, that their stay would be extended by a year through 2024. Støre travelled to Vilnius to attend the 2023 NATO Vilnius summit.
Finland	Helsinki	13 July	Støre travelled to Helsinki to attend a meeting between the Nordic Prime Ministers Katrín Jakobsdóttir (Iceland), Petteri Orpo (Finland), Mette Frederiksen (Denmark) and Ulf Kristersson (Sweden) and United States President Joe Biden.
Ukraine	Kyiv, Bucha	24 August	Støre arrived in Kyiv for Ukraine's Independence Day. During the visit, he took part in official events, including laying a wreath, meeting with President Volodymyr Zelensky, and visiting the town of Bucha and damaged infrastructure, including the power plant, where he pledged significant assistance, including IRIS-T air defense umbrellas, demining equipment, and energy support.
Canada	Montreal	16 September	Attended Global Progress Action Summit.
United States	Minnesota, New York City	17–21 September	Støre joined Minnesota Sen. Amy Klobuchar for a fireside chat at the Norway House on East Franklin Avenue in Minneapolis. On 19 September, he attended 78th United Nations General Assembly.
Spain	Granada	5 October	Støre attended the 3rd European Political Community Summit.
Sweden	Visby	12–13 October	Støre attended the 2023 Joint Expeditionary Force summit.
Estonia	Tallinn	24 November	Met with Prime Minister Kaja Kallas.
United Arab Emirates	Dubai	1–2 December	Støre attended COP28.
Japan	Tokyo	6–8 December	During the visit, he held talks with Japanese prime minister Fumio Kishida. Both sides discussed strengthening bilateral relations and signed a joint statement on strategic partnership between Norway and Japan.

=== 2024 ===
Country	Location(s)	Dates	Details
Germany	Munich	16–18 February	Attended the 60th Munich Security Conference
Poland	Warsaw	28 February	Støre traveled to Warsaw for a bilateral meeting with Polish prime minister Donald Tusk, followed by a joint press conference. The discussions centered on security policy, Ukraine, European politics, and the Norway–Poland bilateral relationship.
Germany	Hanover	21–22 April	Støre visited Hanover to attend the opening ceremony of the Hannover Messe 2024, where Norway was the official partner country. Together with German chancellor Olaf Scholz and President of the European Commission Ursula von der Leyen, he participated in the opening event and highlighted German–Norwegian cooperation in green industry, renewable energy, hydrogen, digitalisation, and the green transition. On next day he officially opened the Norwegian pavilion at the Hannover Messe together with German chancellor Olaf Scholz and took part in the traditional opening tour of the exhibition. The leaders visited Norwegian, German, and international exhibitors, highlighting cooperation in green industrial transformation, hydrogen, carbon capture and storage, artificial intelligence, and advanced manufacturing technologies. Støre also promoted Norway as the 2024 partner country of the fair and emphasized closer German–Norwegian cooperation in energy, innovation, and industry.
Sweden	Stockholm	13-14 May	Meeting with German chancellor Olaf Scholz, Prime Minister Ulf Kristersson, Danish prime minister Mette Frederiksen, Finnish prime minister Petteri Orpo and Icelandic prime minister Bjarni Benediktsson.
Sweden	Stockholm	31 May	Attended Nordic-Ukrainian summit hosted by Prime Minister Ulf Kristersson. Met with President of Ukraine, Volodymyr Zelenskyy and signed 10-year bilateral security cooperation agreements between Norway and Ukraine.
Switzerland	Lucerne	15–16 June	Støre travelled to Nidwalden to attend the Global peace summit.
United States	Washington, D.C.	9–11 July	Støre attended the 2024 NATO summit
United Kingdom	Woodstock	18 July	Støre attended the 4th European Political Community Summit.
China	Beijing	9 September	Støre visited China in to mark 70 years of diplomatic relations between Norway and China. He also met with President Xi Jinping and premier Li Qiang. He highlighted that China is important partner in trade, artificial intelligence and climate change, but also noted that it was important to secure Norwegian interests. He also showed doubts about reiterating the importance of human rights violations, citing when China cut diplomatic ties back in 2010, further arguing that restarting the countries' former relationship would be challenging.
United States	New York City	22–23 September	Attended Summit of the Future and General debate of the seventy-ninth session of the United Nations General Assembly.
Hungary	Budapest	7 November	Støre attended the 5th European Political Community Summit.
Brazil	Rio de Janeiro	17–19 November	Støre travelled to Rio de Janeiro to attend the G20 summit.
Sweden	Harpsund	26–27 November	Attended Nordic-Baltic Summit hosted by Swedish prime minister Ulf Kristersson.
Estonia	Tallinn	16–17 December	Støre attended the 2024 Joint Expeditionary Force summit.

=== 2025 ===
Country	Location(s)	Dates	Details
Denmark	Copenhagen	26 January	Støre travelled to Copenhagen for an informal dinner with Danish Prime Minister Mette Frederiksen, Swedish Prime Minister Ulf Kristersson and Finnish President Alexander Stubb.
Poland	Oświęcim	27 January	Støre attended the ceremony commemorating the 80th anniversary of the liberation of Auschwitz concentration camp at Auschwitz-Birkenau in Poland alongside Crown Prince Haakon. This was an official commemorative visit.
Germany	Munich	14–16 February	Attended the 61st Munich Security Conference
Ukraine	Kyiv	24 February	Støre travelled to Kyiv to mark the third anniversary of the Russian invasion of Ukraine.
United Kingdom	London	2 March	Støre travelled to London, United Kingdom to attend the Summit on Ukraine
France	Paris	27 March	Støre attended a meeting of the "Coalition of the willing" hosted by President Macron.
Belgium	Brussels	7 April	Met with President of European Commission Ursula von der Leyen.
United States	Washington, D.C.	24 April	Støre visited Washington, D.C., accompanied by finance minister and former NATO Secretary General Jens Stoltenberg and ambassador Anniken Huitfeldt. He held discussions with President of the United States Donald Trump about Norway's role in the Arctic and the northern areas, the war in Ukraine, US–Norway relations and the 15% tariff on Norwegian exports to the US.
Albania	Tirana	16 May	Støre attended the 6th European Political Community Summit.
Finland	Turku	26 May	Støre travalled to Turku to meet with Nordic prime ministers Kristrún Frostadóttir (Iceland), Petteri Orpo (Finland), Mette Frederiksen (Denmark) and Ulf Kristersson (Sweden) as well as German Chancellor Friedrich Merz and leaders from the Faroe Islands (Aksel V. Johannesen), Greenland (Jens-Frederik Nielsen) and Åland (Katrin Sjögren).
Lithuania	Vilnius	2 June	Attended Bucharest Nine Summit.
Netherlands	The Hague	24–25 June	Støre attended the 2025 NATO summit.
Germany	Berlin	21 July	Met with Chancellor Friedrich Merz. They agreed to strengthen cooperation between Norway and Germany in a broad range of areas, including defence and security, industry and the green transition.
Ukraine	Kyiv	25 August	Støre arrived in Ukraine on Monday. Ukrainian foreign minister Andrii Sybiha welcomed him at the railway station in Kyiv. Met with President Volodymyr Zelenskyy.
United States	New York City	25 September	Attended the General debate of the eightieth session of the United Nations General Assembly. Met with President of Syria Ahmed al-Sharaa.
Denmark	Copenhagen	2 October	Attended the 7th European Political Community Summit.
Egypt	Sharm El Sheikh	13 October	Støre attended the Sharm El Sheikh summit which included the signing of the Gaza peace plan to end the Gaza war.
Brazil	Belém	6–7 November	Støre attended the COP30 pre-conference.
South Africa	Johannesburg	22–23 November	Støre attended the 2025 G20 Johannesburg summit.
United Kingdom	London	4 December	Met with Prime Minister Keir Starmer.
Germany	Berlin	14–15 December	Attended a meeting with US envoys Steve Witkoff and Jared Kushner along with Chancellor Friedrich Merz, President of Ukraine Volodymyr Zelenskyy, Prime Minister of Denmark Mette Frederiksen, Prime Minister of Sweden Ulf Kristersson, President of France Emmanuel Macron, President of Finland Alexander Stubb, Prime Minister Donald Tusk, Prime Minister of the United Kingdom Keir Starmer, Prime Minister of the Netherlands Dick Schoof, Prime Minister of Italy Giorgia Meloni, Secretary General of NATO Mark Rutte, President of the European Commission Ursula von der Leyen and President of the European Council António Costa to discuss the Trump peace plan.

=== 2026 ===
Country	Location(s)	Dates	Details
France	Paris	6 January	Støre attended the Coalition of the Willing meeting in Paris with fellow leaders.
Germany	Hamburg	26 January	Støre attended the 2026 North Sea Summit.
Ukraine	Kyiv	24–25 February	Støre travelled to Kyiv to meet President Volodymyr Zelenskyy and join Nordic-Baltic leaders in the coalition of the willing to mark the fourth anniversary of Russia’s full-scale invasion.
Finland	Helsinki	26 March	Støre attended the 2026 JEF Leaders’ Summit.
Armenia	Yerevan	3–4 May	Støre attended the 8th European Political Community Summit.
Estonia	Tallinn	9 June	Attended NB8 Prime Ministers’ Meeting.
Belgium	Brussels	11 June	Støre met with NATO Secretary General Mark Rutte at NATO Headquarters in Brussels to discuss final preparations for the upcoming NATO Summit in Ankara. The talks focused on Norway's contributions to NATO security, including activities in the Arctic and High North, defence spending, and cooperation within the Alliance. The meeting also addressed continued support for Ukraine, with discussions covering Norway's military and financial assistance, contributions to the Prioritised Ukraine Requirements List (PURL), and recent Norway–Ukraine defence cooperation initiatives, including support for drone production.
Turkey	Ankara	7–8 July	Støre attended the 2026 Ankara NATO summit.
France	Paris	13 July	Støre travelled to Paris to attend a meeting with heads of state and government within the Coalition of the Willing.
Ukraine	Kyiv	23 August	Jonas Gahr Støre, together with Lithuanian president Gitanas Nausėda, Finnish president Alexander Stubb, Latvian prime minister Andris Kulbergs, Estonian prime minister Kristen Michal and Danish prime minister Mette Frederiksen, met unannounced with Ukrainian president Volodymyr Zelenskyy and Ukrainian prime minister Serhii Koretskyi on the sidelines of the NB8 summit in Kyiv to discuss winter preparations, protection and restoration of key energy infrastructure, and preparations for the Ukrainian reconstruction conference to be held in Tallinn in January next year. Jonas Gahr Støre and the leaders participated in events related to the Ukrainian National Flag Day.
Netherlands	Domburg, Sluiskil and Middelburg	7 September	Jonas Gahr Støre in Sluiskil, attended the opening of Yara's new carbon capture and storage (CCS) facility together with Dutch Prime Minister Rob Jetten. In Middelburg, Støre and Jetten held a bilateral meeting and signed a joint declaration establishing a strategic partnership between Norway and the Netherlands, covering cooperation on security and defence, energy, economic security, digitalisation and emerging technologies. They also discussed the war in Ukraine and the situation in the Middle East. Støre additionally visited a Norwegian war memorial in Domburg commemorating Norwegian commandos who died during the liberation of the Netherlands in World War II.
Finland	Rovaniemi	13–14 September	Jonas Gahr Støre is travelled the European Arctic Summit.
Canada	Ottawa	20 September	Met with Prime Minister Mark Carney to reaffirm the Canada–Norway partnership and discuss cooperation on Arctic security and defence, critical minerals, energy, science, emerging technologies, space, climate and oceans, and support for Ukraine. The leaders also announced their intention to pursue an enhanced defence cooperation agreement and welcomed the establishment of an Arctic dialogue and increased cooperation in Arctic research. They also discussed industrial and economic cooperation, including the Canadian decision to join the German-Norwegian Type 212CD submarine programme.
United States	New York City	23 September	Støre attended the 81st United Nations General Assembly.
United Kingdom	Liverpool	27 September	Met with Prime Minister Andy Burnham for a bilateral meeting in the Royal Liver Building.

== Future trips ==
Country	Location	Date	Details
Hungary	Budapest	22-23 October	Støre is plan to attend the 70th Anniversary Commemoration Ceremony Hungarian Revolution of 1956.
Ireland	Dublin	12 November	Støre is plan to attend the 9th European Political Community Summit.
Turkey	Antalya	November	Støre is scheduled to attend the 2026 United Nations Climate Change Conference.
United States	Miami	14–15 December	Støre is scheduled to attend the G20 summit.

== Multilateral meetings ==
Jonas Gahr Støre participated in the following summits during his premiership:

Group	Year								
Group	2021	2022	2023	2024	2025	2026	2027	2028	2029
UNGA		22 September, (United States) New York City	19 September, (United States) New York City	23 September, (United States) New York City	25 September, (United States) New York City	23 September, (United States) New York City	TBD, (United States) New York City	TBD, (United States) New York City	TBD, (United States) New York City
G20	Not a G20 Member			18–19 November, (Brazil) Rio de Janeiro	22–23 November, (South Africa) Johannesburg	TBD, (United States) TBD	TBD	TBD	TBD
NATO		24 March, (Belgium) Brussels	11–12 July, (Lithuania) Vilnius	9–11 July, (United States) Washington, D.C.	24–25 June, (Netherlands) The Hague	7–8 July, (Turkey) Ankara	TBD, (Albania) Tirana	TBD	TBD
NATO		28–30 June, (Spain) Madrid	11–12 July, (Lithuania) Vilnius	9–11 July, (United States) Washington, D.C.	24–25 June, (Netherlands) The Hague	7–8 July, (Turkey) Ankara	TBD, (Albania) Tirana	TBD	TBD
UNCCC	1–2 November (United Kingdom) Glasgow	11 November (Egypt) Sharm el-Sheikh	1–2 December (United Arab Emirates) Dubai	12 November (Azerbaijan) Baku	6–7 November, (Brazil) Belém	November, (Turkey) Antalya	TBD	TBD	TBD
JEF	None	14–15 March, (United Kingdom) London	12–13 October, (Sweden) Visby	16–17 December, (Estonia) Tallinn	9 May, (Norway) Oslo	26 March, (Finland) Helsinki	(Iceland) Reykjavík	TBD	TBD
JEF	None	19 December, (Latvia) Riga	12–13 October, (Sweden) Visby	16–17 December, (Estonia) Tallinn	9 May, (Norway) Oslo	26 March, (Finland) Helsinki	(Iceland) Reykjavík	TBD	TBD
North Sea Summit	Didn't exist	18 May, (Denmark) Esbjerg	24 April, (Belgium) Ostend	None		26 January, (Germany) Hamburg	TBA	TBA	TBA
EPC	Didn't exist	6 October, (Czech Republic) Prague	1 June, (Moldova) Bulboaca	18 July, (United Kingdom) Woodstock	16 May, (Albania) Tirana	4 May, (Armenia) Yerevan	TBD, (Switzerland) TBD	TBD, (Azerbaijan) TBD	TBD
EPC	Didn't exist	6 October, (Czech Republic) Prague	5 October, (Spain) Granada	7 November, (Hungary) Budapest	2 October, (Denmark) Copenhagen	12 November, (Republic of Ireland) Dublin	TBD, (Greece) TBD	TBD, (Latvia) TBD	TBD, (Netherlands) TBD
Others	None	None	None	Global Peace Summit; 15–16 June, (Switzerland) Lucerne	Securing our future 2 March, (United Kingdom) London	Together for peace and security summit 6 January, (France) Paris	TBA	TBA	TBA
Others	None	None	None	Global Peace Summit; 15–16 June, (Switzerland) Lucerne	15 March, (videoconference); United Kingdom	Determined to act 13 July, (France) Paris	TBA	TBA	TBA
Others	None	None	None	Global Peace Summit; 15–16 June, (Switzerland) Lucerne	Building a robust peace for Ukraine and Europe; 27 March, (France) Paris	Determined to act 13 July, (France) Paris	TBA	TBA	TBA
Others	None	None	None	Global Peace Summit; 15–16 June, (Switzerland) Lucerne	Bucharest Nine; 2 June, (Lithuania) Vilnius	Determined to act 13 July, (France) Paris			
██ = Future event ██ = Did not attend / participate.^aMinister for Foreign Affairs Espen Barth Eide attended in the prime minister's place.^bMinister of International Development Anne Beathe Tvinnereim attended in the prime minister's place.
