= List of international prime ministerial trips made by Petr Fiala =

This is a list of international prime ministerial trips made by Petr Fiala, the current Prime Minister of the Czech Republic since 28 November 2021.

== Summary ==
Fiala has visited 20 countries during his tenure as prime minister. The number of visits per country where Fiala has traveled are:

- One visit to Hungary, India, Israel, Lithuania, Moldova, Philippines, Slovakia, United Arab Emirates and United States
- Two visits to Albania, Germany, Poland, Spain, Ukraine and Vatican City
- Three visits to France
- Five visits to the United Kingdom
- Ten visits to Belgium

Czech Republic One Visit Two Visits Three Visits Five Visits

== 2022 ==
Country	Location(s)	Dates	Details
Slovakia	Bratislava	11 January	Met with Prime Minister Eduard Heger. It also was his first foreign trip.
Belgium	Brussels	24 February	Fiala attended a special meeting of the European Council to discuss the Russian invasion of Ukraine.
United Kingdom	London	8 March	Fiala attended a meeting between V4 leaders and British prime minister Boris Johnson in London on Tuesday, 8 March 2022. The main topic of the meeting was European security in the context of the Russian invasion of Ukraine. He then discussed in bilateral negotiations with Boris Johnson mutual relations between the two countries, defense cooperation and trade.
France	Versailles	10–11 March	Participation in the informal meeting of EU Heads of State and Government.
Ukraine	Kyiv	15 March	Travelled to Kyiv together with Prime Minister of Poland Mateusz Morawiecki, Deputy Prime Minister of Poland Jarosław Kaczyński and Prime Minister of Slovenia Janez Janša to meet with President Volodymyr Zelenskyy.
Belgium	Brussels	24–25 March	Fiala attended an extraordinary NATO summit. He also attended the European Council.
Poland	Warsaw	29 April	Met with Polish prime minister Mateusz Morawiecki in Warsaw. They talked about the war in Ukraine and its impact on the European Union and the steps taken by both countries in this context. They also discussed energy security, Czech-Polish co-operation and preparations for the Czech EU Presidency.
Germany	Berlin	5 May	Met with Chancellor Olaf Scholz. They discussed close coordination among EU and NATO partners regarding the Russian war of aggression against Ukraine, as well as other bilateral, European, foreign and economic policy issues.
Belgium	Brussels	23–24 June	Fiala attended in Brussels an EU-Western Balkans Leaders meeting and a European Council.
Spain	Madrid	28–30 June	Fiala attended the NATO summit.
United Kingdom	London	18–19 September	Attendance to the state funeral of Elizabeth II
Belgium	Brussels	20–21 October	Fiala attended the European Council.
Ukraine	Kyiv	31 October	Met with President Volodymyr Zelenskyy.
Albania	Tirana	6 December	Attended EU-Western Balkans summit
Belgium	Brussels	15 December	Fiala attended the European Council.

== 2023 ==
Country	Location(s)	Dates	Details
Vatican City	Vatican City	5 January	Attended the funeral service of former Pope Benedict XVI.
United Arab Emirates	Abu Dhabi	23–25 February	
Philippines	Manila	16–18 April	Official visit
Moldova	Mimi Castle, Bulboaca, Chișinău	1 June	Fiala travelled to Moldova to attend the 2nd European Political Community Summit.
Belgium	Brussels	17-18 July	Attended the 3rd EU–CELAC summit
Spain	Granada	5 October	Fiala attended the 3rd European Political Community Summit.
Israel	Tel Aviv	25 October	

== 2024 ==
Country	Location(s)	Dates	Details
India	Gandhinagar	9–11 January	Attended 2024 Vibrant Gujarat Global Summit.
Lithuania	Rukla, Vilnius	2 April	He visited the NATO enhanced Forward Presence Battleground in Rukla to meet with Czech soldiers stationed in Lithuania. He travelled to Vilnius to attend a working dinner on the invitation of Lithuanian president Gitanas Nausėda and President of the European Council Charles Michel. The dinner focused on European future issues such as European Union Aid to Ukraine, potential enlargement of the European Union, competitiveness and migration and asylum policy.
United States	Washington, D.C.	15 April	Fiala holds a bilateral meeting with President Joe Biden at the White House.
Belgium	Brussels	17–18 April	Fiala attended an extraordinary European Council meeting. Together with Prime Minister of the Netherlands, Mark Rutte, the prime minister of Denmark, Mette Frederiksen travelled to NATO headquarters to meet with Secretary General of NATO Jens Stoltenberg. They discussed the situation in Ukraine and agreed that NATO should have a greater role in coordinating security assistance and training for Ukraine over the longer term.
United Kingdom	Woodstock	18 July	Fiala attended the 4th European Political Community Summit.
France	Paris	26 July	Fiala travelled to Paris to attend the 2024 Summer Olympics opening ceremony.
Poland	Wrocław	19 September	Fiala came to Wrocław at the invitation of Prime Minister Donald Tusk together with the president of the European Commission Ursula von der Leyen, Austrian chancellor Karl Nehammer and the prime minister of Slovakia Robert Fico.
Hungary	Budapest	7 November	Fiala attended the 5th European Political Community Summit.

== 2025 ==
Country	Location(s)	Dates	Details
Belgium	Brussels	3 February	Fiala attended an informal European Council summit.
United Kingdom	London	2 March	Fiala travelled to London, United Kingdom to attend the Summit on Ukraine
Belgium	Brussels	20–21 March	Fiala attended a European Council summit.
France	Paris	27 March	Fiala attended a meeting of the "Coalition of the willing" hosted by President Macron.
Albania	Tirana	16 May	Fiala attended the 6th European Political Community Summit.
Vatican City	Vatican City	26 April	Fiala attended the funeral of Pope Francis.
Belgium	Brussels	26–27 June	Fiala attended the European Council meeting.
United Kingdom	London	14 July	Fiala met with UK PM Keir Starmer in London and at Downing Street to discuss energy, trade, and defence issues.
Germany	Berlin	21 July	Met with Chancellor Friedrich Merz. Their key topics are defence cooperation, energy, transport, and continued support for Ukraine.

== Multilateral meetings ==
Petr Fiala participated in the following summits during his premiership:

Group	Year			
Group	2022	2023	2024	2025
NATO	24 March, (Belgium) Brussels	Not invited		
NATO	28–30 June, (Spain) Madrid	Not invited		
EU–CELAC	None	17–18 July, (Belgium) Brussels	None	TBA
EPC	6 October, (Czech Republic) Prague	1 June, (Moldova) Bulboaca	18 July, (United Kingdom) Woodstock	16 May, (Albania) Tirana
EPC	6 October, (Czech Republic) Prague	5 October, (Spain) Granada	7 November, (Hungary) Budapest	2 October, (Denmark) Copenhagen
Others	None	None	None	Securing our future 2 March, (United Kingdom) London
Others	None	None	None	15 March, (videoconference); United Kingdom
Others	None	None	None	Building a robust peace for Ukraine and Europe; 27 March, (France) Paris
██ = Future event ██ = Did not attend / participate.
