= List of international presidential trips made by Nikos Christodoulides =

This is a list of international presidential trips made by Nikos Christodoulides, the current president of Cyprus since 28 February 2023.

== Summary ==
Christodoulides has visited 23 countries during his tenure as President. The number of visits per country where Christodoulides has traveled are:

- One visit to Albania, Armenia, Denmark, Egypt, Finland, Greece, Hungary, Iceland, India, Ireland, Kazakhstan, Latvia, Moldova, Montenegro, Slovenia, Spain, Ukraine
- Two visits to Croatia, France, and Israel
- Three visits to the United Kingdom
- Four visits to Germany
- Five visits to the United States
- Twelve visits to Belgium

== 2023 ==
Country	Location(s)	Dates	Details
Greece	Athens	13–14 March	First official visit. Met President Katerina Sakellaropoulou and Prime Minister Kyriakos Mitsotakis.
United Kingdom	London	6 May	Christodoulides travelled to London to attend the coronation of King Charles III.
Israel	Jerusalem	11–12 May	Met with President Isaac Herzog and Prime Minister Benjamin Netanyahu to strengthen bilateral ties. Discussions prioritized energy cooperation, regional stability, and the Cyprus problem, with Herzog hailing the visit as a sign of solidarity during ongoing regional tension.
Iceland	Reykjavík	16–17 May	Christodoulides attended the 4th Council of Europe summit.
Germany	Berlin	25 May	Met with Chancellor Olaf Scholz. The meeting was focus on bilateral, international, and European policy issues.
Moldova	Mimi Castle, Bulboaca, Chișinău	1 June	Christodoulides travelled to Moldova to attend the 2nd European Political Community Summit.
Belgium	Brussels	29 June	Attended European People's Party summit. Met with President of the European Commission Ursula von der Leyen.
Belgium	Brussels	17–18 July	Attended the 3rd EU–CELAC summit.
United States	New York City	17-22 September	Christodoulides is attended the 78th United Nations General Assembly.
Spain	Granada	5 October	Christodoulides attended the 3rd European Political Community Summit.
Israel	Jerusalem	21 October	Met with Prime Minister Benjamin Netanyahu and President Isaac Herzog in Jerusalem, where discussions focused on the escalating situation in the region and the need for de-escalation. He conveyed messages aimed at reducing tensions and emphasized the importance of diplomatic efforts, humanitarian considerations, and regional stability following the outbreak of violence between Israel and Hamas. The talks also addressed the broader security situation in the Middle East and the role of international partners in preventing further escalation.
Belgium	Brussels	26 October	Attended the European Council summit.
Germany	Berlin	13 November	Christodoulides met with Chancellor Olaf Scholz and President of the European Council Charles Michel during a Strategic Agenda consultation at the German Chancellery. The meeting was also attended by Austrian Chancellor Karl Nehammer, Belgian Prime Minister Alexander De Croo, Greek Prime Minister Kyriakos Mitsotakis, Hungarian Prime Minister Viktor Orbán, and President of Lithuania Gitanas Nausėda. The leaders discussed priorities for the European Union's next institutional cycle, including security and defence, competitiveness, energy, migration, enlargement, and institutional reforms.
Belgium	Brussels	13–15 December	Christodoulides attended the EU-Western Balkans summit followed by the European Council.

== 2024 ==
Country	Location(s)	Dates	Details
Belgium	Brussels	21 March	Christodoulides attended the European Council summit.
Belgium	Brussels	17 April	Christodoulides attended an extraordinary European Council summit.
Belgium	Brussels	17 June	Christodoulides attended an informal European Council summit.
France	Paris	26 July	Christodoulides travelled to Paris to attend the 2024 Summer Olympics opening ceremony.
United States	New York City	22-27 September	Christodoulides is attended the 79th United Nations General Assembly.
United Kingdom	London	14 October	Met with Prime Minister Keir Starmer.
United States	Washington, D.C.	30 October	Christodoulides holds a bilateral meeting with President Joe Biden at the White House.
Hungary	Budapest	7 November	Christodoulides attended the 5th European Political Community Summit.

== 2025 ==
Country	Location(s)	Dates	Details
Germany	Berlin	17–18 January	Attended the EPP Leaders’ Retreat. He also met with leader of the opposition and leader of the Christian Democratic Union, Friedrich Merz.
Belgium	Brussels	3 February	Christodoulides attended an informal European Council summit.
France	Paris	27 March	Christodoulides attended a meeting of the "Coalition of the willing" hosted by President Macron.
Albania	Tirana	16 May	Christodoulides attended the 6th European Political Community Summit.
United Kingdom	London	21 May	Met with Prime Minister Keir Starmer.
Finland	Helsinki	22 May	Met with President Alexander Stubb. They discussed bilateral relations between Finland and Cyprus, as well as European security, Russia’s illegal war of aggression in Ukraine, and the regional situations in the Eastern Mediterranean and the Middle East.
Latvia	Riga	19 June	He made the first official visit to Latvia, meeting President Edgars Rinkēvičs. The leaders discussed their countries common history of foreign occupation and strong support for a rules-based international order.
Belgium	Brussels	26–27 June	Christodoulides attended the European Council meeting.
United States	New York City	22-26 September	Christodoulides is attended the 80th United Nations General Assembly.
Denmark	Copenhagen	2 October	Attended the 7th European Political Community Summit.
Egypt	Sharm El Sheikh	13 October	Christodoulides attended the Sharm El Sheikh summit which included the signing of the Gaza peace plan to end the Gaza war.
Slovenia	Portoroz	20 October	Christodoulides attended the Med9 summit hosted by Prime Minister Robert Golob.
Germany	Berlin	14 November	Met with Chancellor Friedrich Merz. This meeting focus on discussing the priorities of Cyprus's upcoming presidency of the Council of the European Union.
Ukraine	Kyiv	4 December	Held a meeting with President Volodymyr Zelenskyy. This is the first visit of the Cypriot Head of State to Ukraine since the beginning of Russia’s full-scale invasion, and the last time a President of Cyprus visited Ukraine was ten years ago.

== 2026 ==
Country	Location(s)	Dates	Details
Croatia	Zagreb	30–31 January	Attended the EPP Leaders’ Retreat.
Belgium	Antwerp, Rijkhoven	11–12 February	Christodoulides attended the 3rd European Industry Summit. Next day participated in the informal meeting of EU heads of state and government.
Belgium	Brussels	19–20 March	Christodoulides attended the European Council.
Armenia	Yerevan	3–4 May	Christodoulides attended the 8th European Political Community Summit.
India	Mumbai, New Delhi	20–23 May	At the invitation of Indian Prime minister Narendra Modi, Christodoulides underwent a state visit.
Kazakhstan	Astana	2–4 June	At the invitation of Kazakh President Kassym-Jomart Tokayev, Christodoulides underwent a state visit while also inaugurating the Cypriot embassy in Astana.
Montenegro	Tivat	5 June	Attended the EU–Western Balkans Summit.
Belgium	Brussels	18–19 June	Attended the European Council.
United States	New York City	22–26 September	Christodoulides is attended the 81th United Nations General Assembly.
Croatia	Split	7 October	Christodoulides attended the 13th EU Med Summit.
Belgium	Brussels	15–16 October	Christodoulides attended the European Council.
Ireland	Dublin	12 November	Christodoulides attended the 9th European Political Community Summit.

== Future trips ==
Country	Location	Date	Details
Cambodia	Phnom Penh	15–16 November	Christodoulides is scheduled to attend the 20th Organisation internationale de la Francophonie summit.

== Multilateral meetings ==
Multilateral meetings of the following intergovernmental organizations took place during Nikos Christodoulides' presidency (2023–Present).

Group	Year					
Group	2023	2024	2025	2026	2027	2028
UNGA	25 September, (United States) New York City	28 September, (United States) New York City	25 September, (United States) New York City	TBD, (United States) New York City	TBD, (United States) New York City	TBD, (United States) New York City
OIF	none	4–5 October, (France) Villers-Cotterêts	none	15–16 November, (Cambodia) Phnom Penh	TBA	TBA
CHOGM	5–6 May, (United Kingdom) London	25–26 October,^{[a]} (Samoa) Apia	none	1–4 November, (Antigua and Barbuda) St John's	none	TBD
MED9	29 September, (Malta) Mdina	11 October, (Cyprus) Paphos	20 October, (Slovenia) Portorož	7 October, (Croatia) Split		
EPC	1 June, (Moldova) Bulboaca	18 July, (United Kingdom) Woodstock	16 May, (Albania) Tirana	4 May, (Armenia) Yerevan	TBD, (Switzerland) TBD	TBD, (Azerbaijan) TBD
EPC	5 October, (Spain) Granada	7 November, (Hungary) Budapest	2 October, (Denmark) Copenhagen	12 November, (Republic of Ireland) TBD	TBD, (Greece) TBD	TBD, (Latvia) TBD
EU–CELAC	17–18 July, (Belgium) Brussels	None	9–10 November, (Colombia) Santa Marta	None		
Others	None	Global Peace Summit; 15–16 June, (Switzerland) Lucerne	Building a robust peace for Ukraine and Europe; 27 March, (France) Paris	Together for peace and security summit 6 January, (France) Paris		
██ = Did not attend.^aInterior Minister Konstantinos Ioannou attended in the President's place. ██ = Future event.
