= List of international prime ministerial trips made by Krišjānis Kariņš =

This is a list of international prime ministerial trips made by Krišjānis Kariņš, who served as the 23rd prime minister of Latvia from 23 January 2019 to 15 September 2023.

== Summary ==
Kariņš has visited 27 countries during his tenure as prime minister. The number of visits per country to which Kariņš has travelled is:

- One visit to Belarus, Canada, Croatia, Czech Republic, Denmark, Finland, Moldova, Romania, Slovenia, Spain, Ukraine, the United States
- Two visits to Estonia, Poland and the United Kingdom
- Three visits to France, Lithuania and the Netherlands
- Five visits to Germany
- Eighteen visits to Belgium

== 2019 ==
Country	Location(s)	Dates	Details
Estonia	Tallinn	8 February	Met with Prime Minister Jüri Ratas. He said it was "symbolically important" that he had chosen Estonia for his first foreign trip. They discussed possibilities to strengthen bilateral relations, regional transport and energy projects involving both countries, regional security issues as well as topical issues on the European Union's agenda, including Brexit and the multi-annual budget process.
Belgium	Brussels	22 February	Kariņš assured that Latvia would maintain a "Euro-Atlantic course," and that Brexit negotiator Michel Barnier had his full support.
Germany	Berlin	11 March	Inaugural visit to the Federal Chancellery; met Chancellor Angela Merkel to discuss Europe, NATO and Ukraine.
Belgium	Brussels	21 March	Attended European People's Party summit.
France	Strasbourg	17 April	He addressed the European Parliament, arguing that it was "useless" to just fight against the rise of populism, and that it was necessary to understand the grievances of people who listened to the promises of populists.
Romania	Sibiu	9 May	Meeting with other EU leaders. He expressed support for the Spitzenkandidat process of electing a new European Commissioner used in 2014 that had come under fire by other leaders such as President of France Emmanuel Macron and President of Lithuania Dalia Grybauskaitė.
Belgium	Brussels	28 May	Attended EPP summit.
Netherlands	The Hague	17 June	He met Prime Minister Mark Rutte, arriving at the Catshuis by bicycle, symbolizing strong bilateral ties and European cooperation.
Belgium	Brussels	20 June	Attended EPP summit.
Belgium	Brussels	30 June	Attended EPP summit.
United States	New York City, Washington, D. C.	8–15 July	This was a working visit. Kariņš met with representatives of the US presidential administration and Congress to have discussions with entrepreneurs, representatives of think-tanks and gave interviews to the mass media. The prime minister also met representatives of the Latvian diaspora in New York and Washington. Kariņš met U.S. Vice President Mike Pence, House Speaker Nancy Pelosi, Financial Secretary Steven Mnuchin and Energy Secretary Rick Perry, among others.
Belgium	Brussels	2 October	Kariņš met President of the European Parliament David-Maria Sassoli and President of the European Council Donald Tusk. The officials discussed the issues facing the European Union, as well as regional security. He also met NATO secretary general Jens Stoltenberg in NATO headquarters. They discussed the ongoing adaptation of NATO, the need to change NATO amid a changing world.
Belgium	Brussels	17 October	Attended EPP summit.
Croatia	Zagreb	20 November	Attended EPP summit.
Belgium	Brussels	12 December	Attended EPP summit.

== 2020 ==
Country	Location(s)	Dates	Details
Belarus	Minsk	16 January	He made the short trip across the eastern border to Belarus to meet with his Belarusian counterpart Sergei Roumas and long-time President Alexander Lukashenko.
Denmark	Copenhagen	31 January	Met with Prime Minister Mette Frederiksen. They discussed topical issues with the representatives of the Latvian diaspora, as well as visited two Danish companies: "State of Green", which gathers national expertise and achievements in green technology, and "Energy Lab Nordhavn", which offers future solutions in smart energy.
Finland	Helsinki	12 February	Met with Prime Minister Sanna Marin.
Belgium	Brussels	1–2 October	Kariņs attended an extraordinary European Council.

== 2021 ==
Country	Location(s)	Dates	Details
Slovenia	Ljubljana	5–6 October	Kariņš attended an informal European Council and the EU-Western Balkans summit.
Belgium	Brussels	21–22 October	Kariņš attended the European Council and the EPP summit.
Germany	Berlin	10 November	Along with Portuguese António Costa, he met Chancellor Angela Merkel in Schloss Meseberg.
France	Paris	1 December	Met with French President Emmanuel Macron and Mathias Cormann, Secretary General of the Organisation for Economic Co-operation and Development (OECD).
Lithuania	Vilnius	7–8 December	Met with Prime Minister of Lithuania Ingrida Šimonytė and Prime Minister of Estonia Kaja Kallas at the Baltic Council of Ministers.

== 2022 ==
Country	Location(s)	Dates	Details
Poland	Warsaw	19 January	Met with Prime Minister Mateusz Morawiecki to discuss bilateral relations, regional security, and cooperation within the European Union and NATO. The leaders also exchanged views on the situation in Ukraine, the activities of the Alexander Lukashenko regime in Belarus, and energy policy in Europe, emphasizing that Poland and Latvia share similar positions on many key political and security issues and highlighted the importance of cooperation in infrastructure and regional initiatives such as the Three Seas Initiative.
Germany	Berlin	10 February	Together with Prime Minister of Estonia Kaja Kallas and President of Lithuania Gitanas Nausėda met with Federal Chancellor Olaf Scholz in Berlin. The tense security situation in Europe and Ukraine were discussed.
Belgium	Brussels	24 February	Krišjānis Kariņš participated in an extraordinary European Council meeting in Brussels, where Russia's large-scale military attack on Ukraine was discussed.
France	Versailles	10–11 March	Participation in the informal meeting of EU Heads of State and Government.
United Kingdom	London	14–15 March	Kariņš attended Joint Expeditionary Force meeting.
Belgium	Brussels	24 March	Attended the European Council. Met with U.S. President Joe Biden, Lithuanian President Gitanas Nausėda and others. They discussed the Russian aggression in Ukraine and security, as well as other bilateral and security issues, solidifying transatlantic ties and NATO commitments.
Canada	Ottawa	11–12 May	On 11 May, he met the Honourable Anthony Rota, Speaker of the House of Commons, and with the Deputy Prime Minister and Minister of Finance, Chrystia Freeland. The Prime Minister Kariņš highlighted Canada's contribution to strengthening Baltic regional security. Officials discussed the international security situation regarding the Russian invasion of Ukraine, further support to Ukraine, discussed ways to strengthen NATO's deterrence and defence measures ahead of the upcoming NATO summit in June, Madrid. The next day, he met Prime Minister Justin Trudeau. They discussed ways to coordinate additional military support to Ukraine amid the country's fight against Russian aggression, stressed the importance of coordination among members of the NATO and discussed ways to strengthen NATO's deterrence and defence measures in Eastern Europe, particularly in the Baltic region. They also discussed Canada-Latvia partnership and commitment to the rules-based international system, as well as security issues in the broader Baltic region. Following their meeting, Prime Minister Trudeau announced Canada will deploy a Canadian Armed Forces general officer and six staff officers to NATO's Multinational Division North Headquarters, based in Ādaži, Latvia.
Netherlands	Rotterdam	31 May–1 June	Participated in the European People's Party Congress. Met with President of Moldova Maia Sandu
Lithuania	Vilnius	7 June	Meeting with President Gitanas Nausėda, Prime Minister Ingrida Šimonytė, Estonian prime minister Kaja Kallas and German chancellor Olaf Scholz.
Spain	Madrid	13 June	Met with Prime Minister Pedro Sánchez.
Netherlands	The Hague	14 June	Met with Prime Minister of Portugal Antonio Costa, NATO secretary general Jens Stoltenberg, Prime Minister Mark Rutte, Prime Minister of Denmark Mette Frederiksen, Prime Minister of Belgium Alexander De Croo and Prime Minister of Poland Mateusz Morawiecki on the Catshuis after a meeting in preparation for the NATO summit in Madrid. The discussions included the Russian invasion of Ukraine
Denmark	Copenhagen	30 August	He participated in the Baltic Sea Energy Security Summit in Copenhagen and Marienborg at the invitation of Danish prime minister Mette Frederiksen, where she met with President of the European Commission Ursula von der Leyen, Finnish President Sauli Niinistö, Estonian Prime minister Kaja Kallas, Lithuanian President Gitanas Nausėda and Polish President Andrzej Duda. He said that "countries surrounding the Baltic Sea should minimise economic cooperation with Russia, especially in the energy sector".
Germany	Berlin	4 September	Krišjānis Kariņš participated in a festive ceremony with Estonian Prime Minister Kaja Kallas and Lithuanian Prime Minister Ingrida Šimonytė in Berlin, where they were awarded the Friedrich August von Hayek Foundation International Prize for the Protection of Democratic Values and the Implementation of Liberal Economic Policy.
Czech Republic	Prague	6–7 October	Attended at the Prague Castle the 1st European Political Community Summit and an informal European Council.
Belgium	Brussels	20–21 October	Participation in the European Council.

== 2023 ==
Country	Location(s)	Dates	Details
Belgium	Brussels	9–10 February	Attended an informal extraordinary European Council meeting. On the agenda were support for Ukraine, economic competitiveness, and migration.
Germany	Berlin	1–2 March	Met with Chancellor Olaf Scholz. They discussed providing support to Ukraine in the fight against Russian military aggression, the security situation in Europe and the upcoming NATO summit in Vilnius in June, as well as Latvian and German bilateral relations and economic cooperation.
Poland	Warsaw	15 March	Met with Prime Minister Mateusz Morawiecki. They discussed cooperation within NATO and support for Ukraine in its defence against Russian invaders. They also discussed the expansion of energy infrastructure in the region and the energy security of their countries.
Ukraine	Kyiv	16 March	Met with President Volodymyr Zelenskyy.
Belgium	Brussels	23 March	Attended the European Council. The topic was the focus of European Union countries on assisting Ukraine and increasing economic competitiveness. He also answered media questions.
Belgium	Brussels	24 May	Met with NATO secretary general Jens Stoltenberg in NATO headquarters, thanked him for Latvia's contributions to the Alliance, including leadership on defense spending, and deployments to maritime operations and missions in Kosovo and Iraq.
Estonia	Tallinn	26 May	Met with the prime minister of Estonia Kaja Kallas, Chancellor of Germany Olaf Scholz, Prime Minister of Lithuania Ingrida Šimonytė and President of Lithuania Gitanas Nausėda. During the visit, issues of NATO security, defense cooperation and support for Ukraine were discussed.
Moldova	Mimi Castle, Bulboaca, Chișinău	1 June	Kariņš travelled to Moldova to attend the 2nd European Political Community Summit.
United Kingdom	London	21–22 June	Attended Ukraine Recovery Conference.
Belgium	Brussels	29 June	Attended European People's Party summit. Met with President of the European Commission Ursula von der Leyen.
Lithuania	Vilnius	10–12 July	Kariņš attended the 33rd NATO summit. The strength of NATO's deterrence and collective defense, both now and in the future, and the issues of Ukraine were discussed.
Belgium	Brussels	17–18 July	Attended the 3rd EU–CELAC summit.

== Multilateral meetings ==
Krišjānis Kariņš participated in the following summits during his premiership:

Group	Year				
Group	2019	2020	2021	2022	2023
NATO	Not invited				11–12 July, (Lithuania) Vilnius
Ukraine Recovery Conference	1–3 July, (Canada) Toronto	None	7 July, (Lithuania) Vilnius	4–5 July, (Switzerland) Lugano	21–22 June, (United Kingdom) London
EU–CELAC	None				17–18 July, (Belgium) Brussels
JEF	None			14–15 March, (United Kingdom) London	
JEF	None			19 December, (Latvia) Riga	
EPC	Didn't exist			6 October, (Czech Republic) Prague	1 June, (Moldova) Bulboaca
██ = Did not attend.
