= List of international prime ministerial trips made by Nikol Pashinyan =

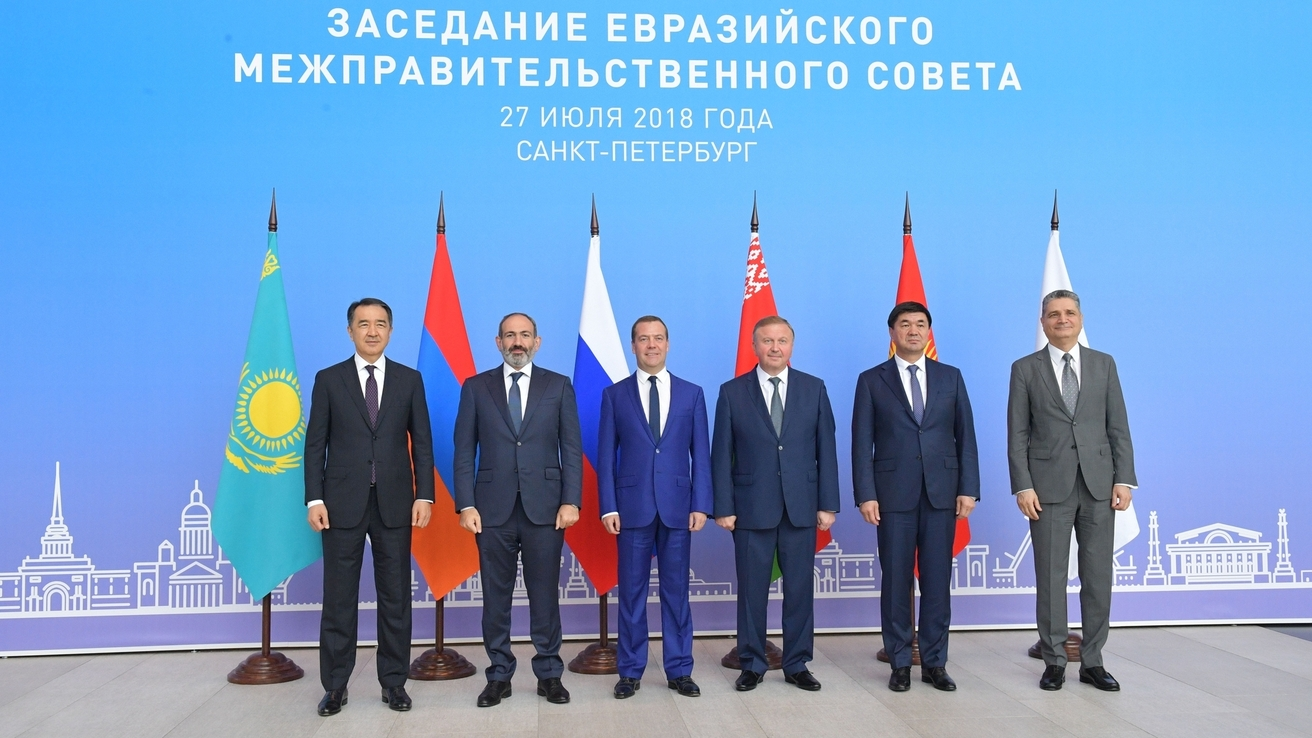

The following is a list of international prime ministerial trips made by Nikol Pashinyan since he became the Prime Minister of Armenia on May 8, 2018.

== Summary ==
=== 2018 ===
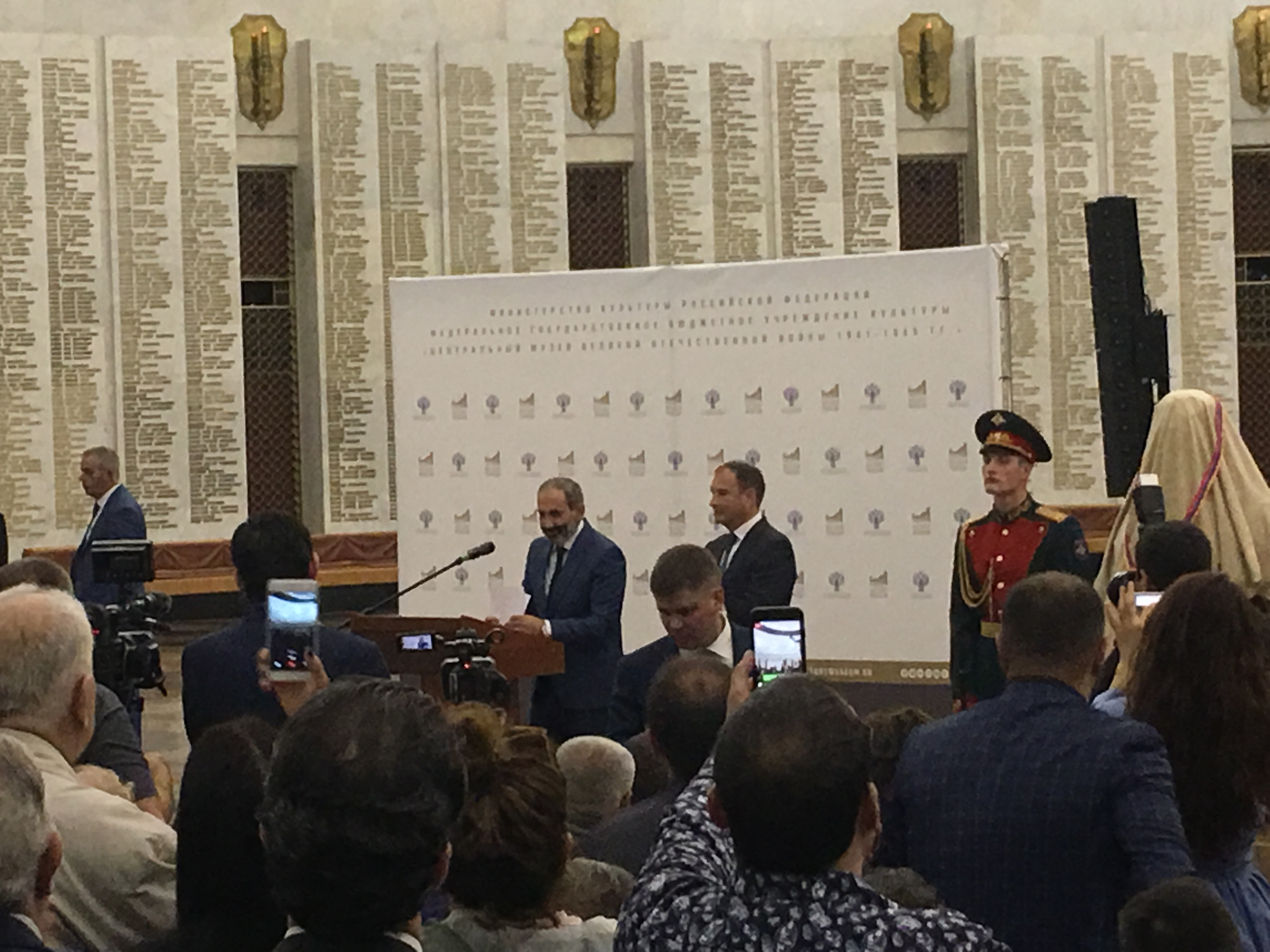
Pashinyan at the Central Museum of the Great Patriotic War in Moscow in 2018

Country	Areas visited	Date(s)	Notes	Photo
Russia	Sochi	May 14	Main article: Armenia–Russia relations Attended the regular session of the Eurasian Intergovernmental Council. Met with Vladimir Putin, Sooronbay Jeenbekov, Igor Dodon, Alexander Lukashenko, Tigran Sargsyan.	
Georgia	Tbilisi; Samtskhe–Javakheti	May 30–31	Official visit. Met with President Giorgi Margvelashvili and Giorgi Kvirikashvili. Inaugurated a memorial plaque commemorating the 100th anniversary of the founding of the First Armenian Republic.	
Russia	Moscow	June 14	Attended the opening ceremony of the 2018 FIFA World Cup Met with Vladimir Putin and Ilham Aliyev.	
Belgium	Brussels	July 11–13	Attended the NATO summit. Held a bilateral meeting with Emmanuel Macron and met with Donald Trump.	
Russia	Saint Petersburg	July 27	Attended the regular session of the Eurasian Intergovernmental Council.	
Russia	Moscow	September 8	Main article: Armenia–Russia relations	
France	Paris	September 14	Working visit.	
United States	New York City	September 25–26	Attended the UN Seventy-third session of the United Nations General Assembly.	
Tajikistan	Dushanbe	September 27–28	Attended the heads of state summit of the Commonwealth of Independent States (CIS).	
France	Paris	October 4	Attended the funeral of Charles Aznavour.	
Lebanon	Beirut	October 20–21	Working visit.	
Kazakhstan	Astana	November 8–9	Working visit: CSTO council meeting.	
France	Paris	November 10–11	Attended the ceremony marking the 100th anniversary of the end of the World War I and the Paris Peace Forum.	
Russia	Saint Petersburg	December 6	Working visit: meeting of the Supreme Eurasian Economic Council.	
Russia	Moscow	December 27	Main article: Armenia–Russia relations	

=== 2019 ===
Country	Areas visited	Date(s)	Notes	Photo
Georgia	Bolnisi	January 15	Held an informal meeting with Georgian Prime Minister Mamuka Bakhtadze	
Switzerland	Davos; Zürich	January 21–25	Annual World Economic Forum. Met with Ilham Aliyev.	
Russia	Moscow	January 23–25	Met with Dmitry Medvedev and Tigran Sargsyan.	
Germany	Cologne; Berlin	January 31 – February 1	State Visit	
Iran	Tehran	February 27–28	State Visit.	
Belgium	Brussels	March 4–7	Working Visit.	
Austria	Vienna	March 29	Working Visit. Met with Austrian Chancellor Sebastian Kurz and Azerbaijani President Ilham Aliyev.	
France	Strasbourg	April 11	Working visit.	
Luxembourg	Luxembourg City	May 12	Working visit.	
Belgium	Brussels	May 12–13	Working Visit.	
China	Beijing	May 14–16	Working visit.	
Kazakhstan	Nur-Sultan	May 28	Working visit: Eurasian Economic Union.	
Russia	Saint Petersburg	June 6–7	Working visit: meeting of the St. Petersburg International Economic Forum.	
Vietnam	Hanoi	July 4–6	State Visit.	
Singapore	Central Area	July 7–9	State Visit.	
Kyrgyzstan	Bishkek	August 8–9	Working visit	
United States	Los Angeles; New York City	September 21–22	Attended the UN Seventy-fourth session of the United Nations General Assembly.	
Turkmenistan	Ashgabat	October 11	Attended the CIS summit	
Russia	Moscow	October 25	Working visit	
France	Paris	November 11–12	Working visit	
Italy	Venice; Rome	November 20–22	Official visit	
Kyrgyzstan	Bishkek	November 27	Working visit	
Russia	Saint Petersburg	December 20	Working visit	

=== 2020 ===
Country	Areas visited	Date(s)	Notes	Photo
Kazakhstan	Almaty	31 January – 1 February	Met with Russian Prime Minister Mikhail Mishustin in January 2020	
Germany	Munich	15 February	Attended the Munich Security Conference	
Georgia	Tbilisi	3–4 March		
Belgium	Brussels	9 March		
Belarus	Minsk	17 July	Working visit, participation in the session of the Eurasian Intergovernmental Council.	

=== 2021 ===
Country	Areas visited	Date(s)	Notes
Russia	Moscow	11 January	Trilateral summit with Vladimir Putin and Ilham Aliyev.
Kazakhstan	Almaty	4–5 February	
Russia	Moscow	7 April	
Russia	Kazan	29 April	
France	Paris	1 June	Working visit
Belgium	Brussels	2 June	Working visit
Russia	Moscow	7 July	
Iran	Tehran	5 August	Inauguration of Ebrahim Raisi.
Kyrgyzstan	Cholpon-Ata	19–20 August 2021	Eurasian Economic Union Intergovernmental Council summit and meeting with Sadyr Japarov.
Georgia	Tbilisi; Batumi	8 September	Official visit
Tajikistan	Dushanbe	15–17 September	
Lithuania	Vilnius; Kaunas	3–4 October	
Russia	Moscow	12 October	
Russia	Sochi	26 November	Trilateral summit with Russian President Vladimir Putin and Azerbaijani President Ilham Aliyev.

=== 2022 ===
Country	Areas visited	Date(s)	Notes	Photo
Kazakhstan	Nur-Sultan	February 24–25	Working visit	
France	Paris	March 8–9	Working visit	
Belgium	Brussels	April 5–6	Working visit	
Russia	Moscow; Nizhny Novgorod	April 19–20	State visit	
Netherlands	The Hague	May 10–11	State visit Met with Dutch Prime Minister Mark Rutte.	
Russia	Moscow	May 16	Working visit	
Qatar	Doha	June 13	State visit	
Belarus	Minsk	June 20–21	Working visit	
Kyrgyzstan	Cholpon-Ata	August 25–26	Working visit	
Belgium	Brussels	August 31	Working visit	
Russia	Vladivostok	September 6–9		
United States	New York City	September 22–23	Working visit. Met with US Secretary of State Antony Blinken.	
France	Paris	September 26	Working visit	
Czech Republic	Prague	October 6–7	European Political Community. Met with Recep Tayyip Erdogan, Ilham Aliyev, and Emmanuel Macron.	
Russia	Sochi	October 31		
Iran	Tehran	November 1		
Tunisia	Djerba	November 19		
Kyrgyzstan	Bishkek	December 9	Working visit	
Russia	Saint Petersburg	December 26–27	Working visit	

=== 2023 ===
Country	Areas visited	Date(s)	Notes
Kazakhstan	Almaty	February 2–3	Working visit.
Germany	Munich	February 16–19	Attended the Munich Security Conference.
Germany	Berlin	March 3–4	Working visit.
Czech Republic	Prague	May 4–5	Official visit.
Russia	Moscow	May 8–9	Working visit. Attended the 2023 Moscow Victory Day Parade and met with Armenian war veterans in Moscow.
Belgium	Brussels	May 14	Working visit.
Iceland	Reykjavík	May 16–17	Working visit.
Russia	Moscow	24–25 May	Working visit
Moldova	Bulboaca; Hîncești	1 June	Attended the 2nd European Political Community Summit
Turkey	Ankara	3 June	Inauguration of President Recep Tayyip Erdoğan
Russia	Sochi	7–9 June	Working visit
Georgia	Batumi	7–8 July	Working visit
Belgium	Brussels	14–15 July	Working visit
Spain	Granada	5 October	Attended the 3rd European Political Community Summit
France	Strasbourg	16–17 October	Working visit
Georgia	Tbilisi	26 October	Working visit
France	Paris	9–10 November	Working visit. Met with President Macron. Attended the Paris Peace Forum.
Russia	Saint Petersburg	25–26 December	Working visit.

=== 2024 ===
Country	Areas visited	Date(s)	Notes
Georgia	Tbilisi	26 January	Working visit
Kazakhstan	Almaty	2 February	Working visit.
Germany	Munich	16–18 February	Attended the Munich Security Conference
France	Paris	21–22 February	Working visit
Greece	Athens	27 February	Working visit.
Egypt	Cairo	5–6 March	Official visit.
Belgium	Brussels	21 March	Working visit.
Belgium	Brussels	5 April	Working visit. Meet with President of the European Commission Ursula von der Leyen and U.S. Secretary of State Antony Blinken.
Russia	Moscow	8-9 May	Attended the EAEU summit.
Denmark	Copenhagen	14 May	Working visit.
Iran	Tehran	22 May	Working visit.
United Kingdom	Woodstock	17 July	Attended the 4th European Political Community Summit
Georgia	Tbilisi	16 September	Working visit.
France	Paris	3–5 October	Working visit.
Russia	Moscow	7 October	Attended the CIS summit.
Russia	Kazan	24 October	Attended the BRICS summit.
Hungary	Budapest	7 November	Attended the 5th European Political Community Summit
Holy See	Vatican City	18 November	Working visit.
France	Paris	7 December	Working visit. Attended the reopening ceremony of Cathédrale Notre-Dame de Paris. Met with Emmanuel Macron, Donald Trump, and Elon Musk.
Russia	Moscow	13 December	Working visit. Participated in the Eurasian Intergovernmental Council session.

=== 2025 ===
Country	Areas visited	Date(s)	Notes	Photos
Switzerland	Davos	23–24 January	Working visit.	
United States	Washington, D.C.	3–7 February	Working visit.	
France	Paris	10–11 February	Working visit.	
Germany	Munich	13–16 February	Working visit.	
Georgia	Tbilisi	23 March	Working visit	
Estonia	Tallinn	27–28 April	Official visit.	
Russia	Moscow	8–9 May	Working visit. Attended the 2025 Moscow Victory Day Parade.	
Albania	Tirana	15–17 May	Working visit. Attended the 6th European Political Community Summit.	
Turkey	Istanbul	20 June	Working visit.	
United Arab Emirates	Abu-Dhabi	9–10 July	Working visit.	
Belgium	Brussels	14 July	Working visit.	
France	Paris	14 July	Working visit.	
Russia	Altai Republic	24–25 July	Working visit.	
United States	Washington DC	7–8 August	Working visit. Signed Armenia–Azerbaijan peace agreement with Ilham Aliyev and Donald Trump.	
China	Beijing	31 August-3 September	Working visit. Attended the SCO summit and 2025 China Victory Day Parade.	
Japan	Tokyo	4-5 September	Working visit.	
Russia	Moscow	25 September	Working visit.	
United States	New York	26-27 September	Working visit.	
France	Strasbourg	28-30 September	Working visit.	
Denmark	Copenhagen	2 October	Working visit. Attended the 7th European Political Community Summit.	
Belgium	Brussels	8-9 October	Working visit.	
Tajikistan	Dushanbe	10 October	Working visit. Attended the CIS summit.	
Egypt	Sharm El-Sheikh	13 October	Working visit. Attended the Gaza Peace Summit.	
Vatican City	Vatican City	18-20 October	Working visit.	
Georgia	Tbilisi	21-22 October	Working visit.	
France	Paris	28-30 October	Working visit.	
Kazakhstan	Astana	21 November	Official visit.	
Germany	Berlin	9-10 December	Official visit.	
Russia	Saint Petersburg	21-22 December	Working visit. Attended the EAEU summit.	

=== 2026 ===
Country	Areas visited	Date(s)	Notes
Switzerland	Davos	21–22 January	Working visit.
United Arab Emirates	Abu-Dhabi	3-6 February	Working visit.
France	Paris, Strasbourg	9–11 February	Working visit.
Poland	Warsaw	25-26 February	Official visit.
Georgia	Tbilisi	23 March	Working visit
Russia	Moscow	1 April	Working visit.
Iran	Tehran	3 July	Attended the State funeral of Ali Khamenei.
Russia	Yekaterinburg	6 July	Working visit.
Kyrgyzstan	Cholpon-Ata	6-8 August	Working visit.
Kyrgyzstan	Bishkek	31 August – 1 September	Attended the SCO summit and the opening ceremony of the 6th World Nomad Games.
France	Paris	9-10 September	Attended the International Space Summit.
United States	New York City	22-25 September	Attended to the 81th United Nations General Assembly.
Turkmenistan	Avaza National Tourist Zone	8-9 October	Attended the CIS summit.
France	Paris	9-10 November	Attended the Paris Peace Forum.
Turkey	Antalya	11–12 November	Attended the 2026 United Nations Climate Change Conference.
Ireland	Dublin	12–13 November	Attended the 9th European Political Community Summit.
Cambodia	Phnom Penh	14–16 November	Attended the 20th Organisation internationale de la Francophonie summit.

== Visits to the Republic of Artsakh ==
Areas visited	Date(s)	Notes
Stepanakert	9 May 2018	Working visit. Attended the Victory and Peace Day and Shushi Liberation Day celebrations, meeting with Bako Sahakyan.
Stepanakert	16 June 2018	Working visit. Visited the Artsakh Defense Ministry.
Stepanakert	25 August 2018	Working visit.
Stepanakert	1 November 2018	Working visit.
Stepanakert, eastern border	4–5 November 2018	Official visit.
Stepanakert	11–12 March 2019	Working visit.
Stepanakert	9 May 2019	Working visit. Attended the Victory Day and Liberation Day celebrations.
Stepanakert	5 August 2019	Working visit.
Stepanakert	1 December 2019	Working visit.
Stepanakert	9 May 2020	Working visit. Attended the Victory Day and Liberation Day celebrations.
Shusha	21 May 2020	Attended the inauguration of Arayik Harutyunyan.
Stepanakert	30 August 2020	Working visit.
Stepanakert	6 October 2020	Working visit. Attended consultations with the leadership of the Ministry of Defence during the Second Nagorno-Karabakh War.

== Future visits ==
Country	Areas visited	Date(s)	Notes
Russia	Saint Petersburg	21 December	Pashinyan is plan to attend the EAEU and informal CIS summit.
Italy	Rome	TBD	State visit
Bulgaria	Sofia	TBD	State visit
Romania	Bucharest	TBD	State visit
Finland	Helsinki	TBD	State visit
Sweden	Stockholm	TBD	State visit

== Multilateral meetings ==
Nikol Pashinyan participated in the following summits during his premiership:

Group	Year								
Group	2018	2019	2020	2021	2022	2023	2024	2025	2026
UNGA	25–26 September, (United States) New York City	21–22 September, (United States) New York City	26 September, (videoconference) (United States) New York City	20–23 September, (United States) New York City	22–23 September (United States) New York City	23 September,^{[a]} (United States) New York City	26 September, (United States) New York City	26–27 September, (United States) New York City	22–25 September, (United States) New York City
OIF	11–12 October, (Armenia) Yerevan	none	none	none	19–20 November, (Tunisia) Djerba	none	4–5 October, (France) Villers-Cotterêts	none	15–16 November, (Cambodia) Phnom Penh
CSTO	8 November, (Kazakhstan) Astana	28 November, (Kyrgyzstan) Bishkek	2 December, (Russia) Moscow	15–17 September, (Tajikistan) Dushanbe	16 May, (Russia) Moscow; 23 November, (Armenia) Yerevan	23 November, (Belarus) Minsk	28 November, (Kazakhstan) Astana	27 November, (Kyrgyzstan) Bishkek	11 November, (Russia) Moscow
EPC	Did not exist				6 October (Czech Republic) Prague	1 June (Moldova) Bulboaca	18 July (United Kingdom) Woodstock	16 May (Albania) Tirana	4 May (Armenia) Yerevan
EPC	Did not exist				6 October (Czech Republic) Prague	5 October (Spain) Granada	7 November (Hungary) Budapest	2 October (Denmark) Copenhagen	12 November (Republic of Ireland) Dublin
██ = Did not attend; ██ = Future event.^aForeign Minister Ararat Mirzoyan attended in the Prime Minister's place.
