= Norway House (Minneapolis, Minnesota) =

Cultural center in Minneapolis

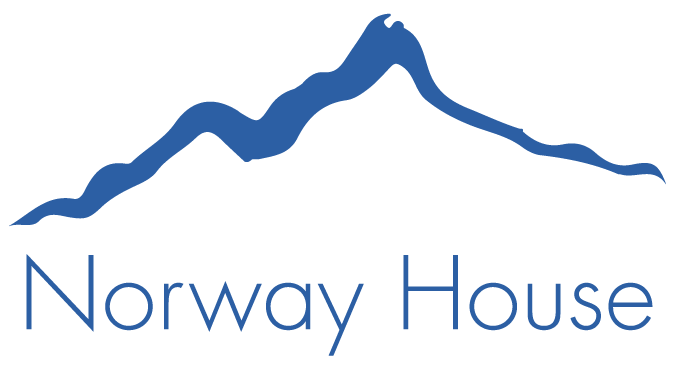

- Costume by designer Lise Skjåk Bræk
- Established: 2004
- Location: 913 E Franklin Ave, Minneapolis, Minnesota 55404, United States
- Coordinates: 44.9623376°N 93.2606282°W
- Type: Cultural Center
- President: Christina Carleton
- Website: norwayhouse.org

Norway House is a cultural and business center located in Minneapolis, Minnesota, specifically in the Ventura Village neighborhood. It serves as a hub for Norwegian heritage and Nordic culture in the Twin Cities. Established in 2015, Norway House recently completed a $19.6 million expansion to its main building. The addition includes multiple facilities such as offices, a café, an art gallery, and spaces for events and conferences. Norway House hosts the Norwegian Honorary Consulate General and business programs supporting Norwegian companies entering the American market.

== Building ==
The building connects to the adjacent Mindekirken Church, one of the few American Lutheran churches where services are still conducted in Norwegian. Norway House also includes community spaces such as a plaza with a distinctive pinecone-shaped sculpture made from steel that reflects the local environment.

== Programs & events ==
The center focuses on arts, business, and culture rather than being a traditional museum. It offers programs including art shows, music festivals featuring Norwegian composers, genealogy research, and cultural celebrations. The center also supports local organizations such as Concordia Language Villages and hosts events like the Minnesota Peace Initiative and annual gingerbread displays.

Notable events include visits from Norwegian royalty, such as Queen Sonja, who toured the center and spoke about the strong ties between Norway and Minnesota.

== Publications ==
The organization also publishes "The Norwegian American," a newspaper serving the Norwegian-American community nationwide since 1889. Norway House operates as a bridge for cultural exchange, education, business, and community engagement in Minneapolis.
