= 5th European Political Community Summit =

European Political Community Summit

5th European Political Community Summit Az Európai Politikai Közösség ötödik csúcstalálkozója
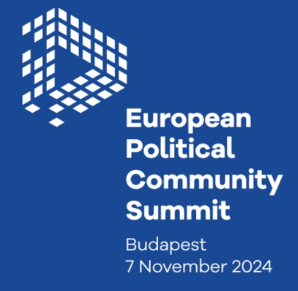

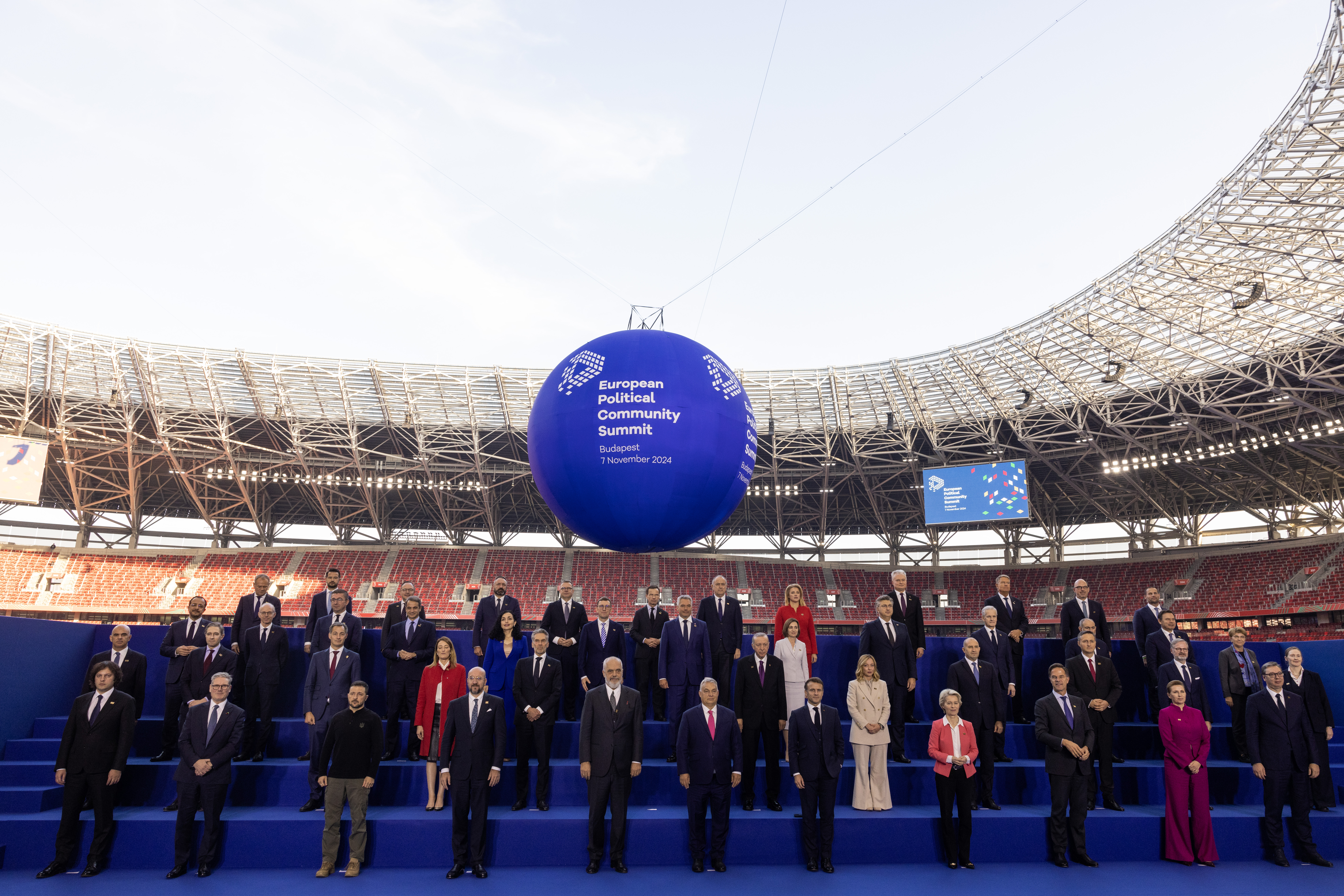
- European leaders at the 5th European Political Community Summit
- Host country: Hungary
- Date: 7 November 2024
- Cities: Budapest
- Venues: Puskás Aréna
- Participants: 42 states
- Chair: Viktor Orbán, Prime Minister of Hungary
- Follows: 4th
- Precedes: 6th
- Website: EU Council

The Fifth European Political Community Summit was a meeting of the European Political Community held on 7 November 2024 in Hungary.

== Aims ==
The invitation letter to the summit stated that:

"The leaders will discuss the main security challenges affecting Europe posed by ongoing conflicts, including Russia's war of aggression against Ukraine and the current escalation in the Middle East. During the breakout sessions, they will also hold discussions on migration and economic security, as well as connectivity related issues such as energy, transport, IT and global trade."

== Preparation ==
Hungary hosted the autumn summit of the European Political Community during its Presidency of the Council of the European Union. The date of the summit was announced by Charles Michel on 20 March 2024. An informal meeting of the European Council took place the following day.

The host for the preceding summit, the United Kingdom, had pledged to work with other EPC members to promote coherence across future EPC summits. To this end, the British ambassador in Budapest, Paul Fox, met with Hungarian Europe minister, János Bóka, on 25 March 2024. Following the fourth summit, a hosting quartet consisting of the United Kingdom, Hungary, Albania and Denmark was set up to further coordinate between summits.

== Schedule and agenda ==
The summit is scheduled to take place on 7 November 2024 at the Puskás Aréna in Budapest, Hungary.

The schedule and agenda was as follows:

- 10.00: Arrivals and doorsteps
- 11.15: Opening session
- 12.15: Family photo
- 12.30: Breakout sessions
- 13:30: Opportunity for bilateral meetings and lunch
- 15.30: Reporting session
- 17:30: Press conference by the Prime Minister of Hungary and the Prime Minister of Albania
- 18:00: End of the meeting

== Participants ==
=== Participating states and organisations ===
Countries participating in the European Political Community

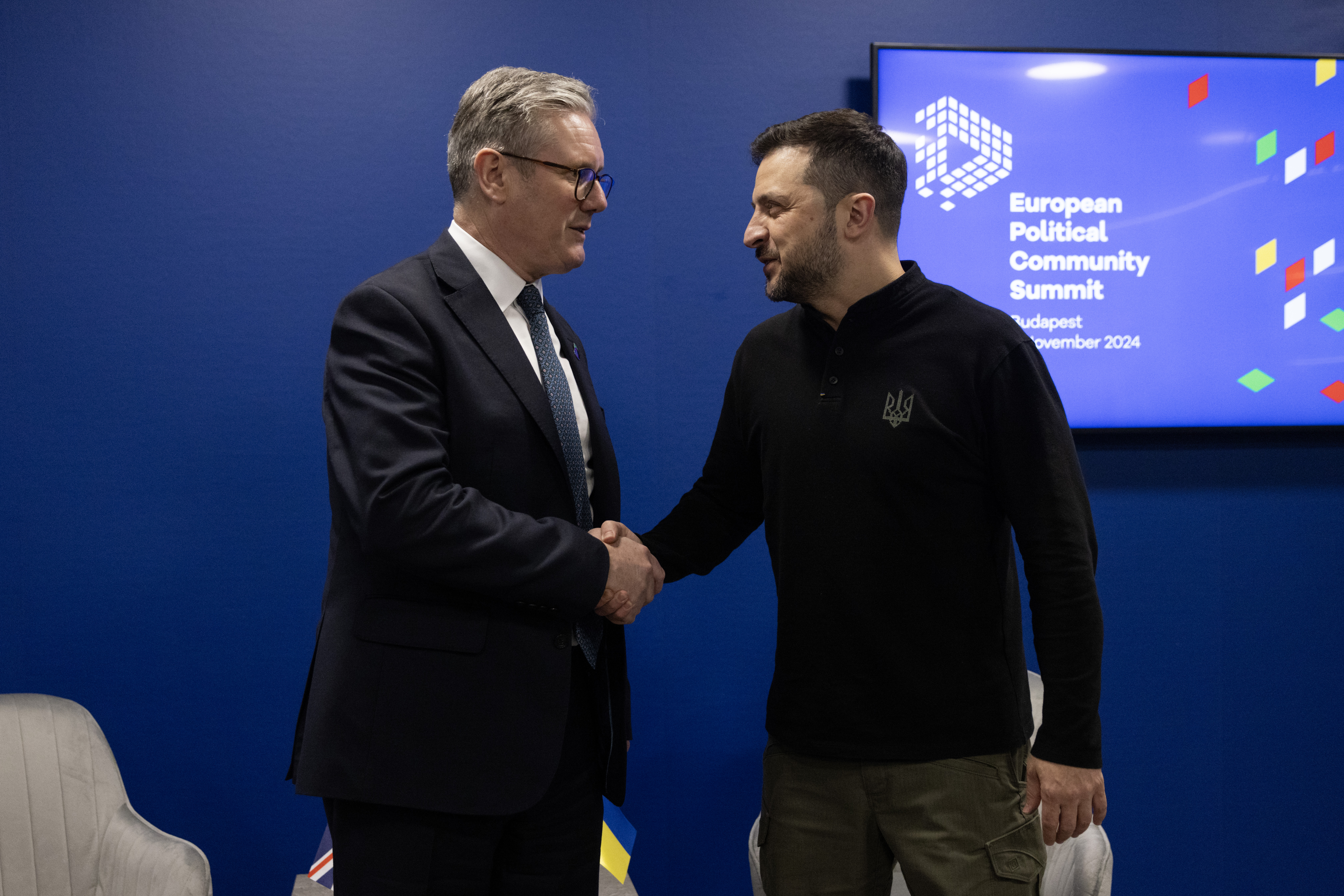
Bilateral meeting

The summit is expected to be attended by the heads of state or government of the states participating in the European Political Community along with the President of the European Council, the President of the European Commission and the President of the European Parliament.

Participating states

Key
Absent

Member		Represented by	Title
(Albania)	Albania	Edi Rama	Prime Minister
(Andorra)	Andorra	Xavier Espot Zamora	Prime Minister
(Armenia)	Armenia	Nikol Pashinyan	Prime Minister
(Austria)	Austria	Karl Nehammer	Chancellor
(Azerbaijan)	Azerbaijan		
(Belgium)	Belgium	Alexander De Croo	Prime Minister
(Bosnia and Herzegovina)	Bosnia and Herzegovina	Denis Bećirović	President
(Bulgaria)	Bulgaria	Rumen Radev	President
(Croatia)	Croatia	Andrej Plenković	Prime Minister
(Cyprus)	Cyprus	Nikos Christodoulides	President
(Czech Republic)	Czech Republic	Petr Fiala	Prime Minister
(Denmark)	Denmark	Mette Frederiksen	Prime Minister
(Estonia)	Estonia	Kristen Michal	Prime Minister
(European Union)	European Union		
(European Union)	European Union	António Costa	President of the European Council
(European Union)	European Union	Ursula von der Leyen	President of the European Commission
(European Union)	European Union	Roberta Metsola	President of the European Parliament
(Finland)	Finland	Petteri Orpo	Prime Minister
(France)	France	Emmanuel Macron	President
(Georgia (country))	Georgia	Irakli Kobakhidze	Prime Minister
(Germany)	Germany		
(Greece)	Greece	Kyriakos Mitsotakis	Prime Minister
(Hungary)	Hungary	Viktor Orbán	Prime Minister
(Iceland)	Iceland		
(Republic of Ireland)	Ireland	Simon Harris	Taoiseach
(Italy)	Italy	Giorgia Meloni	Prime Minister
(Kosovo)	Kosovo	Vjosa Osmani	President
(Latvia)	Latvia	Evika Siliņa	Prime Minister
(Liechtenstein)	Liechtenstein	Daniel Risch	Prime Minister
(Lithuania)	Lithuania	Gitanas Nausėda	President
(Luxembourg)	Luxembourg	Luc Frieden	Prime Minister
(Malta)	Malta	Robert Abela	Prime Minister
(Moldova)	Moldova	Maia Sandu	President
(Monaco)	Monaco	Didier Guillaume	Prime Minister
(Montenegro)	Montenegro	Jakov Milatović	President
(Netherlands)	Netherlands	Dick Schoof	Prime Minister
(North Macedonia)	North Macedonia	Hristijan Mickoski	Prime Minister
(Norway)	Norway	Jonas Gahr Støre	Prime Minister
(Poland)	Poland	Donald Tusk	Prime Minister
(Portugal)	Portugal	Luís Montenegro	Prime Minister
(Romania)	Romania	Klaus Iohannis	President
(San Marino)	San Marino	Luca Beccari	Secretary of State
(Serbia)	Serbia	Aleksandar Vučić	President
(Slovakia)	Slovakia	Robert Fico	Prime Minister
(Slovenia)	Slovenia		
(Spain)	Spain		
(Sweden)	Sweden	Ulf Kristersson	Prime Minister
(Switzerland)	Switzerland	Viola Amherd	President
(Turkey)	Turkey	Recep Tayyip Erdoğan	President
(Ukraine)	Ukraine	Volodymyr Zelenskyy	President
(United Kingdom)	United Kingdom	Keir Starmer	Prime Minister

=== Invited delegates ===
Entity		Represented by	Title
(NATO)	North Atlantic Treaty Organization	Mark Rutte	Secretary General
(Council of Europe)	Council of Europe	Alain Berset	Secretary General
(Organization for Security and Co-operation in Europe)	OSCE	Kate Fearon	Deputy Head of the OSCE Secretariat; Director of the OSCE Conflict Prevention Centre

== Outcomes ==
=== Armenia–Azerbaijan relations ===
On the sidelines of the summit, Armenian Minister of Foreign Affairs Ararat Mirzoyan participated in a meeting organized by Péter Szijjártó, the Minister of Foreign Affairs and Trade of Hungary. Mirzoyan discussed regional issues and presented the latest developments in the process of normalization of relations between Armenia and Azerbaijan, including the border delimitation process between the two countries and efforts towards the conclusion of a peace treaty. Armenian Prime Minister Nikol Pashinyan held several closed-door meetings with his counterparts regarding 'economic security'. Meanwhile, Azerbaijani President Ilham Aliyev did not participate in the summit.

=== Georgia ===
Georgian Prime Minister Irakli Kobakhidze stated that he had discussed "all the important topics ranging from ongoing developments in the country to its European integration with European leaders." While Georgian Foreign Minister Ilia Darchiashvili confirmed "the Government's strong commitment to European Union integration and its readiness to cooperate with all parties involved in the process."

=== Kosovo–Serbia relations ===
During a press conference, President Vjosa Osmani clarified that she had no planned meeting with the President of Serbia, Aleksandar Vučić, despite both being present at the event. She emphasized that the dialogue between Kosovo and Serbia takes place in Brussels under the mediation of the European Union and that discussions on implementing agreements continue between the chief negotiators in this context.

=== Moldova ===
A meeting of the Moldova Support Group was convened on the fringes of the summit. European leaders commended Moldovan president Maia Sandu's commitment to keeping the country on a European path and discussed ways to enhance cooperation to aid Moldova's economy and support reform efforts.

=== Ukraine ===
During the summit, Ukrainian president Volodymyr Zelenskyy stated, "The bill for this war should be sent to the Russians, not to Ukraine. So that Russia can no longer advance its false claims to everyone around – from the Baltics to the Balkans. Any country, any leader who respects international law and sits at this table should understand that predators always demand more and more." While Hungarian Prime Minister Viktor Orbán stated, "The war launched by Russia against Ukraine is now in its third year, the Middle East is aflame and threatens to escalate, North Africa is embroiled in destabilizing conflict, illegal migration remains a persistent challenge and is nearing its previous peak, and the global economy is facing a level of fragmentation not seen since the Cold War."

== See also ==
- European integration
- Pan-European identity
- Politics of Europe
