= Mimi Castle =

- Castel Mimi

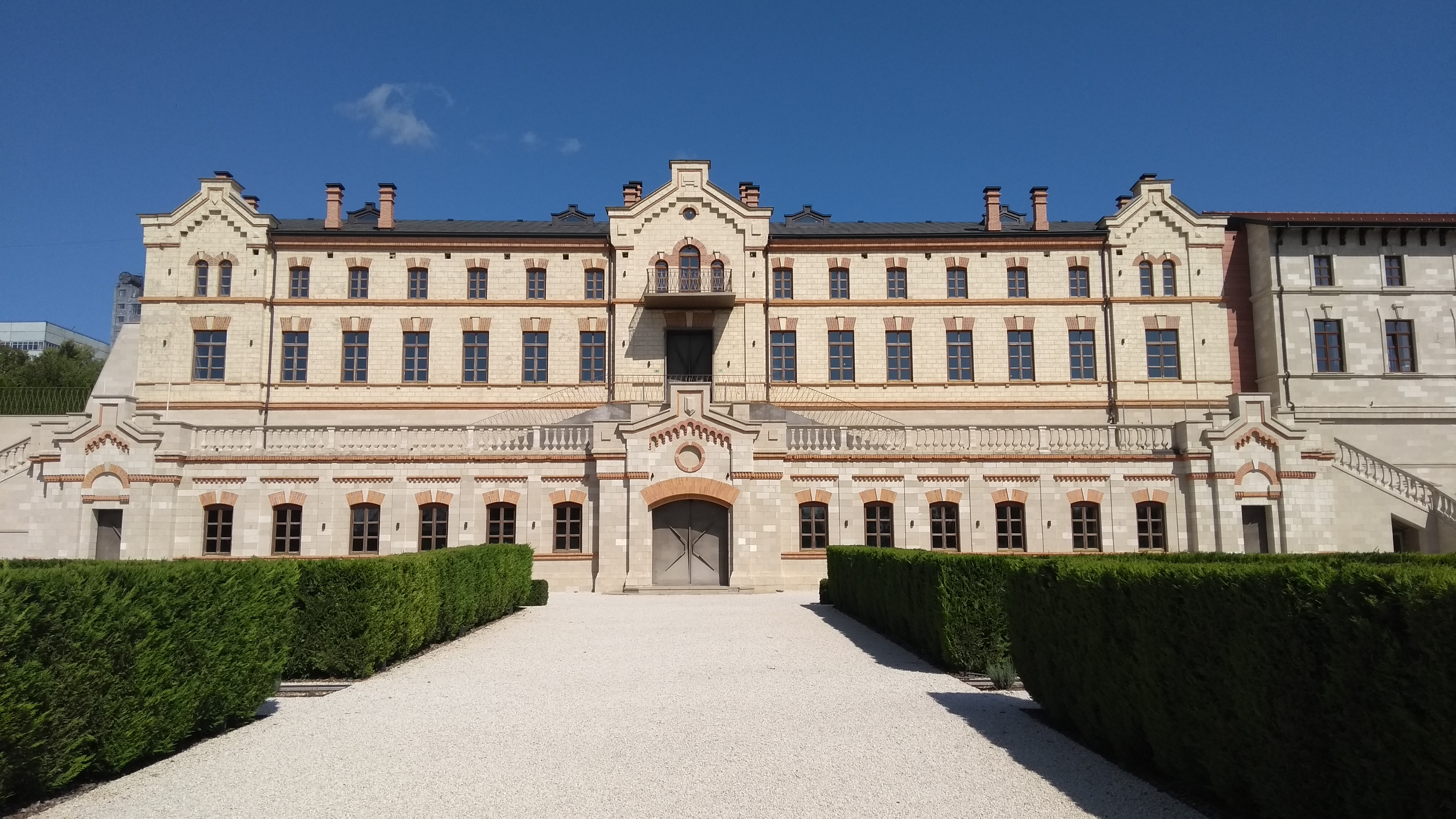
- The castle in 2021

- Location within Moldova
- Alternative names: Winery of the Mimi family

General information
- Type: Mansion
- Architectural style: Neoclassical
- Location: Bulboaca, Anenii Noi District, Moldova
- Coordinates: 46°53′30″N 29°17′31″E
- Current tenants: Trofim family
- Completed: 1901
- Renovated: 2016
- Owner: Constantin Mimi

Website
- www.castelmimi.md/en/

The Mimi Castle (Romanian: Castel Mimi), officially called the Winery of the Mimi family (Romanian: Fabrica de vin a familiei Mimi), is a winery and architectural monument, which was built at the end of the 19th century in the village of Bulboaca in the district Anenii Noi in Moldova.

== History ==
The construction of the winery, which was commissioned by the Bessarabian statesman and later diplomat and winemaker Constantin Mimi on the land of his family, was completed in 1900/1901 (according to other information as early as 1893) Its architectural design was inspired by French models and shows forms of classicism and historicism. This is because Mimi, a dedicated vine grower and winemaker and the founder of one of the most famous wineries in Bessarabia, studied viticulture and winemaking in Montpellier. This winery is believed to be the first authentic chateau in Bessarabia. Since it was built from reinforced concrete (a novelty at the time) with two floors, it was considered a modern building, not only in the Bender County but in the entire governorate. The cellar had the capacity to store around 300,000 liters of wine in barrels.

In 2011, the winery renovation, which was to become a tourist attraction, began. When it was rebuilt, it was named "Castel Mimi" in honor of its founder. The renovation work was completed in September 2016.

The Mimi Castle hosted the second summit of the European Political Community (EPC) on 1 June 2023.

== Castel Mimi tourist complex ==
With the renovation of the Castel Mimi tourist complex, the following was also completed: a museum, an art gallery for young artists, a conference hall, a hotel, a spa, a restaurant, some studios of both folk art and culinary arts, as well as several party halls: in the manor house are four large halls for 100 to 120 guests, two wine tasting rooms and six rooms in the basement.

== Gallery ==
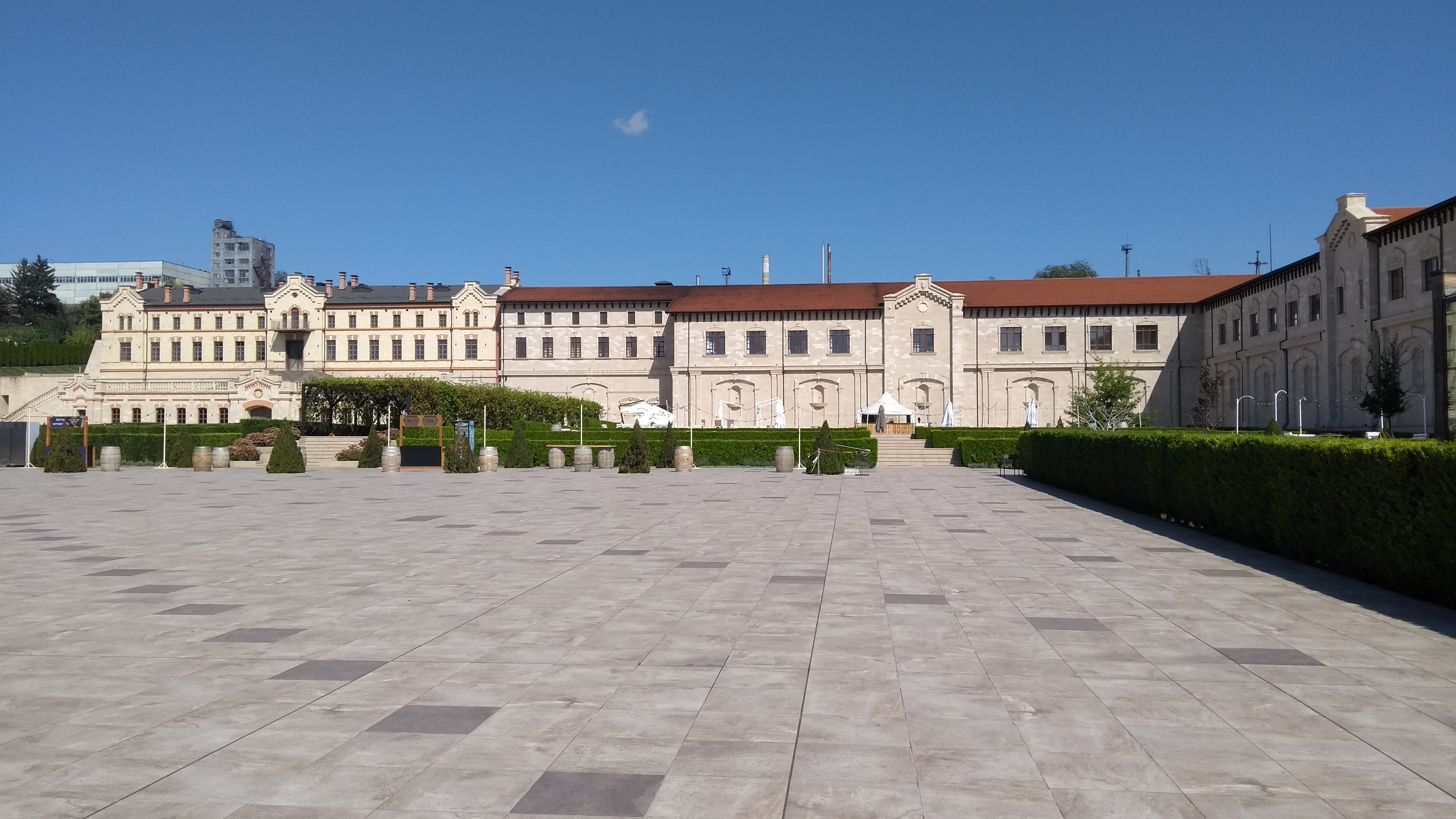
General view

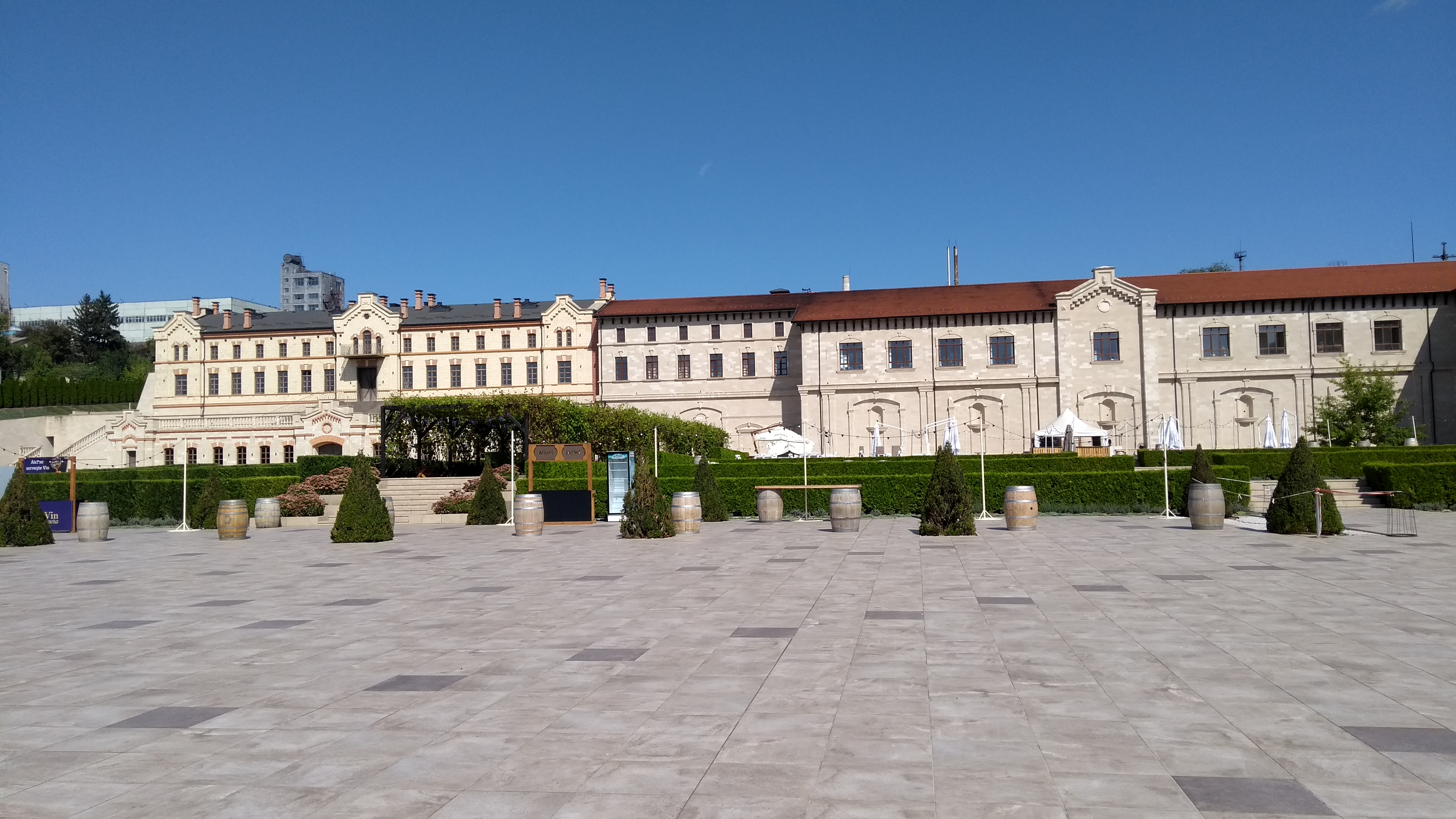

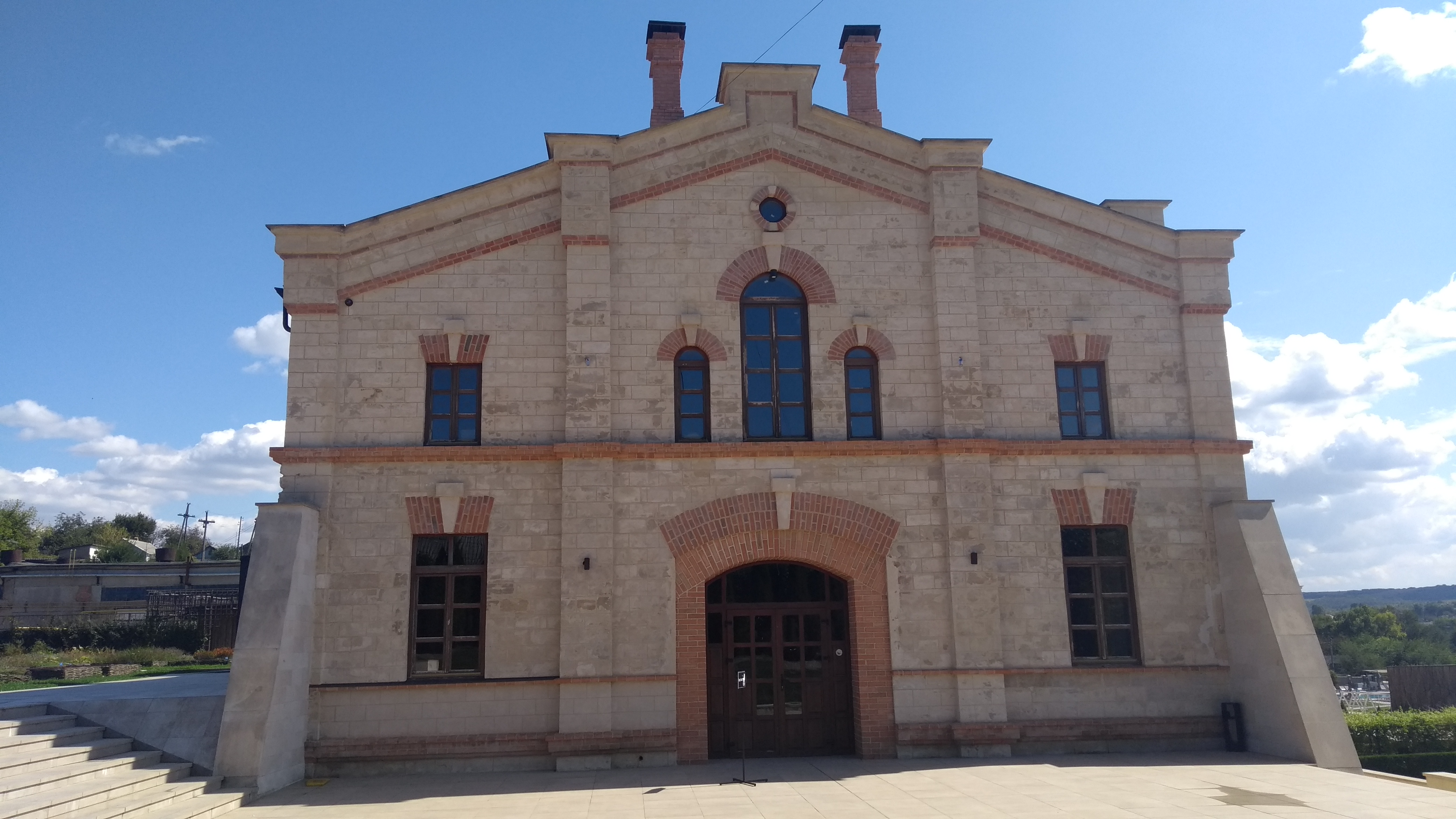
Side view

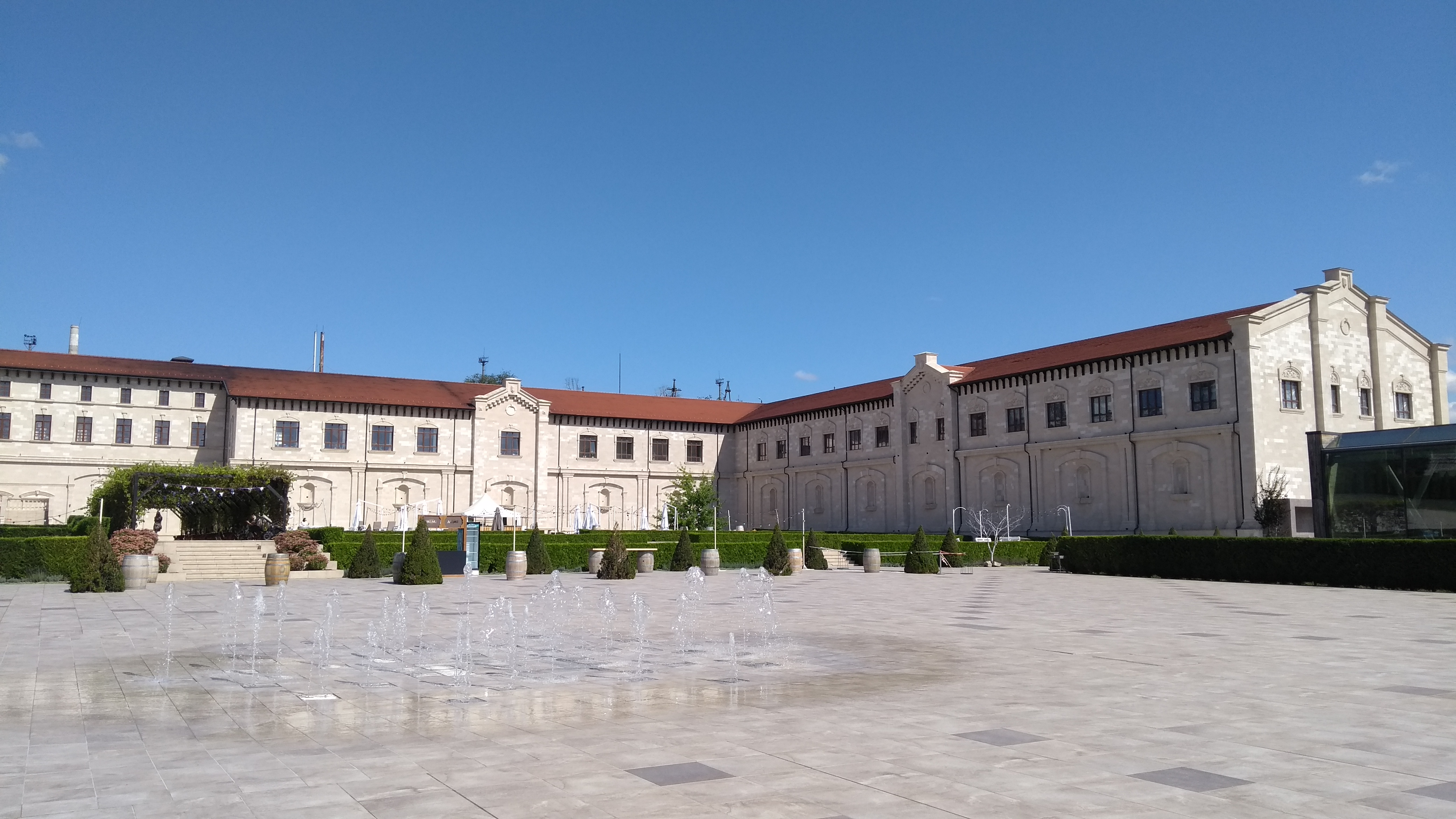

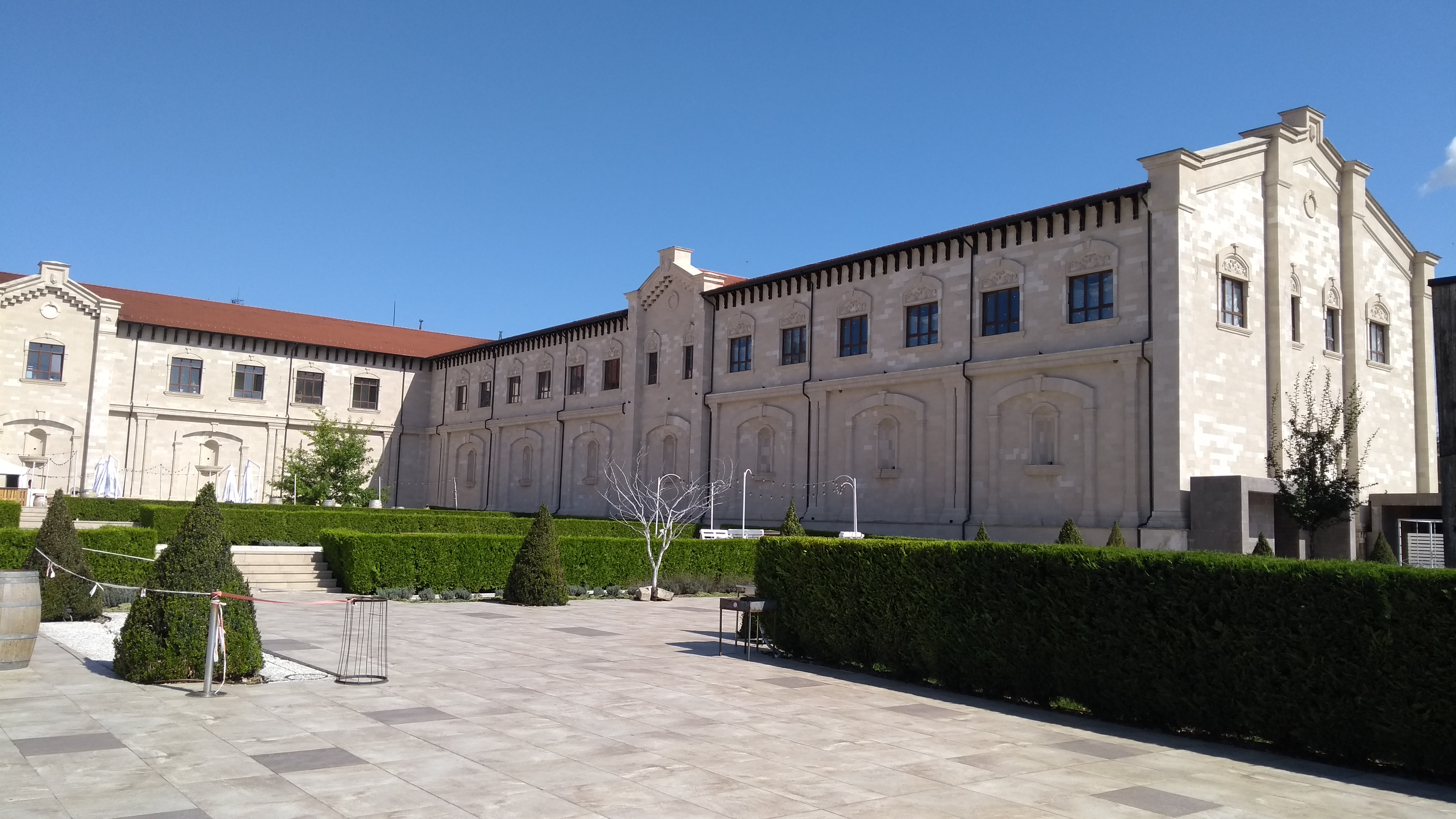

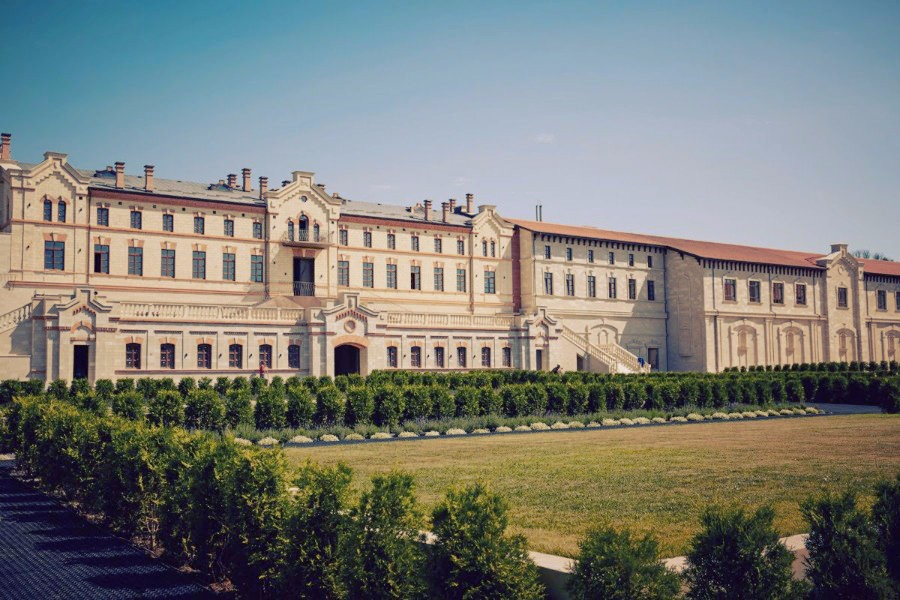
Mimi Castle in 2017
