= Bulboaca, Anenii Noi =

Bulboaca
- Commune and village
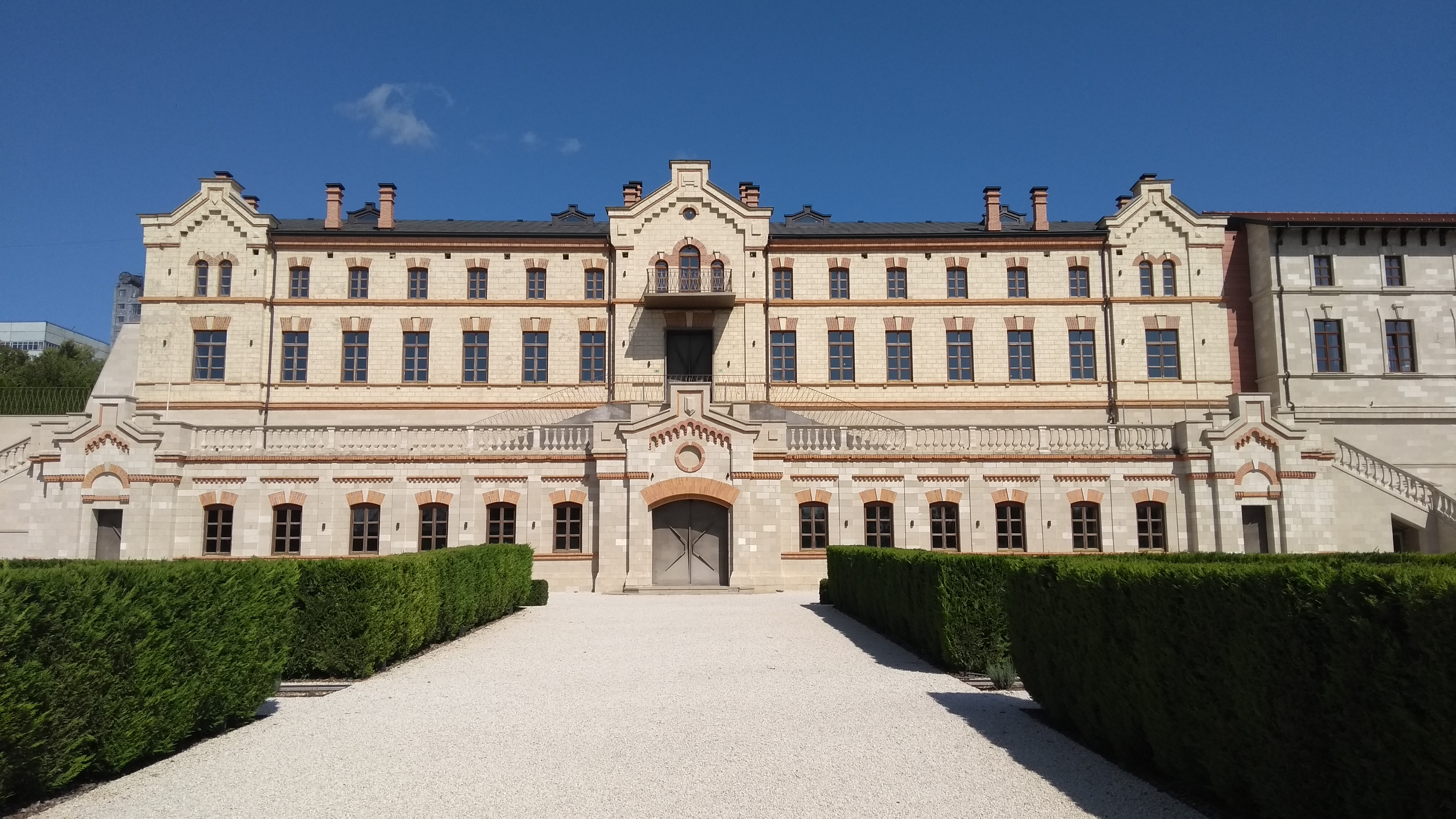
- Mimi Castle in Bulboaca

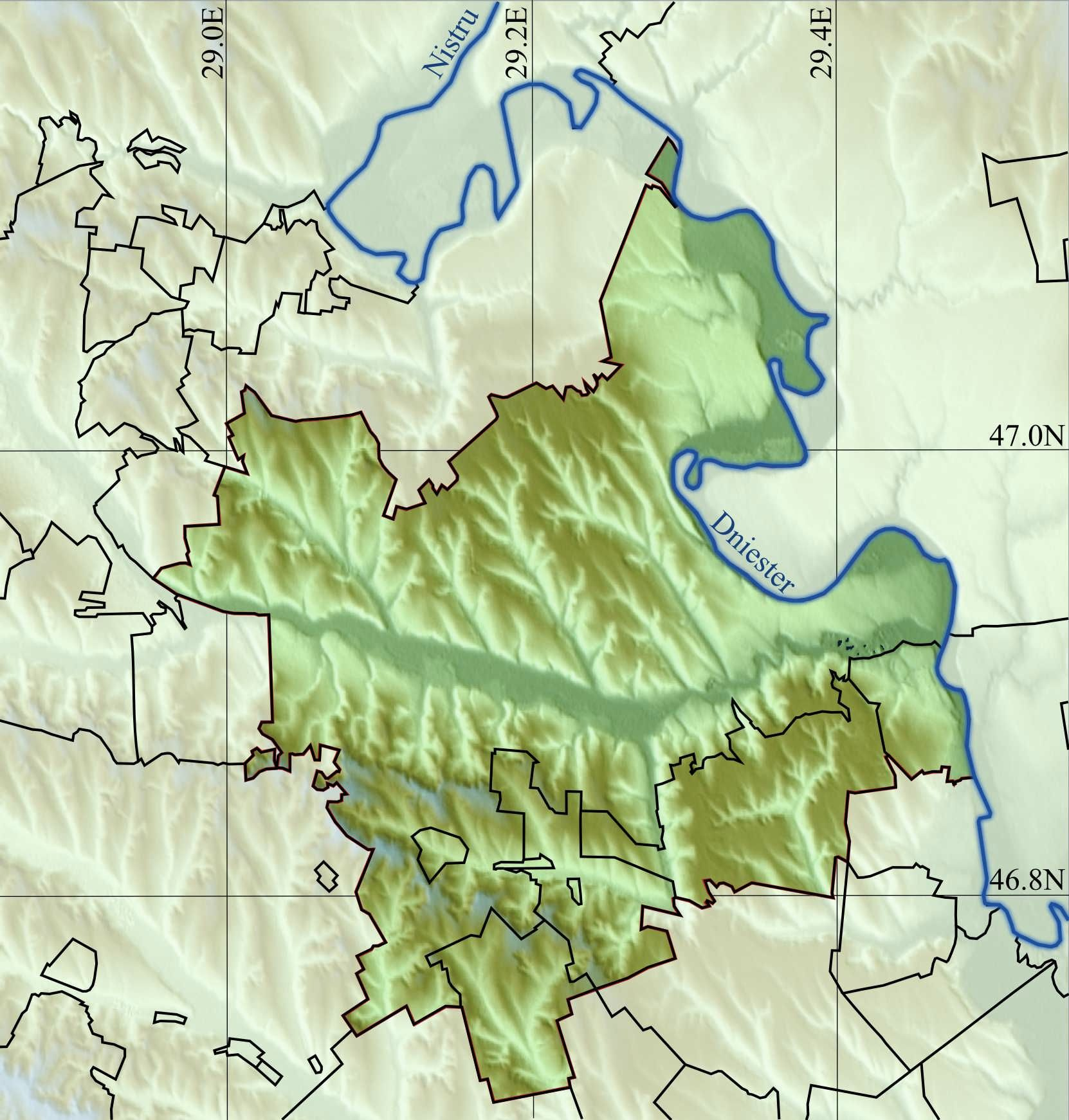
- Location within Anenii Noi District Location within Moldova
- Coordinates: 46°53′0.02″N 29°18′33.43″E
- Country: Moldova
- District: Anenii Noi District

Population (2014 census)
  - Total: 5,036
- Time zone: UTC+2 (EET)
  - Summer (DST): UTC+3 (EEST)

Bulboaca is a commune and village in the Anenii Noi District of the Republic of Moldova. There is located the Mimi Castle.

On 1 June 2023, Moldova hosted in Bulboaca, at the Mimi Castle, the second summit of the European Political Community (EPC).
