= 2nd European Political Community Summit =

European Political Community Summit

2nd European Political Community Summit Al doilea summit al Comunității Politice Europene

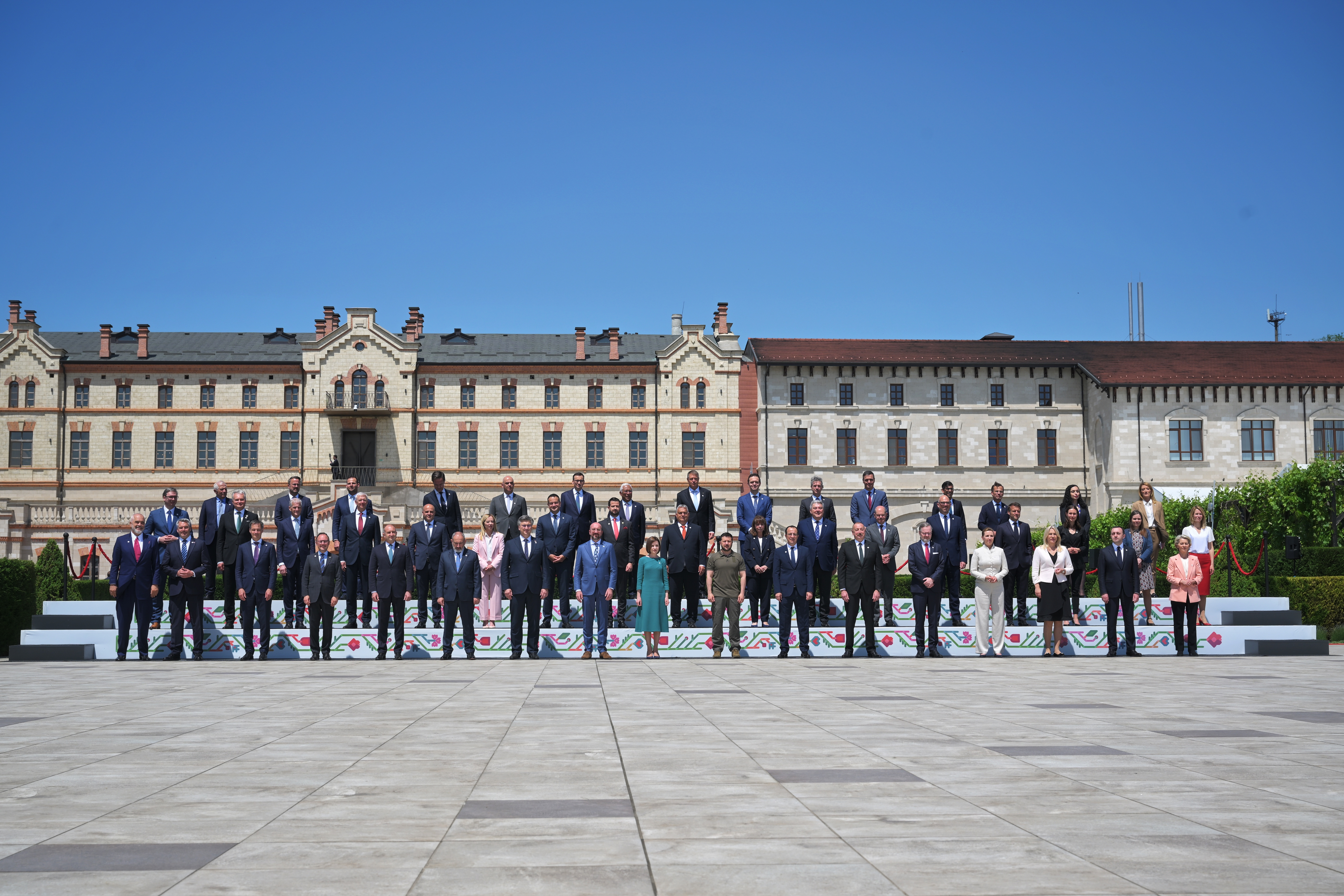
- European leaders at the 2nd EPC Summit
- Host country: Moldova
- Date: 1 June 2023
- Cities: Bulboaca
- Venues: Mimi Castle
- Participants: 45 states
- Chair: Maia Sandu, President of Moldova
- Follows: 1st
- Precedes: 3rd
- Website: https://epcsummit2023.md/

The Second European Political Community Summit was a meeting of the European Political Community held on 1 June 2023 at Mimi Castle, Bulboaca, 35 kilometres (22 miles) from Chișinău, Moldova. It was attended by forty-five heads of states and governments, as well as leaders of European Union institutions.

== Aims ==
The focus of discussions for the summit included securing key infrastructure such as pipelines, cables, and satellites; stepping up the fight against cyberattacks, creating a support fund for Ukraine, working out a common, pan-European energy policy and looking into the possibility of having more university and student exchanges.

In the official statement announcing the date of the summit, Moldovan President Maia Sandu stated that the discussions will include "joint efforts for peace, in the context of the war in Ukraine and related crises, the defense of democracy, the strengthening of energy security and the resilience of European states".

According to the official website for the summit, the main focus of discussions was to be on the following three topics: joint efforts for peace and security; energy resilience and climate action; and interconnections in Europe for a better connected and more stable continent.

== Preparation ==
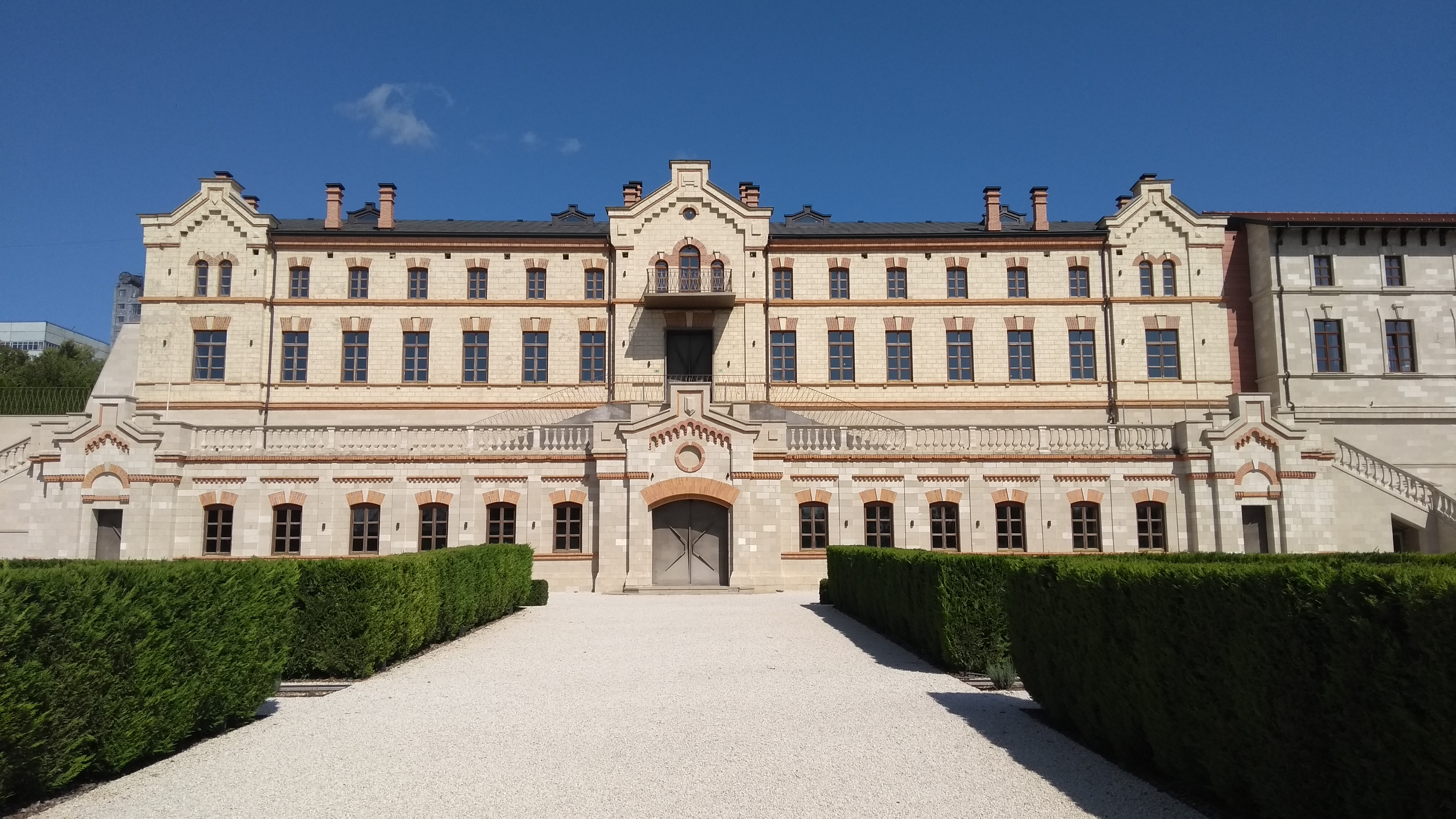
Mimi Castle hosted the 2nd EPC summit on 1 June 2023

A brainstorming session on the future shape of the European Political Community was held by Moldovan foreign minister Nicu Popescu in Paris on 22 November 2022. Preparations and agendas for the summit were further discussed at a meeting of OSCE foreign ministers in Łódź, Poland in December 2022. On 12 January 2023, it was announced by Moldovan President Maia Sandu, that the summit would be held on 1 June 2023. On 21 January 2023, it was confirmed that San Marino has joined the European Political Community and will be attending the summit. A preparatory meeting for the summit, involving officials from the participating states, was held on 26 January 2022 at the headquarters of the European Council in Brussels. On 3 February 2023, Popescu announced that the venue for the summit had been decided upon and would be made public in due course. Popescu discussed arrangements and preparations for the summit on the fringes of a meeting of the EU Foreign Affairs Council on 20 February 2023. On 2 March 2023, it was announced that the summit would take place at Mimi Castle, a private winery 35 kilometres (22 miles) from Chișinău. It has been reported that the heads of government of Andorra and Monaco will also attend this summit. On 17 March 2023, French president Emmanuel Macron spoke to Moldovan president Maia Sandu and reassured her that in the face of Russia's hybrid-war against her country, France would provide all necessary support requested to facilitate the organization of the summit. An official website, Twitter account and Facebook account for the summit were launched on 27 April 2023. On 21 May 2023, the large pro-European rally European Moldova National Assembly took place in Chișinău. On 22 May 2023, Moldovan media celebrated the existence of a dedicated Wikipedia article about the summit, believing it represents "recognition of the importance of the event, both at the international political level and among the population". A final preparatory meeting took place at the headquarters of the European Council in Brussels on 26 May 2023 and a pre-summit press briefing took place there on 30 May 2023. Moldova released a commemorative postage stamp to mark the summit.

== Schedule and agenda ==
The summit took place on 1 June 2023 and was structured as follows (EET):

- 10:00 – Arrivals, doorsteps and welcome
- 12:00 – Plenary session with opening remarks by Chair Maia Sandu (Moldova) followed by contributions from Volodymyr Zelenskyy (Ukraine), Giorgia Meloni (Italy), Klaus Iohannis (Romania) and Mark Rutte (Netherlands)
- 12:30 – Family photo
- 12:45 – Roundtable discussions on joint efforts for peace and security; energy resilience and climate action; and interconnections in Europe
- 13:45 – Working lunch followed by time for bilateral meetings
- 15:30 – Armenia–Azerbaijan meeting
- 17:00 – General press conference by the leaders of the Hosting Trio; Maia Sandu (Moldova), Pedro Sánchez (Spain) and Petr Fiala (Czech Republic) followed by national press briefings by Volodymyr Zelenskyy (Ukraine), Emmanuel Macron (France), Olaf Scholz (Germany) and Vjosa Osmani (Kosovo).

== Participants ==
Countries that were invited to the summit

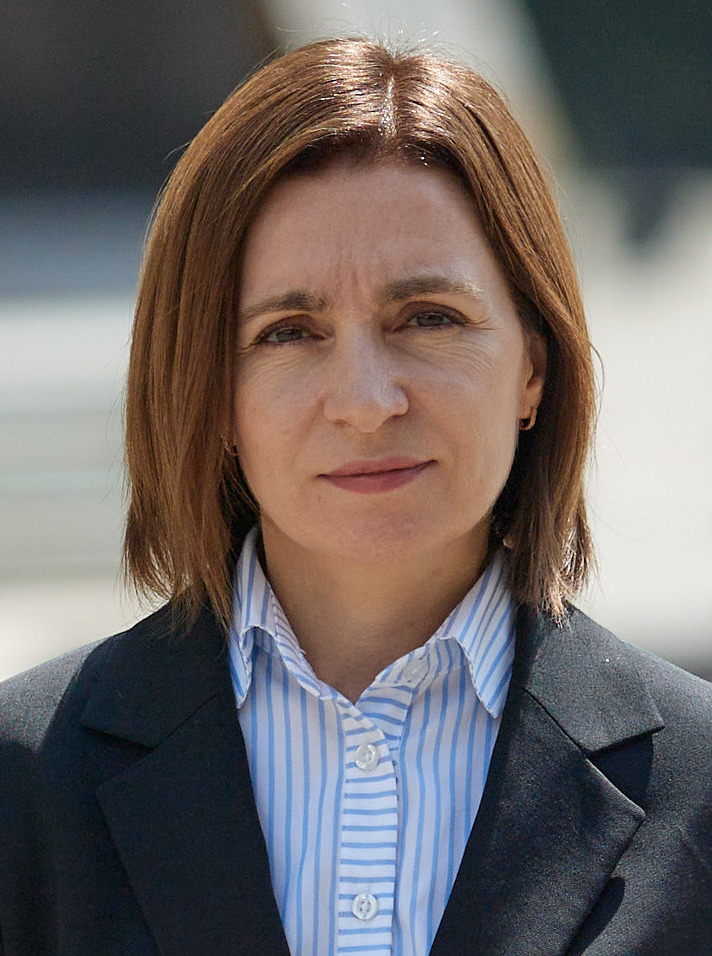
Moldovan president Maia Sandu chaired the plenary session of the summit

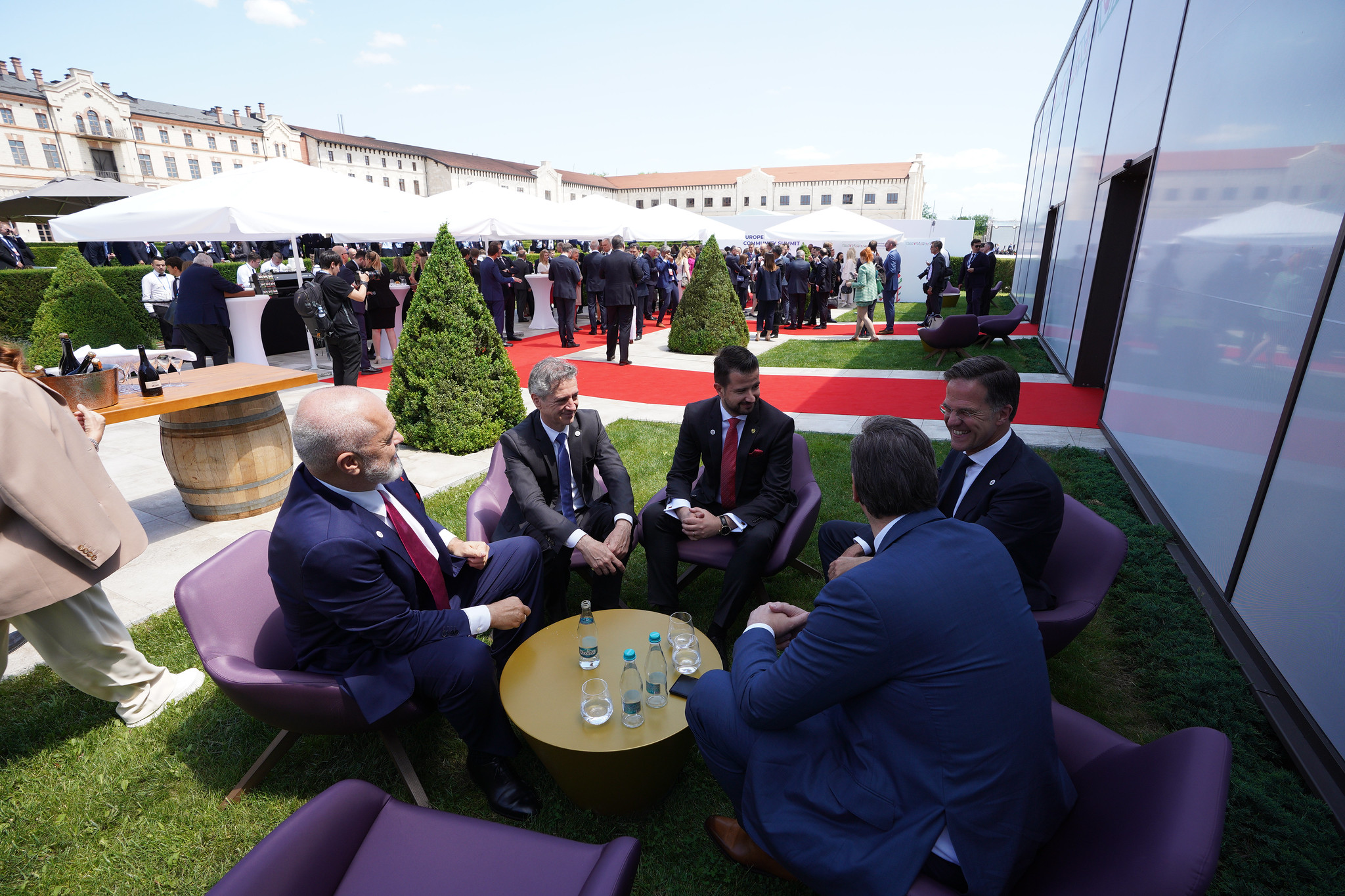
Fringe meeting at the 2nd European Political Community Summit

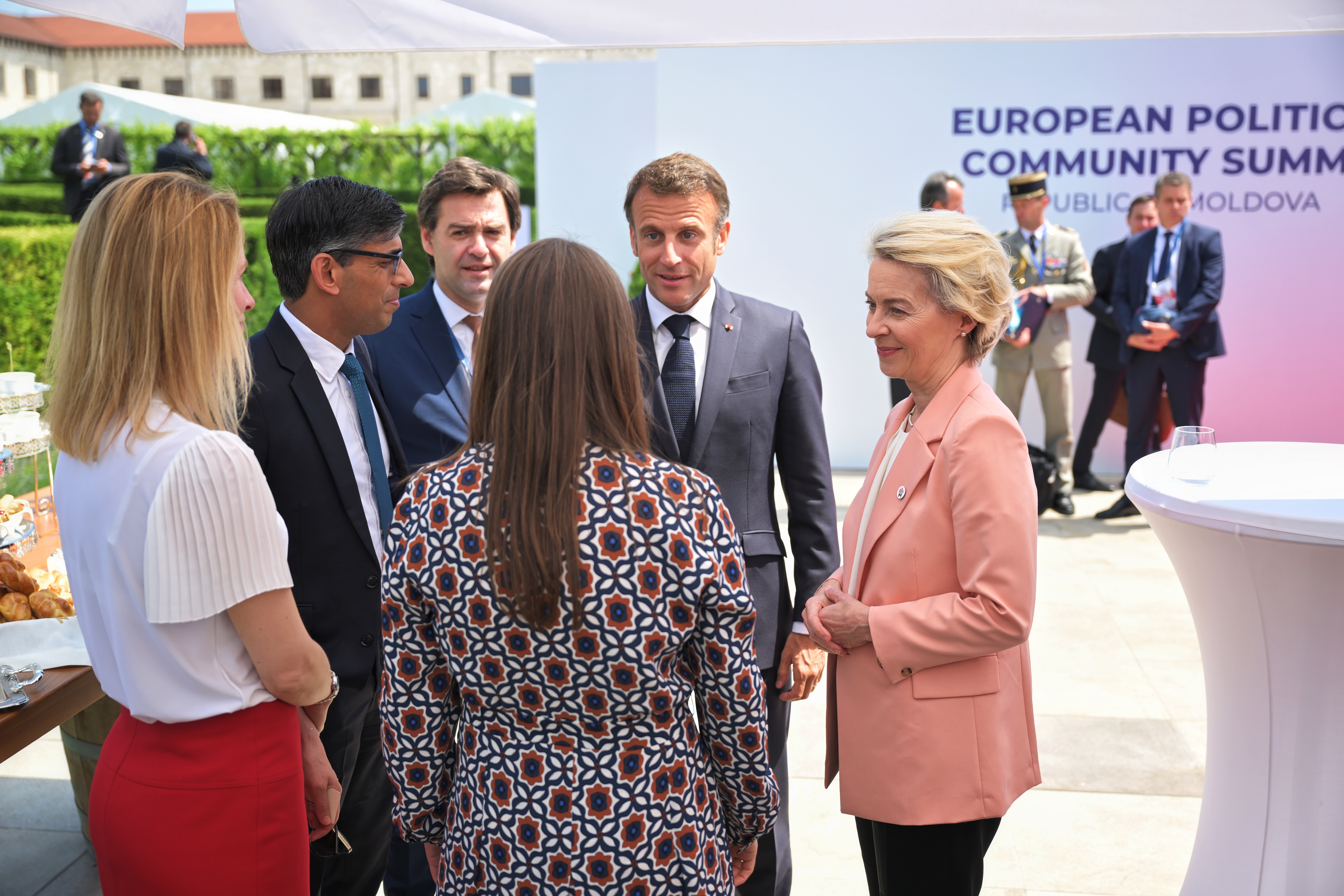
Informal discussions at the 2nd European Political Community Summit

The summit was attended by the heads of state or government of the states participating in the European Political Community along with the President of the European Council, the President of the European Commission and the President of the European Parliament. Forty-seven heads of states or governments were invited to attend. On the eve of the summit, it was announced that Turkish president Recep Tayyip Erdoğan would not be able to attend. The head of government of San Marino, Luca Beccari, was unable to attend as he was on a visit to Cuba.

The following heads of state or government attended the summit:

Key
Absent

Member		Represented by	Title
(Albania)	Albania	Edi Rama	Prime Minister
(Andorra)	Andorra	Xavier Espot Zamora	Prime Minister
(Armenia)	Armenia	Nikol Pashinyan	Prime Minister
(Austria)	Austria	Karl Nehammer	Chancellor
(Azerbaijan)	Azerbaijan	Ilham Aliyev	President
(Belgium)	Belgium	Alexander De Croo	Prime Minister
(Bosnia and Herzegovina)	Bosnia and Herzegovina	Željka Cvijanović	Chairwoman of the Presidency
(Bulgaria)	Bulgaria	Rumen Radev	President
(Croatia)	Croatia	Andrej Plenković	Prime Minister
(Cyprus)	Cyprus	Nikos Christodoulides	President
(Czech Republic)	Czech Republic	Petr Fiala	Prime Minister
(Denmark)	Denmark	Mette Frederiksen	Prime Minister
(Estonia)	Estonia	Kaja Kallas	Prime Minister
(European Union)	European Union		
(European Union)	European Union	Josep Borrell	High Representative of the Union for Foreign Affairs and Security Policy
(European Union)	European Union	Charles Michel	President of the European Council
(European Union)	European Union	Ursula von der Leyen	President of the European Commission
(European Union)	European Union	Roberta Metsola	President of the European Parliament
(Finland)	Finland	Sanna Marin	Prime Minister
(France)	France	Emmanuel Macron	President
(Georgia (country))	Georgia	Irakli Garibashvili	Prime Minister
(Germany)	Germany	Olaf Scholz	Chancellor
(Greece)	Greece	Katerina Sakellaropoulou	President
(Hungary)	Hungary	Viktor Orbán	Prime Minister
(Iceland)	Iceland	Katrín Jakobsdóttir	Prime Minister
(Republic of Ireland)	Ireland	Leo Varadkar	Taoiseach
(Italy)	Italy	Giorgia Meloni	Prime Minister
(Kosovo)	Kosovo	Vjosa Osmani	President
(Latvia)	Latvia	Krišjānis Kariņš	Prime Minister
(Liechtenstein)	Liechtenstein	Daniel Risch	Prime Minister
(Lithuania)	Lithuania	Gitanas Nausėda	President
(Luxembourg)	Luxembourg	Xavier Bettel	Prime Minister
(Malta)	Malta	Robert Abela	Prime Minister
(Moldova)	Moldova	Maia Sandu	President
(Monaco)	Monaco	Pierre Dartout	Minister of State
(Montenegro)	Montenegro	Jakov Milatović	President
(Netherlands)	Netherlands	Mark Rutte	Prime Minister
(North Macedonia)	North Macedonia	Dimitar Kovačevski	Prime Minister
(Norway)	Norway	Jonas Gahr Støre	Prime Minister
(Poland)	Poland	Mateusz Morawiecki	Prime Minister
(Portugal)	Portugal	António Costa	Prime Minister
(Romania)	Romania	Klaus Iohannis	President
(San Marino)	San Marino		
(Serbia)	Serbia	Aleksandar Vučić	President
(Slovakia)	Slovakia	Ľudovít Ódor	Prime Minister
(Slovenia)	Slovenia	Robert Golob	Prime Minister
(Spain)	Spain	Pedro Sánchez	Prime Minister
(Sweden)	Sweden	Ulf Kristersson	Prime Minister
(Switzerland)	Switzerland	Alain Berset	President
(Turkey)	Turkey		
(Ukraine)	Ukraine	Volodymyr Zelenskyy	President
(United Kingdom)	United Kingdom	Rishi Sunak	Prime Minister

== Outcomes ==
=== Moldova's security ===
On 24 April 2023, European Union member states agreed to deploy a Common Security and Defence Policy (CSDP) civilian mission to Moldova to help the country deal with hybrid threats it faces as a result of the 2022 Russian invasion of Ukraine. The mission was formally launched during the summit.

Moldovan president Maia Sandu has stated that the hosting of the summit in the country will help ensure security by sending a clear message that "Moldova has numerous and powerful friends, who support us in our desire to maintain peace and stability" and that "in these difficult times, when Russia continues to wage an inhumane war against Ukraine, the diplomatic support provided by this event is invaluable.

The summit coincided with an €87m contribution to non-military logistical aid from the European Peace Facility. The equipment provided includes drones, laptops, explosive ordnance disposal equipment, ultrasound machines, personal protection and surgical kits.

=== Ukraine's security ===
Ukrainian president Volodymyr Zelenskyy attended the summit in person, having spoken at the previous summit via video link. He used his address at the main plenary session to ask for more aid and weapons adding that his country was prepared to join the European Union and NATO as quickly as possible. He also asked for interim security guarantees for both Ukraine and Moldova, proposals that were supported by France and Germany. Lithuanian president Gitanas Nauseda, who will host the next NATO summit in July 2023, urged the alliance to adopt a clear road map for Ukraine's accession.

=== Kosovo–Moldova relations ===
Host nation Moldova has not recognized the independence of Kosovo and usually refused admission to holders of Kosovar passports which could have led to issues with delegates from Kosovo attending the summit. However, in the lead up to the summit, legislation was progressed in the Moldovan parliament to acknowledge that Kosovar passports are valid travel documents allowing holders to apply for electronic visas to enter Moldova.

=== Armenia–Azerbaijan relations ===
A meeting between Armenian Prime Minister Nikol Pashinyan and Azeri President Ilham Aliyev with Emmanuel Macron, Olaf Scholz, Charles Michel was held at the summit, building on progress made at negotiations held in Prague in October 2022, in five meetings in Brussels, and at a May 2023 meeting in Washington. A similar meeting at the previous summit in October 2022, led to the deployment of a European Union mission to help monitor the border between the two countries. The leaders of both countries met in Moscow on 25 May 2023 and it was reported by Reuters that further progress towards a peace agreement could be made at the summit. At the summit, discussions focused on the unblocking of regional transport, economic infrastructure, border delimitation and security, the rights and security of the population of Nagorno-Karabakh, and prisoners of war and missing persons. Both agreed to meet again on 21 July in Brussels.

=== Kosovo–Serbia relations ===
The President of France, Emmanuel Macron, has announced that on Thursday, June 1, he will hold separate meetings with the Chancellor of Germany, Olaf Scholz, and the President of Kosovo, Vjosa Osmani, and President of Serbia, Aleksandar Vučić. Macron and Scholz were also able to organize a face to face meeting between Vučić and Osmani on the fringes of the summit. These meetings are being convened in response to the 2022–2023 North Kosovo crisis. The crisis reached its peak on Monday 29 May when KFOR peacekeeping troops were attacked by a group of violent protesters, whom the Kosovo government claims to be "Serbian criminal gangs". Following the summit, Macron and Scholz suggested that new elections could be held in four ethnic Serb majority municipalities in northern Kosovo as a way resolve the crisis. In her post-summit press briefing, Osmani stated that the law on municipal self-governance in Kosovo allows for a recall election to be held in a municipality if 20% of the registered electors in that municipality sign a petition requesting one and that a solution to the crisis was close. Vučić stated that ethnic Serbs in northern Kosovo wanted to see the withdrawal of special Kosovo Police units from the area and did not want to be ruled by "illegal mayors". Macron said they had asked both sides to come back next week with "clear answers".

=== Migration to the United Kingdom ===
During the summit, British prime minister Rishi Sunak stated that he would ensure "tackling migration is firmly on the international agenda", added that he would "take the lead" on the issue and vowed to "stop the boats". Some media outlets in the UK reported that Sunak was meeting with "EU leaders" at an "asylum summit" and GB News referred to the summit as the "Moldova migrant meeting". UK Media also stated that that migration was "top of the agenda" when in fact, immigration and asylum were not on the published agenda at all.

== See also ==
- European integration
- Pan-European identity
- Politics of Europe
