= List of international trips made by prime ministers of Italy =

The following is a list of international prime ministerial trips made by prime ministers of Italy in reverse chronological order.

== Summary ==
As of 18 August 2025, the number of visits per country/territory where prime ministers have travelled the start of premiership of Matteo Renzi since 2014 are:

- One visit to Afghanistan, Armenia, Australia, Bulgaria, Chile, Colombia, Croatia, Cuba, Denmark, Eritrea, Estonia, Finland, Iceland, Indonesia, Iran, Ivory Coast, Jordan, Kenya, Kuwait, Luxembourg, Mexico, Moldova, Nigeria, Peru, Senegal, South Africa, South Korea, Turkmenistan, and Vietnam
- Two visits to Azerbaijan, Bahrain, Brazil, Ghana, Hungary, Iraq, Iraqi Kurdistan, Kazakhstan, Latvia, Lithuania, Mozambique, Oman, Palestine, Republic of the Congo, Serbia, Slovenia, and Sweden
- Three visits to Albania, Angola, Argentina, Austria, Cyprus, Czech Republic, Greece, Israel, Lebanon, Malta, Netherlands, Qatar, Romania, and Uzbekistan
- Four visits to Albania, Canada, China, India, Poland, Portugal, Saudi Arabia, Switzerland, and Ukraine
- Five visits to Algeria, Ethiopia, and Vatican City
- Six visits to Japan, Libya, Russia, and Turkey
- Seven visits to Egypt, Spain, and the United Arab Emirates
- Eight visits to Tunisia
- Nine visits to the United Kingdom
- Twelve visits to Germany
- Twenty-one visits to the United States
- Thirty-three visits to France
- Forty visits to Belgium

Countries/Territories	International trips made by					
Countries/Territories	Matteo Renzi (2014–2016)	Paolo Gentiloni (2016–2018)	Giuseppe Conte (2018–2021)	Mario Draghi (2021–2022)	Giorgia Meloni (Since 2022)	Total (Since 2014)
Afghanistan	1	none	none	none	none	1
Albania	1 (2014)	none	none	none	3 (2022, 2024, 2025)	4 (2014, 2022, 2024, 2025)
Algeria	1 (2014)	none	1 (2018)	1 (2022)	1 (2023)	
Angola	1 (2014)	1 (2017)	none	none		
Argentina	1 (2016)	none	1 (2018)	none		
Australia	1 (2014)	none	none	none		
Austria	1 (2014)	none	1 (2018)	none	1 (2023)	
Belgium	2 (2014)	none	8 (2018, 2019, 2020)	6 (2021, 2022)	24 (2022, 2023, 2024, 2025, 2026)	40 (2014, 2018, 2019, 2020, 2021, 2022, 2023, 2024, 2025, 2026)
Brazil	1 (2016)	none	none	none		
Bulgaria	none	none	1 (2020)	none		
Canada	none	1 (2017)	1 (2018)	none	none	1 (2024)
Chile	1 (2015)	none	none	none		
China	2 (2014, 2016)	1 (2017)	none	none	1 (2024)	
Colombia	1 (2015)	none	none	none		
Republic of Congo	1 (2014)	none	none	none	1 (2023)	
Croatia	none	none	none	1 (2023)		
Cuba	1 (2015)	none	none	none		
Cyprus	none	none	1 (2019)	none	1 (2024)	
Czech Republic	none	1 (2017)	none	1 (2022)	1 (2023)	
Egypt	2 (2014, 2015)	none	2 (2019, 2020)	none	3 (2022, 2023, 2024)	7 (2014, 2015, 2019, 2020, 2022, 2023, 2024)
Eritrea	none	none	1 (2018)	none		
Estonia	none	1 (2017)	none	none		
Ethiopia	1 (2015)	none	1 (2018)	none	1 (2023)	
France	4 (2014, 2015)	2 (2017)	3 (2018, 2019, 2020)	5 (2021, 2022)	3 (2023, 2024)	
Germany	4 (2014, 2015, 2016)	3 (2017, 2018)	2 (2018, 2020)	2 (2021, 2022)	2 (2023)	
Ghana	1 (2016)	1 (2017)	none	none		
Greece	none	1 (2017)	none	none	1 (2023)	
Hungary	none	none	none	2 (2023, 2024)		
Iceland	none	none	none	1 (2023)		
Iran	1 (2016)	none	none	none		
Iraq	1 (2014)	none	none	none	1 (2022)	2 (2014, 2022)
Iraqi Kurdistan	1 (2014)	none	none	none	1 (2022)	2 (2014, 2022)
India	1 (2017)	none	1 (2018)	none	2 (2023)	
Israel	1 (2015)	none	none	1 (2022)	1 (2023)	
Ivory Coast	none	1 (2017)	none	none		
Japan	2 (2015, 2016)	none	1 (2019)	none	2 (2023, 2024)	
Jordan	none	none	none	1 (2024)		
Kazakhstan	1 (2014)	none	none	none		
Kenya	1 (2015)	none	none	none		
Kuwait	none	1 (2017)	none	none		
Latvia	1 (2015)	none	none	none	1 (2023)	
Lebanon	1 (2015)	none	2 (2019, 2020)	none	2 (2024)	
Libya	none	none	1 (2018)	1 (2021)	4 (2023, 2024)	
Lithuania	none	none	none	none	1 (2023)	
Luxembourg	none	none	none	none		
Malta	1 (2015)	none	1 (2019)	none	1 (2023)	
Mexico	1 (2016)	none	none	none		
Moldova	none	none	none	1 (2023)		
Mozambique	1 (2014)	none	none	none	1 (2023)	
Netherlands	1 (2016)	none	1 (2020)	none		
Nigeria	1 (2016)	none	none	none		
Oman	none	none	1 (2019)	none		
Palestine	1 (2015)	none	none	1 (2022)		
Peru	1 (2015)	none	none	none		
Poland	none	none	none	none	2 (2023)	
Portugal	none	2 (2017)	1 (2020)	1 (2021)		
Qatar	none	1 (2017)	none	none	1 (2023)	
Romania	1 (2014)	1 (2018)	1 (2019)	none		
Russia	2 (2015, 2016)	1 (2017)	1 (2018)	none	none	
Saudi Arabia	1 (2015)	1 (2017)	none	none		
Senegal	1 (2016)	none	none	none		
Serbia	none	none	none	1 (2023)		
Slovenia	none	1 (2017)	none	1 (2021)		
Spain	1 (2016)	2 (2017)	1 (2020)	2 (2021, 2022)	1 (2023)	
Sweden	none	1 (2017)	none	none	1 (2023)	
Switzerland	none	1 (2018)	1 (2019)	none	1 (2024)	
Tunisia	none	none	none	3 (2023, 2024)		
Turkey	2 (2014, 2015)	none	1 (2020)	1 (2022)	1 (2024)	
Turkmenistan	1 (2014)	none	none	none		
Ukraine	1 (2015)	none	none	1 (2022)	2 (2023, 2024)	
United Arab Emirates	1 (2015)	2 (2017, 2018)	2 (2018, 2019)	none	2 (2023)	
United Kingdom	3 (2014)	1 (2017)	2 (2019, 2020)	2 (2021)	3 (2023, 2024)	
United States	7 (2014, 2015, 2016)	2 (2017)	2 (2018)	2 (2022)	5 (2023, 2024)	
Uzbekistan	none	none	none	1 (2024)		
Vatican City	none	none	none	none	5 (2023, 2024, 2025)	5 (2023, 2024, 2025)
Vietnam	1 (2014)	none	none	none		

== Italian Republic (1946–present) ==
=== Enrico Letta (2013–2014) ===
List of foreign visits by Enrico Letta
City and Country	Dates	Host	Notes
Canada	2013	Prime Minister Stephen Harper	

=== Mario Monti (2011–2013) ===
List of foreign visits by Mario Monti
City and Country	Dates	Host	Notes

=== Silvio Berlusconi (2008–2011) ===
List of foreign visits by Silvio Berlusconi
City and Country	Dates	Host	Notes
Brazil	2009	President Luiz Inácio Lula da Silva	
Brazil	2010	President Luiz Inácio Lula da Silva	
Canada	2010	Prime Minister Stephen Harper	

=== Romano Prodi (2006–2008) ===
List of foreign visits by Romano Prodi
City and Country	Dates	Host	Notes
Brazil	2006	President Luiz Inácio Lula da Silva	
Brazil	2007	President Luiz Inácio Lula da Silva	
Buenos Aires, Argentina	2007	President Néstor Kirchner	

=== Silvio Berlusconi (2001–2006) ===
List of foreign visits by Silvio Berlusconi
City and Country	Dates	Host	Notes
Canada	2002	Prime Minister Jean Chrétien	

=== Giuliano Amato (2000–2001) ===
List of foreign visits by Giuliano Amato
City and Country	Dates	Host	Notes
Canada	2001	Prime Minister Jean Chrétien	

=== Massimo D'Alema (1998–2000) ===
List of foreign visits by Massimo D'Alema
City and Country	Dates	Host	Notes

=== Romano Prodi (1996–1998) ===
List of foreign visits by Romano Prodi
City and Country	Dates	Host	Notes

=== Lamberto Dini (1994–1996) ===
List of foreign visits by Lamberto Dini
City and Country	Dates	Host	Notes

=== Silvio Berlusconi (1994–1995) ===
List of foreign visits by Silvio Berlusconi
City and Country	Dates	Host	Notes

=== Bettino Craxi (1983–1987) ===
List of foreign visits by Bettino Craxi
City and Country	Dates	Host	Notes
Buenos Aires, Argentina	1983	President Reynaldo Bignone	

== Kingdom of Italy (1900–1946) ==
=== Benito Mussolini (1922–1943) ===
List of foreign visits by Benito Mussolini
City and Country	Dates	Host	Notes
Paris, France	1 January 1935	Prime Minister Pierre Laval	
Berlin, Nazi Germany	September 1937	Chancellor Adolf Hitler	
Munich, Nazi Germany	30 September 1938	Chancellor Adolf Hitler	Munich Agreement

== See also ==
- List of international trips made by presidents of Iran
- List of international trips made by prime ministers of India
- List of international trips made by prime ministers of the United Kingdom
- List of international trips made by United States secretaries of state
