= List of international prime ministerial trips made by Giuseppe Conte =

This is a list of international prime ministerial trips made by Giuseppe Conte, who served as the 58th Prime Minister of Italy from 1 June 2018 until 13 February 2021.

== Summary of international trips ==
Map of international trips made by Giuseppe Conte as Prime Minister: Italy 1 visit 2 visits 5 visits

Number of visits	Country
8 visits	Belgium
3 visits	France, United States
2 visits	Egypt, Germany, Lebanon, Tunisia, United Arab Emirates, United Kingdom
1 visit	Algeria, Argentina, Austria, Bulgaria, Canada, Cyprus, Ethiopia, Eritrea, India, Japan, Libya, Malta, Netherlands, Oman, Portugal, Romania, Russia, Spain, Switzerland, Turkey

== 2018 ==
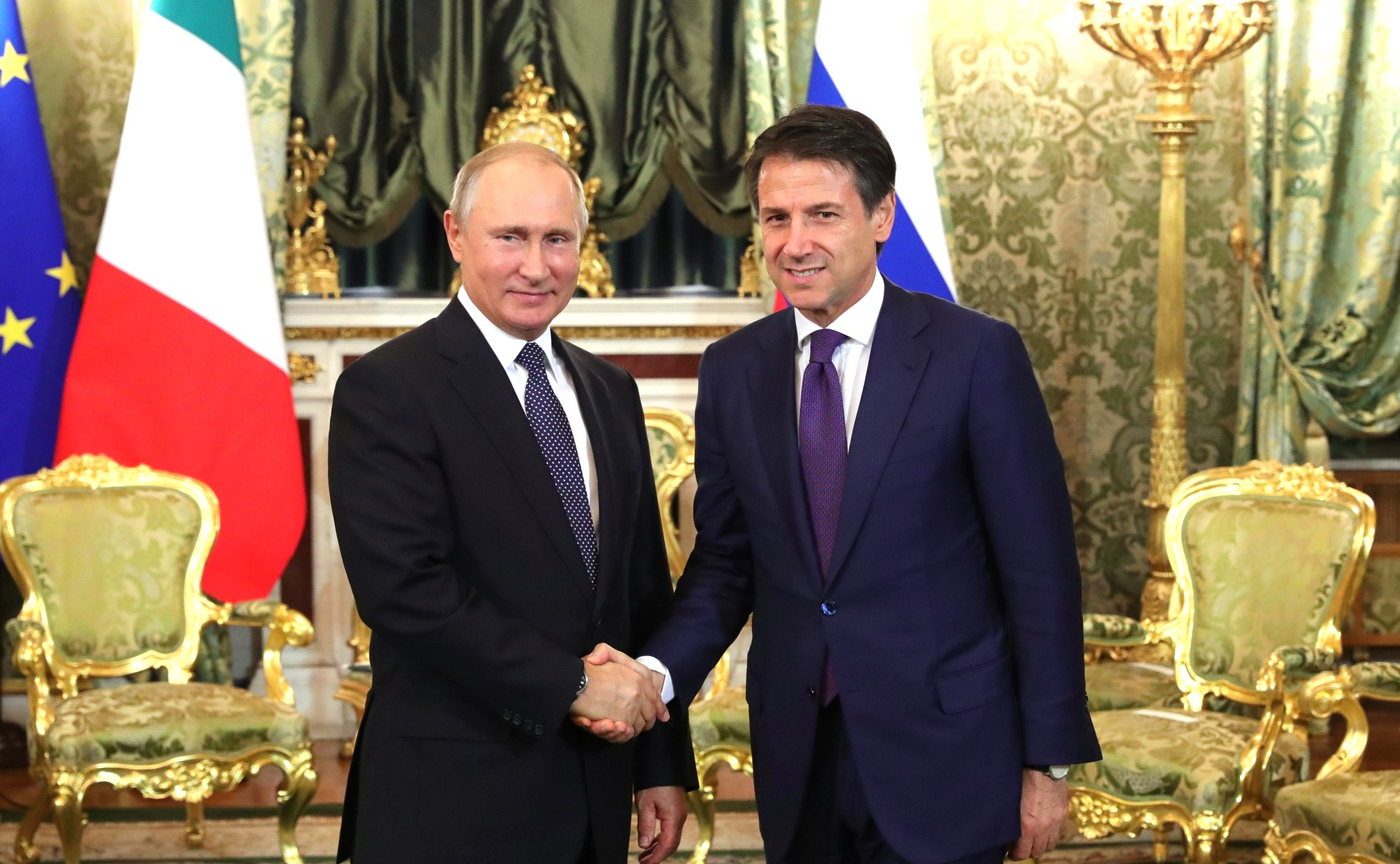
Conte with the Russian President, Vladimir Putin, in Moscow

Country	Areas visited	Date(s)	Notes
Canada	La Malbaie	7–9 June	See also: Canada–Italy relations Prime Minister Conte's state visit to Canada was his first trip outside Italy as head of the government. Conte participated to the 44th G7 summit. During the two days he had bilateral meetings with the President of the European Commission Jean-Claude Juncker, the President of the European Council Donald Tusk, the British Prime Minister Theresa May and with the Japanese Prime Minister Shinzō Abe.
France	Paris	15 June	See also: France–Italy relations Conte met French President Emmanuel Macron at the Élysée Palace. The two leaders mainly discussed about the European migrant crisis and the immigration policy promoted by the new Italian government.
Germany	Berlin	18 June	See also: Germany–Italy relations Conte went to Berlin to meet German Chancellor Angela Merkel. The two leaders mainly discussed about the European migrant crisis and the immigration policy promoted by the new Italian government.
Belgium	Brussels	28–29 June	Conte attended in his first European Council. The main topic of the summit was the contrast to illegal immigration to Europe and the repartition of refugees between the countries.
Belgium	Brussels	11–12 July	Conte participated to the 2018 NATO summit in Brussels. The leaders discussed about fight to global terrorism and the situation in North Africa.
United States	Washington, D.C.	29–30 July	See also: United States–Italy relations Conte met United States President Donald Trump at the White House. The two leaders discussed about immigration, Libyan crisis, global trade and tariffs.
Austria	Salzburg	19–20 September	Conte participated to an informal summit of the European Council. The summit was focused on the contrast to illegal immigration.
United States	New York City	25–26 September	Conte participated to the General Debate of the seventy-third session of the United Nations General Assembly. His first speech as Prime Minister at the General Assembly was focused on immigration, national sovereignty and populism. He met the Secretary-General of the United Nations António Guterres.
Ethiopia	Addis Abeba	11–12 October	See also: Ethiopia–Italy relations Conte met Ethiopian Prime Minister Abiy Ahmed and THE Deputy Chairman of the Commission of the African Union Thomas Kwasi Quartey. Conte discussed with Ahmed about economic investments in the region after the normalization of relations between Ethiopia and Eritrea, after years of tensions and conflict.
Eritrea	Asmara	12 October	See also: Eritrea-Italy relations Conte met Eritrean president Isaias Afwerki. The two leaders discussed about economic growth and investments in the region after the normalization of relations between Ethiopia and Eritrea.
Belgium	Brussels	17–19 October	Conte participated to a meeting of the European Council and an Africa-EU Summit.
Russia	Moscow	24 October	See also: Russia–Italy relations Conte met Russian President Vladimir Putin and Russian Prime Minister Dmitry Medvedev
India	New Delhi	29–30 October	See also: India–Italy relations Conte met Indian Prime minister Narendra Modi
Tunisia	Tunis	2 November	See also: Italy–Tunisia relations Conte met the Tunisian President Beji Caid Essebsi and the Tunisian Prime Minister Youssef Chahed
Algeria	Algeri	5 November	Conte met the Prime Minister of Algeria Ahmed Ouyahia
United Arab Emirates	Abu Dhabi	15 November	Conte met the Crown Prince of Abu Dhabi Mohammed bin Zayed Al Nahyan
Argentina	Buenos Aires	29 November – 1 December	See also: Argentina–Italy relations Conte participated to the 2018 G20 Buenos Aires summit.
Libya	Benghazi	23–24 December	See also: Italy–Libya relations Conte met with Field Marshal Khalifa Haftar.

== 2019 ==
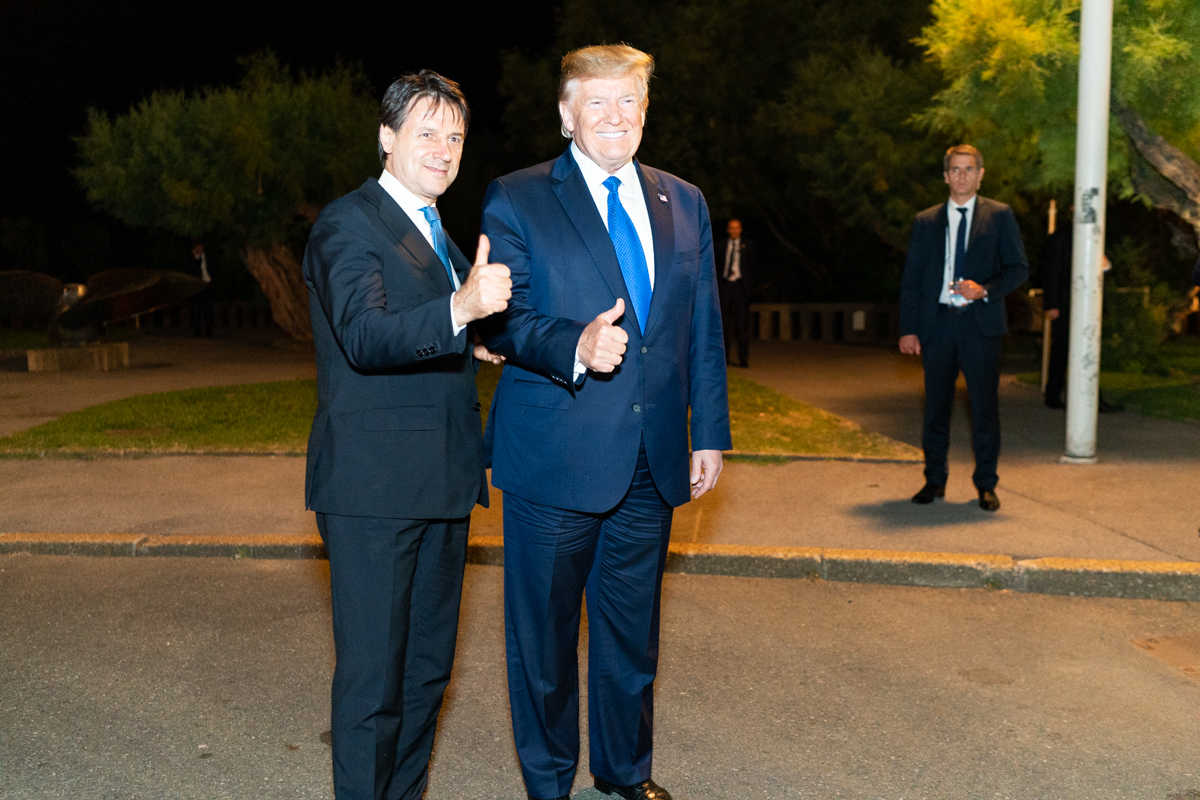
Italian Prime Minister Giuseppe Conte with then-U.S. President Donald Trump at the 45th G7 in Biarritz, August 2019.

Country	Areas visited	Date(s)	Notes
Switzerland	Davos	22 January	Working Visit
United Arab Emirates	Abu Dhabi	27 January	Conte met the Crown Prince of Abu Dhabi Mohammed bin Zayed Al Nahyan
Oman	Muscat	27 January	Conte met with the Sultan Qaboos bin Said.
Cyprus	Nicosia	29 January	Conte attended the EuroMed 7 summit.
Lebanon	Beirut	7 February	Conte met with the president Saad Hariri.
Egypt	Sharm-el-Sheikh	24–25 February	Conte attended the first-ever Arab League-European Union summit.
Belgium	Brussels	21–22 March	Conte attended a summit about extending Article 50 in the Brexit talks.
Qatar	Doha	3 April	Conte met with the Emir Tamim bin Hamad Al Thani.
Belgium	Brussels	10 April	Conte attended an EU Summit over Brexit.
Tunisia	Tunis	30 April	Conte met with prime minister Youssef Chahed and president Beji Caid Essebsi.
Romania	Sibiu	9 May	Conte attended EU summit about the future and Brexit.
Vietnam	Hanoi	5–6 June	Conte met with prime minister Nguyen Xuan Phuc and attended at the High-Level Dialogue on ASEAN-Italy Economic Relation.
Malta	Valletta	14 June	Conte attended the EuroMed 7 summit.
Belgium	Brussels	20–21 June	Conte attended a summit.
Japan	Osaka	27–29 June	See also: Italy–Japan relations Conte participated to the 2019 G20 Osaka summit.
France	Biarritz	24–26 August	See also: France–Italy relations Conte participated to the 45th G7 summit.
United States	New York City	24 September	Attended General debate of the seventy-fourth session of the United Nations General Assembly
United Kingdom	Watford	3-4 December	See also: Italy–United Kingdom relations Conte participated to the 2019 London summit.

== 2020 ==
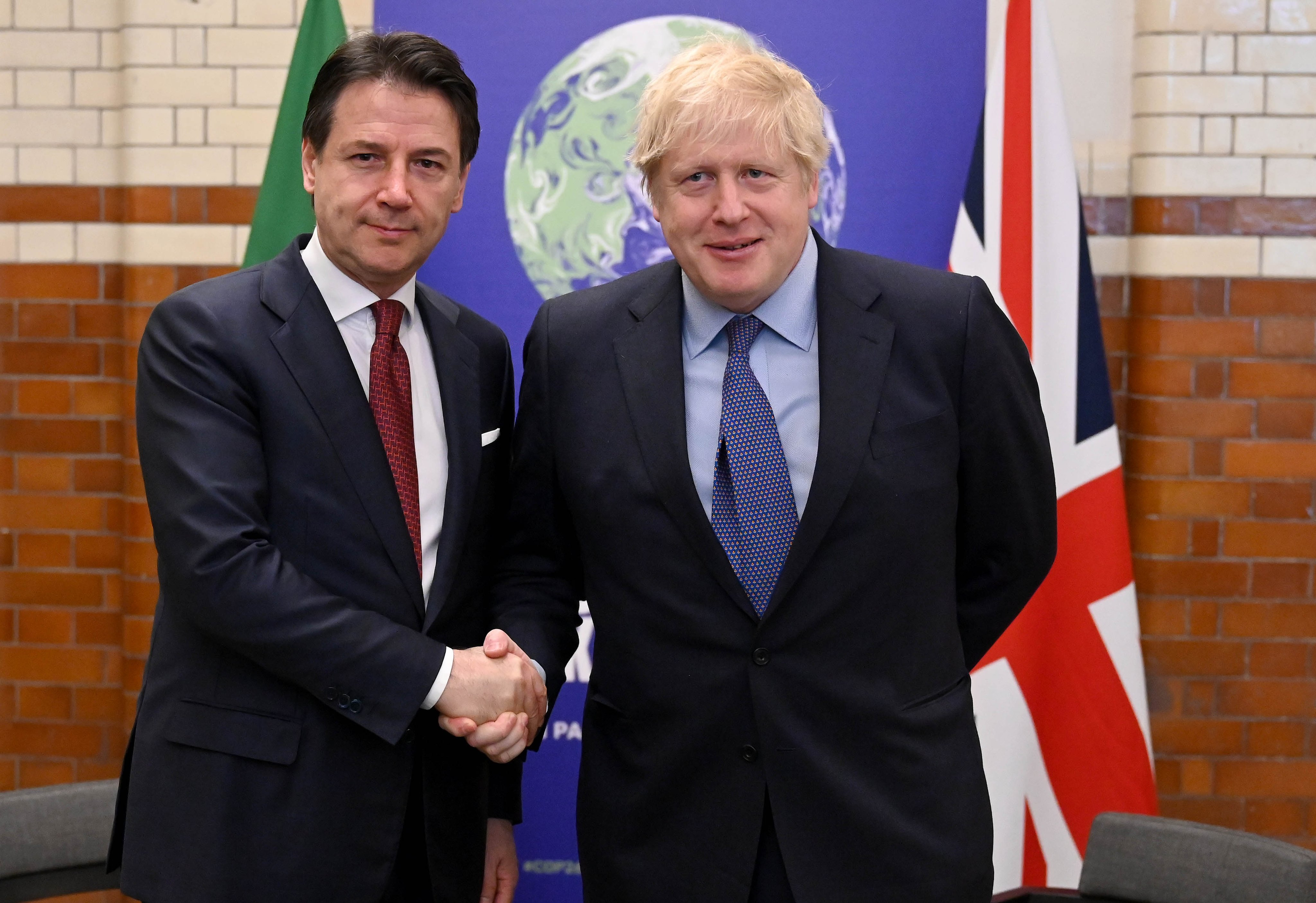
Giuseppe Conte with the U.K. Prime Minister Boris Johnson, in 2020

Country	Areas visited	Date(s)	Notes
Turkey	Ankara	13 January	Conte met the President of Turkey Recep Tayyip Erdogan.
Egypt	Cairo	14 January	Conte met the President of Egypt Abdel Fattah el-Sisi.
Algeria	Algeri	16 January	Conte met the Prime Minister of Algeria Abdelaziz Djerad and the President of Algeria Abdelmadjid Tebboune.
Germany	Berlin	19 January	Conte travelled to Berlin to attend the Berlin Summit on Libya.
Bulgaria	Sofia	30 January	Conte met the Prime Minister of Bulgaria Boyko Borisov.
United Kingdom	London	4 February	Conte met the Prime Minister of the United Kingdom Boris Johnson.
Belgium	Brussels	4 February	Conte met President of the European Commission Ursula von der Leyen and President of the European Council Charles Michel.
Portugal	Lisbon	7 July	Giuseppe Conte met Prime Minister António Costa at the São Bento Mansion. The two leaders discussed about the socio-economic response to the COVID-19 pandemic. This trip was Conte's first one since the beginning of the pandemic.
Spain	Madrid	8 July	See also: Italy–Spain relations Conte met Prime Minister Pedro Sánchez at the Palace of Moncloa. The two leaders discussed about the socio-economic response to the COVID-19 pandemic.
Netherlands	The Hague	11 July	See also: Italy–Netherlands relations Giuseppe Conte met Prime Minister Mark Rutte. The two leaders discussed about the economic response to the COVID-19 pandemic, on which Italy and Netherlands have different positions.
Germany	Berlin	13 July	Prime Minister Conte met Chancellor Angela Merkel. The two leaders discussed about the socio-economic response to the COVID-19 pandemic.
Belgium	Brussels	17–21 July	Conte took part in the European Council to decide the EU economic response to the COVID-19 recession, which deeply affected the continent. The summit was among the longest ones in history. The European leaders agreed on a new proposal which provided a budget of €750 billion for the so-called Recovery Fund, composed of €390 billion in grants and €360 billion in loans.
Lebanon	Beirut	8 September	Prime Minister Conte met the Italian soldiers in Lebanon and had bilateral meetings with the resigning Prime Minister, Hassan Diab, and newly appointed one, Mustapha Adib.
France	Ajaccio	10 September	Conte participated in the EU Med Group summit, with the other six leaders, Emmanuel Macron, Pedro Sánchez, António Costa, Kyriakos Mitsotakis, Nicos Anastasiades and George Vella. The summit mainly concerned Turkey's unilateral activities in the Eastern Mediterranean.

== Multilateral meetings ==
Giuseppe Conte participated in the following summits during his prime ministership:

Group	Year		
Group	2018	2019	2020
UNGA	24–26 September, (United States) New York City	24 September, (United States) New York City	25 September, (videoconference) (United States) New York City
G7	8–9 June, (Canada) La Malbaie	24–26 August, (France) Biarritz	10–12 June, (cancelled) (United States) Camp David
G20	30 November – 1 December, (Argentina) Buenos Aires	28–29 June, (Japan) Osaka	21–22 November, (videoconference) (Saudi Arabia) Riyadh
NATO	11–12 July, (Belgium) Brussels	3–4 December, (United Kingdom) Watford	None
MED7		29 January, (Cyprus) Nicosia	10 September, (France) Porticcio
MED7		14 June, (Malta) Valletta	10 September, (France) Porticcio
██ = Did not attend
