= List of international prime ministerial trips made by Paolo Gentiloni =

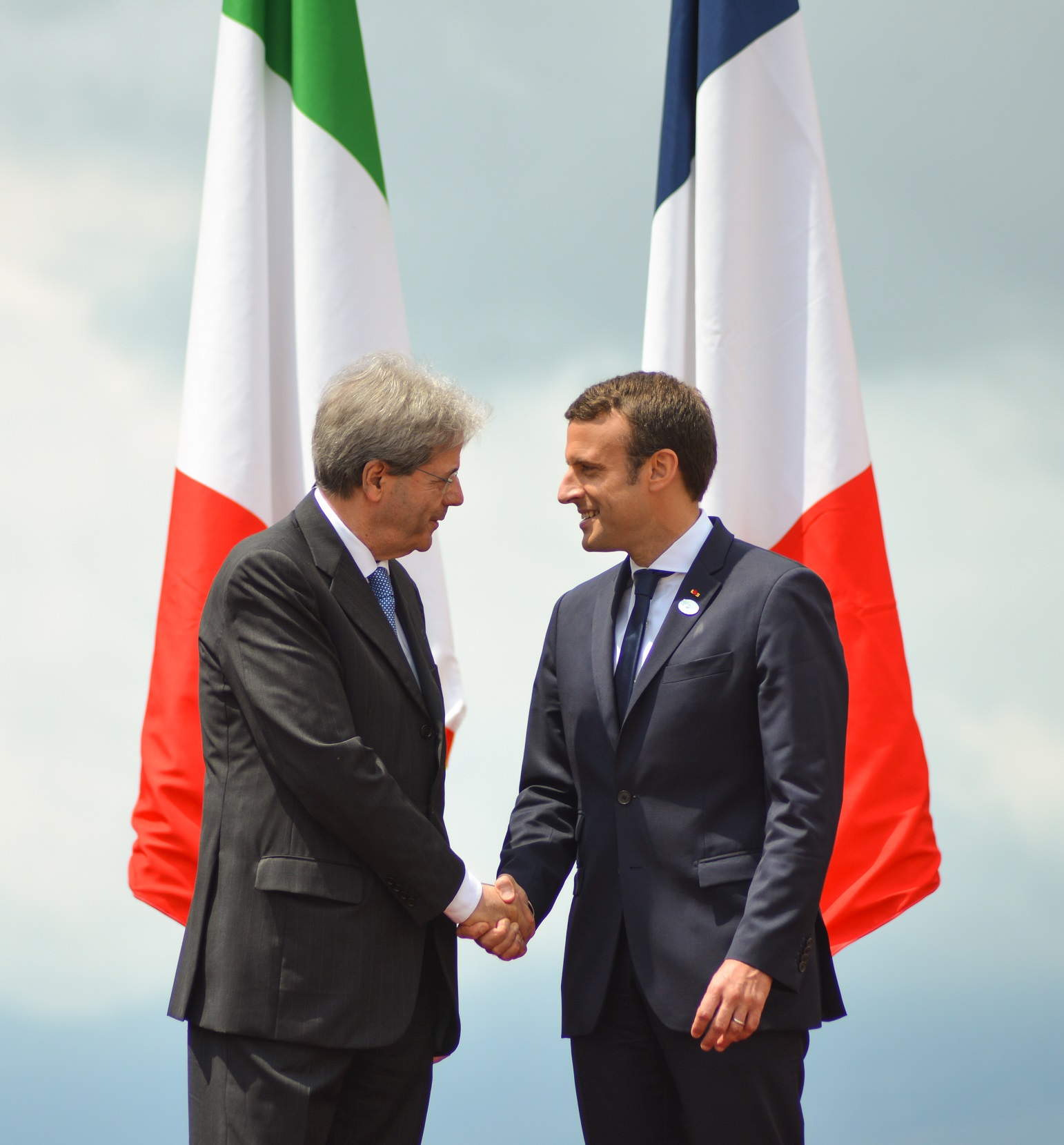
Gentiloni shaking hands with Emmanuel Macron at the 43rd G7 summit in Taormina, May 2017

This is a list of official trips made by Paolo Gentiloni, who served as the 57th Prime Minister of Italy from 12 December 2016 until 1 June 2018.

== Summary of international trips ==
Map of international trips made Paolo Gentiloni as Prime Minister: Italy 1 visit 2 visits 3 visits

Number of visits	Country
1 visit	Angola, Canada, China, Czech Republic, Estonia, Ghana, Greece, Kuwait, India, Ivory Coast, Qatar, Romania, Russia, Saudi Arabia, Slovenia, Sweden, Switzerland, Tunisia, United Kingdom
2 visits	France, Portugal, Spain, United Arab Emirates, United States
3 visits	Germany

== 2017 ==
Country	Areas visited	Date(s)	Notes
France	Paris	10 January	See also: France–Italy relations Prime Minister Gentiloni's state visit to France was his first trip outside Italy as head of the government. Gentiloni met President François Hollande. The leaders discuss about the fight against Islamic terrorism and migrant crisis.
Germany	Berlin	18 January	See also: Germany–Italy relations Paolo Gentiloni visited Germany to meet Chancellor Angela Merkel. The two leaders talked about European migrant crisis and economic growth. Gentiloni also met the Foreign Affairs Minister Frank-Walter Steinmeier.
Spain	Madrid	27 January	See also: Italy–Spain relations Prime Minister Gentiloni went to Madrid, where he met the Spanish Prime Minister Mariano Rajoy.
Portugal	Lisbon	28 January	Paolo Gentiloni went to Lisbon, where he met the Socialist Prime Minister Antonio Costa. The meeting was focused on migrant crisis and economic growth.
United Kingdom	London	9 February	See also: Italy–United Kingdom relations Gentiloni went to London, where he met Prime Minister Theresa May. The two Prime Ministers discussed about Brexit and UK withdrawal from the European Union. The Italian leader later spoke at the London School of Economics and Political Science.
Spain	Madrid	10 April	See also: Italy–Spain relations, France–Italy relations, Greece–Italy relations, and Italy–Malta relations Prime Minister Gentiloni visited Spain where he participated to the EU Med Group summit. During the event he met with Spanish Prime Minister Mariano Rajoy, French President François Hollande, Greek Prime Minister Alexis Tsipras, Portuguese Prime Minister Antonio Costa, Maltese Prime Minister Joseph Muscat and Cypriot President Nicos Anastasiades.
United States	Washington, D.C.	19–20 April	See also: Italy–United States relations Prime Minister Gentiloni visit the United States, where he met President Donald Trump at the White House. Gentiloni later spoke at the Center for Strategic and International Studies.
Canada	Ottawa	20–21 April	See also: Canada–Italy relations Gentiloni went to Canada, where he met Prime Minister Justin Trudeau. The Italian Prime Minister also met the Canadian Governor General David Johnston.
Kuwait	Kuwait City	30 April – 1 May	Gentiloni went to Kuwait, where he had bilateral meetings with the Emir Sabah al-Ahmad and the crown prince Nawaf Al-Ahmad; later the premier visited the Italian soldiers stationed in Kuwait as part of the anti-ISIL coalition.
China	Beijing	14–16 May	See also: China–Italy relations Gentiloni had an official trip to China to meet President Xi Jinping and Prime Minister Li Keqiang, to discuss about the One Belt One Road Initiative, a development strategy proposed by the Chinese government that focuses on connectivity and cooperation between Eurasian countries.
Russia	Sochi	16–17 May	See also: Italy–Russia relations Paolo Gentiloni went to Sochi, where he met Russian President Vladimir Putin. The leaders stressed their hope for a loosening of international sanctions against Russia and for a re-opening of a dialogue between Russia and NATO. They also signed six economic deals regarding Eni and Rosneft.
Germany	Berlin	28 August	See also: Germany–Italy relations, France–Italy relations, and Italy–Spain relations Prime Minister Gentiloni went to Berlin for a meeting with German Chancellor Angela Merkel, French President Emmanuel Macron and Spanish Prime Minister Mariano Rajoy. The main focus of their meeting was the migrant crisis.
Slovenia	Ljubljana	7 September	See also: Italy–Slovenia relations Gentiloni met Prime Minister Miro Cerar. The focus of the meeting was the repatriation of immigrants.
Czech Republic	Prague	7 September	Paolo Gentiloni went to Prague, where he met Czech Prime Minister Bohuslav Sobotka to discuss about the immigration to Europe.
Greece	Corfu	14 September	See also: Greece–Italy relations Prime Minister Gentiloni visited the island of Corfu where he met Greek Prime Minister Alexis Tsipras. The two leaders signed many economic deals regarding infrastructures and transports, in particular the Italian State Railways bought Greek TrainOSE.
United States	New York City	19–20 September	See also: Italy–United States relations On 19 September Gentiloni spoke at the New York University. While on following day, he participated to the United Nations summit in New York City, focusing his speech on the problem of climatic change, migrant crisis and fight against terrorism. In NYC Gentiloni had also bilateral meetings with UK Prime Minister Theresa May, King Abdullah II of Jordan and Libyan Prime Minister Fayez al-Sarraj.
Estonia	Tallinn	29 September	Prime Minister Gentiloni went to Tallinn to participate with the other European leaders to the 2017 Digital Summit.
India	New Delhi	29–30 October	See also: India–Italy relations Gentiloni went to India, where he met Prime Minister Narendra Modi. The two leaders signed some economic treaties and discussed the recognition of the Hare Krishnas, who still are not recognized in Italy as a religious minority.
Saudi Arabia	Riyadh	30–31 October	Prime Minister Gentiloni met in Riyadh, King Salman bin Abdulaziz Al Saud and the crown prince Mohammed bin Salman.
United Arab Emirates	Abu Dhabi	31 October	Paolo Gentiloni visited the United Arab Emirates, where he met in Abu Dhabi the crown prince Mohammed bin Zayed Al Nahyan and Dubai Ruler Mohammed bin Rashid Al Maktoum.
Qatar	Doha	31 October – 1 November	Gentiloni went to Doha, in Qatar, where he met with the Emir Tamim bin Hamad Al Thani and visited the National Library of Qatar with Emir's consort, Moza bint Nasser.
Sweden	Gothenburg	17 November	Paolo Gentiloni went to Sweden to participate with the other European leaders to the 2017 Social Summit.
Tunisia	Tunis	24–26 November	See also: Italy–Tunisia relations Paolo Gentiloni visited Tunisia, where he met President Beji Caid Essebsi and Prime Minister Youssef Chahed; the discussions were focused on migrant crisis and Libyan civil war. He also had a meeting with the Italian community.
Angola	Luanda	26–27 November	Prime Minister Gentiloni went to Angola to meet President João Lourenço. The two leaders signed many economic deals between Eni and the Angolan Sonangol Group. On 27 November Gentiloni paid tribute to Agostinho Neto's memorial.
Ghana	Accra	27–28 November	Paolo Gentiloni visited Ghana, where he met Nana Akufo-Addo. On 28 November the Prime Minister visited Eni's plant "John Agyekum Kufuor".
Ivory Coast	Abidjan	28–29 November	Gentiloni went to Ivory Coast to participate at the EU–African Union summit. During the event he had bilateral meetings with many African leaders.
Portugal	Lisbon	1 December	Prime Minister Gentiloni went to Lisbon, where he had a multilateral meeting with Prime Minister Antonio Costa and the other leaders of the Party of European Socialists. The meeting was focused on Brexit.
France	Paris	13 December	See also: France–Italy relations Gentiloni went to Paris to meet French President Emmanuel Macron. The two leaders discussed about fight against Islamic terrorism, the Libyan Civil War and migrant crisis.

== 2018 ==
Country	Areas visited	Date(s)	Notes
Switzerland	Davos	23–24 January	See also: Italy–Switzerland relations Prime Minister Gentiloni participated to the World Economic Forum in Davos.
Germany	Berlin	16 February	See also: Germany–Italy relations Paolo Gentiloni went to Germany to meet Chancellor Angela Merkel. The two leaders discussed, among other things, about the March 2018 election in Italy.
United Arab Emirates	Abu Dhabi	11 March	Paolo Gentiloni visited the United Arab Emirates, where he met in Abu Dhabi the crown prince Mohammed bin Zayed Al Nahyan. During his visit he participated in the signing ceremony of a commercial agreements between Eni and Abu Dhabi National Oil Company.
Romania	Bucharest	19 April	See also: Italy–Romania relations Prime Minister Gentiloni visited Romania, where he met Prime Minister Viorica Dancila and President Klaus Iohannis.

== Multilateral meetings ==
Paolo Gentiloni participated in the following summits during his prime ministership:

Group	Year	
Group	2017	2018
UNGA	September 19–20, (United States) New York City	
G7	26–27 May, (Italy) Taormina	
G20	7–8 July, (Germany) Hamburg	
NATO	25 May, (Belgium) Brussels	
MED7	28 January, (Portugal) Lisbon	10 January, (Italy) Rome
MED7	10 April, (Spain) Madrid	10 January, (Italy) Rome
