= List of international prime ministerial trips made by Mario Draghi =

This is a list of international prime ministerial trips made by Mario Draghi, who served as prime minister of Italy from 13 February 2021 to 22 October 2022.

== Summary ==
Countries by number of visits:

- One visit to Algeria, the Czech Republic, Israel, Libya, Palestine, Portugal, Slovenia, Turkey and Ukraine
- Two visits to Germany, Spain, the United Kingdom and the United States
- Five visits to France
- Six visits to Belgium

== 2021 ==
Country	Location(s)	Dates	Details	Image
Libya	Tripoli	6 April	Prime Minister Draghi's state visit to Libya was his first trip outside Italy as head of the government, and the first trip outside Europe as well. Draghi visited Libya, where he met Prime Minister Abdul Hamid Dbeibeh, seeking to strengthen ties with the African country. The trip was described as an attempt to reduce the Turkish and Egyptian influences over Libya, following the aftermath of the civil war.	
Portugal	Porto	7–8 May	Draghi travelled to Porto to attend the EU Social Summit with the other heads of state or government of the European Union. The next day he attended an informal summit between other heads of state or government of the European Union.	
France	Paris	18 May	Draghi travelled to Paris to attend the Summit on Financing African Economies at the Grand Palais Éphémère with the other heads of state or government leaders of thirty African countries.	
Belgium	Brussels	24–25 May	Draghi travelled to Brussels to attend the Special meeting of the European Council.	
United Kingdom	Carbis Bay	11–13 June	Draghi travelled to Carbis Bay to attend the 47th G7 summit. He met the President of the United States Joe Biden, the Canadian Prime Minister Justin Trudeau, the British Prime Minister Boris Johnson.	
Belgium	Brussels	14 June	Draghi travelled to Brussels to attend the 2021 NATO summit.	
Spain	Barcelona	18 June	Draghi travelled to Barcelona to attend the Cercle d’Economia. He was awarded the ‘Prize for European Construction’. He met the Spanish Prime Minister Pedro Sánchez.	
Germany	Berlin	21 June	Draghi met with Chancellor Angela Merkel to discuss the European migrant crisis, in preparation for the European Council.	
France	Marseille	2 September	Draghi travelled to Marseille to meet the French President Emmanuel Macron.	
United States	New York City	23 September	Draghi travelled to New York to attend General debate of the seventy-sixth session of the United Nations General Assembly.	
Slovenia	Brdo, Ljubljana	5–6 October	Draghi attended an informal European Council and the EU-Western Balkans summit.	
United Kingdom	Glasgow	1–12 November	Invited by Prime Minister Boris Johnson to attend as co-host of COP26, Draghi travelled to Glasgow to attend the 2021 United Nations Climate Change Conference. He met the Israeli Prime Minister Naftali Bennett.	
France	Paris	12 November	Draghi attended an international conference on Libya. He met the French President, Emmanuel Macron, and the Prime Minister of the Government of National Unity of Libya, Abdul Hamid Dbeibeh.	

== 2022 ==
Country	Location(s)	Dates	Details	Image
France	Paris	16 February	Draghi travelled to Paris and he attended the ‘Consultations and commitment prospects for the Sahel’ working dinner. He met the French President, Emmanuel Macron, to review the military presence in Mali.	
Belgium	Brussels	24 February	Draghi travelled to Brussels to attend the Special meeting of the European Council about the 2022 Russian invasion of Ukraine.	
Belgium	Brussels	7 March	Draghi travelled to Brussels to meet the President of the European Commission Ursula von der Leyen. They discussed about the 2022 Russian invasion of Ukraine and sanctions towards Russia.	
France	Versailles	10–11 March	Draghi travelled to Versailles to attend an informal Meeting of EU Heads of State and Government to discuss about the 2022 Russian invasion of Ukraine and the reduction of the dependency towards Russia.	
Belgium	Brussels	24 March	Draghi travelled to Brussels to attend the extraordinary NATO summit to discuss the Russian invasion of Ukraine.	
Algeria	Algiers	11 April	Draghi travelled to Algiers to meet Algerian president	
United States	Washington D.C.	10–11 May	Draghi travelled to Washington D.C. for talks with U.S. President Joe Biden about the 2022 Russian invasion of Ukraine and sanctions towards Russia. In the two days in Washington he made a stop on Capitol Hill for a bipartisan meeting with the leadership of Congress and speaker of the House Nancy Pelosi. Draghi was at the Atlantic Council to receive the Distinguished Leadership Award, awarded by the US Secretary of the Treasury, Janet Yellen.	
Israel	Jerusalem	13–14 June	Draghi met with the President of Israel Isaac Herzog, the Israeli Prime Minister Naftali Bennett and Alternate Prime Minister Yair Lapid. Also visited Yad Vashem.	
Palestinian Authority	Ramallah	13–14 June	Draghi met with Palestinian prime minister Mohammad Shtayyeh.	
Ukraine	Kyiv, Irpin	16 June	Draghi met with President Volodymyr Zelenskyy along with German Chancellor Olaf Scholz, French President Emmanuel Macron and Romanian President Klaus Iohannis for the first time since the beginning of the Russian invasion of Ukraine. He travelled to Kyiv by train from Rzeszów for safety reasons.	
Belgium	Brussels	23–24 June	Macron attended in Brussels an EU-Western Balkans Leaders meeting, a European Council and a Euro summit.	
Germany	Schloss Elmau	26–28 June	Draghi attended the 48th G7 summit. Met with German Chancellor Olaf Scholz.	
Spain	Madrid	28–30 June	Draghi travelled to Madrid to attend the 32nd NATO Summit at IFEMA.	
Turkey	Ankara	5 July	Draghi traveled to Ankara to discuss the Ukraine War and EU-Turkey relations with President Recep Tayyip Erdoğan.	
United States	New York City	20 September	Draghi travelled to New York to attend General debate of the seventy-seventh session of the United Nations General Assembly.	
Czech Republic	Prague	6 October	Draghi travelled to Prague to attend the inaugural meeting of the European Political Community.	

== Multilateral meetings ==
Mario Draghi participated in the following summits during his prime ministership:

Group	Year	
Group	2021	2022
UN GA	23 September, (United States) New York City	20 September, (United States) New York City
G7	11–13 June, (United Kingdom) Carbis Bay	26–28 June, (Germany) Schloss Elmau
G-20	30–31 October, (Italy) Rome	
NATO	14 June, (Belgium) Brussels	24 March, (Belgium) Brussels
NATO	14 June, (Belgium) Brussels	28–30 June, (Spain) Madrid
EU summit	25–26 February (videoconference), 25–26 March (videoconference), 24–25 June, 21–22 October, 16–17 December, (Belgium) Brussels	24–25 March, 23–24 June, (Belgium) Brussels
Euro summit	25 March, 16 December, (Belgium) Brussels	24 June, (Belgium) Brussels
EaP summit	15 December, (Belgium) Brussels	TBD
MED9 summit	17 September, (Greece) Athens	
UNCCC	1–12 November, (United Kingdom) Glasgow	
ASEM	21–22 November, (Cambodia) Phnom Penh (videoconference)^{[a]}	TBD
Others	2020 Summer Olympics opening ceremony, (Japan) Tokyo	2022 Winter Olympics opening ceremony, (China) Beijing
██ = Hosted by Italy ██ = Future event ██ = Did not attend^aForeign Minister Luigi Di Maio attended in the Prime Minister's place.

== See also ==
- Foreign relations of Italy
