= List of international prime ministerial trips made by Giorgia Meloni =

This is a list of international prime ministerial trips made by Giorgia Meloni, who is serving as the 60th and current Prime Minister of Italy since 22 October 2022.

== Summary ==
Travel of Giorgia Meloni as the prime minister of Italy: Italy 1 visit 2 visits 3 visits 4 visits 5-9 visits 10 or More visits

Countries by number of visits:

- One visit to Angola, Argentina, Armenia, Austria, Brazil, China, Denmark, Finland, Iceland, Indonesia, Iraq, Ireland, Israel, Jordan, Kazakhstan, Kuwait, Latvia, Malta, Moldova, Mozambique, Netherlands, Norway, Oman, Republic of the Congo, South Africa, South Korea, Spain, Sweden, and Switzerland
- Two visits to Algeria, Azerbaijan, Bahrain, Canada, Croatia, Cyprus, Czech Republic, Greece, Hungary, India, Lebanon, Lithuania, Poland, Saudi Arabia, Serbia, and Ukraine
- Three visits to Albania, Ethiopia, Japan, Qatar, Turkey, and Uzbekistan
- Four visits to Egypt, Libya, United Arab Emirates, and the United Kingdom
- Five visits to Germany, Tunisia, and Vatican City
- Ten visits to France and the United States
- Twenty-Five visits to Belgium

== 2022 ==
Country	Location(s)	Dates	Details	Image
Belgium	Brussels	3 November	Prime Minister Meloni met with the President of the European Parliament Roberta Metsola, the President of the European Commission Ursula von der Leyen and the President of the European Council Charles Michel for her first international trip as head of government.	
Egypt	Sharm El Sheikh	6–7 November	Prime Minister Meloni attended the 2022 United Nations Climate Change Conference (COP27). She held separate bilateral meetings with other heads of government, including British prime minister Rishi Sunak.	
Indonesia	Bali	15–16 November	Prime Minister Meloni attended at the 2022 G20 Summit. She held separate bilateral meetings with Chinese president Xi Jinping and US president Joe Biden.	
Albania	Tirana	6 December	Prime Minister Meloni attended at the 2022 EU-Western Balkans summit. She held a separate bilateral meeting with Albanian prime minister Edi Rama.	
Belgium	Brussels	15 December	Prime Minister Meloni attended the European Council.	
Iraq	Baghdad	23 December	Prime Minister Meloni met Prime Minister Mohammed Shia' Al Sudani, Head of State Abdul Latif Rashid and Speaker of the Council of Representatives of Iraq Mohamed al-Halbousi.	
(Kurdistan Region) Iraqi Kurdistan	Erbil	23 December	In Erbil, Prime Minister Meloni met the president of Iraqi Kurdistan Nechervan Barzani and Prime Minister Masrour Barzani. Later she visited the Italian troops at the Camp Singara base in the Nineveh Governorate where most anti-Daesh Italian soldiers are based.	

== 2023 ==
Country	Location(s)	Dates	Details	Image
Vatican City		5 January	Prime Minister Meloni attended the funeral of Pope emeritus Benedict XVI in St. Peter's Square.	
Vatican City		10 January	Prime Minister Meloni met with Pope Francis during her first official visit to Vatican City. The two held private talks inside the Apostolic Palace, where they discussed about Russo-Ukrainian War, immigration, Europe and education.	
Algeria	Algiers	22–23 January	In her first visit to the African continent, Prime Minister Meloni met President Abdelmadjid Tebboune to improve relations between Italy and Algeria in political, cultural and energy fields. They discussed the increasing of gas supplies to Italy through the Trans-Mediterranean Pipeline to eliminate imports from Russia by 2024, following the 2022 Russian invasion of Ukraine. They later signed bilateral agreements in the presence of managing directors of Eni, Claudio Descalzi and Sonatrach, Toufik Hakkar. On 23 January, she met with Prime Minister Aymen Benabderrahmane and laid a wreath at the Martyrs' Memorial, before visiting the garden dedicated to Enrico Mattei and greeting the crew of Italian Navy ship Carabiniere, docked in the port of Algiers.	
Libya	Tripoli	28–29 January	Prime Minister Meloni met the Chairman of the Presidential Council Mohamed al-Menfi and Prime Minister Abdul Hamid Dbeibeh, and signed bilateral agreements regarding cooperation, energy and migration flows.	
Sweden	Stockholm	3 February	Prime Minister Meloni met with Prime Minister of Sweden Ulf Kristersson in Stockholm to discuss EU issues, including migration and economic policy.	
Germany	Berlin	3 February	Prime Minister Meloni met with German chancellor Olaf Scholz in Berlin, in order to discuss the European Union state aid rules changes.	
Belgium	Brussels	9 February	Prime Minister Meloni attended a one-day special European Council focused on Ukraine, economy, migration, Belgrade-Pristina negotiations, and the 2023 Turkey-Syria earthquake emergency response.	
Poland	Warsaw, Rzeszów, Przemyśl	20–21 February	Prime Minister Meloni met with President of Poland Andrzej Duda and Prime Minister of Poland Mateusz Morawiecki. Later she flew to Rzeszów, then transferred to Przemyśl and via train went to Kyiv in Ukraine.	
Ukraine	Bucha, Irpin, Kyiv	21 February	In Kyiv, Prime Minister Meloni met with President of Ukraine Volodymyr Zelenskyy at Mariinskyi Palace. She also visited Bucha and Irpin.	
India	Delhi	2 March	Prime Minister Meloni met with Prime Minister Narendra Modi and President Droupadi Murmu. Later, she attend the inaugural session of Raisina Dialogue.	
United Arab Emirates	Abu Dhabi	3–4 March	Prime Minister Meloni travels to Abu Dhabi to discuss rebuilding and broadening relations between the two countries after the diplomatic rift following the revocation of arms export permits to the United Arab Emirates in 2021. She met with Ministry of Industry and Advanced Technology and President-Designate of COP28 Sultan Al Jaber and President of the United Arab Emirates Mohamed bin Zayed Al Nahyan	
Belgium	Brussels	23–24 March	Prime Minister Meloni attended the European Council focused on EU support to Ukraine, competitiveness, single market, economy, energy and migration. She held separate bilateral meetings with French president Emmanuel Macron, Greek prime minister Kyriakos Mitsotakis and Portuguese prime minister Antonio Costa.	
Ethiopia	Addis Ababa	14–15 April	In the first trip by a Western head of government since the end of the Tigray War, Prime Minister Meloni attended a trilateral meeting with Prime Minister Abiy Ahmed Ali and Somali President Hassan Sheikh Mohamud. She also met with Chairperson of the African Union Commission Moussa Faki Mahamat.	
United Kingdom	London	27–28 April	In her first visit to the United Kingdom, Prime Minister Meloni met with Prime Minister Rishi Sunak to sign a Memorandum of Understanding on Bilateral Cooperation. Later, they paid a visit to Westminster Abbey while preparations were underway for the coronation of King Charles III. The following day, Prime Minister Meloni met with Foreign Secretary James Cleverly and Secretary of State for Business and Trade Kemi Badenoch, before delivering a speech at the Policy Exchange think tank after being awarded the Grotius Prize.	
Czech Republic	Prague	10 May	Prime Minister Meloni met with Czech Prime Minister Petr Fiala and President Petr Pavel.	
Iceland	Reykjavík	16 May	Prime Minister Meloni attended the 4th Summit of Heads of State and Government of the Council of Europe in Reykjavík.	
Japan	Hiroshima, Miyajima	18–20 May	Prime Minister Meloni headed to Hiroshima to meet with Japanese Prime Minister Fumio Kishida to improve bilateral relations between Italy and Japan and discuss the work program of the forthcoming Italian presidency of G7. She later attended the 49th G7 summit and held bilateral meetings with other heads of government, including Canadian Prime Minister Justin Trudeau, German Chancellor Olaf Scholz and British Prime Minister Rishi Sunak. She returned to Italy a day early to address the flood emergency in Emilia-Romagna region.	
Moldova	Chișinău, Bulboaca	1 June	Prime Minister Meloni attended the 2nd European Political Community Summit at Mimi Castle. She later held a separate trilateral meeting with President of the European Commission Ursula von der Leyen and Dutch Prime Minister Mark Rutte to discuss the migration flows issues and the Tunisian economic and political crisis.	
Tunisia	Tunis	6 June	Prime Minister Meloni met with Prime Minister Najla Bouden and President Kais Saied to discuss the response to the Tunisian severe financial crisis.	
Tunisia	Tunis	11 June	Prime Minister Meloni travelled to Tunis for the second time in a week along with President of European Commission Ursula von der Leyen and Dutch prime minister Mark Rutte in order to meet with President Kais Saied to discuss the terms of the agreement for the disbursement of International Monetary Fund bailout loans and migratory flows issues.	
France	Paris	20 June	Prime Minister Meloni visited the Bureau International des Expositions for the presentation of Rome bid for the Expo 2030. She was accompanied by the Mayor of Rome Roberto Gualtieri and astronaut Samantha Cristoforetti. Later she met with French president Emmanuel Macron.	
Austria	Krems an der Donau	24 June	Prime Minister Meloni attended the Europa-Forum Wachau at Göttweig Abbey. Prior to the summit, she met with Austrian Chancellor Karl Nehammer.	
Belgium	Brussels	29–30 June	Prime Minister Meloni attended the European Council, focused on military and financial support for Ukraine, migration, EU relationship with China and economic policy.	
Poland	Warsaw	5 July	Prime Minister Meloni met with Polish prime minister Mateusz Morawiecki in Warsaw.	
Latvia	Riga, Ādaži	10 July	Prime Minister Meloni met with Latvian prime minister Krišjānis Kariņš. Then she visited Italian troops at Camp Adazi Military Base.	
Lithuania	Vilnius	11–12 July	Prime Minister Meloni attended the 2023 NATO summit, her first summit as Prime Minister. She held separate bilateral meetings with other head of government, including Turkish president Recep Tayyip Erdoğan.	
Tunisia	Tunis	16 July	Prime Minister Meloni, along with President of the European Commission Ursula von der Leyen and Dutch Prime Minister Mark Rutte, travelled to Tunis in order to sign an agreement with President Kais Saied regarding the strengthening of the economic partnership between Europe and Tunisia, the European diplomatic support for the disbursement of the loan from International Monetary Fund and the fight against irregular migration flows.	
Belgium	Brussels	17–18 July	Prime Minister Meloni attended the EU-CELAC summit. She also held a bilateral meeting with Secretary General of NATO Jens Stoltenberg.	
United States	Washington, D.C., Arlington	27–28 July	On 27 July, Prime Minister Meloni visited the U.S. Capitol where she met with Speaker of the House Kevin McCarthy and Senate Majority Leader Chuck Schumer and Minority Leader Mitch McConnell. Later she met with U.S. President Joe Biden at the White House, where they discussed about many issues, including Ukraine, China and Africa. They also talked about the strengthening of economic exchange between the two countries, trade relations between Europe and U.S., security policies and the forthcoming G7 Italian presidency. The following day Meloni laid a wreath at the Tomb of the Unknown Soldier at Arlington National Cemetery, accompanied by the Italian ambassador to the United States Mariangela Zappia. At the end of her trip, she met with former US Secretary of State and Nobel Peace Prize recipient Henry Kissinger.	
Greece	Athens	31 August	Prime Minister Meloni met with Greek prime minister Kyriakos Mitsotakis.	
India	New Delhi	8–10 September	Prime Minister Meloni attended the 2023 G20 summit. She also met with Chinese Premier Li Qiang.	
Qatar	Doha	10–11 September	Prime Minister Meloni met with Emir Tamim bin Hamad Al Thani in Doha to discuss the development of bilateral relations between Italy and Qatar, in particular in economic, energy, investment and defense sectors.	
Hungary	Budapest	14 September	Prime Minister Meloni met with President Katalin Novák and Prime Minister Viktor Orbán. Later she delivered a speech at Budapest Demographic Summit.	
United States	New York City	18–21 September	Prime Minister Meloni attended the seventy-eighth session of the United Nations General Assembly, where she delivered a speech focused on global migration crisis and on development and cooperation with African countries. She also met with several world leaders.	
Malta	Valletta	29 September	Prime Minister Meloni attended the EU Med9 summit, which discussed migrations issues, Ukraine and EU enlargement policies. She was joined by European Commission President Ursula von der Leyen, French President Emmanuel Macron, Maltese Prime Minister Robert Abela, Greek Prime Minister Kyriakos Mitsotakis, Slovenian Prime Minister Robert Golob, Croatian Prime Minister Andrej Plenković, Portuguese Prime Minister António Costa, Cypriot President Nikos Christodoulides and Spanish Prime Minister Pedro Sánchez.	
Spain	Granada	5–6 October	Prime Minister Meloni attended the 3rd European Political Community Summit in Granada. Talks were held with British Prime Minister Rishi Sunak and German Chancellor Olaf Scholz on migration issues.	
Mozambique	Maputo	13 October	Prime Minister Meloni went on a one-day trip to Africa "to build a new approach in relations between Europe and African countries". In Maputo, she met with President Filipe Nyusi to discuss economic, energy and development cooperation. She also met with peacekeepers and soldiers of the Italian Navy Luigi Durand de la Penne destroyer.	
Republic of the Congo	Brazzaville	13 October	Prime Minister Meloni met with President Denis Sassou Nguesso and Prime Minister Anatole Collinet Makosso to discuss energy cooperation and local communities development.	
Egypt	Cairo	21 October	Prime Minister Meloni attended a peace summit in Cairo dedicated to the Gaza war. On the sidelines of the summit, she met with Egyptian president Abdel Fattah al-Sisi to discuss the serious crisis in Middle East and the need to support diplomatic action to curb further expansion. She also held talks with President of the Palestinian National Authority Mahmoud Abbas to reiterate Italy support for the prospect of two-State solution for Israel and Palestine.	
Israel	Tel Aviv	21 October	After the summit in Cairo, Prime Minister Meloni paid a three-hour visit to Tel Aviv to meet with Prime Minister Benjamin Netanyahu. She shared Italy's support to Israel following the October 7 attacks and discussed the humanitarian crisis in the Gaza Strip.	
Belgium	Brussels	26–27 October	Prime Minister Meloni attended the European Council, focused on Middle East, Ukraine, economic growth and external relations.	
United Kingdom	Milton Keynes	2 November	Prime Minister Meloni attended the 2023 AI Safety Summit in Bletchley Park, Milton Keynes. She held a separate bilateral meeting with British Prime Minister Rishi Sunak.	
Croatia	Zagreb	16–17 November	Prime Minister Meloni attended an informal summit in Zagreb with Croatian Prime Minister Andrej Plenković, Polish Prime Minister of Poland Mateusz Morawiecki, Maltese Prime Minister Robert Abela and President of the European Council Charles Michel to discuss measures of the EU strategic agenda, including enlargement policies to Western Balkans countries.	
Germany	Berlin	22 November	Prime Minister Meloni participated at the Italy-Germany Summit in Berlin alongside German Chancellor Olaf Scholz.	
United Arab Emirates	Dubai	1–2 December	Prime Minister Meloni attended the 2023 United Nations Climate Change Conference.	
Serbia	Belgrade	3 December	Prime Minister Meloni met with President Aleksandar Vučić.	
Belgium	Brussels	13–15 December	Prime Minister Meloni attended the EU-Western Balkans summit. On 14 and 15 December she attended the European Council focused on the Middle East, enlargements policies for Ukraine, Moldova, Georgia and Bosnia-Herzegovina and EU mid-term budget review.	

== 2024 ==
Country	Location(s)	Dates	Details	Image
Turkey	Istanbul	20 January	Prime Minister Meloni made her first official trip of the year to meet with Turkish president Recep Tayyip Erdogan in Istanbul to discuss relations between the two countries, EU-Turkey relations, Middle East, Ukraine and regional and security issues.	
Belgium	Brussels	1 February	Prime Minister Meloni attended an extraordinary European Council to discuss the EU long-term budget review and Ukraine.	
Japan	Tokyo	4–6 February	Prime Minister Meloni met with Prime Minister Fumio Kishida to discuss global issues such as the conflicts in Ukraine and Middle East, nuclear disarmament, artificial intelligence as well as boostering cooperation in security and defense, including the joint Global Combat Air Programme fighter jet development and Italy's increasing presence in the Indo-Pacific region. She also met with CEOs of large Japanese group with interests in Italy like Mitsubishi, Hitachi and Marubeni.	
Ukraine	Kyiv, Hostomel	24 February	Prime Minister Meloni travelled to Ukraine on the second anniversary of Russia’s aggression, along with European Commission President Ursula von der Leyen, Belgian prime minister Alexander De Croo and Canadian prime minister Justin Trudeau, where she attended an honours ceremony for those who defended the Hostomel Airport. Later, after visiting the Memory Wall of Fallen Defenders, Prime Minister Meloni had a bilateral meeting with Ukrainian president Volodymyr Zelenskyy, after which a security cooperation agreement was signed. In the afternoon, Prime Minister Meloni chaired a video-conference meeting of the G7 Heads of State and Government from the Saint Sophia Cathedral, during which Ukrainian president Volodymyr Zelensky also spoke.	
United States	Washington, D.C.	1 March	Prime Minister Meloni met with President Joe Biden at the White House. Their meeting focused on continued support for Ukraine and the Gaza war, with Meloni reiterating Italy's call for an "immediate ceasefire" in Gaza to ensure humanitarian aids. They also discussed issues such as the G7 Italian presidency, North Africa and cooperation on China.	
Canada	Toronto	2 March	Prime Minister Meloni met with Canadian prime minister Justin Trudeau to improve relations between Canada and Italy. The two leaders agreeds on deepening the two countries' bilateral relations that would increase political, economic and strategic ties such as cooperation on sustainable energy transition, climate change issues, biodiversity and research and innovation, including artificial intelligence.	
Egypt	Cairo	17 March	Prime Minister Meloni, along with President of the European Commission Ursula von der Leyen, Austrian prime minister Karl Nehammer, Belgian prime minister Alexander De Croo, Greek prime minister Kyriakos Mitsotakis and Cypriot President Nikos Christodoulides, travelled to Cairo in order to meet with President Abdel Fattah al-Sisi to advance negotiations on signing agreements regarding the strengthening of strategic and economic ties between European Union and Egypt such as investment and trade, migration issues, security and renewable energy cooperation.	
Belgium	Brussels	21–22 March	Prime Minister Meloni attended the European Council, focused on Ukraine, security and defence issues, Middle East, enlargement policies and agriculture.	
Lebanon	Beirut, Chamaa	27–28 March	Prime Minister Meloni visited the Italian troops committed to UNIFIL peacekeeping mission and met with Lebanese prime minister Najib Mikati.	
Tunisia	Tunis	17 April	Prime Minister Meloni paid a three-hour visit to Tunis to meet with President Kais Saied at Carthage Palace. They discussed about financial support for Tunisian State budget and cooperation on renewable energy projects and migrations issues.	
Belgium	Brussels	17–18 April	After a brief visit to Tunis, Prime Minister Meloni headed to Brussels in order to attend an extraordinary European Council. EU-Turkey relations, developments in the Middle East, Ukraine and a new European competitiveness deal were discussed at the summit.	
Libya	Tripoli, Benghazi	7 May	Prime Minister Meloni met with President of the Libyan Presidential Council Mohamed al-Menfi and Prime Minister of the Libyan Government of National Unity Abdul Hamid Dbeibeh in Tripoli to discuss the strengthening of political and economic relations between the two countries and the creation of egalitarian partnerships for projects aimed at the development of local communities regarding health, sport, education and ecological transition, with the aim of creating the conditions necessary to help local communities thrive and fight human traffickers. To engage with all the Libyan stakeholders, in the afternoon Meloni also visited Benghazi to meet with Field Marshal Khalifa Haftar to reiterate Italy's commitment to Libya's stability, including support for UN-mediated efforts towards consensus on upcoming presidential and parliamentary elections.	
Albania	Gjadër, Shëngjin	5 June	Prime Minister Meloni visited the Gjadër Aerodrome, where construction work for one of the two migrant processing centers that the Italian and Albanian governments agreed to build has started. Afterwards she visited Shengjin harbor where a migrant reception center has been recently built and is now ready to host immigrants.	
Switzerland	Nidwalden	16 June	Prime Minister Meloni attended the Ukraine peace summit at the Bürgenstock Resort.	
Belgium	Brussels	17 June	Prime Minister Meloni attended an informal European summit with European Union leaders to prepare the designation of the new European Commission President after the 2024 European Parliament election.	
Belgium	Brussels	27–28 June	Prime Minister Meloni attended the European Council, which appointed António Costa as European Council President and Kaja Kallas as High Representative of the European Union for Foreign Affairs and Security Policy. Ursula von der Leyen was appointed for a second term as President of the European Commission.	
United States	Washington, D.C.	9–11 July	Prime Minister Meloni attended the 2024 NATO Washington summit.	
Libya	Tripoli	17 July	Prime Minister Meloni attended the Trans-Mediterranean Migration Forum and met with Prime Minister Abdul Hamid Dbeibah.	
United Kingdom	Woodstock	18 July	Prime Minister Meloni attended the 4th European Political Community Summit.	
China	Beijing, Shanghai	28–31 July	Prime Minister Meloni met with Premier Li Qiang and addressed a business forum. She also met with President Xi Jinping and inaugurated an exhibition for the 700th anniversary of Marco Polo's death at the Beijing World Art Museum. In Shanghai, she met with Chinese Communist Party Committee Secretary of Shanghai Chen Jining and with the Italian business community.	
Uzbekistan	Tashkent	31 July	On her flight back from China, Prime Minister Meloni made a short stop to Tashkent, where she met with Uzbek foreign minister Bakhtiyor Saidov on behalf of President Shavkat Mirziyoyev at Tashkent International Airport to discuss strengthening of bilateral cooperation.	
France	Paris, Versailles	1–2 August	Prime Minister Meloni attended events held at the 2024 Summer Olympics, and visited Italian Olympic team. She also met with IOC president Thomas Bach and President Emmanuel Macron at Palace of Versailles, where the two discussed main issues in European and international politics such as Venezuela and Middle East.	
France	Paris	7 September	In Paris, Prime Minister Meloni attended events held at the 2024 Summer Paralympics, and visited the Italian Paralympic team.	
United States	New York City	22–24 September	Prime Minister Giorgia Meloni attended the 79th session of the United Nations General Assembly.	
Cyprus	Paphos	11 October	Prime Minister Meloni attended the 11th EU Med summit.	
Belgium	Brussels	16–17 October	Prime Minister Meloni attended the first EU-Gulf Cooperation Council summit. The following day, she held an informal meeting together with Danish prime minister Mette Frederiksen and Dutch prime minister Dick Schoof and other European heads of government to discuss migration issues. Later, she attended the European Council focused on Ukraine, Middle East, competitiveness, migrations and external relations.	
Jordan	Aqaba	18 October	Prime Minister Meloni met with King Abdullah II in Aqaba to discuss regional issues, including the joint efforts towards a ceasefire in the Gaza Strip and the release of Israeli hostages, as well as the need for a political process leading to a two-state solution and Syrian refugees crisis.	
Lebanon	Beirut	18 October	Prime Minister Meloni visited Beirut and met with Prime Minister Najib Mikati and Parliament Speaker Nabih Berri in order to discuss the efforts to reach a ceasefire in both Lebanon and Gaza as well as to reiterate her support to UNIFIL peacekeepers after Israeli troops attacks; she was the first leader to visit the crisis-hit country after Israeli offensive.	
Libya	Tripoli	29 October	Prime Minister Meloni attended the Italian-Libyan Economic Forum and met with Prime Minister Abdul Hamid Dbeibeh to discuss the strengthening of friendship and strategic partnership between Libya and Italy. The two leaders agreed to strengthen cooperation on cultural and economic development projects, such as Italian support for the construction of the Musaid-Ras Ajdir coastal road and the return of ITA Airways flights to Libya.	
Hungary	Budapest	7–8 November	Prime Minister Meloni attended the 5th European Political Community Summit, where she met with several European leaders, including Prime Minister of Norway Jonas Gahr Støre and newly re-elected Moldovan President Maia Sandu; the next day, she attended an informal European Council meeting, focused on growth and competitiveness and the EU-US relations following the re-election of Donald Trump.	
Azerbaijan	Baku	13 November	Prime Minister Meloni attended the 2024 United Nations Climate Change Conference.	
Brazil	Rio de Janeiro	17–19 November	Prime Minister Meloni attended the 2024 G20 summit in Rio de Janeiro. She also held bilateral meetings with newly elected Japanese prime minister Shigeru Ishiba, British prime minister Keir Starmer, and the president of World Bank Group Ajay Banga.	
Argentina	Buenos Aires	19–20 November	Prime Minister Meloni travelled to Buenos Aires in order to reaffirm cultural and economic relations with Argentina. On 19 November, she attended an informal dinner with Argentinian president Javier Milei at the Quinta de Olivos. The next day, she laid a wreath at the monument to José de San Martín, then had a meeting with President Milei at the Casa Rosada, where the historical cultural ties between Italy and Argentina, the common will to strengthen bilateral collaborations in strategic sectors such as infrastructure, energy and agriculture and Venezuelan crisis as well were discussed. Later, she met with Mayor of Buenos Aires Jorge Macri and delivered a speech to the Italian community at the Teatro Coliseo before flying home.	
France	Paris	7 December	Prime Minister Meloni participates at the reopening ceremony of Notre-Dame Cathedral. Talks were held on the sidelines of celebrations with President-elect Donald Trump.	
Belgium	Brussels	18–19 December	Prime Minister Meloni attended the EU-Western Balkans Summit. On 19 December she attended the European Council focused on Middle East, Ukraine, Syria, migration and foreign policies issues.	
Finland	Saariselkä	21–22 December	Prime Minister Meloni attended the first EU North-South Summit with Finnish Prime Minister Petteri Orpo, Swedish Prime Minister Ulf Kristersson, Greek Prime Minister Kyriakos Mitsotakis and High Representative of the European Union for Foreign Affairs and Security Policy Kaja Kallas.	
Lithuania	Šiauliai	22 December	Prime Minister Meloni made a quick stop to Šiauliai Air Base, where she met with Italian peacekeepers and soldiers committed to NATO's Baltic Air Policing to celebrate Christmas before flying home.	
Vatican City		24 December	Prime Minister Meloni attended the inaugural mass for the 2025 Jubilee at St. Peter's Basilica.	

== 2025 ==
Country	Location(s)	Dates	Details	Image
United States	Palm Beach	5 January	Prime Minister Meloni paid an unannounced three-hour visit to Palm Beach to meet with President-elect Donald Trump at his Mar-a-Lago residence. They discussed the situation in Middle East and US support to Ukraine, as well as relations with Iran following the arrest of Italian journalist Cecilia Sala. She also met with Secretary of State nominee Marco Rubio, future U.S. National Security Advisor Michael Waltz and Treasury Secretary nominee Scott Bessent.	
United Arab Emirates	Abu Dhabi	15–16 January	Prime Minister Meloni attended the Abu Dhabi Sustainability Week Summit, where she delivered a keynote speech, and met with President Mohamed bin Zayed Al Nahyan and Albanian Prime Minister Edi Rama to sign a tripartite strategic partnership for cross-country green energy cooperation.	
United States	Washington, D.C.	20 January	Prime Minister Meloni is invited to the inauguration ceremony of President Donald Trump.	
Saudi Arabia	Jeddah, Al-Ula	25–27 January	Prime Minister Meloni paid a three-day official visit to Saudi Arabia. In Jeddah, she went aboard the Italian Navy historical training ship Amerigo Vespucci and met with the crew. The next day, she visited Hegra archaeological sit in Al-Ula and met with Crown Prince and Prime Minister of Kingdom of Saudi Arabia Mohammed bin Salman Al Saud, then they attended the Italy-Saudi Arabia high-level round table.	
Bahrain	Manama	27 January	Prime Minister Meloni paid a quick visit to Bahrain, where she met with King Hamad bin Isa Al Khalifa and Crown Prince and Prime Minister Salman bin Hamad Al Khalifa.	
Belgium	Brussels	3 February	Prime Minister Meloni attended an informal European Council focused on defence issues.	
France	Paris	17 February	Prime Minister Meloni attended an emergency summit along leaders of France, Germany, Poland, Spain, Denmark, Netherlands and United Kingdom as well as the president of European Commission and the president of European Council to discuss Europe's response for peace negotiations for the end of Russo-Ukrainian War.	
United Kingdom	London	2 March	Prime Minister Meloni attended the 2025 London Summit on Ukraine. Prior to the summit, she met with Prime Minister Keir Starmer at 10 Downing Street and Ukrainian President Volodymyr Zelenskyy.	
Belgium	Brussels	6 March	Prime Minister Meloni attended an extraordinary European Council focused on defence investments in EU defence issues Ukraine.	
Switzerland	Geneva	7 March	Prime Minister Meloni visited CERN accompanied by Director-general Fabiola Gianotti and met with Italian scientists, then visited the ATLAS detector, one of the largest and most complex scientific instruments ever built to explore the universe, as well as the Large Hadron Collider tunnel, the world's most powerful particle accelerator. Lastly, President Meloni visited the Science Gateway, the science education and outreach centre designed by Renzo Piano.	
Belgium	Brussels	19–20 March	Prime Minister Meloni attended the European Council focused on defence, migration, Ukraine, Middle East and European competitiveness.	
France	Paris	27 March	Prime Minister Meloni attended the Summit on Peace and Security for Ukraine in Paris in which long-term support, implementation of the ceasefire and security guarantees for Ukraine were discussed.	
United States	Washington, D.C.	17 April	Prime Minister Meloni met with U.S. President Donald Trump at the White House. They discussed protectiv tariffs, increasing defence spending, Ukraine, Middle East, US-EU relations, energy and relations with China.	
Vatican City	Vatican City	26 April	Prime Minister Meloni attended the funeral of Pope Francis at St. Peter's Square.	
Albania	Tirana	17 May	Prime Minister Meloni attended the 6th European Political Community Summit.	
Vatican City	Vatican City	18 May	Prime Minister Meloni attended the Inauguration of Pope Leo XIV at St. Peter's Square.	
Uzbekistan	Samarkand	29 May	Prime Minister Meloni held a bilateral meeting with President Shavkat Mirziyoyev, following which the signing ceremony of the bilateral agreements was held.	
Kazakhstan	Astana	30 May	Prime Minister Meloni attended the Astana Italy-Central Asia Summit. In the morning, she gave a speech at the Astana International Forum, followed by a bilateral meeting with the Kazakh president, Kassym-Jomart Tokayev, and signing bilateral agreements. During the day, she met with the president of the Republic of Kyrgyzstan, Sadyr Japarov, the president of the Republic of Tajikistan, Emomali Rahmon, the president of the Republic of Turkmenistan, Serdar Berdimuhamedow.	
Canada	Kananaskis	15–17 June	Prime Minister Meloni attended the 51st G7 summit.	
Netherlands	The Hague	24–26 June	Prime Minister Meloni attended the 2025 NATO summit.	
Belgium	Brussels	26–27 June	Prime Minister Meloni attended the European Council summit.	
Ethiopia	Addis Ababa	28–29 July	Prime Minister Meloni participated in the United Nations Food Systems Summit, co-chaired by Ethiopia and Italy.	
Tunisia	Tunis	31 July	Prime Minister Meloni on an official visit to the Republic of Tunisia, met President Kais Saied at the Presidential Palace in Carthage.	
Turkey	Istanbul	1 August	Prime Minister Meloni held a trilateral meeting in Istanbul with President Recep Tayyip Erdoğan, and with the prime minister of the Libyan Government of National Unity, Abdul Hamid Dbeibeh, at the Dolmabahç Palace.	
Serbia	Belgrade	5 August	Prime Minister Meloni met with President Aleksandar Vučić.	
United States	Washington, D.C.	18 August	Prime Minister Meloni attended a White House multilateral meeting on Ukraine, in which she held peace talks with President Donald Trump, Ukrainian president Volodymyr Zelenskyy, and other European leaders following the Trump–Putin Alaska Summit.	
United States	New York City	23–24 September	Prime Minister Meloni attended the 80th United Nations General Assembly.	
Denmark	Copenhagen	1–2 October	Prime Minister Meloni attended the 7th European Political Community Summit.	
Egypt	Sharm El Sheikh	13 October	Prime Minister Meloni attended the 2025 Gaza peace summit.	
Belgium	Brussels	23 October	Prime Minister Meloni attended the European Council summit.	
South Africa	Johannesburg	22–23 November	Prime Minister Meloni attended the 2025 G20 summit.	
Angola	Luanda	24–25 November	Prime Minister Meloni attended the 7th European Union–African Union summit.	
Bahrain	Manama	2–3 December	Prime Minister Meloni attended the Gulf Cooperation Council summit. During the day, she met with the King of Bahrain Hamad bin Isa Al Khalifa, the Sultan of Oman Haitham bin Tariq, the Emir of Kuwait Mishal Al-Ahmad Al-Jaber Al-Sabah and the Crown Prince of Saudi Arabia Mohammed bin Salman	
Germany	Berlin	15 December	Prime Minister Meloni attended today's Leaders’ meeting on Ukraine in Berlin.	
Belgium	Brussels	18–19 December	Prime Minister Meloni attended the European Council summit.	

== 2026 ==
Country	Location(s)	Dates	Details	Image
France	Paris	6 January	Prime Minister Meloni attended a meeting with heads of state and government in the Coalition of the Willing.	
Oman	Muscat	14 January	Prime Minister Meloni held a bilateral meeting with Sultan Haitham bin Tariq at the Al Baraka Palace.	
Japan	Tokyo	15–17 January	Prime Minister Meloni held a bilateral meeting with Prime Minister Sanae Takaichi, and also met with the heads of major Japanese multinational companies.	
South Korea	Seoul	17–19 January	Prime Minister Meloni visited the Seoul National Cemetery, which honors soldiers who died for the nation, particularly during the Korean War. On January 18, she met with Italian businessmen operating in South Korea. On January 19, she held a bilateral meeting with President Lee Jae Myung.	
Uzbekistan	Tashkent	19 January	Prime Minister Meloni held a bilateral meeting with President Shavkat Mirziyoyev.	
Belgium	Brussels	22 January	Prime Minister Meloni attended an informal European Council summit.	
Belgium	Rijkhoven	12 February	Prime Minister Meloni attended an informal European Council summit.	
Ethiopia	Addis Ababa	13–14 February	Prime Minister Meloni attended the Second Italy–Africa Summit, focused on the progress of the Mattei Plan for Africa, which was unveiled in Rome during the First Italy–Africa Summit of 2024. In addition, she attended the 39th Session of the Assembly of the African Union.	
Belgium	Brussels	19–20 March	Prime Minister Meloni attended the European Council summit.	
Algeria	Algiers	25 March	Prime Minister Meloni met with Prime Minister Sifi Ghrieb upon arrival, and subsequently laid a wreath at the Martyrs' Memorial. She then held a bilateral meeting with President Abdelmadjid Tebboune at the El Mouradia Palace.	
Saudi Arabia	Jeddah	3–4 April	Prime Minister Meloni held a bilateral meeting with Crown Prince and Prime Minister Mohammed bin Salman Al Saud.	
Qatar	Doha	4 April	Prime Minister Meloni held a bilateral meeting with Emir Tamim bin Hamad Al Thani.	
United Arab Emirates	Al Ain	4 April	Prime Minister Meloni held a bilateral meeting with President Mohamed bin Zayed Al Nahyan.	
France	Paris	17 April	Prime Minister Meloni attended a summit at the Élysée Palace, jointly chaired by French president Emmanuel Macron and British prime minister Keir Starmer, that aimed at advancing plans for a multinational maritime force to secure the Strait of Hormuz, in anticipation of an end to the 2026 Iran war.	
Cyprus	Ayia Napa	23–24 April	Prime Minister Meloni attended an informal European Council summit.	
Armenia	Yerevan	3–4 May	Prime Minister Meloni attended the 8th European Political Community Summit.	
Azerbaijan	Baku	4 May	Prime Minister Meloni held a bilateral meeting with President Ilham Aliyev.	
Greece	Pylos	16 May	Prime Minister Meloni attended the first Europe–Gulf Forum. On the sidelines, she also met with the Greek Prime Minister Kyriakos Mitsotakis, the Maltese Prime Minister Robert Abela (via videolink), and the Cypriot President Nikos Christodoulidis to discuss the potential migration issues related to the current Middle Eastern crisis; and held a bilateral meeting with the Prime Minister of Kuwait Sheikh Ahmad Al-Abdullah Al-Sabah.	
France	Évian-les-Bains	15–17 June	Prime Minister Meloni attended the 52nd G7 summit.	
Belgium	Brussels	18–19 June	Prime Minister Meloni attended the European Council summit.	
Germany	Berlin	24 June	Prime Minister Meloni attended an E5 meeting with Chancellor Friedrich Merz, British prime minister Keir Starmer, French president Emmanuel Macron, and Polish prime minister Donald Tusk, focused on preparation for the upcoming NATO summit.	
France	Antibes	25 June	Prime Minister Meloni met with President Emmanuel Macron as part of a Italy–France intergovernmental summit.	
Turkey	Ankara	7–8 July	Prime Minister Meloni attended the 2026 NATO summit. On the sidelines, she also held bilateral meetings with Ukrainian president Volodymyr Zelenskyy, and with President Recep Tayyip Erdoğan.	
Qatar	Doha	14 July	Prime Minister Meloni attended a ceremony to pay respects following the death of Sheikh Hamad bin Khalifa Al Thani.	
Norway	Oslo	17 September	Prime Minister Meloni held a bilateral meeting with Prime Minister Jonas Gahr Støre.	
Czech Republic	Prague	29 September	Prime Minister Meloni held a bilateral meeting with Prime Minister Andrej Babiš.	
Croatia	Split	7 October	Prime Minister Meloni attended the 13th EU Med Summit.	
Belgium	Brussels	15–16 October	Prime Minister Meloni attended the European Council summit.	
Kuwait	Kuwait City	23 October	Prime Minister Meloni held a bilateral meeting with the Emir Sheikh Mishal Al-Ahmad Al-Jaber Al-Sabah, the Crown Prince Sheikh Sabah Al-Khalid Al-Sabah, and the Prime Minister Sheikh Ahmad Al-Abdullah Al-Sabah, to delineate the Italy–Kuwait Action Plan 2027–2030.	
Ireland	Dublin	12 November	Prime Minister Meloni attended the 9th European Political Community Summit.	
Germany	Berlin	19 November	Prime Minister Meloni attended a meeting with heads of state and government in the Coalition of the Willing.	

== Future trips ==
This is a list of international trips that Prime Minister Meloni is expected to undertake in 2026, based either on official confirmation or on reliable media reports.

Country	Location(s)	Dates	Details
United States	Miami	14–15 December	Prime Minister Meloni is scheduled to attend the 2026 G20 summit.
Belgium	Brussels	17–18 December	Prime Minister Meloni is scheduled to attend the European Council summit.

== Multilateral meetings ==
Giorgia Meloni participated in the following summits during her premiership:

Group	Year					
Group	2022	2023	2024	2025	2026	2027
UNGA		20–23 September, (United States) New York City	24–27 September, (United States) New York City	23–24 September, (United States) New York City	22–23 September,^{[a]} (United States) New York City	TBA, (United States) New York City
NATO		11–12 July, (Lithuania) Vilnius	9–11 July, (United States) Washington, D.C.	24–26 June, (Netherlands) The Hague	7–8 July, (Turkey) Ankara	TBA, (Albania) Tirana
G7		19–21 May (Japan) Hiroshima	13–15 June (Italy) Fasano	16–17 June, (Canada) Kananaskis	15–17 June, (France) Évian-les-Bains	TBA, United States
G20	15–16 November, (Indonesia) Bali	9–10 September (India) New Delhi	18–19 November (Brazil) Rio de Janeiro	22–23 November, (South Africa) Johannesburg	14–15 December, (United States) Miami	27–28 November, (United Kingdom) Manchester
MED9	9 December, (Spain) Alicante	29 September, (Malta) Mdina	11 October, (Cyprus) Paphos	20 October,^{[b]} (Slovenia) Portorož	7 October, (Croatia) Split	TBA, Portugal
EPC		1 June, (Moldova) Bulboaca	18 July, (United Kingdom) Woodstock	16 May, (Albania) Tirana	4 May, (Armenia) Yerevan	April, (Switzerland) Zurich
EPC		5 October, (Spain) Granada	7 November, (Hungary) Budapest	2 October, (Denmark) Copenhagen	12 November, (Republic of Ireland) Dublin	TBA, Greece
UNCCC	11 November (Egypt) Sharm el-Sheikh	30 November – 3 December (United Arab Emirates) Dubai	12 November (Azerbaijan) Baku	10 November, (Brazil) Belém	9 November,^{[c]} (Turkey) Antalya	8 – 19 November, (Ethiopia) Addis Ababa
Others	None		Global Peace Summit; 15–16 June (Switzerland) Lucerne	Securing our future 2 March, (United Kingdom) London	Together for peace and security summit 6 January (France) Paris	TBA
Others	None		Global Peace Summit; 15–16 June (Switzerland) Lucerne	15 March, (videoconference); United Kingdom	Together for peace and security summit 6 January (France) Paris	TBA
Others	None		Global Peace Summit; 15–16 June (Switzerland) Lucerne	Building a robust peace for Ukraine and Europe; 27 March, (France) Paris	Together for peace and security summit 6 January (France) Paris	TBA
██ = Did not attend; ██ = Future event.^a^b Deputy Prime Minister and Foreign Minister Antonio Tajani attended in the Prime Minister's place.^c Minister of the Environment and Energy Security Gilberto Pichetto Fratin attended in the Prime Minister's place.
