= Prime Minister of Italy =

Head of government

President of the Council of Ministers of the Italian Republic
- Presidente del Consiglio dei ministri della Repubblica Italiana
- Seal of the presidency of the Council of Ministers

- Flag of the President of the Council of Ministers

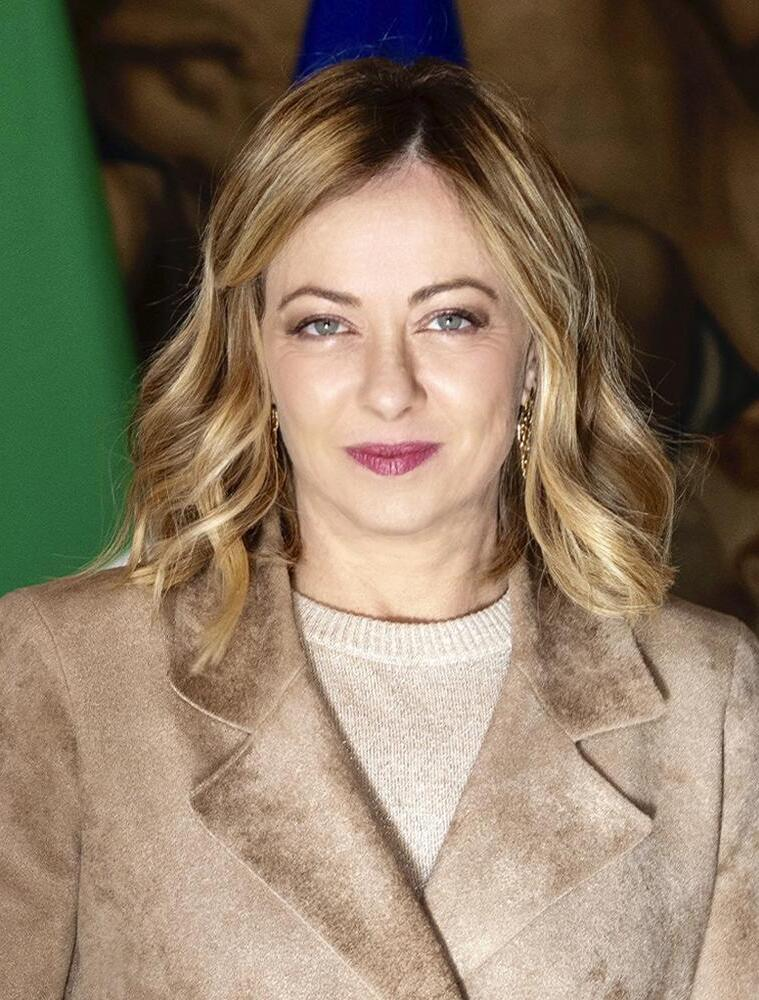
- Incumbent; Giorgia Meloni since 22 October 2022
- Council of Ministers of the Italian Republic; Government of Italy
- Style: President (reference and spoken); Premier (reference, informal); Her Excellency (diplomatic)
- Member of: Council of Ministers; High Council of Defence; European Council
- Residence: Chigi Palace
- Seat: Rome
- Appointer: President of the Republic
- Term length: Not fixed, remains in office if able to command a parliamentary majority
- Inaugural holder: Alcide De Gasperi (republic); Camillo Benso di Cavour (original)
- Formation: 17 March 1861; 165 years ago
- Deputy: Deputy Prime Minister
- Salary: €99,000 per annum
- Website: www.governo.it/en/

The prime minister of Italy, officially the president of the Council of Ministers (Italian: presidente del Consiglio dei ministri), is the head of government of the Italian Republic. The office of president of the Council of Ministers is established by articles 92–96 of the Constitution of Italy; the president of the Council of Ministers is appointed by the president of the Italian Republic and must have the confidence of the parliament to stay in office.

Prior to the establishment of the Italian Republic, the position was known as the president of the Council of Ministers of the Kingdom of Italy (Presidente del Consiglio dei ministri del Regno d'Italia). From 1925 to 1943 during the Italian fascist regime, the position was transformed into the dictatorial position as the Head of the Government, Prime Minister, Secretary of State (Capo del Governo, Primo Ministro, Segretario di Stato), held by Benito Mussolini, the Duce of fascism, who officially governed on the behalf of the king of Italy. King Victor Emmanuel III removed Mussolini from office in 1943 and the position was restored with Marshal Pietro Badoglio becoming prime minister in 1943, although the original denomination of president of the Council of Ministers was only restored in 1944, when Ivanoe Bonomi was appointed to the post. Alcide De Gasperi became the first prime minister of the Italian Republic in 1946.

The prime minister is the president of the Council of Ministers, which holds executive power and the position is similar to those in most other parliamentary systems. The formal Italian order of precedence lists the office as being ceremonially the fourth-highest Italian state office after the president and the presiding officers of the two houses of the Italian Parliament. In practice, the prime minister is the country's political leader and de facto chief executive. Giorgia Meloni has been the incumbent prime minister since 22 October 2022 and she is the first woman to hold the office in the history of the Italian Republic.

== Functions ==
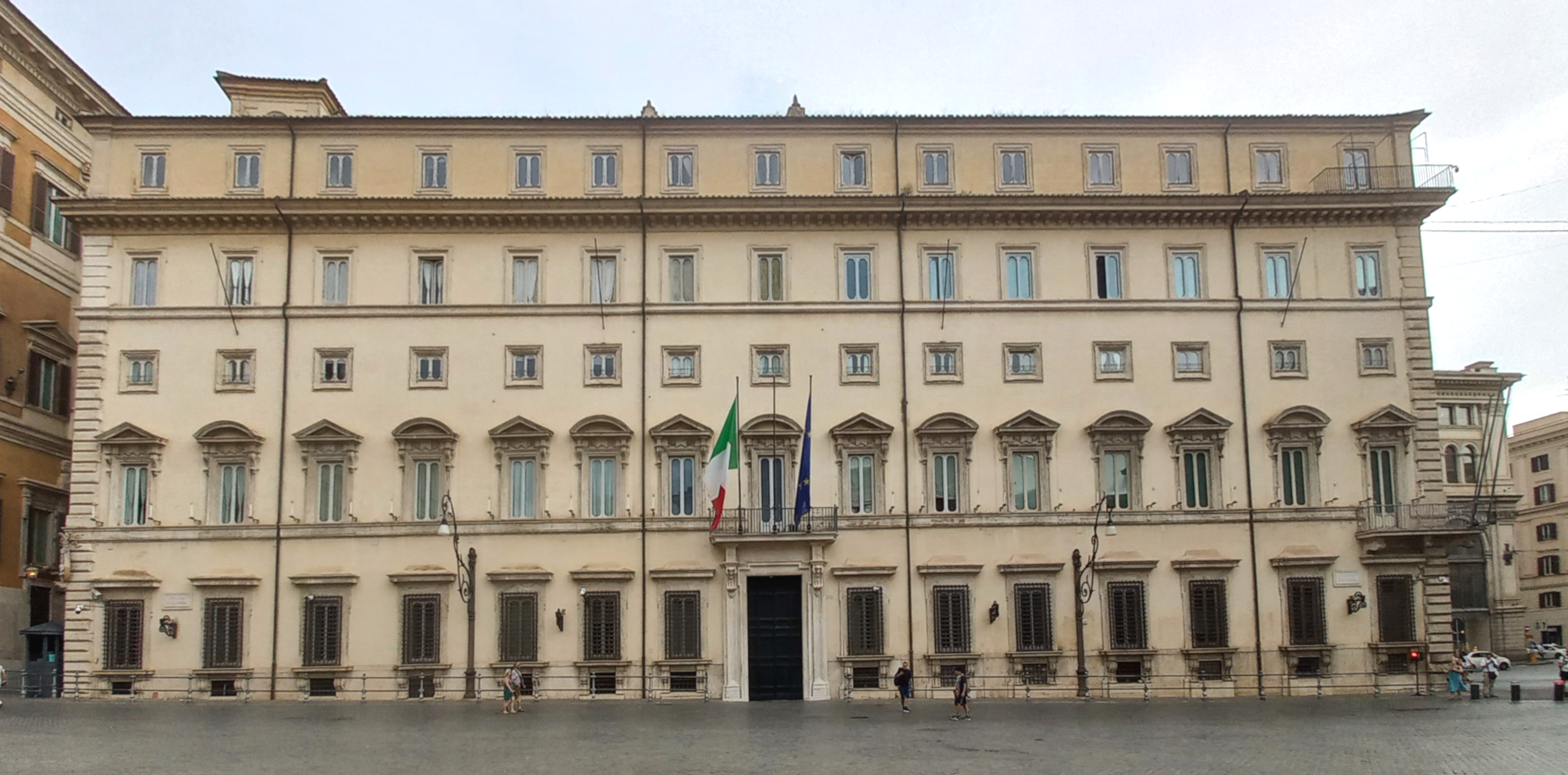
Chigi Palace in Rome, the seat of the Council of Ministers and the official residence of the Prime Minister of Italy.

As the president of the Council of Ministers, the prime minister is required by the Constitution of Italy (1948) to have the supreme confidence of the majority of the voting members of Parliament. In addition to powers inherent in being a member of the Cabinet, the prime minister holds specific powers, most notably being able to nominate a list of Cabinet ministers to be appointed by the president of the Republic and the countersigning of all legislative instruments having the force of law that are signed by the president of the Republic.

Article 95 of the Italian constitution provides that the prime minister "directs and coordinates the activity of the ministers". This power has been used to a quite variable extent in the history of the Italian state as it is strongly influenced by the political strength of individual ministers and thus by the parties they represent.

The prime minister's activity has often consisted of mediating between the various parties in the majority coalition, rather than directing the activity of the Council of Ministers. The prime minister's supervisory power is further limited by the lack of any formal authority to fire ministers. In the past, in order to make a cabinet reshuffle, prime ministers have sometimes resigned so that they could be re-appointed by the president and allowed to form a new cabinet with new ministers. In order to do this the prime minister needs the support of the president, who could theoretically refuse to re-appoint them following their resignation.

== History ==
The office was first established in 1848 in Italy's predecessor state, the Kingdom of Sardinia—although it was not mentioned in its constitution, the Albertine Statute.

=== Historical Right and Historical Left ===
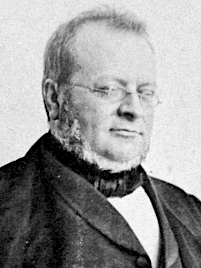
Count Camillo Benso of Cavour, first Italian Prime Minister

After the unification of Italy and the establishment of the kingdom, the procedure did not change. In fact, the candidate for office was appointed by the king and presided over a very unstable political system. The first prime minister was Camillo Benso di Cavour, who was appointed on 23 March 1861, but he died on 6 June the same year. From 1861 to 1911, Historical Right and Historical Left prime ministers alternatively governed the country.

According to the letter of the Statuto Albertino, the prime minister and other ministers were politically responsible to the king and legally responsible to Parliament. With time, it became all but impossible for a king to appoint a government entirely of his own choosing or keep it in office against the will of Parliament. As a result, in practice the prime minister was now both politically and legally responsible to Parliament, and had to maintain its confidence to stay in office.

One of the most famous and influential prime ministers of this period was Francesco Crispi, a left-wing patriot and statesman, the first head of the government from Southern Italy. He led the country for six years from 1887 until 1891 and again from 1893 until 1896. Crispi was internationally famous and often mentioned along with world statesmen such as Otto von Bismarck, William Ewart Gladstone and Salisbury.

Originally an enlightened Italian patriot and democrat liberal, Crispi went on to become a bellicose authoritarian prime minister, ally and admirer of Bismarck. His career ended amid controversy and failure due to becoming involved in a major banking scandal and subsequently fell from power in 1896 after a devastating colonial defeat in Ethiopia. He is often seen as a precursor of the fascist dictator Benito Mussolini.

=== Giolittian Era ===
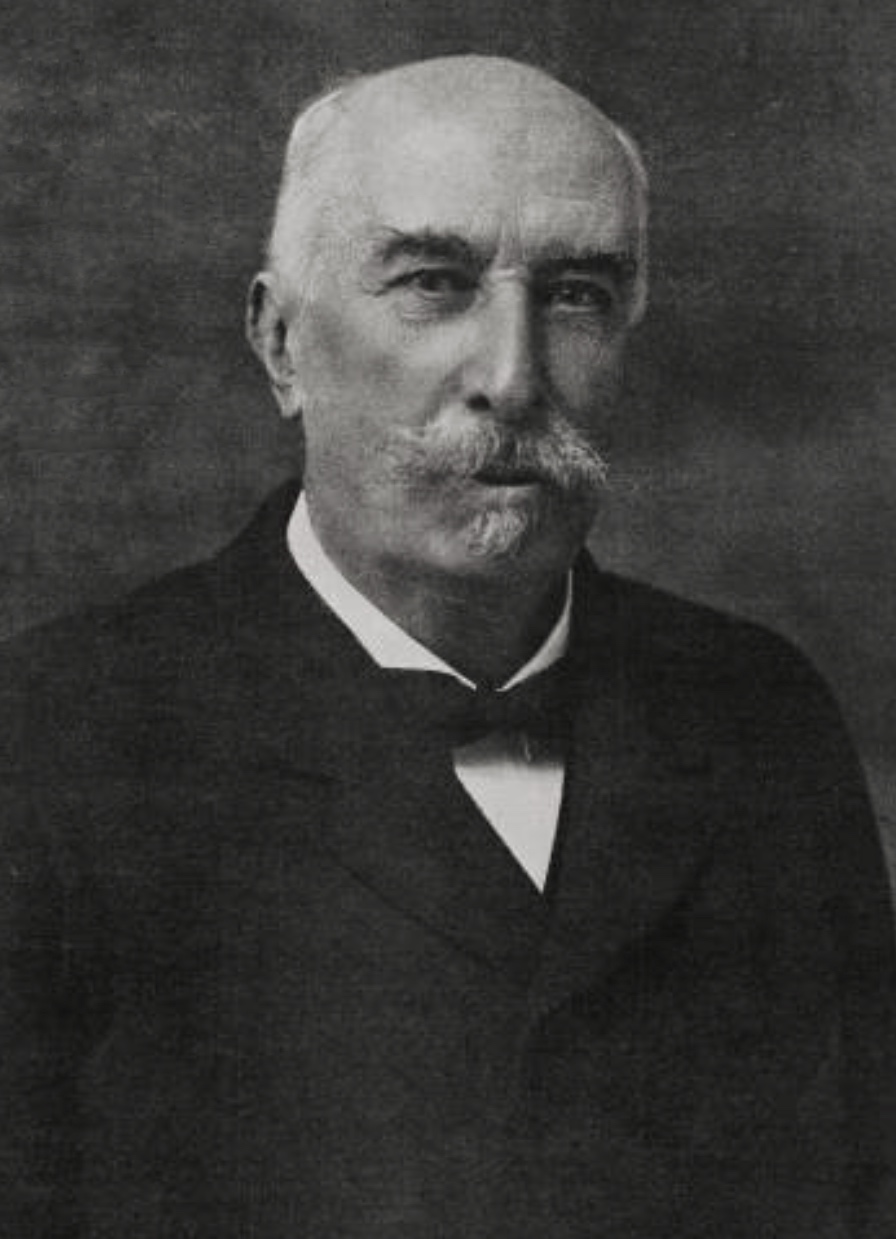
Giovanni Giolitti, longest-serving democratically elected Prime Minister in Italian history, and the second-longest serving overall after Mussolini

In 1892, Giovanni Giolitti, a leftist lawyer and politician, was appointed prime minister by King Umberto I, but after less than a year he was forced to resign and Crispi returned to power. In 1903, he was appointed again head of the government after a period of instability. Giolitti was prime minister five times between 1892 and 1921 and the second-longest serving prime minister in Italian history.

Giolitti was a master in the political art of trasformismo, the method of making a flexible, fluid centrist coalition in Parliament that sought to isolate the extremes of the left (Historical Far Left) and the right (Conservative Catholics) in Italian politics. Under his influence, the Italian Liberals did not develop as a structured party. They were instead a series of informal personal groupings with no formal links to political constituencies.

The period between the start of the 20th century and the start of World War I, when he was prime minister and Minister of the Interior from 1901 to 1914 with only brief interruptions, is often called the Giolittian Era. A left-wing liberal, with strong ethical concerns, Giolitti's periods in the office were notable for the passage of a wide range of progressive social reforms which improved the living standards of ordinary Italians, together with the enactment of several policies of government intervention.

Besides putting in place several tariffs, subsidies and government projects, Giolitti nationalized the private telephone and railroad operators. Liberal proponents of free trade criticized what they called the Giolittian System, although Giolitti himself saw the development of the national economy as essential in the production of wealth.

=== Fascist regime ===
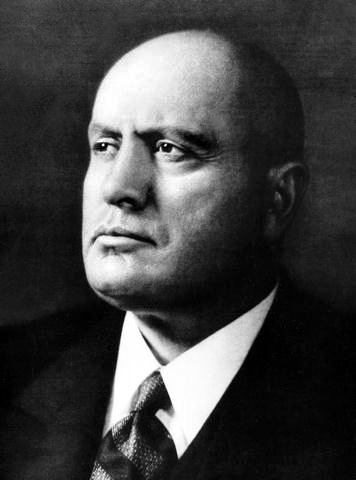
Benito Mussolini, the longest-serving prime minister of Italy and Duce of fascism

The Italian prime minister presided over a very unstable political system as in its first sixty years of existence (1861–1921) Italy changed its head of the government 37 times. Regarding this situation, the first goal of Benito Mussolini, who was appointed in October 1922 after the March on Rome, was to abolish the Parliament's ability to put him to a vote of no confidence, basing his power on the will of the King and the National Fascist Party (PNF) alone. After destroying all political opposition through his secret police and outlawing labor strikes, Mussolini and his Italian fascist followers consolidated their power through a series of laws that transformed the nation into a one-party dictatorship. Within five years, he had established dictatorial authority by both legal and extraordinary means, aspiring to create a totalitarian state. In 1925, the title of "President of the Council of Ministers" was changed into "Head of the Government, Prime Minister, Secretary of State", symbolizing the new dictatorial powers of Mussolini. The convention that the prime minister was responsible to Parliament had become so entrenched that Mussolini had to pass a law stating that he was not responsible to Parliament.

Mussolini remained in power until he was deposed by King Victor Emmanuel III in 1943 following a vote of no confidence by the Grand Council of Fascism and replaced by Marshal Pietro Badoglio. A few months later, Italy was invaded by Nazi Germany as part of Operation Achse and Mussolini was reinstated as head of a puppet State called Italian Social Republic, while the authorities of the Kingdom were forced to relocate in Southern Italy, which was under the control of the Allied Forces. In 1944, Badoglio resigned and Ivanoe Bonomi was appointed to the post of prime minister, restoring the old title of president of the Council of Ministers. Bonomi was briefly succeeded by Ferruccio Parri in 1945 and then by Alcide De Gasperi, leader of the newly formed Christian Democracy (DC) political party.

=== First decades of the Italian Republic ===
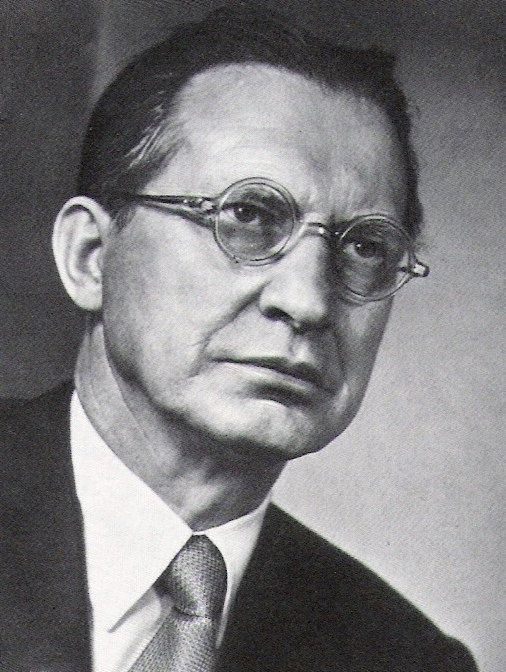
Alcide De Gasperi, the first prime minister of the Italian Republic

Following the 1946 Italian institutional referendum, the monarchy was abolished and De Gasperi became the first Prime Minister of the Italian Republic. The First Republic was dominated by the Christian Democracy, which was the senior party in each government coalitions from 1946 to 1994 while the opposition was led by the Italian Communist Party (PCI), the largest one in Western Europe. In the first years of the Republic, the governments were led by De Gasperi, who is also considered a founding father of the European Union. After the death of De Gasperi, Italy returned in a period of political instability and a lot of cabinets were formed in few decades. The second part of the 20th century was dominated by De Gasperi's protégé Giulio Andreotti, who was appointed prime minister seven times from 1972 to 1992.

From the late 1960s until the early 1980s, the country experienced the Years of Lead, a period characterised by economic crisis (especially after the 1973 oil crisis), widespread social conflicts and terrorist massacres carried out by opposing extremist groups, with the alleged involvement of United States and Soviet intelligence. The Years of Lead culminated in the assassination of the Christian Democrat leader Aldo Moro in 1978 and the Bologna railway station massacre in 1980, where 85 people died.

In the 1980s, for the first time since 1945, two governments were led by non-Christian Democrat prime ministers: Giovanni Spadolini of the Italian Republican Party (PRI) and Bettino Craxi of the Italian Socialist Party (PSI), although the Christian Democrats remained the main government party. During Craxi's government, the economy recovered and Italy became the world's fifth-largest industrial nation, gaining entry into the Group of Seven; however, as a result of his spending policies, the Italian national debt skyrocketed during the Craxi era, soon passing 100% of the GDP.

In the early 1990s, Italy faced significant challenges as voters—disenchanted with political paralysis, massive public debt and the extensive corruption system (known as Tangentopoli) uncovered by the "Clean Hands" (Mani pulite) investigation—demanded radical reforms. The scandals involved all major parties, but especially those in the government coalition: the Christian Democrats, who ruled for almost 50 years, underwent a severe crisis and eventually disbanded, splitting up into several factions. Moreover, the Communist Party was reorganised as a social-democratic force, the Democratic Party of the Left (PDS).

=== Second Republic ===
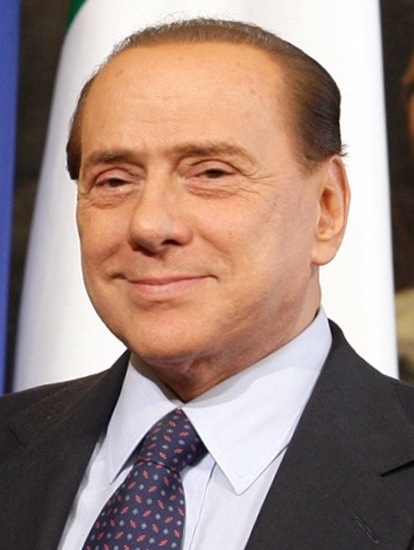
Silvio Berlusconi, the second longest-serving post-war prime minister

In the midst of the Mani pulite investigation, which shook political parties in 1994, media magnate Silvio Berlusconi, owner of three private TV channels, founded Forza Italia (Forward Italy) party and won the 1994 Italian general election, becoming one of Italy's most important political and economic figures for the next decade. Berlusconi is also the longest-serving prime minister in the history of the Italian Republic and the third-longest serving in the whole history after Mussolini and Giolitti.

Ousted after a few months of government and following a loss in 1996 to The Olive Tree, Berlusconi returned to power in 2001. Subsequently, he lost the 2006 Italian general election to Romano Prodi and The Union. Following the fall of the second Prodi government, Berlusconi won the 2008 Italian general election and was elected prime minister for the third time in May 2008. In November 2011, Berlusconi lost his majority in the Chamber of Deputies and resigned. His successor, Mario Monti, formed a new government, composed of "technicians" and supported by both centre-left and centre-right parties.

In April 2013, after the 2013 Italian general election in February resulted in a hung parliament, the Democratic Party (PD) deputy secretary Enrico Letta led a grand coalition composed by the PD and the centre-right People of Freedom (PdL), the two largest parties, and minor centrist parties, including Monti's Civic Choice (SC). In November 2013, the PdL exited the Letta government, de facto ending the grand coalition between the PD and the PdL. Led by Angelino Alfano, the centre-right coalition candidate for prime minister in 2013, dissidents within the PdL established the New Centre-Right (NCD) and joined the government majority still led by Letta.

On 22 February 2014, after tensions in the PD, the party secretary Matteo Renzi was sworn in as the new prime minister, with the support of NCD and some of the remaining parties of Letta's coalition. As part of the Nazareno Pact with Berlusconi and his 2013-refounded Forza Italia (FI), Renzi proposed several reforms, including a constitutional reform that would radical overhaul of the Senate of the Republic and a new electoral law (Italicum); however, the Nazareno Pact was called off the 2015 Italian presidential election of Sergio Mattarella, Italicum was ultimately found unconstitutional, and the proposed reforms were rejected in the 2016 Italian constitutional referendum in December.

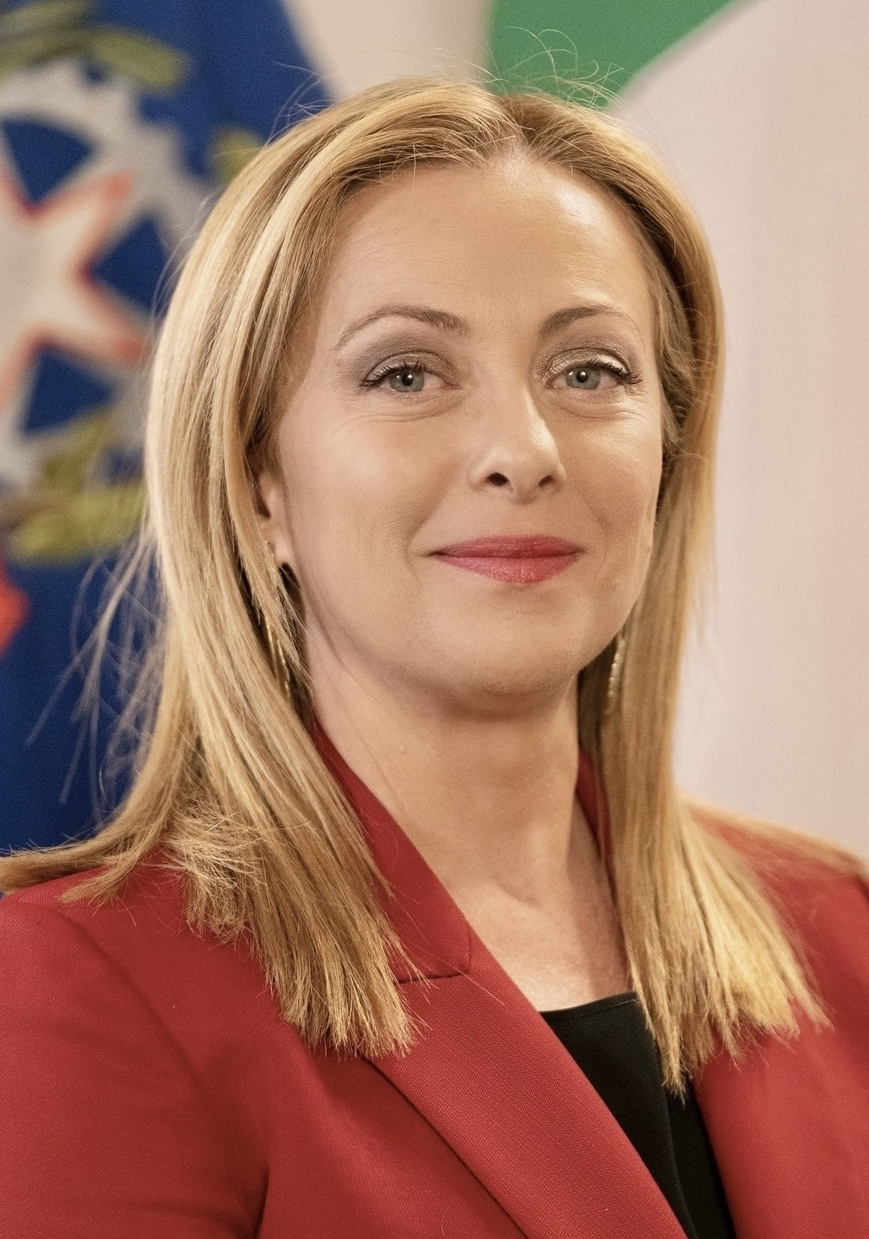
Giorgia Meloni, the first female prime minister of Italy

Following the referendum's results, Renzi resigned and his Foreign Affairs Minister Paolo Gentiloni was appointed new prime minister, acting as a caretaker government during the remaining one year and half of the legislature. On 1 June 2018, after the 2018 Italian general election where the anti-establishment and populist Five Star Movement become the largest party in Parliament, Giuseppe Conte (an independent politician close to the M5S) was sworn in as prime minister at the head of a populist coalition of the M5S and the League (Lega). After the 2019 European Parliament election in Italy, where the League exceeded the M5S, Matteo Salvini (leader of the League) proposed a no-confidence vote in the first Conte government and Conte resigned. After the consultations between the President Sergio Mattarella and the political parties, Conte was reappointed as prime minister, heading the second Conte government, a coalition between the M5S and the PD of Nicola Zingaretti.

In January 2021, the centrist party Italia Viva, led by Renzi, withdrew its support to Conte's government. In February 2021, President Mattarella appointed Mario Draghi, former president of the European Central Bank, as prime minister. His new cabinet, a national unity government, was supported by most Italian parties, including the League, M5S, PD, and FI. In October 2022, after the centre-right coalition won the 2022 Italian general election in September, President Mattarella appointed Giorgia Meloni of Brothers of Italy (FdI) as Italy's first female prime minister, following the fall of the Draghi government in July 2022 leading to a snap election.

== Living former prime ministers of Italy ==
As of 23 September 2026, there are ten living former prime ministers. The most recent death of a former prime minister was that of Arnaldo Forlani (1980–1981) on 6 July 2023 at age 97.

Living former prime ministers of Italy

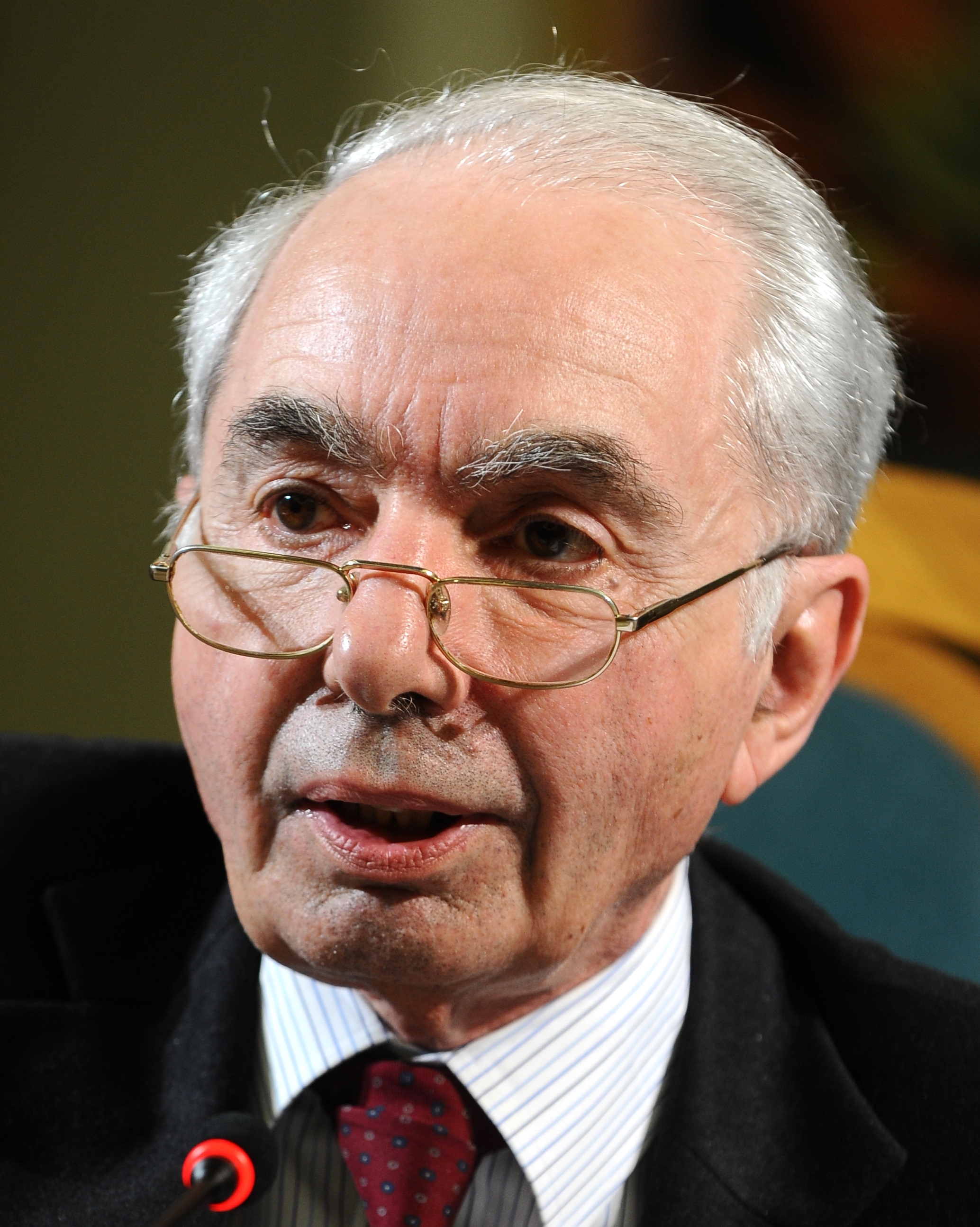
Giuliano Amato
1992–1993
2000–2001
13 May 1938 (age 88)

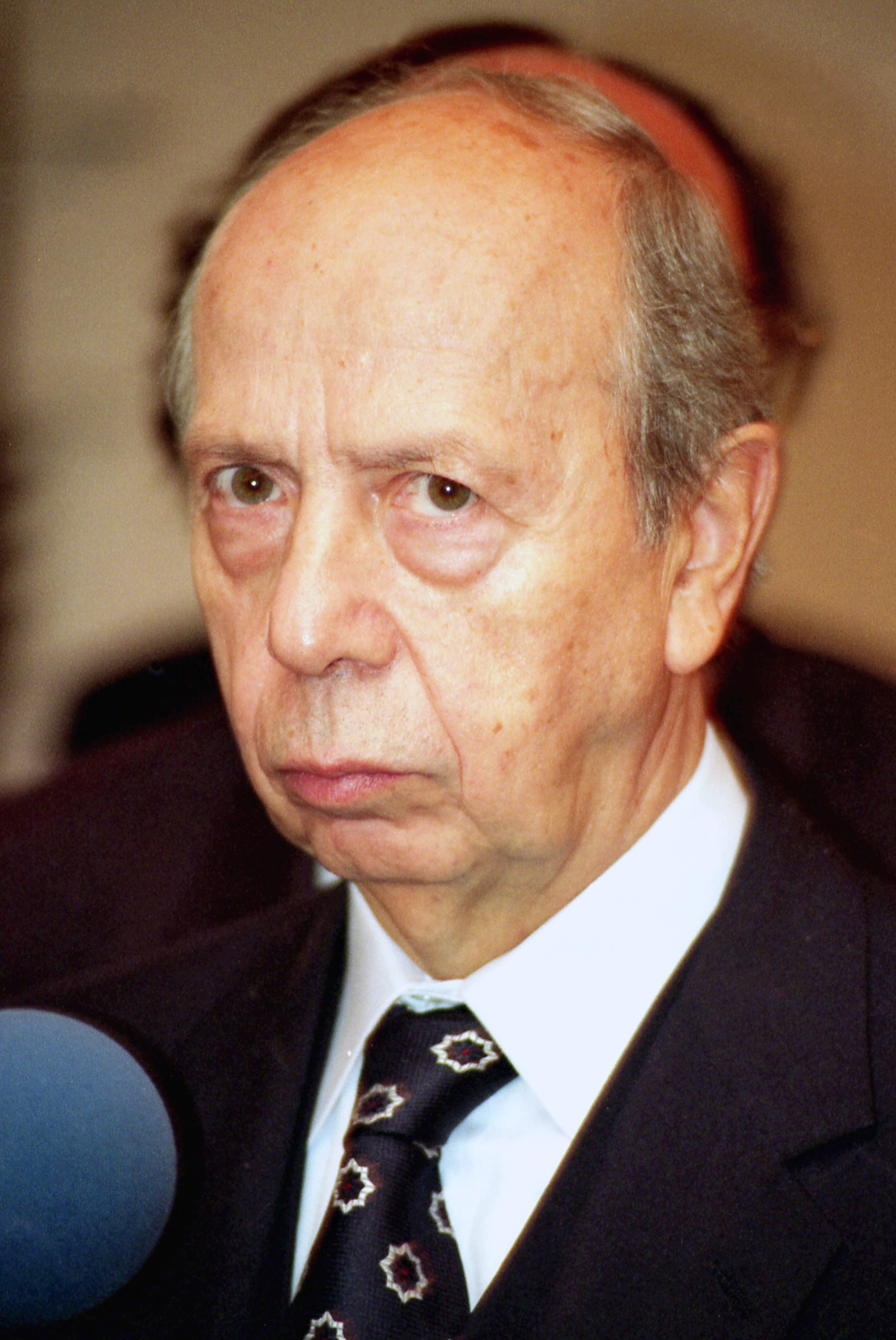
Lamberto Dini
1995–1996
1 March 1931 (age 95)

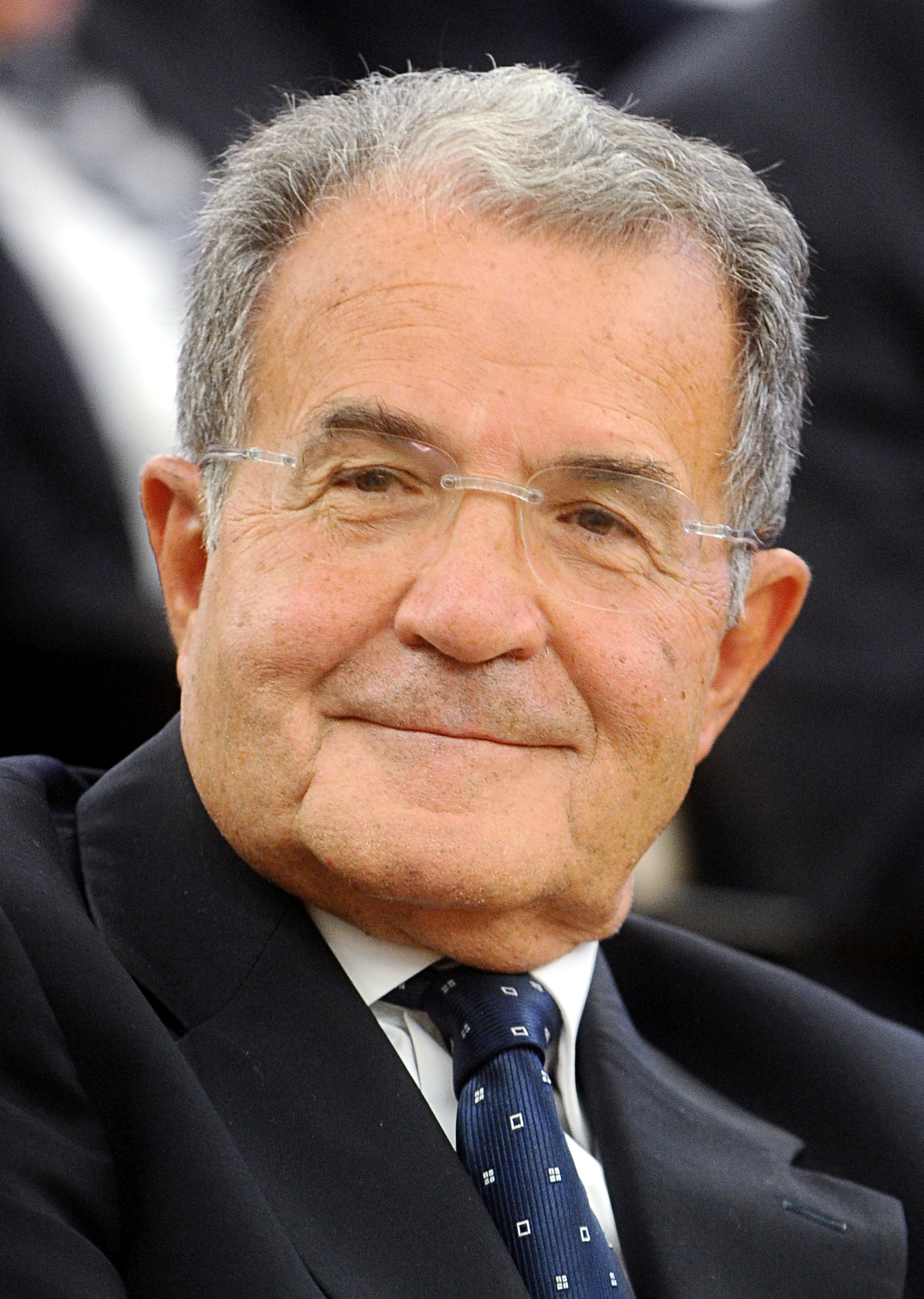
Romano Prodi
1996–1998
2006–2008
9 August 1939 (age 87)

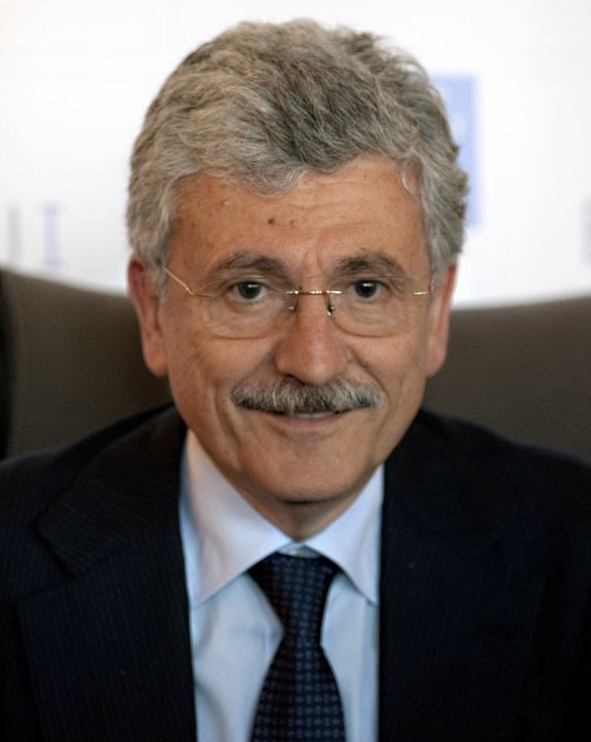
Massimo D'Alema
1998–2000
20 April 1949 (age 77)

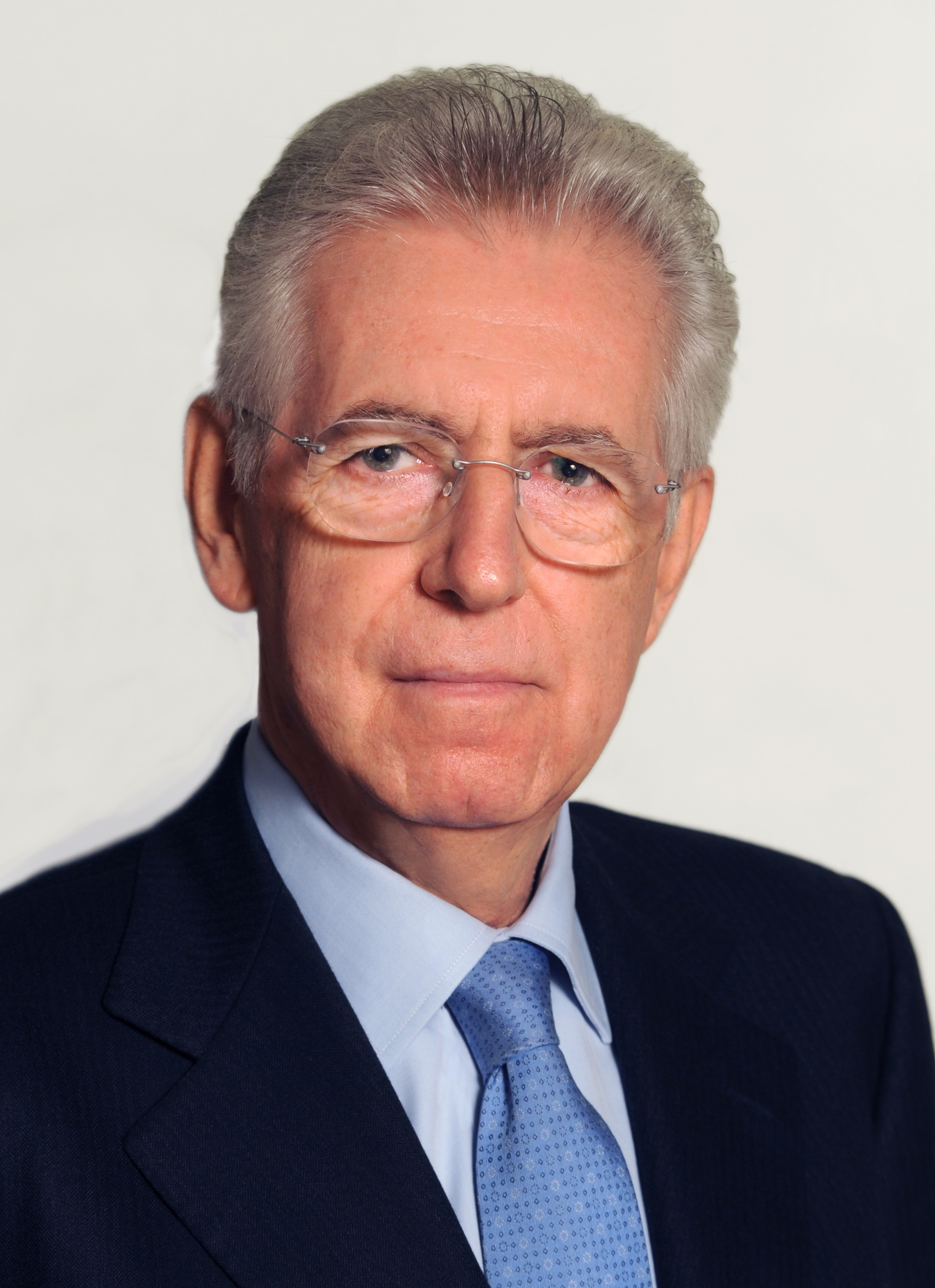
Mario Monti
2011–2013
19 March 1943 (age 83)

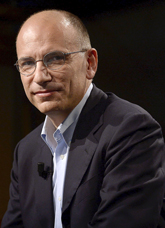
Enrico Letta
2013–2014
20 August 1966 (age 60)

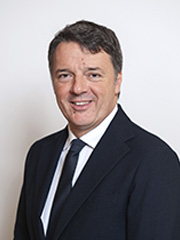
Matteo Renzi
2014–2016
11 January 1975 (age 51)

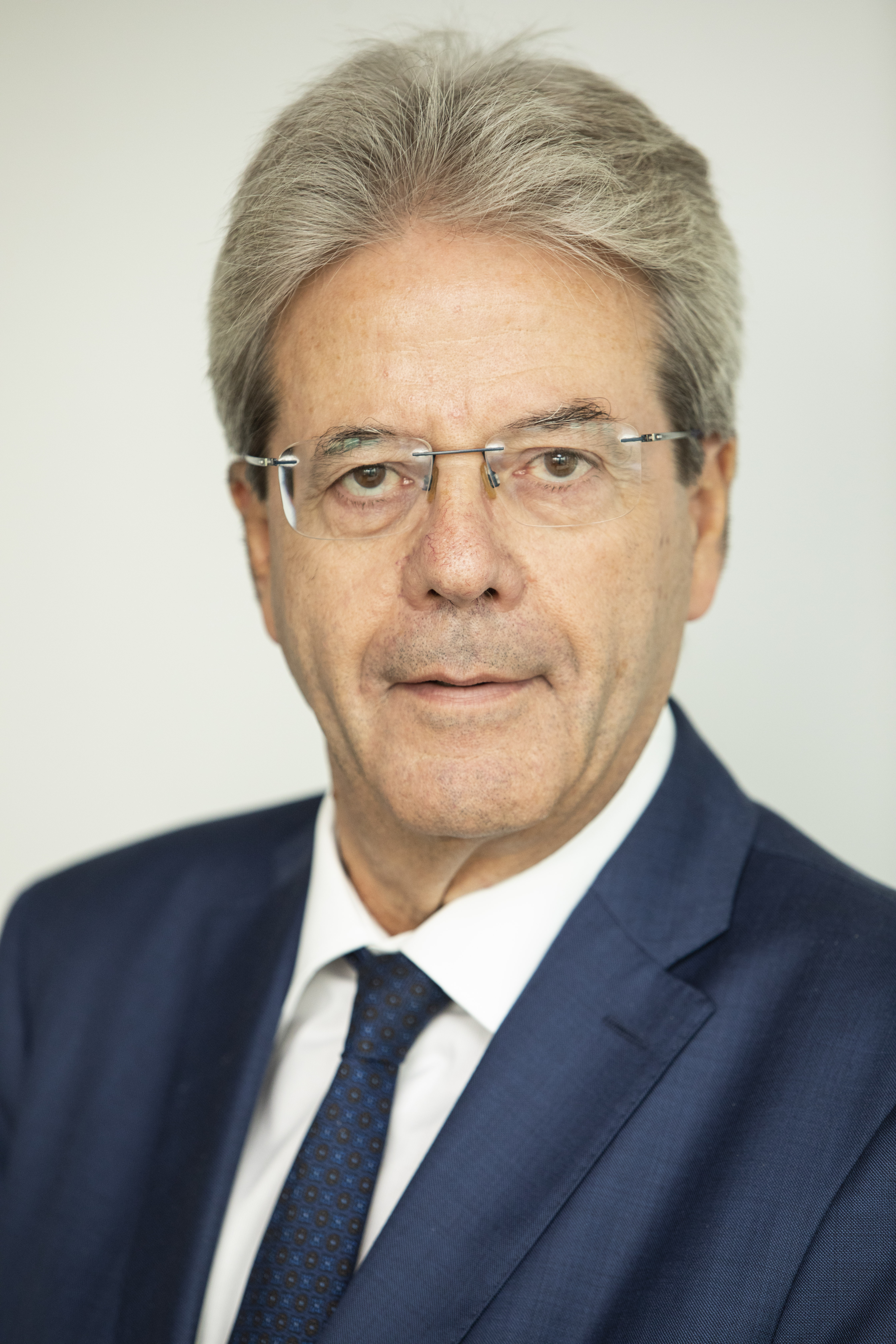
Paolo Gentiloni
2016–2018
22 November 1954 (age 71)

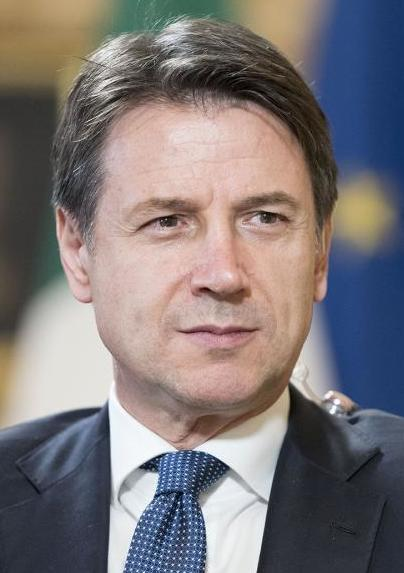
Giuseppe Conte
2018–2021
8 August 1964 (age 62)

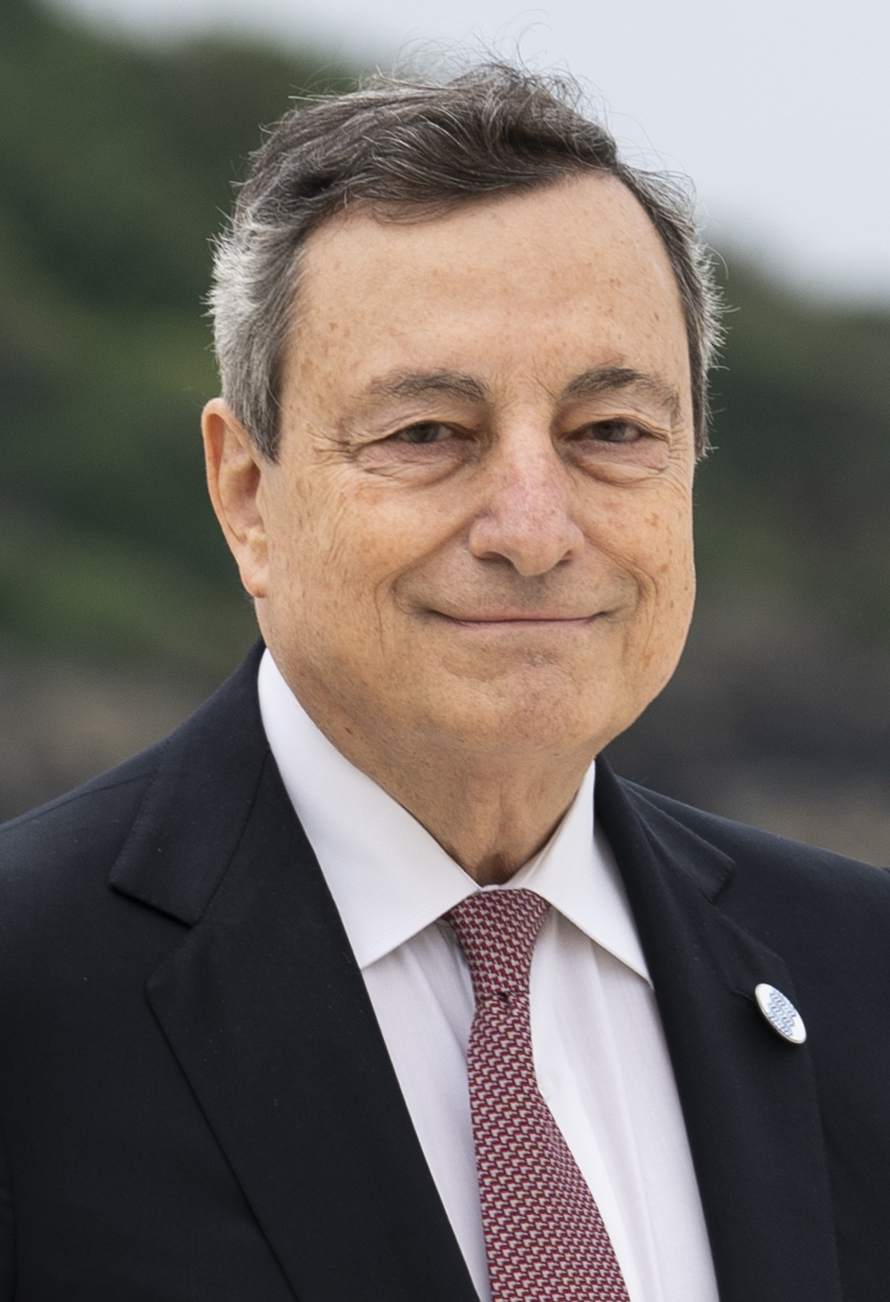
Mario Draghi
2021–2022
3 September 1947 (age 79)

== See also ==
- Deputy Prime Minister of Italy
- List of international trips made by prime ministers of Italy
- List of prime ministers of Italy by time in office
