= EU Med Group =

Euroregion, alliance of nine Southern European Union states

EUMED Group EuroMed 9
- Map of Europe indicating the member countries of the Med Group
- Membership: Croatia (joined 2021); Cyprus; France; Greece; Italy; Malta; Portugal; Slovenia (joined 2021); Spain
- Establishment: 17 December 2013

Area
  - Total: 1,756,859 km^{2} (678,327 sq mi)

Population
  - 2026 estimate: ▲207,031,754
  - Density: 118/km^{2} (305.6/sq mi)
- GDP (PPP): 2026 estimate
  - Total: ▲$13.18 trillion (4th)
  - Per capita: ▲$63,651
- GDP (nominal): 2026 estimate
  - Total: ▲$9.30 trillion (3rd)
  - Per capita: ▲$44,918

EU Med, EuroMed 9, or MED9 (formerly MED7; from EUrope Mediterranean), which is also referred to as "Club Med" and "Med Group", is an alliance of nine Mediterranean and Southern European Union member states: Croatia, Cyprus, France, Greece, Italy, Malta, Portugal, Slovenia and Spain. They are part of the Mediterranean Basin. All nine countries are states of the European Union, part of the eurozone (euro currency), and all except Cyprus are part of the unbounded Schengen Area.

== History ==
The Group was informally established on 17 December 2013 in Brussels at the initiative of the Foreign Ministers of Cyprus and Spain in order to create coordination on issues of common interest within the EU.

It was decided that the group would hold an annual meeting at the ministerial level. The first ministerial meeting was to take place in Greece in 2014, during Greece's presidency of the Council, but instead took place on 14 April in Alicante.

The second meeting took place in February 2015 in Paris. The 3rd Ministerial Meeting of the Mediterranean Group took place in Cyprus in February 2016 which was also attended by the Secretary General of the Union for the Mediterranean (UfM), Fathallah Sijilmassi. The Foreign Ministers discussed security and stability issues in North Africa and the Middle East as well as the handling of the migration crisis.

The Group held its 1st Southern EU countries' Summit on 9 September 2016 at the Zappeion Palace in Athens. Following the summit, the Athens Declaration was issued calling for investment to tackle youth unemployment and support growth, as well as stronger EU cooperation on issues of security and migration. The next summit is scheduled to take place in Spain, at the Royal Palace of El Pardo.

The seventh meeting was made on 10 September 2020 in Porticcio, Corsica, and concerned Turkey's concurrent unilateral activities in the eastern Mediterranean.

In 2021 it was announced during the Prime Minister Janez Janša's visit to Greece that Slovenia will join the group with a support of France, Spain and Greece.

Croatia and Slovenia first attended 17 September 2021 Athens meeting.

== Members ==
Arms	Flag	State	Capital	Code	Population (2024)	Area	Population density	GDP (nominal) US$ million	Head of Government
Coat of arms of Croatia	Flag of Croatia	Croatia	Zagreb	HR	3,876,002	56,594 km^{2} (21,851 sq mi)	68/km^{2} (180/sq mi)	115,915	Andrej Plenković
Coat of arms of Cyprus	Flag of Cyprus	Cyprus	Nicosia	CY	996,571	9,251 km^{2} (3,572 sq mi)	108/km^{2} (280/sq mi)	45,171	Nikos Christodoulides
Coat of arms of France	Flag of France	France	Paris	FR	69,112,309	640,679 km^{2} (247,368 sq mi)	108/km^{2} (280/sq mi)	3,554,155	Sébastien Lecornu
Coat of arms of Greece	Flag of Greece	Greece	Athens	GR	10,366,586	131,990 km^{2} (50,960 sq mi)	79/km^{2} (200/sq mi)	304,627	Kyriakos Mitsotakis
Coat of arms of Italy	Flag of Italy	Italy	Rome	IT	58,942,828	301,338 km^{2} (116,347 sq mi)	196/km^{2} (510/sq mi)	2,701,737	Giorgia Meloni
Coat of arms of Malta	Flag of Malta	Malta	Valletta	MT	588,254	316 km^{2} (122 sq mi)	1,862/km^{2} (4,820/sq mi)	30,712	Robert Abela
Coat of arms of Portugal	Flag of Portugal	Portugal	Lisbon	PT	11,424,031	92,390 km^{2} (35,670 sq mi)	124/km^{2} (320/sq mi)	375,197	Luís Montenegro
Coat of arms of Slovenia	Flag of Slovenia	Slovenia	Ljubljana	SI	2,135,107	20,271 km^{2} (7,827 sq mi)	105/km^{2} (270/sq mi)	86,732	Janez Janša
Coat of arms of Spain	Flag of Spain	Spain	Madrid	ES	49,590,099	504,030 km^{2} (194,610 sq mi)	98/km^{2} (250/sq mi)	2,085,276	Pedro Sánchez
9 total					207,031,764	1,756,859 km^{2} (678,327 sq mi)	118/km^{2} (310/sq mi)	9,299,522	

== Summits ==
- 9 September 2016 in Athens, Greece
- 28 January 2017 in Lisbon, Portugal
- 10 April 2017 in Madrid, Spain
- 10 January 2018 in Rome, Italy
- 29 January 2019 in Nicosia, Cyprus
- 14 June 2019 in Valletta, Malta
- 10 September 2020 in Porticcio (Corsica), France
- 17 September 2021 in Athens, Greece
- 9 December 2022 in Alicante, Spain
- 29 September 2023 in Mdina, Malta
- 11 October 2024 in Paphos, Cyprus
- 20 October 2025 in Portorož, Slovenia
- 7 October 2026 in Split, Croatia

== See also ==
- Craiova Group
- Open Balkan
- Three Seas Initiative
- European integration
- Multi-speed Europe
- New Hanseatic League
- Organisation of the Black Sea Economic Cooperation
- Visegrád Group
