= List of international presidential trips made by Vjosa Osmani =

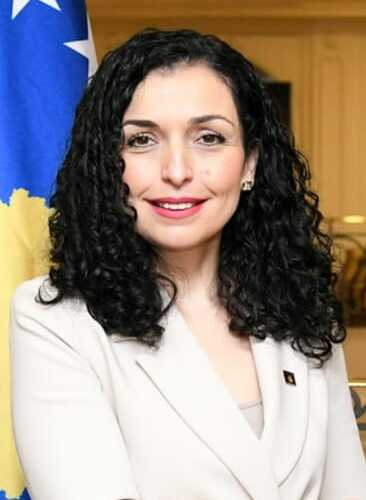
Vjosa Osmani is a former president of Kosovo between 2021 to 2026.

The number of visits per country where President Osmani traveled are:

- One visit to The Bahamas, Brunei, Colombia, Costa Rica, El Salvador, Estonia, Greece, Iceland, Latvia, Lithuania, Luxembourg, Malta, Malaysia, Moldova, Panama, Saudi Arabia, Spain, Thailand and Tunisia.
- Two visits to Canada, Belgium, Denmark, Finland, Hungary, Poland, Portugal, Singapore, United Arab Emirates and the United Kingdom.
- Three visits to Bulgaria, Croatia, Czech Republic, Italy, Japan and Slovenia.
- Four visits to Montenegro, North Macedonia, Qatar Switzerland and Vatican City
- Five visits to Austria.
- Six visits to France and Turkey.
- Eight visits to Albania and Germany.
- Seventeen visits to the United States.

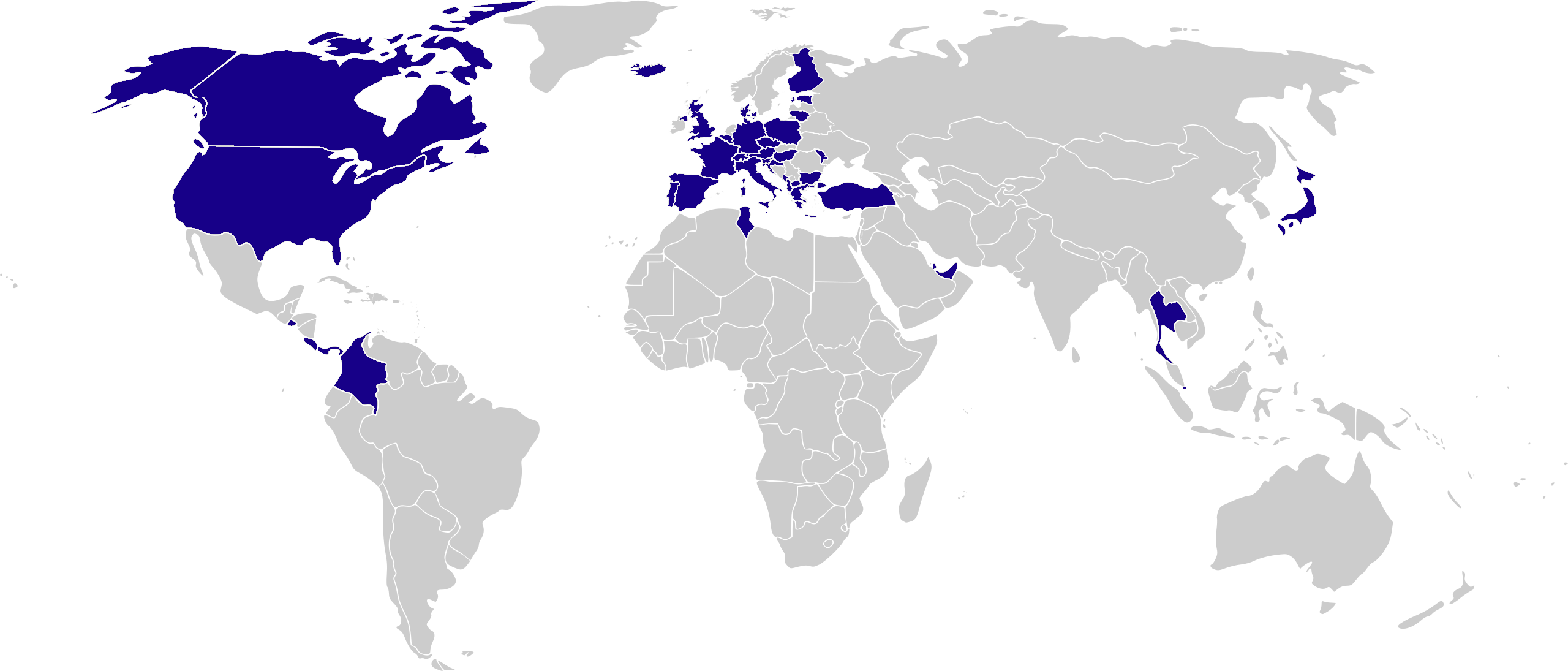
World map highlighting countries visited by Vjosa Osmani-Sadriu as president

== List ==
No.	Country	Date	Cities visited	Type of visit	Rf.
1	Albania	17 December 2020	Tirana	Official visit (Note: As acting president)	
2	Belgium	12–13 January 2021	Brussels	Official visit	
3	Switzerland	2–5 March 2021	Bern	Official visit	
4	Slovenia	17 May 2021	Kranj	Brdo-Brijuni Process	
5	Estonia	10–11 June 2021	Tallinn	Official visit	
6	Turkey	17–18 June 2021	Antalya	SEECP Summit	
7	Austria	22 June 2021	Vienna	Official visit	
8	Japan	23 July 2021	Tokyo	2020 Summer Olympics opening ceremony	
9	Switzerland	1 September 2021	Interlaken	Swiss Economic Forum	
10	Germany	14 September 2021	Berlin	Official visit	
11	United States	19–25 September 2021	New York City	Working visit	
12	United States	15–16 October 2021	New York City	United Nations Security Council Meeting	
13	Portugal	28–29 October 2021	Lisbon	Official visit	
14	Canada	19–24 November 2021	Ottawa and Halifax	Official visit	
15	Germany	18 February 2022	Munich	Munich Security Conference	
16	Turkey	26 February–1 March 2022	Ankara and Istanbul	Official visit	
17	Malta	2–3 March 2022	Valletta	Official visit	
18	Turkey	11–13 March 2022	Antalya	Antalya Diplomacy Forum	
19	Qatar	25–29 March 2022	Doha	Official visit	
20	United States	26–30 April 2022	Washington, D.C.	Funeral ceremony of Madeleine Albright	
21	Panama	4–6 May 2022	Panama City	Official visit	
22	Costa Rica	7–9 May 2022	San José	Inauguration of President Rodrigo Chaves Robles	
23	United States	10–11 May 2022	Washington, D.C.	Munich Leaders Meetings	
24	Lithuania	12–13 May 2022	Vilnius	Official visit	
25	Greece	10–11 June 2022	Athens	SEECP Summit	
26	North Macedonia	16–17 June 2022	Skopje and Lake Prespa	Official visit and Prespa Forum Dialogue	
27	Belgium	23 June 2022	Brussels	EU-Western Balkans Summit	
28	Thailand	24–26 June 2022	Bangkok	Official visit	
29	Singapore	27–28 June 2022	Singapore	Official visit	
30	Slovenia	4–5 July 2022	Ljubljana	Official visit	
31	Albania	24 July 2022	Tirana	Inauguration of President Bajram Begaj	
32	United States	25–27 July 2022	Washington, D.C.	Working visit	
33	Czech Republic	30 August – 2 September 2022	Prague	Official visit	
34	Slovenia	12 September 2022	Kranj	Brdo-Brijuni Process	
35	Germany	15 September 2022	Potsdam	Working visit	
36	United Kingdom	19 September 2022	London	State funeral of Elizabeth II	
37	United States	20–27 September 2022	New York City	Official visit	
38	Czech Republic	6–7 October 2022	Prague	1st European Political Community Summit	
39	France	10 November 2022	Paris	Paris Peace Forum	
40	Austria	16 November 2022	Vienna	Official visit	
41	Tunisia	19–20 November 2022	Djerba	OIF Summit	
42	Bulgaria	30 November–1 December 2022	Sofia	Official visit	
43	Albania	6 December 2022	Tirana	2022 EU-Western Balkans summit	
44	Vatican City	23 January 2023	Vatican City	Official visit	
45	Italy	23 January 2023	Rome	Official visit	
46	Iceland	2–3 February 2023	Reykjavík	Working visit	
47	Montenegro	7 February 2023	Podgorica	Official visit	
48	Germany	18 February 2023	Munich	Munich Security Conference	
49	Italy	11 April 2023	Frascineto, Catanzaro and Cosenza	Working visit	
50	North Macedonia	26 April 2023	Skopje	Official visit	
51	United Kingdom	5–6 May 2023	London	Coronation of King Charles III	
52	Montenegro	20 May 2023	Podgorica	Inauguration of President Jakov Milatović	
53	Moldova	1 June 2023	Chișinău	2nd European Political Community Summit	
54	Turkey	3 June 2023	Ankara	Inauguration of President Recep Tayyip Erdoğan	
55	France	14 June 2023	Strasbourg	The plenary session of the European Parliament	
56	Luxembourg	15 June 2023	Luxembourg	Official visit	
57	Germany	16 June 2023	Berlin	Working visit	
58	Montenegro	27 June 2023	Podgorica	SEECP Summit	
59	Austria	27 August 2023	Alpbach	2023 European Forum Alpbach	
60	Albania	5–6 September 2023	Tirana	Official visit	
61	North Macedonia	11 September 2023	Skopje	Brdo-Brijuni Process	
62	United States	17–23 September 2023	New York City	Working visit	
63	Spain	5 October 2023	Granada	3rd European Political Community Summit	
64	Croatia	10 October 2023	Zagreb	Official visit	
65	United States	23 October 2023	New York City and Des Moines	Working visit	
66	Singapore	6 November 2023	Singapore	Working visit	
67	Finland	9 November 2023	Helsinki	Funeral ceremony of Martti Ahtisaari	
68	Portugal	15 November 2023	Lisbon	Working visit	
69	United Arab Emirates	2–4 December 2023	Dubai	Working visit	
70	Turkey	8 December 2023	Istanbul	Working visit	
71	Qatar	10–11 December 2023	Doha	Doha Forum	
72	Belgium	13 December 2023	Brussels	EU–Western Balkan Summit	
73	Qatar	25–27 February 2024	Doha	Working visit	
74	Albania	28 February 2024	Tirana	Ukraine–Southeast Europe Summit	
75	Turkey	1 March 2024	Antalya	Antalya Diplomacy Forum	
76	United States	6–9 May 2024	Dallas	2024 US-Africa Business Summit	
77	Denmark	14–15 May 2024	Copenhagen	Copenhagen Democracy Summit 2024	
78	Bulgaria	18 May 2024	Sofia	Clinton Global Initiative	
79	El Salvador	31 May–1 June 2024	San Salvador	Inauguration of President Nayib Bukele	
80	North Macedonia	13 June 2024	Skopje	SEECP Summit 2024	
81	Switzerland	15–16 June 2024	Lucerne	June 2024 Ukraine peace summit	
82	Italy	28 June 2024	Bellagio	Global Women Leaders Summit	
83	United States	9–11 July 2024	Washington, D.C.	NATO Women, Peace and Security (WPS)	
84	United Kingdom	18 July 2024	Woodstock	4th European Political Community Summit	
85	France	26 July–1 August 2024	Paris	2024 Summer Olympics opening ceremony	
86	Croatia	4 August 2024	Sinj	Working visit	
87	Austria	26 August 2024	Alpbach	2024 European Forum Alpbach	
88	Czech Republic	30 August 2024	Prague	Globsec Forum	
89	Poland	11 September 2024	Warsaw	Vital Voices Summit	
90	Germany	12 September 2024	Potsdam	M100 Sanssouci Colloquium	
91	United States	20–26 September 2024	New York City	Working visit	
92	Germany	2 October 2024	Berlin	Official visit	
93	France	4–5 October 2024	Villers-Cotterêts	OIF Summit 2024	
94	Montenegro	7 October 2024	Tivat	Brdo-Brijuni Process	
95	Croatia	9 October 2024	Dubrovnik	Ukraine-Southeast Europe Summit	
96	United States	18–23 October 2024	New York City	Working visit	
97	Qatar	30–31 October 2024	Doha	Working visit	
98	Hungary	7 November 2024	Budapest	5th European Political Community Summit	
99	Canada	23–24 November 2024	Halifax	Working visit	
100	Colombia	26–27 November 2024	Bogotá	Official visit	
101	Belgium	4–5 December 2024	Brussels	Official visit	
102	France	7 December 2024	Paris	Reopening of Notre-Dame de Paris	
103	United States	12–14 December 2024	Washington, D.C.	Working visit	
104	Belgium	18 December 2024	Brussels	EU-Western Balkan Summit	
105	Poland	27 January 2025	Auschwitz	80th Anniversary / Auschwitz-Birkenau	
106	United States	6 February 2025	Washington D.C.	Working visit	
107	France	11 February 2025	Paris	AI Action Summit 2025	
108	Germany	14 February 2025	Munich	61st Munich Security Conference	
109	Bulgaria	4 April 2025	Sofia	Aqaba Process	
110	Turkey	11 April 2025	Antalya	Antalya Diplomacy Forum 2025	
111	Finland	23 April 2025	Helsinki	Official visit	
112	Vatican City	26 April 2025	Vatican City	Death and funeral of Pope Francis	
113	Malaysia	1–3 May 2025	Kuala Lumpur	Official visit	
114	Brunei	4–5 May 2025	Bandar Seri Begawan	Official visit	
115	Austria	11–12 May 2025	Mauthausen	Working visit	
116	Albania	16 May 2025	Tirana	6th European Political Community Summit	
117	Vatican City	17 May 2025	Vatican City	Papal inauguration of Pope Leo XIV	
118	Switzerland	21–22 May 2025	Bern & Geneva	Official visit	
119	United States	24–27 May 2025	Dayton	Working visit	
120	Japan	10–14 June 2025	Tokyo & Osaka	Official visit	
121	Albania	16 June 2025	Tirana	SEECP Summit 2025	
122	Hungary	17 June 2025	Budapest	Official visit	
123	United States	11–14 July 2025	Washington D.C	Working visit	
124	Latvia	14–15 July 2025	Riga	Working visit	
125	United States	21–30 September 2025	New York City	Working visit	
126	Denmark	2 October 2025	Copenhagen	7th European Political Community Summit	
127	Albania	6 October 2025	Durrës	Brdo-Brijuni Process	
128	Slovenia	13 October 2025	Ljubljana	Working visit	
129	Saudi Arabia	28 October 2025	Riyadh	Working visit	
130	Vatican City	12 December 2025	Vatican City	Official visit	
131	Belgium	16 December 2025	Brussels	EU-Western Balkan Summit	
132	Bahamas	19 December 2025	Nassau	Official visit	
133	Switzerland	22 January 2026	Davos	Board of Peace	
134	United Arab Emirates	3 February 2026	Abu Dhabi	World Governments Summit	
135	United States	19 February 2026	Washington, D.C.	Board of Peace	

== Multilateral meetings ==
Multilateral meetings of the following intergovernmental organizations took place during Vjosa Osmani's presidency (2021–2026).

Group	Year				
Group	2021	2022	2023	2024	2025
UNGA	19–25 September, (United States) New York City	20–27 September, (United States) New York City	17–23 September, (United States) New York City	20–26 September, (United States) New York City	21–26 September, (United States) New York City
EPC	Didn't exist	6 October, (Czech Republic) Prague	1 June, (Moldova) Bulboaca	18 July, (United Kingdom) Woodstock	16 May, (Albania) Tirana
EPC	Didn't exist	6 October, (Czech Republic) Prague	5 October, (Spain) Granada	7 November, (Hungary) Budapest	2 October, (Denmark) Copenhagen
SEECP	17–18 June, (Turkey) Antalya	10–11 June, (Greece) Athens	27 June, (Montenegro) Podgorica	13 June, (North Macedonia) Skopje	16 June, (Albania) Tirana
OIF	none	19–20 November, (Tunisia) Djerba	none	4–5 October, (France) Villers-Cotterêts	none
BBP	17 May, (Slovenia) Kranj	12–13 September, (Slovenia) Brdo pri Kranju	11 September, (North Macedonia) Skopje	8 October (Montenegro) Tivat	6 October (Albania) Durrës
Others	23 July, (Japan) Tokyo	none	Coronation of King Charles III and Queen Camilla; 5–6 May, (United Kingdom) London	Global Peace Summit; 15–16 June (Switzerland) Lucerne	26 April, Vatican City
██ = Future event

== See also ==
- Politics of Kosovo
- Foreign relations of Kosovo
- International recognition of Kosovo
