= List of international presidential trips made by Jakov Milatović =

This is a list of international presidential trips made by Jakov Milatović, the current President of Montenegro since 20 May 2023.

== Summary ==
The number of visits per country where President Milatović travelled are:

- One visit to Armenia, Estonia, Greece, Ireland, Japan, Lithuania, Moldova, the Netherlands, Spain, Slovenia, Ukraine, the United Kingdom
- Two visits to Albania, Croatia, North Macedonia, Poland and Vatican City
- Three visits to the United States
- Four visits to France

== 2023 ==
Country	Areas visited	Date(s)	Details
Moldova	Chișinău, Bulboaca	1 June	Milatović attended the 2nd European Political Community Summit.
Lithuania	Vilnius	11–12 July	Milatović attended the 2023 NATO summit.
Greece	Athens	21 August	Attended Ukraine-South East Europe summit. Met with Ukrainian president Volodymyr Zelenskyy in Athens, stating that Montenegro "openly and strongly condemns Russia's unprovoked aggression against Ukraine."
North Macedonia	Skopje	11 September	Attended Brdo-Brijuni Process.
United States	New York City	21 September	Milatović attended the 78th session of the United Nations General Assembly.
Spain	Granada	5–6 October	Milatović attended the 3rd European Political Community Summit.
Slovenia	Ljubljana	7 November	Met with Prime Minister Robert Golob.
France	Paris	9 November	Met with President Emmanuel Macron at the Élysée Palace.

== 2024 ==
Country	Areas visited	Date(s)	Details
Vatican City	Vatican City	7 March	Met with Pope Francis.
Switzerland	Nidwalden	15 June	Milatović attended the Summit on Peace in Ukraine at the Bürgenstock Resort.
United States	Washington, D.C.	10–11 July	Milatović attended the 2024 NATO summit
United Kingdom	Woodstock	18 July	Milatović attended the 4th European Political Community Summit.
Croatia	Dubrovnik	9 October	Addressed the third Ukraine-South East Europe summit.
France	Paris	29 October	Met with President Emmanuel Macron at the Élysée Palace.
Hungary	Budapest	7 November	Milatović attended the 5th European Political Community Summit.

== 2025 ==
Country	Areas visited	Date(s)	Details
Poland	Oświęcim	26–27 January	Milatović attended the commemoration of the 80th anniversary of the liberation of the Auschwitz concentration camp.
Vatican City	Vatican City	26 April	Milatović attended the funeral of Pope Francis.
Poland	Warsaw	28-29 April	Milatović participated in the Three Seas Initiative Summit.
Albania	Tirana	16–17 May	Milatović attended the 6th European Political Community Summit.
Ukraine	Odesa	11 June	Attended the fourth Ukraine-South East Europe summit.
Netherlands	The Hague	24–26 June	Milatović attended the 2025 NATO summit.
United States	New York City	25 September	Milatović attended the 80th session of the United Nations General Assembly.
Denmark	Copenhagen	1–2 October	Milatović attended the 7th European Political Community Summit.
Albania	Durrës	6 October	Attended Brdo-Brijuni Process.
France	Paris	29–30 October	Attended Paris Peace Forum.

== 2026 ==
Country	Areas visited	Date(s)	Details
Ireland	Dublin	25 February	Met with Taoiseach Micheál Martin.
North Macedonia	Skopje	31 March	Met with President Gordana Siljanovska-Davkova. They discussed the Macedonian-Montenegrin political relations, economic cooperation, education, digitalization, culture and tourism, as well as regional, European and international developments.
Japan	Tokyo	22 April	Met with Prime Minister Sanae Takaichi on the occasion of his first visit to Japan in this commemorative year marking the 20th anniversary of the establishment of diplomatic relations between the two countries. The discussions also covered Montenegro’s European Union accession process and Japan’s continued support under the Western Balkans Cooperation Initiative. The leaders further exchanged views on regional and international issues, including the situations in Ukraine, the Middle East, and security developments in the Indo-Pacific region, while emphasizing cooperation in maintaining a rules-based international order.
Croatia	Dubrovnik	28–29 April	Attended the 11th Three Seas Initiative summit.
Armenia	Yerevan	3–4 May	Milatović attended the 8th European Political Community Summit.
Estonia	Tallinn	15–16 May	Milatović paid an official visit, where he held talks with President Alar Karis, Prime Minister Kristen Michal, and Speaker of Parliament Lauri Hussar. Discussions focused on strengthening bilateral relations, political and economic cooperation, digital transformation, cybersecurity, and Estonia's support for Montenegro's accession to the European Union. The leaders also exchanged views on regional security, support for Ukraine, societal resilience, and broader European issues. Milatović emphasized Montenegro’s commitment to reforms and thanked Estonia for its continued support of the country's European integration process.
France	Paris	14 July	Milatović attended Bastille Day celebrations.
United States	New York City	21-23 September	Milatović attend the 81th United Nations General Assembly.

== Future trips ==
Country	Location	Date	Details
Hungary	Budapest	22-23 October	Milatović is plan to attend the 70th Anniversary Commemoration Ceremony Hungarian Revolution of 1956.
North Macedonia	TBD	October	Milatović is scheduled to attend the Brdo-Brijuni Process summit.
Ireland	Dublin	12 November	Milatović is plan to attend the 9th European Political Community Summit.
Cambodia	Phnom Penh	15–16 November	Milatović is scheduled to attend the 20th Organisation internationale de la Francophonie summit.
Turkey	Antalya	November	Milatović is scheduled to attend the 2026 United Nations Climate Change Conference.

== Multilateral meetings ==
participated in the following summits during his presidency:

Group	Year				
Group	2023	2024	2025	2026	2027
UNGA	21 September, (United States) New York City	27 September, (United States) New York City	25 September, (United States) New York City	TBD, (United States) New York City	
NATO	11–12 July, (Lithuania) Vilnius	9–11 July, (United States) Washington, D.C.	24–25 June, (Netherlands) The Hague	7–8 July, (Turkey) Ankara	TBD, (Albania) Tirana
EPC	1 June, (Moldova) Bulboaca	18 July, (United Kingdom) Woodstock	16 May, (Albania) Tirana	4 May, (Armenia) Yerevan	TBD, (Switzerland) TBD
EPC	5 October, (Spain) Granada	7 November, (Hungary) Budapest	2 October, (Denmark) Copenhagen	12 November, (Republic of Ireland) Dublin	TBD, (Greece) TBD
BBP	11 September, (North Macedonia) Skopje	8 October (Montenegro) Tivat	6 October (Albania) Durrës		
Others	None	Global Peace Summit; 15–16 June (Switzerland) Lucerne	Three Seas Initiative; 28–29 April, (Poland) Warsaw	Three Seas Initiative; 28–29 April, (Croatia) Dubrovnik	
Future event Did not attend or participate
