= List of international prime ministerial trips made by Alexander De Croo =

This is a list of international prime ministerial trips made by Alexander De Croo, who served as the Prime Minister of Belgium from 1 October 2020 to 3 February 2025.

== Summary ==
De Croo has visited 20 countries during his tenure as prime minister. The number of visits per country where De Croo has traveled are:

- One visit to Albania, Czech Republic, Egypt, Estonia, Hungary, Iceland, Israel, Lithuania, Luxembourg, Moldova, Palestine, Slovenia and Switzerland
- Two visits to the Netherlands, Poland, Spain and Ukraine
- Three visits to the United Kingdom
- Five visits to France and Germany
- Six visits to the United States

== 2020 ==
Country	Location(s)	Dates	Details
France	Paris	1 December	Met with President Emmanuel Macron at the Élysée Palace. During the meeting they confirmed that they are regarding a strategy to combat the spread of the coronavirus between the two countries, especially during the holiday season. It was his first trip abroad as prime minister. At the end of October, he had to cancel his visit to his Dutch counterpart due to the coronavirus crisis.

== 2021 ==
Country	Location(s)	Dates	Details
United States	New York City	24 September	Attended the 76th United Nations General Assembly.
Slovenia	Ljubljana	5–6 October	De Croo attended an informal European Council and the EU-Western Balkans summit.
United Kingdom	Glasgow	1–2 November	De Croo travelled to Glasgow to attend the 2021 United Nations Climate Change Conference.

== 2022 ==
Country	Location(s)	Dates	Details
Estonia	Tallinn	9 February	Travelled to Tallinn to strengthen bilateral ties and reinforce NATO security. He met with Estonian prime minister Kaja Kallas, notably visiting the Ämari Air Base to review Belgian F-16 fighter planes supporting the Baltic Air Policing mission.
Germany	Munich	18–20 February	Attended the 58th Munich Security Conference.
Germany	Berlin	9–10 May	Bilateral meeting with the president Frank-Walter Steinmeier at Schloss Bellevue. In Europe Day he give a lecture on Europe at the invitation of the Friedrich-Naumann-Foundation for Freedom (A Fight for Freedom - How Putin's War Renews Europe). Met with Chancellor Olaf Scholz. Their topics such as the Russian attack on Ukraine, the security situation in Europe, and other European and international issues.
Netherlands	The Hague	14 June	Met with Prime Minister of Portugal Antonio Costa, NATO secretary general Jens Stoltenberg, Prime Minister Mark Rutte, Prime Minister of Denmark Mette Frederiksen, Prime Minister of Latvia Krišjānis Kariņš and Prime Minister of Poland Mateusz Morawiecki on the Catshuis after a meeting in preparation for the NATO summit in Madrid. The discussions include the Russian invasion of Ukraine
Spain	Madrid	28–30 June	De Croo travelled to Madrid to attend the 32nd NATO summit.
United States	New York City	23 September	Attended the 77th United Nations General Assembly.
Czech Republic	Prague	6–7 October	De Croo attended at Prague Castle the 1st European Political Community Summit and an informal European Council.
Egypt	Sharm el-Sheikh	8 November	De Croo travelled to Sharm el-Sheikh to attend the 2022 United Nations Climate Change Conference.
Ukraine	Kyiv	26 November	He, foreign minister Hadja Lahbib, Lithuanian prime minister Ingrida Šimonytė, Hungarian president Katalin Novak and Polish prime minister Mateusz Morawiecki visited Ukraine, meeting Ukrainian president Volodymyr Zelenskyy and pledging continued Belgian support to Ukraine.
Luxembourg	Luxembourg City	28 November	De Croo attended the Benelux Summit.
Albania	Tirana	6 December	De Croo attended the EU-Western Balkans summit

== 2023 ==
Country	Location(s)	Dates	Details
Germany	Munich	17–19 February	Attended the 59th Munich Security Conference.
Netherlands	The Hague	4 May	Met with Prime Minister Mark Rutte and Ukrainian president Volodymyr Zelenskyy at the Catshuis.
Iceland	Reykjavík	16–17 May	De Croo attended the 4th Council of Europe summit.
Moldova	Chișinău, Bulboaca	1 June	De Croo attended the second summit of the European Political Community.
Lithuania	Vilnius	11–12 July	De Croo travelled to Vilnius to attend the 33rd NATO summit.
United States	New York City	20 September	Attended the 78th United Nations General Assembly.
Spain	Granada	5–6 October	De Croo attended the third summit of the European Political Community.
Germany	Berlin	13 November	De Croo met with Chancellor Olaf Scholz and President of the European Council Charles Michel during a Strategic Agenda consultation at the German Chancellery. The meeting was also attended by Austrian chancellor Karl Nehammer, Greek prime minister Kyriakos Mitsotakis, President of Cyprus Nikos Christodoulides, Hungarian prime minister Viktor Orbán, and President of Lithuania Gitanas Nausėda. The leaders discussed priorities for the European Union's next institutional cycle, including security and defence, competitiveness, energy, migration, enlargement, and institutional reforms.
Israel	Jerusalem	23 November	Meeting with the president Isaac Herzog and the prime minister Benjamin Netanyahu
Palestine	Ramallah	23 November	Meeting with the president Mahmoud Abbas

== 2024 ==
Country	Location(s)	Dates	Details
France	Paris	5 January	De Croo attended the commemoration ceremony of Jacques Delors.
United Kingdom	London	23–24 January	Met with Prime Minister Rishi Sunak in 10 Downing Street. On next day he spoke at the London School of Economics (LSE), emphasizing shared history and future with the UK.
Germany	Munich	16–18 February	Attended the 60th Munich Security Conference.
Poland	Warsaw	23 February	Together with president of the European Commission Ursula von der Leyen travelled to Warsaw to meet with Polish prime minister Donald Tusk. The discussions focused on reinforcing the rule of law, strengthening EU-Polish relations, and addressing security issues related to the war in Ukraine.
Ukraine	Kyiv	24 February	De Croo made the unannounced visit to Kyiv to take part in a display of international solidarity to mark the second anniversary of the Russian invasion of Ukraine, together with European Commission president Ursula von der Leyen, Canadian prime minister Justin Trudeau, and Italian prime minister Giorgia Meloni.
France	Paris	26 February	De Croo travelled to Paris, where Emmanuel Macron was holding an emergency summit over the situation in Ukraine, as they had just suffered the loss of Avdiivka.
United States	Washington, D.C.	31 May	holds a bilateral meeting with President Joe Biden at the White House.
Switzerland	Lucerne	15–16 June	De Croo travelled to Nidwalden to attend the Global peace summit.
United States	Washington, D.C.	9–11 July	De Croo attended the 34th NATO summit.
United Kingdom	Woodstock	18 July	De Croo attended the fourth summit of the European Political Community.
France	Paris	26 July	De Croo travelled to Paris to attend the 2024 Summer Olympics opening ceremony.
United States	New York City	24 September	Attended the 79th United Nations General Assembly.
France	Villers-Cotterêts	3–5 October	De Croo travelled to Villers-Cotterêts to attend the Organisation internationale de la Francophonie Summit.
Hungary	Budapest	7 November	De Croo attended the 5th European Political Community Summit.

== 2025 ==
Country	Location(s)	Dates	Details
Poland	Oświęcim	27 January	De Croo attended the commemoration of the 80th anniversary of the liberation of the Auschwitz concentration camp.

== Multilateral meetings ==
Alexander De Croo participated in the following summits during his premiership:

Group	Year			
Group	2021	2022	2023	2024
UNGA	24 September, (United States) New York City	23 September, (United States) New York City	20 September, (United States) New York City	24 September, (United States) New York City
ASEM	26 November, (virtual) (Cambodia) Phnom Penh	None	None	None
NATO	14 June, (Belgium) Brussels	24 March, (Belgium) Brussels	11–12 July, (Lithuania) Vilnius	9–11 July, (United States) Washington, D.C.
NATO	14 June, (Belgium) Brussels	28–30 June, (Spain) Madrid	11–12 July, (Lithuania) Vilnius	9–11 July, (United States) Washington, D.C.
EU–CELAC	None		17–18 July, (Belgium) Brussels	None
EPC	Didn't exist	6 October, (Czech Republic) Prague	1 June, (Moldova) Bulboaca	18 July, (United Kingdom) Woodstock
EPC	Didn't exist	6 October, (Czech Republic) Prague	5 October, (Spain) Granada	7 November, (Hungary) Budapest
OIF	none	19–20 November, (Tunisia) Djerba	none	4–5 October, (France) Villers-Cotterêts
UNCCC	1–2 November, (United Kingdom) Glasgow	8 November, (Egypt) Sharm el-Sheikh	30 November – 3 December, (United Arab Emirates) Dubai	12 November, (Azerbaijan) Baku
Others	None			Global Peace Summit; 15–16 June, (Switzerland) Lucerne
