= List of international presidential trips made by Aleksandar Vučić =

Aleksandar Vučić made numerous international trips in his capacity as the President of Serbia between his assumption of office in May 2017 and his resignation in September 2026.

== Summary ==
- One visit to Austria, Bahrain, Belarus, Croatia, Cuba, Denmark, Egypt, Finland, Greece, India, Kosovo, Montenegro, Moldova
- Two visits to Czech, Hungary, North Macedonia, Spain, Turkey, United Kingdom
- Three visits to Albania, France, Ukraine
- Four visits to Azerbaijan, Germany
- Six visits to China, Russia, United Arab Emirates
- Nine visits to Switzerland
- Eleven visits to the United States

== 2017 ==
Country	Location(s)	Dates	Details
Turkey	Istanbul	10 July	Vucic is attended the 22th World Petroleum Congress.
Greece	Thessaloniki	13 July	Vucic is official visit to the attended the 1st Serbia-Greece Supreme Cooperation Council.
United States	Washington D.C.	17 July	Met with U.S. vice president Mike Pence, where they discussed U.S. support for Accession of Serbia to the EU, the need for continued reforms, and further progress in normalizing the relationship with Kosovo.
United States	New York City	20-22 September	Vucic is attended the 72th United Nations General Assembly.
Cuba	Havana	13-15 December	State visit.
Russia	Moscow	19 December	Vučić made an official visit to the Russian Federation for the first time as the president of Serbia and met with President Vladimir Putin.

== 2018 ==
Country	Location(s)	Dates	Details
Kosovo	Mitrovica, Gračanica	20-21 January	Emergency visit to conflict zones.
Switzerland	Davos	23-26 January	Vucic is attended the Davos Forum.
Austria	Vienna	2 February	Official working visit.
Croatia	Zagreb	12-13 February	Official visit.
Russia	Moscow	8–9 May	Attended 2018 Moscow Victory Day Parade
Azerbaijan	Baku	21-22 May	Official state visit.
China	Beijing, Tianjin	16-19 September	Vucic is attended the 2018 Summer Davos Forum(The Divine Spirits Banquet).
United States	New York City	25-27 September	Vucic is attended the 73th United Nations General Assembly.
Russia	Moscow	2 October	official visit.
Finland	Helsinki	7–8 November	Attended EPP Helsinki Congress.

== 2019 ==
Country	Location(s)	Dates	Details
Switzerland	Davos	22-24 January	Vucic is attended the Davos Forum.
China	Beijing	24-27 April	Vucic is attended to the 2th Belt and Road Initiative Forum.
Germany	Berlin	29 April	Vucic is attended the Berlin Mini Summit in the Western Balkans.
Belarus	Minsk	21-22 June	Vucic is attended the opening ceremony of the 2nd Minsk European Games.
United States	New York City	24-26 September	Vucic is attended the 74th United Nations General Assembly.
Switzerland	Geneva	8 November	Vucic is attended a one-day schedule for the 'Western Balkan Leaders Summit' hosted by the World Economic Forum.
North Macedonia	Ohrid	9-10 November	Vucic is attended the Western Balkan Mini Schengen Summit.
Russia	Sochi	4 December	Official visit.

== 2020 ==
Country	Location(s)	Dates	Details
Switzerland	Davos	21-23 January	Vucic is attended the Davos Forum.
United States	Washington D.C.	1-4 March	Vucic is attended the AIPAC Annual Meeting.
Germany	Berlin	15 March	Working visit.
Russia	Moscow	23-24 June	Vucic is attended the 75th Anniversary Moscow Victory Day.
United States	Washington D.C.	1–5 September	2020 Kosovo–Serbia agreement
Belgium	Brussels	7 September	Vucic is to attended the Immediately after visiting Washington, he moved to Brussels for the main meeting of the Kosovo-Serbia peace dialogue hosted by the EU.

== 2021 ==
Country	Location(s)	Dates	Details
France	Paris	1 February	Vučić held a working visit with President Emmanuel Macron, discussing Belgrade–Pristina relations and Serbia's European path.
United Arab Emirates	Abu-Dhabi	11-12 March	Working visit.
Bahrain	Manama	12-14 March	Official visit.
Czech Republic	Prague	18–19 May	Official visit; Vučić met with President Miloš Zeman and was awarded the Order of the White Lion.
Hungary	Budapest	23 September	Attended the 4th Budapest Demographic Summit.
United Kingdom	Glasgow	1–3 November	Attended the 2021 United Nations Climate Change Conference(COP26).
Russia	Sochi	25 November	Met with President Vladimir Putin.
Albania	Tirana	20–21 December	Attended an Open Balkan meeting amid protests called by opposition figure Sali Berisha.

== 2022 ==
Country	Location(s)	Dates	Details
China	Beijing	4-6 February	Vucic is attended the 2022 Beijing Winter Olympics Opening Ceremony.
Spain	Madrid	23 February	Met with Prime Minister Pedro Sánchez at the La Moncloa Palace.
Germany	Berlin	4 May	Vučić met with Kosovo's Prime Minister Albin Kurti in the third time for an informal meeting hosted by Chancellor Olaf Scholz and facilitated by EU envoy Miroslav Lajčák. The talks focused on the continuation of the Belgrade–Pristina dialogue, including unresolved issues such as license plates and broader normalization efforts.
Switzerland	Davos	24-26 May	Vucic is attended the Davos Forum.
United Arab Emirates	Abu-Dhabi	11-12 September	Official visit.
United States	New York City	20-22 September	Vucic is attended the 77th United Nations General Assembly.
Czech Republic	Prague	7 October	Vučić attended at Prague Castle the 1st European Political Community Summit
Egypt	Sharm El Sheikh	November	Vucic is attended the 2022 United Nations Climate Change Conference(COP27).
Albania	Tirana	6 December	Attended the EU-Western Balkans summit.
Azerbaijan	Baku	20-21 December	Working visit.

== 2023 ==
Country	Location(s)	Dates	Details
Switzerland	Davos	17-20 January	Vucic is attended the Davos Forum.
Germany	Munich	17–19 February	Attended the 59th Munich Security Conference.
United Arab Emirates	Abu-Dhabi	19-22 February	Vucic is attended the 2023 Abu Dhabi International Defense Exhibition(IDEX 2023).
North Macedonia	Ohrid	18 March	Belgrade–Pristina negotiations
Moldova	Bulboaca	1 June	Vučić attended the second summit of the European Political Community.
United States	New York City	19-22 September	Vucic is attended the 78th United Nations General Assembly.
Spain	Granada	5–6 October	Vučić attended the 3rd European Political Community Summit
China	Beijing	16-18 October	Attended the 3th Belt and Road Initiative Forum.
United Arab Emirates	Dubai	1-2 December	Vucic is attended the 2023 United Nations Climate Change Conference(COP28).

== 2024 ==
Country	Location(s)	Dates	Details
Switzerland	Davos	16-19 January	Vucic is attended the Davos Forum.
France	Paris	8-9 April	Official state visit.
United Kingdom	Woodstock	18 July	Vučić attended the 4th European Political Community Summit
France	Paris	26 July	Vučić travelled to Paris to attend the 2024 Summer Olympics opening ceremony.
United States	New York City	17-22 September	Vucic is attended the 79th United Nations General Assembly.
Hungary	Budapest	7 November	Vučić attended the 5th European Political Community Summit
Azerbaijan	Baku	11-13 November	Vucic is attended the 2024 United Nations Climate Change Conference(COP30).

== 2025 ==
Country	Location(s)	Dates	Details
Switzerland	Davos	20-24 January	Vucic is attended the Davos Forum.
Russia	Moscow	8–9 May	Attended 2025 Moscow Victory Day Parade
Albania	Tirana	16 May	Vučić attended the 6th European Political Community Summit.
Ukraine	Odessa	11 June	Vucic attended the Ukraine-Southeast Europe summit.
China	Beijing	3 September	Attended the 2025 China Victory Day Parade.
United States	New York City	23-25 September	Vucic is attended the 80th United Nations General Assembly.
Denmark	Copenhagen	1–2 October	Vučić attended the 7th European Political Community Summit.

== 2026 ==
Country	Location(s)	Dates	Details
United Arab Emirates	Abu-Dhabi	14 January	Vucic is attended the Abu Dhabi Sustainability Week.
Switzerland	Davos	January 19-23	Vucic is attended the Davos Forum.
Turkey	Ankara	10 February	Working visit.
India	New Delhi	17–20 February	Attended AI Impact Summit.
Kazakhstan	Astana	26 February	Official visit.
United Arab Emirates	Abu-Dhabi	22 March	Working visit.
Azerbaijan	Baku	17-18 May	Vucic is attended the 13th World Urban Forum.
China	Beijing, Jiaxing	24-28 May	Official state visit.
Montenegro	Tivat	4 June	Vucic is attended the 2026 EU-Western Balkans Summit.
Ukraine	Kyiv	15 July	Attended the Ukraine-Southeast Europe summit.
Ukraine	Ivano-Frankivsk	18 September	Vucic is with Prime Minister of Poland Donald Tusk and President of Romania Nicușor Dan travelled the Carpathian Eight summit.
United States	New York City	22-25 September	Vucic is attended the 81th United Nations General Assembly.

== Multilateral meetings ==
Multilateral meetings of the following intergovernmental organizations took place during Aleksandar Vučić's presidency (2017–Present).

Group	Year									
Group	2017	2018	2019	2020	2021	2022	2023	2024	2025	2026
EPC	Didn't exist					6 October, (Czech Republic) Prague	1 June, (Moldova) Bulboaca	18 July, (United Kingdom) Woodstock	16 May, (Albania) Tirana	TBD, (Armenia) TBD
EPC	Didn't exist					6 October, (Czech Republic) Prague	5 October, (Spain) Granada	7 November, (Hungary) Budapest	2 October, (Denmark) Copenhagen	TBD, (Republic of Ireland) TBD
