= List of international prime ministerial trips made by Evika Siliņa =

This is a list of international prime ministerial trips made by Evika Siliņa, who served as the 24th prime minister of Latvia from 15 September 2023 to 28 May 2026.

== Summary ==
Siliņa has visited 19 countries during her tenure as prime minister. The number of visits per country where Siliņa has traveled are:

- One visit to Albania, Croatia, Cyprus, Italy, Norway, Poland, Spain, United Kingdom, United States and Vatican City
- Two visits to Sweden
- Three visits to Denmark, Finland, France, Lithuania and Ukraine
- Four visits to Estonia
- Five visits to Germany
- Fourteen visits to Belgium

== 2023 ==
Country	Location(s)	Dates	Details
Belgium	Brussels	27 September	Siliņa is paying a working visit to Brussels, where she meets with President of the European Commission Ursula von der Leyen and NATO Secretary General Jens Stoltenberg.
Spain	Granada	5 October	Attended 3rd European Political Community Summit.
Sweden	Visby	12–13 October	Siliņa attended the 2023 Joint Expeditionary Force summit.
Estonia	Tallinn	8 November	Held a working visit with Prime Minister Kaja Kallas to reinforce Baltic cooperation on defense, energy, transport, and support for Ukraine.
Denmark	Copenhagen	14 November	Siliņa travelled to Copenhagen to meet with prime ministers Mette Frederiksen (Denmark), Petteri Orpo (Finland), Leo Varadkar (Ireland), Nikolay Denkov (Bulgaria) and Ulf Kristersson (Sweden).
Finland	Helsinki	24 November	Met with President Sauli Niinistö at Mäntyniemi. They discussed security, migration and the relations between Finland and Latvia. During her visit, Siliņa will also meet with Prime Minister Petteri Orpo.
Belgium	Brussels	13–15 December	Siliņa attended the EU-Western Balkans summit followed by the European Council.

== 2024 ==
Country	Location(s)	Dates	Details
Germany	Munich	16–18 February	Attended 60th Munich Security Conference
Poland	Warsaw	29 February	Siliņa is in Poland February 29 with an agenda that includes a meeting with her Polish counterpart, Donald Tusk. During her visit, Siliņa also laid flowers at the Tomb of the Unknown Soldier in Warsaw and met with the employees of the Latvian Embassy in Poland.
United States	New York City	11–14 March	Siliņa is spending most of this week in the United States on a working visit, where she will participate in the 68th session of the United Nations (UN) Commission on the Status of Women, and meet with UN director-general António Guterres and high-ranking US officials.
Belgium	Brussels	21 March	Siliņa attended the European Council summit.
Germany	Berlin	27 March	Met with Chancellor Olaf Scholz to discuss NATO and Baltic regional security, economic cooperation, EU agenda, and support for Ukraine.
Sweden	Stockholm	25–27 April	Siliņa visited Stockholm and held a meeting with Swedish prime minister Ulf Kristersson. The visit focused on NATO defense, deployment of Swedish mechanized units to Latvia, military-industrial cooperation, and discussions with Swedish industry (e.g., Saab) and diaspora. They discussed the countries’ bilateral cooperation and current security issues, such as the continued support to Ukraine and cooperation in NATO, including Sweden's contribution to NATO’s enhanced presence in Latvia. She also met with representatives of Swedish businesses, including in the defence industry, and visit Gothenburg with a business delegation.
Lithuania	Vilnius	13 May	Met with Estonian prime minister Kaja Kallas and Lithuanian prime minister Ingrida Šimonytė. Siliņa took part in the BalticCouncil of Ministers Prime Ministers meeting in Vilnius and Ambassador of the Republic of Latvia Solveiga Silkalna participated as part of the delegation. Prime Ministers of Latvia, Lithuania and Estonia discussed the issues related to the security and defence, Russia's aggression in Ukraine, joint infrastructure projects of the Baltic States, as well as current issues of the European Union's agenda. "The borders of the Baltic States are the borders of NATO and the European Union, therefore, the development of the deterrence and defense capabilities of Latvia, Lithuania and Estonia is essential for the entire Alliance and the EU. Latvia will continue to make investments to strengthen its borders within the framework of the common Baltic defense line project and combat capabilities, which is very important for the EU and NATO." This was emphasized by Prime Minister of Latvia Evika Siliņa during the meeting.
Belgium	Brussels	17 June	Siliņa attended an informal European Council summit.
Belgium	Brussels	27 June	Siliņa arrives to European Council Meeting in Brussels. EU leaders gathered to discuss the bloc's 2024-2029 strategic agenda, as well as issues pertaining to Ukraine, the Middle East, security and defence, competitiveness, among other items.
United Kingdom	Woodstock	18 July	Siliņa attended the 4th European Political Community Summit.
Lithuania	Klaipėda, Palanga	17–18 August	Met with Estonian prime minister Kristen Michal and Lithuanian prime minister Ingrida Šimonytė. During their meeting, the heads of government focused mainly on strengthening regional security, but also discussed cooperation in the transport and energy sectors, support for Ukraine, and the tightening of sanctions against Russia.
Ukraine	Kyiv	11 September	With Lithuanian president Gitanas Nausėda arrived in Kyiv on the morning.
France	Cessy	1 October	Siliņa attended the 70th-anniversary celebrations of the European Organization for Nuclear Research (CERN) in Cessy, France, near Geneva. During this visit, she toured the Compact Muon Solenoid (CMS) cavern and the Large Hadron Collider (LHC) tunnel. This event was significant as it marked a milestone in scientific collaboration and innovation.
Belgium	Brussels	16 October	Siliņa met with NATO Secretary General Mark Rutte, to discuss further strengthening NATO's defences and NATO's continued support to Ukraine.
Hungary	Budapest	7 November	Siliņa attended the 5th European Political Community Summit.
Lithuania	Vilnius	22 November	Met with Estonian prime minister Kristen Michal and Lithuanian prime minister Ingrida Šimonytė. They discussed the protection of critical maritime infrastructure, countering hybrid threats, continued support for Ukraine, and joint energy and transport projects.
Estonia	Tallinn	16–17 December	Siliņa attended the 2024 Joint Expeditionary Force summit.

== 2025 ==
Country	Location(s)	Dates	Details
Germany	Berlin	17–18 January	Attended the EPP Leaders’ Retreat. She also met with leader of the opposition and leader of the Christian Democratic Union, Friedrich Merz.
Belgium	Brussels	3 February	Siliņa arrives for an informal EU leaders' retreat at the Palais d'Egmont.
Germany	Munich	14–16 February	Attended 61st Munich Security Conference
Belgium	Brussels	20 March	Participation in the European Council working session.
France	Paris	27 March	Siliņa attended a meeting of the "Coalition of the willing" hosted by President Macron.
Norway	Oslo	9 May	Siliņa attended the 2025 Joint Expeditionary Force summit.
Albania	Tirana	16 May	Siliņa attended the 6th European Political Community Summit.
Vatican City	Vatican City	18 May	Siliņa attended Papal inauguration of Pope Leo XIV
Belgium	Brussels	26–27 June	Attended the European Council meeting.
Ukraine	Kyiv	15 July	Siliņa met with President Volodymyr Zelenskyy to discuss further defense support for Ukrainian warriors and Ukraine's path to European integration.
Estonia	Tartu	27 August	Siliņa with Estonian prime minister Kristen Michal will also hold a joint press conference.
Denmark	Copenhagen	3 September	Met with Prime Minister Mette Frederiksen, President Volodymyr Zelenskyy and other leaders. Attended the Nordic-Baltic Eight summit.
Denmark	Copenhagen	2 October	Attended the 7th European Political Community Summit.
Belgium	Brussels	23 October	Attended the 252nd European Council summit.
Finland	Helsinki	16 December	Met with Prime Minister Petteri Orpo, Swedish prime minister Ulf Kristersson, Estonian prime minister Kristen Michal, Lithuanian president Gitanas Nausėda, Polish prime minister Donald Tusk, Romanian president Nicușor Dan and Bulgarian prime minister Rosen Zhelyazkov at the Eastern Front Summit in Helsinki, where the discussion focused on Europe securing its Eastern Front at a faster pace and through joint initiatives.

== 2026 ==
Country	Location(s)	Dates	Details
France	Paris	6 January	Siliņa attended the Coalition of the Willing meeting in Paris with fellow leaders.
Belgium	Brussels	22 January	Attended an informal European Council summit.
Croatia	Zagreb	30–31 January	Attended the EPP Leaders’ Retreat.
Italy	Milan	6 February	Attended the 2026 Winter Olympics.
Belgium	Antwerp, Rijkhoven	11–12 February	Siliņa attended the 3rd European Industry Summit. Next day participated in the informal meeting of EU heads of state and government.
Germany	Munich	13–15 February	Attended 62nd Munich Security Conference.
Ukraine	Kyiv	24 February	Siliņa travelled to Kyiv to meet President Volodymyr Zelenskyy and join Nordic-Baltic leaders in the coalition of the willing to mark the fourth anniversary of Russia’s full-scale invasion.
Belgium	Brussels	25–26 February	Met with European Commission president Ursula von der Leyen, and Prime Minister Bart De Wever. At the high-level conference on the EU's eastern border countries in Brussels, met with European Council president António Costa, Estonian prime minister Kristen Michal and Lithuanian prime minister Inga Ruginienė, where she highlighted the central role of the countries in ensuring Europe's security, resilience and stability and highlighted the importance of the countries in ensuring their security, resilience and stability. At the end of the conference, a declaration of intent to establish the EastInvest Facility, a financing platform for the countries of the eastern border region, will be signed.
Belgium	Brussels	19–20 March	Siliņa attended the European Council.
Finland	Helsinki	26 March	Siliņa attended the 2026 Joint Expeditionary Force summit.
Estonia	Tallinn	17 April	Met with Prime Minister Kristen Michal and Lithuanian prime minister Inga Ruginienė. They discussed regional infrastructure projects before focusing on regional defence and security issues and international developments. A joint press conference will be held at 12.50.
Cyprus	Nicosia	23–24 April	Siliņa attended an informal meeting of the European Council summit.

== Multilateral meetings ==
Evika Siliņa participated in the following summits during her premiership:

Group	Year			
Group	2023	2024	2025	2026
EPC	5 October, (Spain) Granada	18 July, (United Kingdom) Woodstock	16 May, (Albania) Tirana	4 May, (Armenia) Yerevan
EPC	5 October, (Spain) Granada	7 November, (Hungary) Budapest	2 October, (Denmark) Copenhagen	
JEF	12–13 October, (Sweden) Visby	17 December, (Estonia) Tallinn	9 May, (Norway) Oslo	26 March, (Finland) Helsinki
Others	None		15 March, (videoconference); United Kingdom	Together for peace and security summit 6 January, (France) Paris
Others	None		Building a robust peace for Ukraine and Europe; 27 March, (France) Paris	Together for peace and security summit 6 January, (France) Paris
██ = Future event ██ = Did not attend / participate.
