= List of international prime ministerial trips made by Simon Harris =

This is a list of international prime ministerial trips made by Simon Harris, who served as the 16th Taoiseach from 9 April 2024 to 23 January 2025.

== Summary ==
The number of visits per country where he has travelled are:

- One visit to: Hungary, Poland, Switzerland, Ukraine
- Two visits to: the United Kingdom and the United States
- Four visits to: Belgium

== 2024 ==
#	Country	Location(s)	Dates	Details	Image
1	Belgium	Brussels	17–18 April	Harris attended an extraordinary European Council summit.	
2	Switzerland	Lucerne	15–16 June	Attended the Summit on Peace in Ukraine at the Bürgenstock Resort.	
3	Belgium	Brussels	17 June	Harris attended an informal European Council summit and European People's Party summit.	
4	Belgium	Brussels	27–28 June	Harris attended the European Council summit and European People's Party summit.	
5	United Kingdom	London, Woodstock	17–18 July	Met with Prime Minister Keir Starmer at Chequers. Attended the 4th European Political Community Summit at Blenheim Palace.	
6	Ukraine	Kyiv	4 September	First official visit to Ukraine. Met President Volodymyr Zelenskyy and signed a 10-year bilateral agreement on support and cooperation.	
6	Poland	Rzeszów	5 September	Met with Prime Minister Donald Tusk. They discussed issues related to Russian aggression against Ukraine and both countries' support for the authorities in Kyiv and the Ukrainian population.	
7	United States	New York City	22–26 September	Attended the 79th United Nations General Assembly and the Summit of the Future.	
8	United States	Washington, D. C.	9 October	Met with President Joe Biden.	
9	Belgium	Brussels	16–17 October	Harris attended the first EU-Gulf Cooperation Council summit and the European Council summit to discuss migration and the war in Ukraine.	
10	Hungary	Budapest	7–8 November	Attended the 5th European Political Community Summit and an informal European Council meeting.	
11	United Kingdom	Edinburgh	6 December	Met with Prime Minister Keir Starmer at the British-Irish Summit. The pair discussed the history of the Council, and its important origins in the historic Good Friday Agreement. They remarked on the valuable cooperation between the UK government, Irish government, devolved governments and crown dependencies - twenty-five years since its first meeting in December 1999. They also discussed legacy issues, including work to make progress to support communities and victims in Northern Ireland.	
