= Brdo-Brijuni Process =

Annual event

Brdo–Brijuni Process
- Participating non-EU states Participating EU states EU states guests
- Formation: July 25, 2013; 13 years ago (at the presidential level)
- Type: Diplomatic conference
- Members: EU states: Croatia; Slovenia; Non-EU states: Albania; Bosnia and Herzegovina; Kosovo; Montenegro; North Macedonia; Serbia; Guests: France (2013, 2021); Germany (2014, 2017); Austria (2015 I, 2015 II); USA (2015 II); EU (2015 II, 2018, 2019); Italy (2016); Bulgaria (2018); Poland (2019)
- Official language: None, de facto English

The Brdo–Brijuni Process (Slovene: Proces Brdo-Brioni, Croatian: Proces Brdo-Brijuni) is an annual multilateral event in the Western Balkans. It was initiated in 2013 by Slovenian president Borut Pahor and Croatian president Ivo Josipović. The first official meeting was in Brdo pri Kranju, Slovenia. The main focus of the Process is the enlargement of the European Union with countries of the Western Balkans. Similar meetings were held at the prime-ministerial level in 2010 and 2011 by then-Prime Ministers of Slovenia and Croatia, Borut Pahor and Jadranka Kosor. The Brdo–Brijuni process includes Slovenia and Croatia (EU member states) and candidates and potential candidates for EU membership from the Western Balkans (Serbia, Montenegro, Albania, North Macedonia, Bosnia and Herzegovina and Kosovo).

In 2014, the Berlin Process was initiated by then-Chancellor of Germany Angela Merkel, in which all of the Brdo–Brijuni Process countries are included as well.

== Current representatives ==
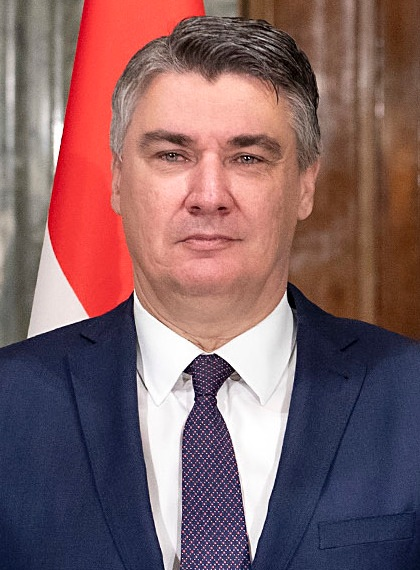
(Croatia) Croatia
Zoran Milanović
President

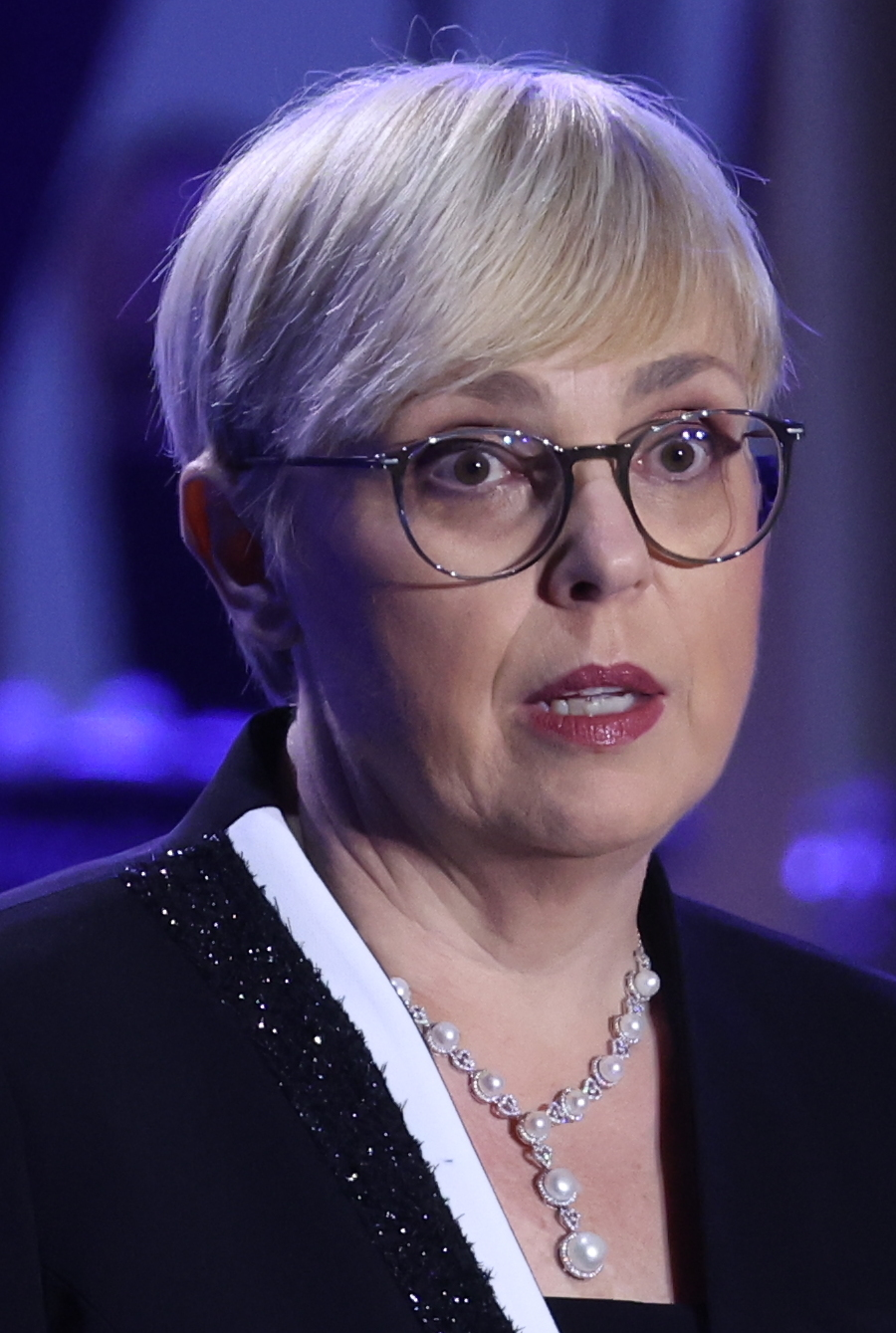
(Slovenia) Slovenia
Nataša Pirc Musar
President

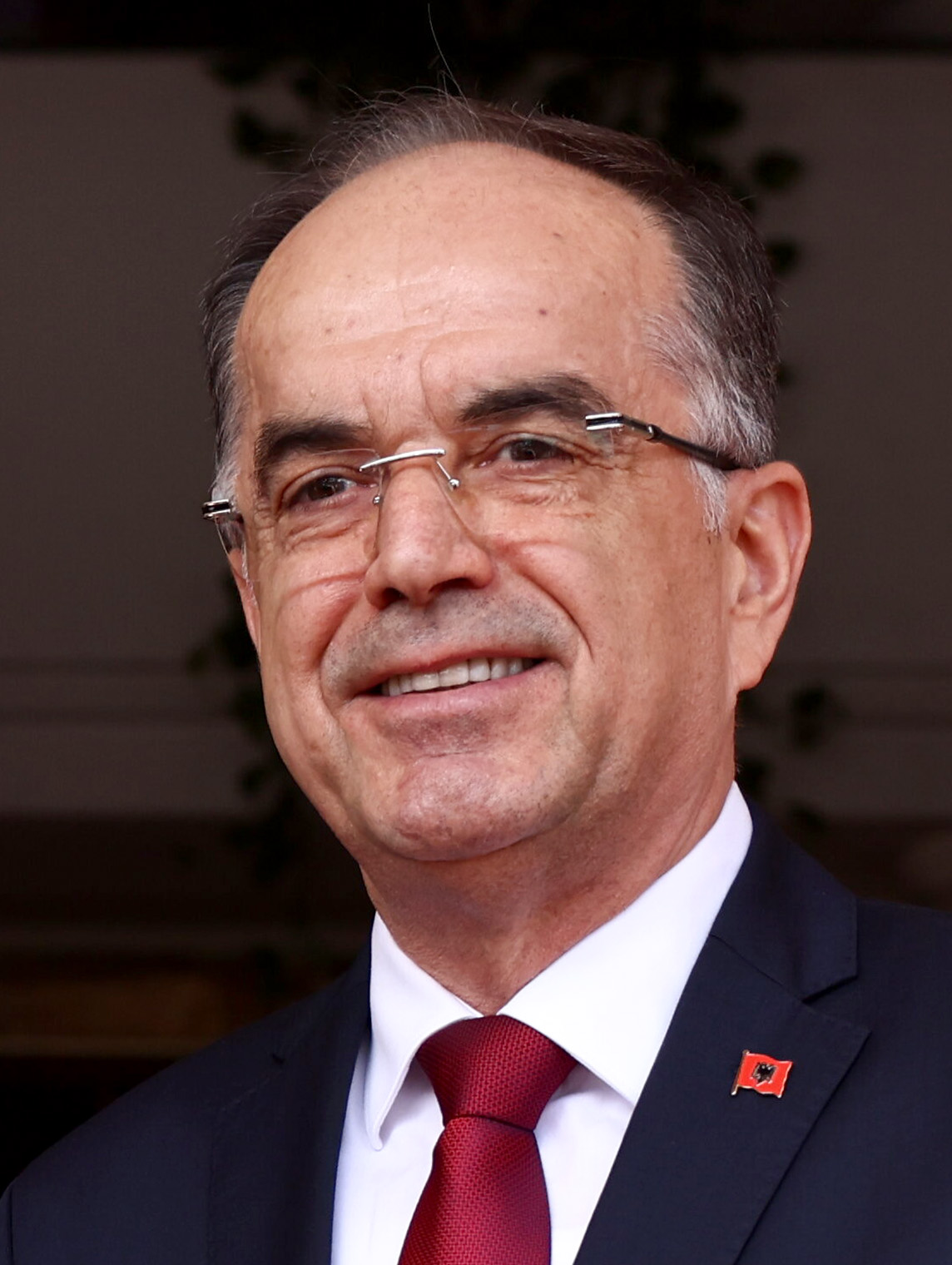
(Albania) Albania
Bajram Begaj
President

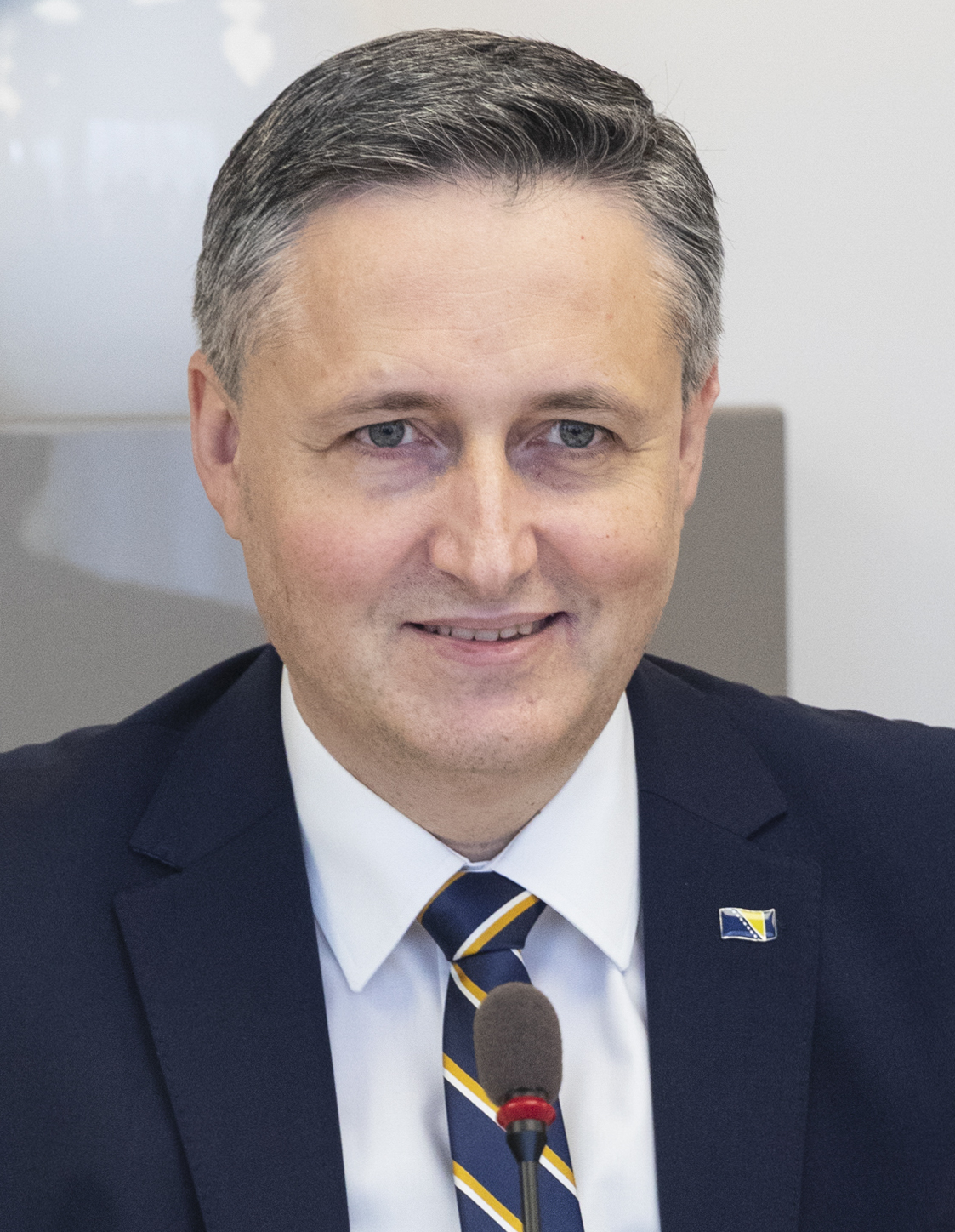
(Bosnia and Herzegovina) Bosnia and Herzegovina
Denis Bećirović
Chairman of the Presidency

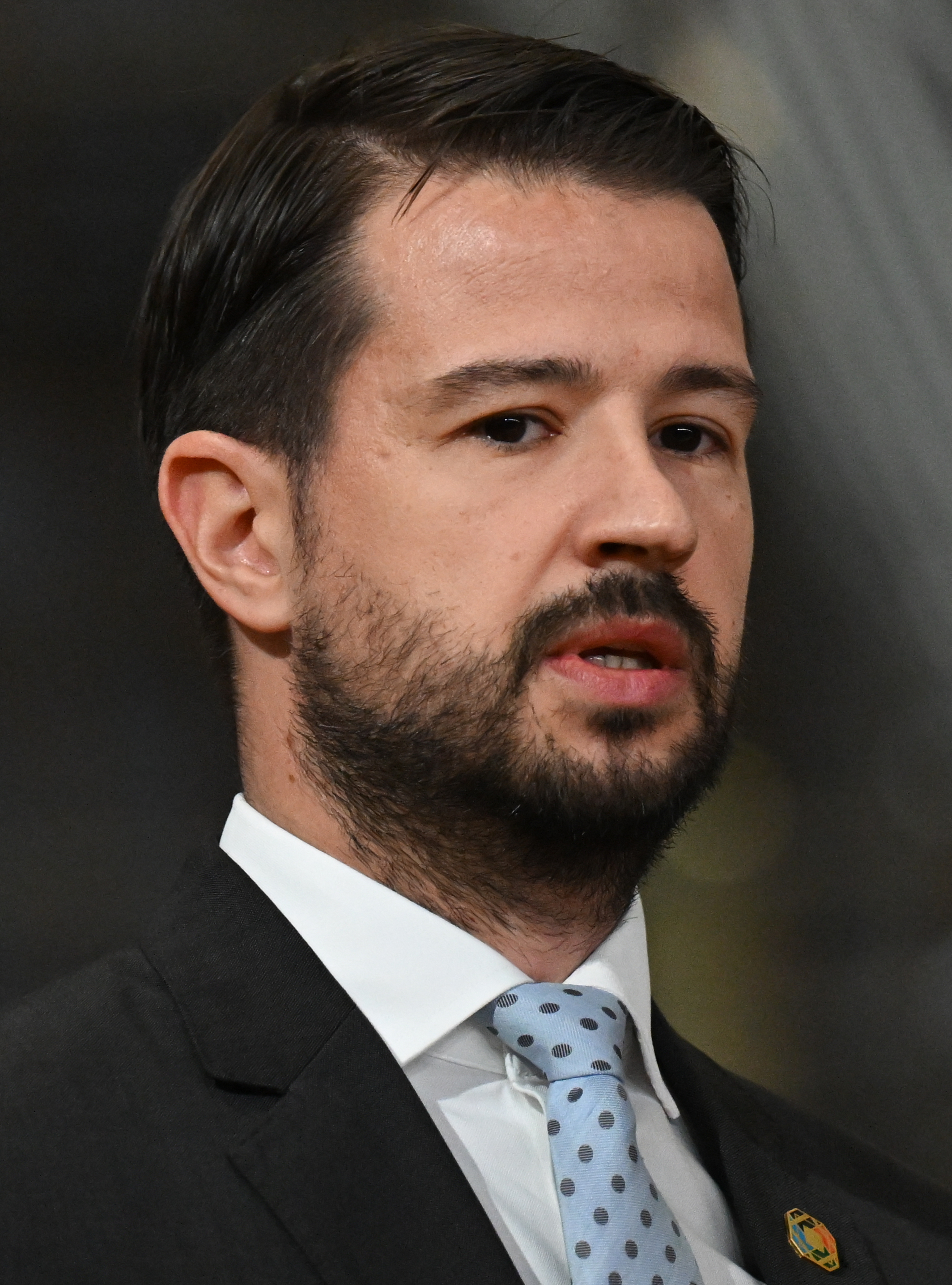
(Montenegro) Montenegro
Jakov Milatović
President

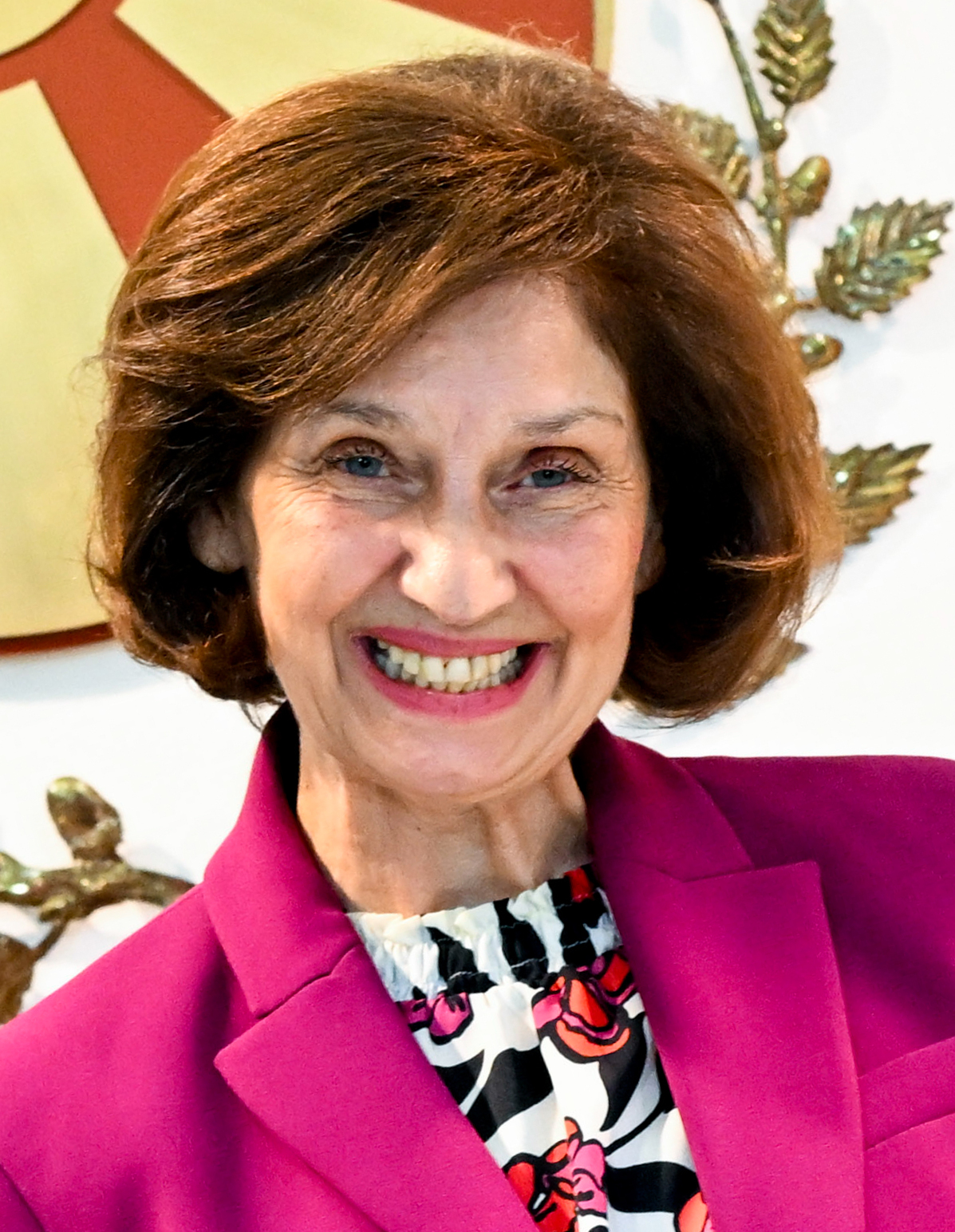
(North Macedonia) North Macedonia
Gordana Siljanovska-Davkova
President

(Serbia) Serbia
Ana Brnabić
President

== Meetings ==
Year	Host country	Host	Attendees	Guest(s)	Source
2013	Brdo pri Kranju, Slovenia 25 July 2013	(Slovenia) President Borut Pahor	(Croatia) President Ivo Josipović (Albania) President Bujar Nishani (Bosnia and Herzegovina) Chairman of the Presidency Željko Komšić (Kosovo) President Atifete Jahjaga (North Macedonia) President Gjorge Ivanov (Montenegro) President Filip Vujanović (Serbia) President Tomislav Nikolić	(France) President François Hollande	
2014	Dubrovnik, Croatia 15 July 2014	(Croatia) President Ivo Josipović	(Slovenia) President Borut Pahor (Albania) President Bujar Nishani (Bosnia and Herzegovina) Chairman of the Presidency Bakir Izetbegović (Bosnia and Herzegovina) Member of the Presidency Željko Komšić (Bosnia and Herzegovina) Member of the Presidency Nebojša Radmanović (Kosovo) President Atifete Jahjaga (North Macedonia) President Gjorge Ivanov (Montenegro) President Filip Vujanović (Serbia) President Tomislav Nikolić	(Germany) Federal Chancellor Angela Merkel	
2015	(Montenegro) Budva, Montenegro 8 June 2015	(Montenegro) President Filip Vujanović	(Slovenia) President Borut Pahor (Croatia) President Kolinda Grabar-Kitarović (Albania) President Bujar Nishani (Bosnia and Herzegovina) Chairman of the Presidency Mladen Ivanić (Kosovo) President Atifete Jahjaga (North Macedonia) President Gjorge Ivanov (Serbia) President Tomislav Nikolić	(Austria) President Heinz Fischer	
2015	Zagreb, Croatia 25 November 2015 Extraordinary meeting	(Croatia) President Kolinda Grabar-Kitarović	(Slovenia) President Borut Pahor (Albania) President Bujar Nishani (Bosnia and Herzegovina) Chairman of the Presidency Dragan Čović (Bosnia and Herzegovina) Member of the Presidency Bakir Izetbegović (Bosnia and Herzegovina) Member of the Presidency Mladen Ivanić (Kosovo) President Atifete Jahjaga (North Macedonia) President Gjorge Ivanov (Montenegro) President Filip Vujanović (Serbia) President Tomislav Nikolić	(Austria) President Heinz Fischer (United States) Vice President Joe Biden (European Union) President of the European Council Donald Tusk	
2016	Sarajevo, Bosnia and Herzegovina 28–29 May 2016	(Bosnia and Herzegovina) Chairman of the Presidency Bakir Izetbegović (Bosnia and Herzegovina) Member of the Presidency Mladen Ivanić (Bosnia and Herzegovina) Member of the Presidency Dragan Čović	(Slovenia) President Borut Pahor (Croatia) President Kolinda Grabar-Kitarović (Albania) President Bujar Nishani (Kosovo) President Hashim Thaçi (North Macedonia) President Gjorge Ivanov (Montenegro) President Filip Vujanović (Serbia) President Tomislav Nikolić	(Italy) President Sergio Mattarella	
2017	Brdo pri Kranju, Slovenia 3 June 2017	(Slovenia) President Borut Pahor	(Croatia) President Kolinda Grabar-Kitarović (Albania) President Bujar Nishani (Bosnia and Herzegovina) Member of the Presidency Dragan Čović (Kosovo) President Hashim Thaçi (Montenegro) President Filip Vujanović (Serbia) President Aleksandar Vučić	(Germany) President Frank-Walter Steinmeier	
2018	(North Macedonia) Skopje, Macedonia 27 April 2018	(North Macedonia) President Gjorge Ivanov	(Slovenia) President Borut Pahor (Croatia) President Kolinda Grabar-Kitarović (Albania) President Ilir Meta (Bosnia and Herzegovina) Chairman of the Presidency Bakir Izetbegović (Kosovo) President Hashim Thaçi (Montenegro) President Filip Vujanović (Serbia) President Aleksandar Vučić	(Bulgaria) Prime Minister Boyko Borisov (European Union) President of the European Council Donald Tusk	
2019	Tirana, Albania 8–9 May 2019	(Albania) President Ilir Meta	(Slovenia) President Borut Pahor (Croatia) President Kolinda Grabar-Kitarović (Bosnia and Herzegovina) Chairman of the Presidency Milorad Dodik (Bosnia and Herzegovina) Member of the Presidency Šefik Džaferović (Kosovo) President Hashim Thaçi (Montenegro) President Milo Đukanović (Serbia) President Aleksandar Vučić	(Poland) President Andrzej Duda (European Union) High Representative of the Union Federica Mogherini	
2021	(Slovenia) Brdo pri Kranju, Slovenia 29 June 2020 (Postponed); 17 May 2021	(Slovenia) President Borut Pahor	(Croatia) President Zoran Milanović (Albania) President Ilir Meta (Bosnia and Herzegovina) Chairman of the Presidency Milorad Dodik (Bosnia and Herzegovina) Member of the Presidency Šefik Džaferović (Bosnia and Herzegovina) Member of the Presidency Željko Komšić (Kosovo) President Vjosa Osmani (North Macedonia) President Stevo Pendarovski (Montenegro) President Milo Đukanović (Serbia) President Aleksandar Vučić	(France) President Emmanuel Macron (canceled due to schedule overlap – committed to attend future meeting)	
2022	(Slovenia) Brdo pri Kranju, Slovenia 12–13 September 2022	(Slovenia) President Borut Pahor	(Croatia) President Zoran Milanović (Albania) President Bajram Begaj (Bosnia and Herzegovina) Chairman of the Presidency Šefik Džaferović (Bosnia and Herzegovina) Member of the Presidency Milorad Dodik (Bosnia and Herzegovina) Member of the Presidency Željko Komšić (Kosovo) President Vjosa Osmani (North Macedonia) President Stevo Pendarovski (Montenegro) President Milo Đukanović (Serbia) President Aleksandar Vučić		
2023	Skopje, North Macedonia 11 September 2023	(North Macedonia) President Stevo Pendarovski	(Slovenia) President Nataša Pirc Musar (Croatia) President Zoran Milanović (Albania) President Bajram Begaj (Bosnia and Herzegovina) Chairman of the Presidency Željko Komšić (Bosnia and Herzegovina) Member of the Presidency Denis Bećirović (Bosnia and Herzegovina) Member of the Presidency Željka Cvijanović (Kosovo) President Vjosa Osmani (Montenegro) President Jakov Milatović (Serbia) President Aleksandar Vučić		
2024	Tivat, Montenegro 8 October 2024	(Montenegro) President Jakov Milatović	(Slovenia) President Nataša Pirc Musar (Croatia) President Zoran Milanović (Albania) President Bajram Begaj (Bosnia and Herzegovina) Chairman of the Presidency Denis Bećirović (Bosnia and Herzegovina) Member of the Presidency Željko Komšić (Bosnia and Herzegovina) Member of the Presidency Željka Cvijanović (Kosovo) President Vjosa Osmani (North Macedonia) President Gordana Siljanovska-Davkova (Serbia) President Aleksandar Vučić		
2025	Durrës, Albania 6 October 2025	(Albania) President Bajram Begaj	(Slovenia) President Nataša Pirc Musar (Croatia) President Zoran Milanović (Montenegro) President Jakov Milatović (Bosnia and Herzegovina) Chairman of the Presidency Željko Komšić (Bosnia and Herzegovina) Member of the Presidency Denis Bećirović (Bosnia and Herzegovina) Member of the Presidency Željka Cvijanović (Kosovo) President Vjosa Osmani (North Macedonia) President Gordana Siljanovska-Davkova (Serbia) President Aleksandar Vučić		

=== Meetings by host country ===
Country	Host	
(Slovenia) Slovenia	4	2013, 2017, 2021, 2022
Croatia	2	2014, 2015 II
(North Macedonia) North Macedonia	2	2018, 2023
(Montenegro) Montenegro	2	2015 I, 2024
Albania	2	2019, 2025
(Bosnia and Herzegovina) Bosnia and Herzegovina	1	2016

== See also ==
- Potential enlargement of the European Union
  - Accession of Albania to the European Union
  - Accession of Bosnia and Herzegovina to the European Union
  - Accession of Kosovo to the European Union
  - Accession of Montenegro to the European Union
  - Accession of North Macedonia to the European Union
  - Accession of Serbia to the European Union
- Berlin Process
- Belgrade–Pristina negotiations
- Southeast Europe Transport Community
- South-East European Cooperation Process
