= 3rd European Political Community Summit =

European Political Community Summit

3rd European Political Community Summit Tercera cumbre de la Comunidad Política Europea
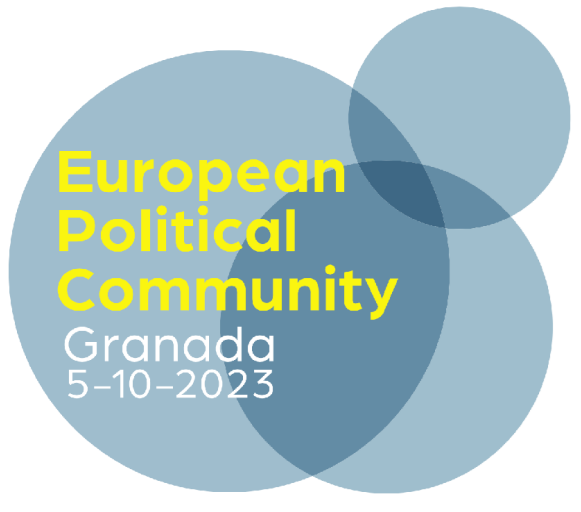

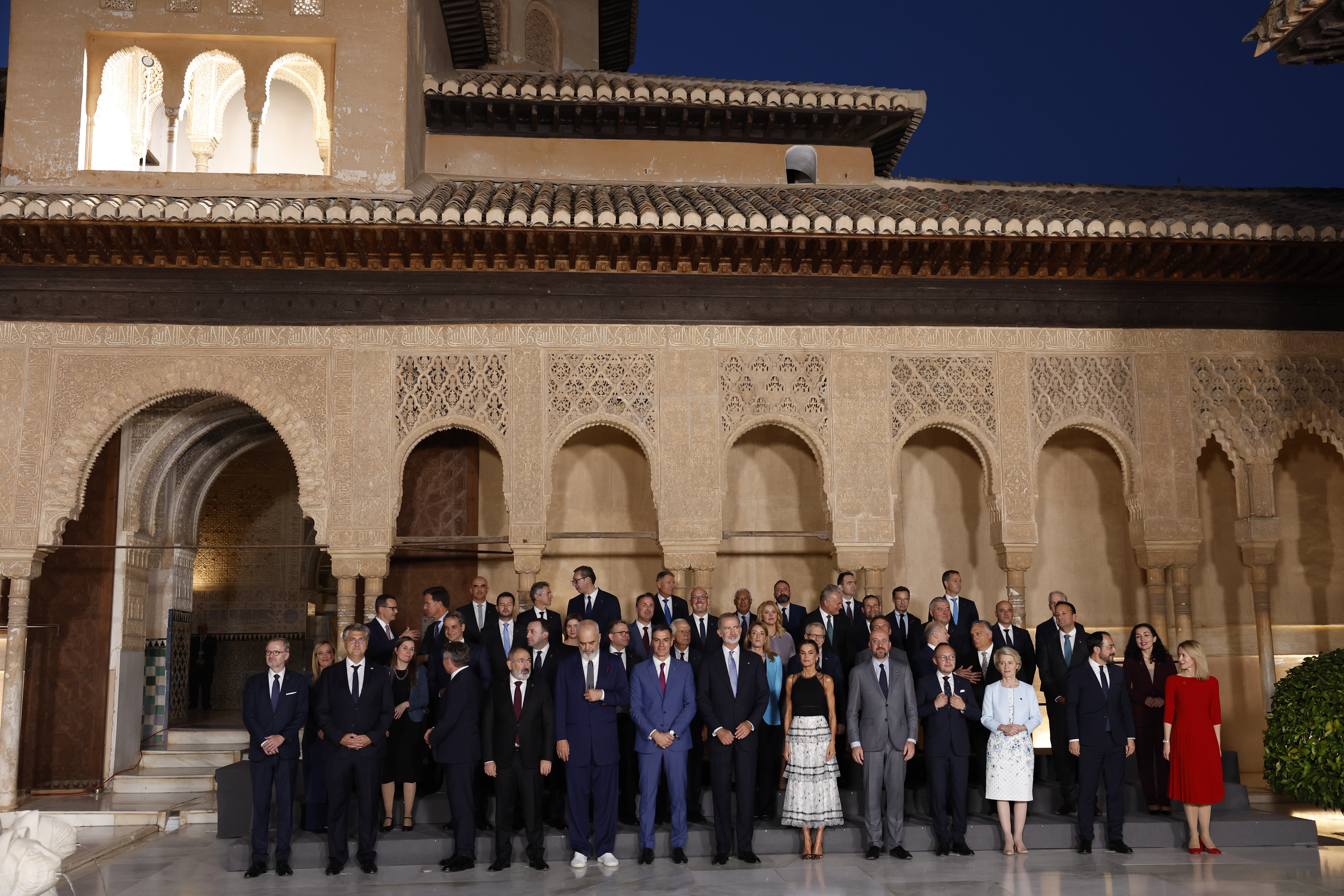
- Family photo with King Felipe VI and Queen Letizia at the Court of the Lions.
- Host country: Spain
- Date: 5 October 2023
- Cities: Granada
- Venues: Granada Conference Centre; Alhambra
- Participants: 45 states
- Chair: Pedro Sánchez, Prime Minister of Spain
- Follows: 2nd
- Precedes: 4th
- Website: 3rd European Political Community Summit

The Third European Political Community Summit was a meeting of the European Political Community held on 5 October 2023 at the Granada Conference Centre in Granada, Spain.

== Aims ==
As had been announced by the host, Spain, the main focus of the summit was intended to be on "the current conflicts affecting the continent, the aim being to take advantage of the attendance of most European leaders to re-establish their unity vis-à-vis Russia's aggression against Ukraine".

== Preparation ==
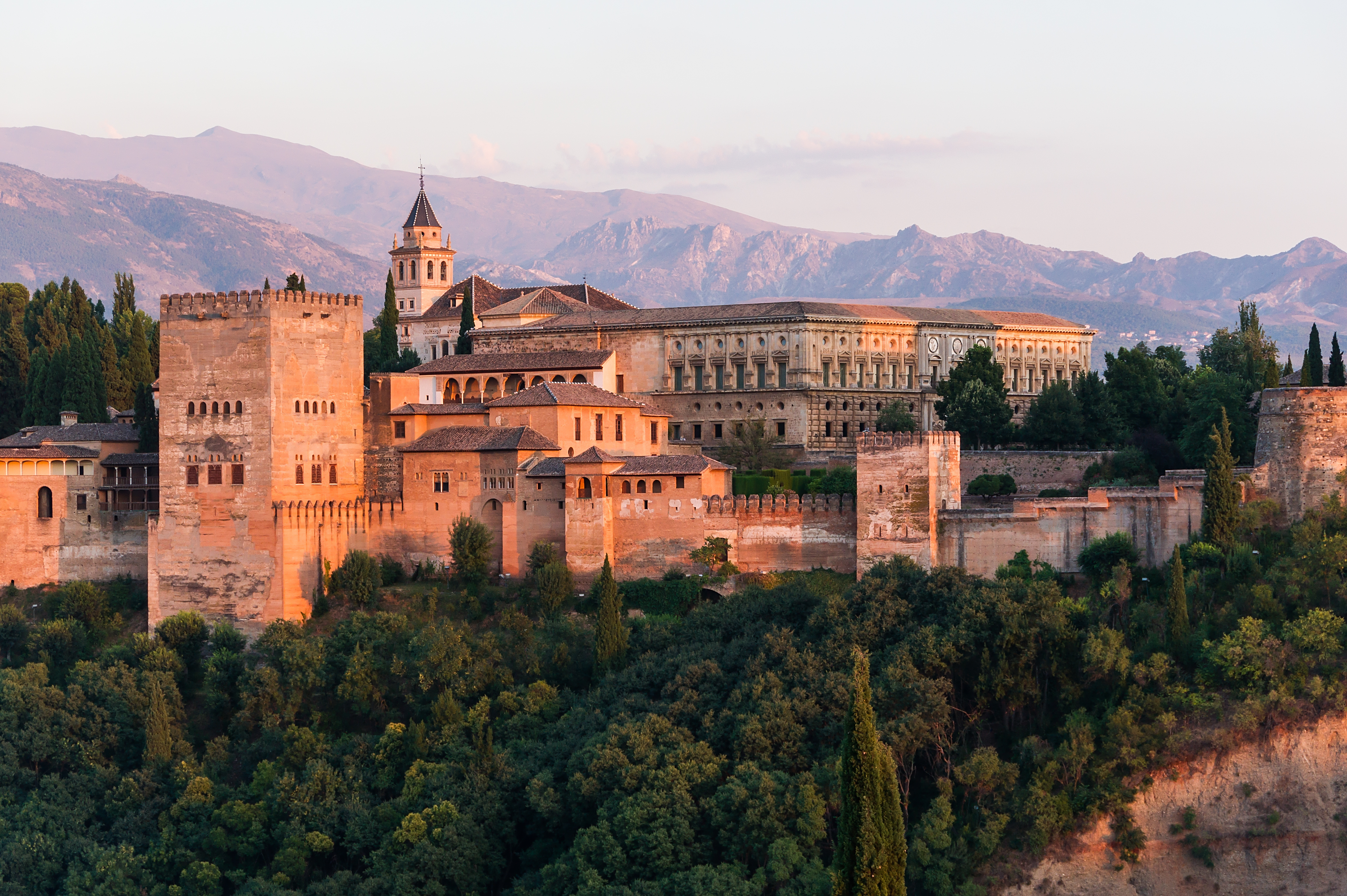
The Alhambra hosted the Royal reception and dinner of the 3rd EPC summit on 5 October 2023.

Spain had been announced as the host of the third EPC summit in October 2022. The date and the venue for the summit were announced in February 2023.

An informal meeting of the European Council took place the following day at the same venue.

== Schedule and agenda ==
The summit took place on 5 October 2023 at the Granada Conference Centre and was structured as follows (CEST):

- 11:30 - Arrival and doorsteps
- 12:30:13:30 - Roundtable
- 13:30-13:00 - Plenary meeting
- 13:30-15:00 - Thematic clusters on digitalisation and digital transition; energy, environment and green transition; multilateralism and geostrategy
- 15:00 - Press conference (cancelled)

In the evening, King Felipe VI and Queen Letizia welcomed the summit attendees and their companions at the Alhambra's Court of the Lions where the official group photo was taken. Afterwards, guests walked to the nearby Partal gardens to attend a flamenco performance and to the Parador where the closing dinner took place.

== Participants ==
Countries participating in the European Political Community

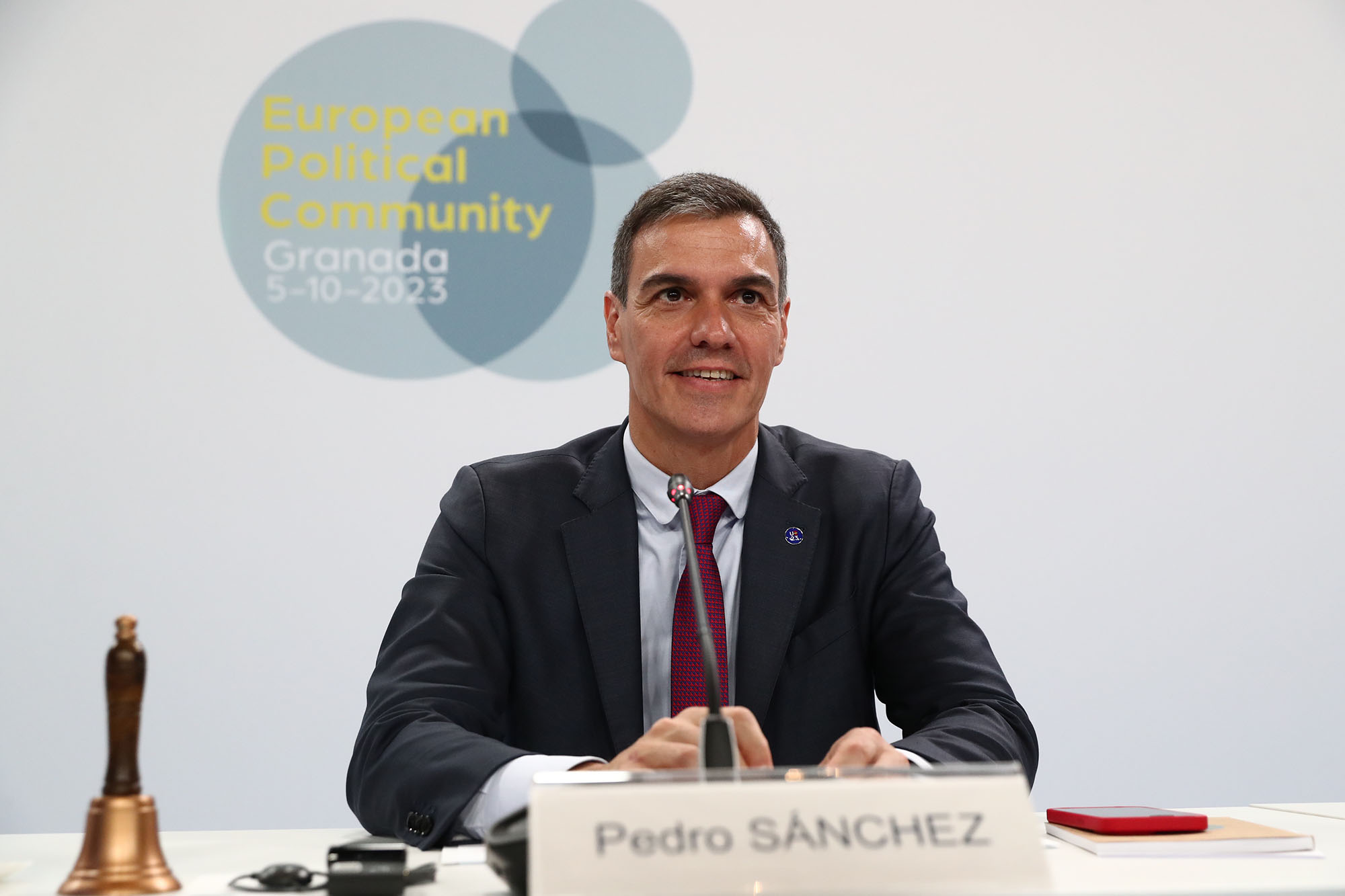
Spanish prime minister Pedro Sánchez chaired the plenary session of the summit

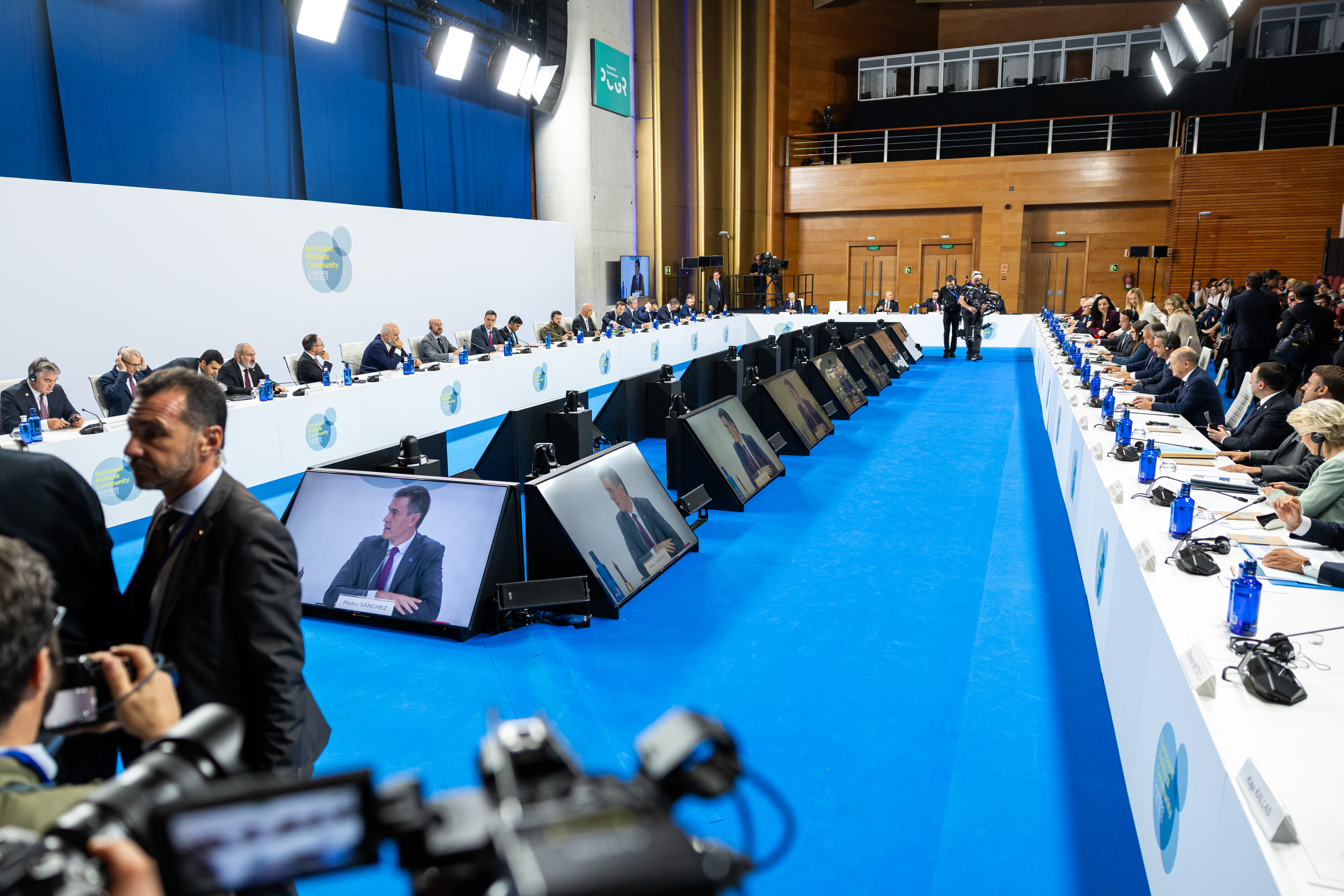
Plenary session

The summit was attended by heads of state or government of the states participating in the European Political Community along with the President of the European Council, the President of the European Commission and the President of the European Parliament. On the eve of the summit, Turkish president Recep Tayyip Erdoğan announced he would not be able to attend due to an illness. Azerbaijani president Ilham Aliyev did not attend due to a perceived "anti-Azerbaijan atmosphere" following the recent Azerbaijani military offensive in Nagorno-Karabakh. Belarusian opposition leader Sviatlana Tsikhanouskaya was invited to attend by the Spanish government.

Key
Absent

Member		Represented by	Title
(Albania)	Albania	Edi Rama	Prime Minister
(Andorra)	Andorra	Xavier Espot	Prime Minister
(Armenia)	Armenia	Nikol Pashinyan	Prime Minister
(Austria)	Austria	Karl Nehammer	Chancellor
(Azerbaijan)	Azerbaijan		
(Belgium)	Belgium	Alexander De Croo	Prime Minister
(Bosnia and Herzegovina)	Bosnia and Herzegovina	Željko Komšić	Chairman of the Presidency
(Bulgaria)	Bulgaria	Nikolay Denkov	Prime Minister
(Croatia)	Croatia	Andrej Plenković	Prime Minister
(Cyprus)	Cyprus	Nikos Christodoulides	President
(Czech Republic)	Czech Republic	Petr Fiala	Prime Minister
(Denmark)	Denmark	Mette Frederiksen	Prime Minister
(Estonia)	Estonia	Kaja Kallas	Prime Minister
(European Union)	European Union		
(European Union)	European Union	Josep Borrell	High Representative of the Union for Foreign Affairs and Security Policy
(European Union)	European Union	Charles Michel	President of the European Council
(European Union)	European Union	Ursula von der Leyen	President of the European Commission
(European Union)	European Union	Roberta Metsola	President of the European Parliament
(Finland)	Finland	Petteri Orpo	Prime Minister
(France)	France	Emmanuel Macron	President
(Georgia (country))	Georgia	Irakli Garibashvili	Prime Minister
(Germany)	Germany	Olaf Scholz	Chancellor
(Greece)	Greece	Kyriakos Mitsotakis	Prime Minister
(Hungary)	Hungary	Viktor Orbán	Prime Minister
(Iceland)	Iceland	Katrín Jakobsdóttir	Prime Minister
(Republic of Ireland)	Ireland	Leo Varadkar	Taoiseach
(Italy)	Italy	Giorgia Meloni	Prime Minister
(Kosovo)	Kosovo	Vjosa Osmani	President
(Latvia)	Latvia	Evika Siliņa	Prime Minister
(Liechtenstein)	Liechtenstein	Daniel Risch	Prime Minister
(Lithuania)	Lithuania	Gitanas Nausėda	President
(Luxembourg)	Luxembourg	Xavier Bettel	Prime Minister
(Malta)	Malta	Robert Abela	Prime Minister
(Moldova)	Moldova	Maia Sandu	President
(Monaco)	Monaco	Pierre Dartout	Minister of State
(Montenegro)	Montenegro	Jakov Milatović	President
(Netherlands)	Netherlands	Mark Rutte	Prime Minister
(North Macedonia)	North Macedonia	Dimitar Kovačevski	Prime Minister
(Norway)	Norway	Jonas Gahr Støre	Prime Minister
(Poland)	Poland	Mateusz Morawiecki	Prime Minister
(Portugal)	Portugal	António Costa	Prime Minister
(Romania)	Romania	Klaus Iohannis	President
(San Marino)	San Marino	Luca Beccari	Secretary for Foreign Affairs
(Serbia)	Serbia	Aleksandar Vučić	President
(Slovakia)	Slovakia	Ľudovít Ódor	Prime Minister
(Slovenia)	Slovenia	Robert Golob	Prime Minister
(Spain)	Spain	Pedro Sánchez	Prime Minister
(Sweden)	Sweden	Ulf Kristersson	Prime Minister
(Switzerland)	Switzerland	Alain Berset	President
(Turkey)	Turkey		
(Ukraine)	Ukraine	Volodymyr Zelenskyy	President
(United Kingdom)	United Kingdom	Rishi Sunak	Prime Minister

=== Invited delegates ===
Entity	Represented by	Title
United Transitional Cabinet of Belarus	Sviatlana Tsikhanouskaya	Head

== Outcomes ==
=== Armenia-Azerbaijan relations ===
A meeting between Armenian Prime Minister Nikol Pashinyan and Azerbaijani President Ilham Aliyev was scheduled be held at the summit as was the case at the two previous summits. This was expected to be the first meeting between the two following the 2023 Azerbaijani offensive in Nagorno-Karabakh and resulting flight of Nagorno-Karabakh Armenians. However, on the eve of the summit, Aliyev announced that he would not attend due to what he described as an "anti-Azerbaijani atmosphere". Pashinyan had hoped to present a potential peace agreement between Armenia and Azerbaijan at the meeting. A spokesperson for the Azerbaijani leadership indicated that Aliyev was willing to meet with Pashinyan in Brussels in the near future to resume dialogue. In Aliyev's absence, a meeting between Pashinyan and European Council president Charles Michel, French president Emmanuel Macron, and German chancellor Olaf Scholz took place instead. During a meeting between Ursula von der Leyen and Nikol Pashinyan, von der Leyen stated "We reiterated our condemnation of the military operation by Azerbaijan against the Armenian population of Nagorno-Karabakh and reaffirmed the need to respect the sovereignty and territorial integrity of Armenia. Armenia and the EU are bound by shared political values and their commitment to a rules-based international order. In these difficult times, the EU and Armenia stand shoulder to shoulder. We are committed to further strengthen EU-Armenia relations". President von der Leyen also informed of the preparations for a joint EU-US event to support Armenia.

Following the summit, it was announced that the EU would host a meeting between Pashinyan and Aliyev before the end of October 2023.

=== Belarusian opposition ===
Belarusian opposition leader Sviatlana Tsikhanouskaya was invited to attend the summit by the Spanish government. Tsikhanouskaya held bilateral meetings with the leaders of Armenia, the Czech Republic, Latvia, Spain, and with Josep Borrell, the High Representative of the European Union's Common Foreign and Security Policy.

=== Cyber security ===
France proposed that access to the European Cybersecurity Competence Centre's Cybersecurity Emergency Fund should be available to all EPC participating states. France signed an agreement with the governments of Montenegro and Slovenia to establish a joint cyber resilience capacity-building training institute to be based in Montenegro.

=== Energy security ===
Michel and Von der Leyen praised Europe's joint efforts in energy security. EU member states together with Norway, Ukraine, Moldova and Serbia agreed to work together within the EU Energy Platform to improve energy efficiency and further harness renewable sources of energy.

=== European unity and EU enlargement ===
Ukrainian president Volodymyr Zelenskyy and Spanish prime minister Pedro Sánchez stressed the importance of maintaining unity across the continent. Josep Borrell said he was optimistic about the European Commission granting EU candidate status to Georgia. The leaders of Hungary, and Lithuania stressed the importance of Georgia's accession for regional stability. Coinciding with the summit, the European Parliament urged that EU accession talks with Moldova should open before the end of the year.

=== Kosovo-Serbia relations ===
Given the strained relations between Kosovo and Serbia, stemming from the Banjska attack, it is anticipated that the tense dynamic between the two nations will be a prominent subject of discussion. European leaders are endeavoring to facilitate a meeting between the President of Serbia, Aleksandar Vučić, and the President of Kosovo, Vjosa Osmani. Chancellor Olaf Scholz affirmed that the heightened tensions between the two states will also be addressed on Thursday and Friday during the summit scheduled to take place in Granada. President Osmani has declined a meeting with the President of Serbia, asserting that sanctions against Serbia must precede any further dialogue.

=== Migration ===
The leaders of Italy, the United Kingdom, The Netherlands, France, Albania, and the European Commission held a meeting about migration on the fringes of the summit. In a statement released afterwards, they pledged to take action to tackle human trafficking by strengthening external borders to prevent unauthorized crossings, increase patrols and search and rescue operations, harmonize criminal legislation to fight against people smugglers and support sustainable development through education, job creation and climate action to help reduce migration.

=== Youth mobility ===
France stated its intention to push for the expansion of the "DiscoverEU" youth mobility scheme to be expanded to include all EPC participating states.

== Concerns and controversy ==
Rishi Sunak's behavior

United Kingdom prime minister Rishi Sunak caused controversy a few days before the summit by insisting that the agreed agenda be scrapped and the sole focus be migration. After failing to get the scheduled agenda scrapped, Sunak co-hosted a fringe meeting on migration with Italian prime minister Giorgia Meloni. Sunak caused further controversy by refusing to participate in the summit's closing press conference, resulting in it being cancelled. He also snubbed the Spanish Royal family by refusing to attend the post summit banquet hosted by King Felipe VI of Spain, a second cousin once removed of King Charles III of the United Kingdom.

== See also ==
- European integration
- Pan-European identity
- Politics of Europe
