= 4th European Political Community Summit =

European Political Community Summit

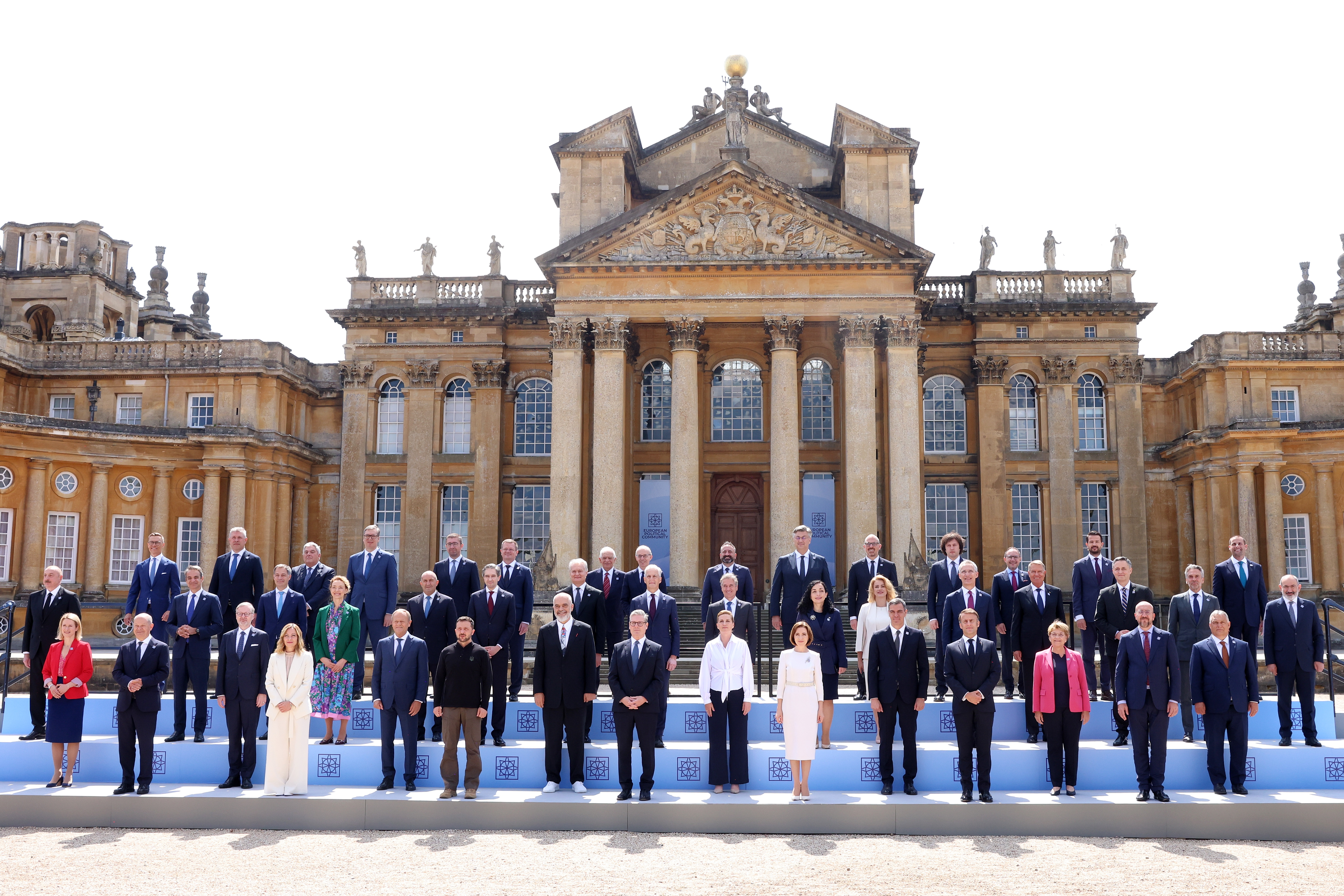
- European leaders at the 4th EPC Summit
- Host country: United Kingdom
- Date: 18 July 2024
- Cities: Woodstock
- Venues: Blenheim Palace
- Participants: 42 states
- Chair: Keir Starmer, Prime Minister of the United Kingdom
- Follows: 3rd
- Precedes: 5th
- Website: UK Government; EU Council

The Fourth European Political Community Summit was a meeting of the European Political Community held on 18 July 2024 at Blenheim Palace in Woodstock, United Kingdom.

== Aims ==
Following a bilateral summit meeting between the leaders of the United Kingdom and France on 10 March 2023, it was stated in the joint declaration that the EPC should focus on energy, infrastructures, connectivity, cybersecurity, countering disinformation and migration.

On the eve of the second EPC summit which was held on 1 June 2023, British prime minister Rishi Sunak issued a statement saying "Stopping migration and securing our borders should be at the top of the agenda for European leaders". Sunak had also caused controversy at the previous summit in Granada by demanding that the pre-arranged agenda be scrapped with the sole focus of the summit shifting to immigration. When announcing the date of the summit, Sunak added that it would focus on supporting Ukraine during the ongoing Russian invasion, tackling people smuggling and reducing immigration. In a Politico article, John Kampfner reported that Keir Starmer would maintain Sunak's agenda, including the topic of migration.

Sunak unexpectedly announced on 22 May 2024, that a general election would be held on 4 July 2024, just two weeks before the summit is due to take place. The Labour Party won that election and Starmer subsequently became prime minister. Whilst in opposition, Keir Starmer had indicated that he would use the summit to begin establishing a “new geopolitical partnership”; Starmer's European aims include: improving the Trade and Cooperation Agreement (TCA) by renegotiating its free trade agreement terms, and rejoining the Erasmus student exchange program. Starmer has previously ruled out rejoining the European Union, the single market, or entering a customs union. Shadow Foreign Secretary David Lammy has stated he wants the UK and the EU to create a security pact, and for the UK to attend meetings of the EU's Foreign Affairs Council. Starmer aims to use the summit to reset relations with the EU, share ideas for a new Border Command to tackle migration and to sign a defence co-operation deal with Germany, based on the Lancaster House Treaties. Starmer's aides have downplayed the chances on using the summit to renegotiate the TCA, including veterinary agreements and mobility deals.

== Preparation ==
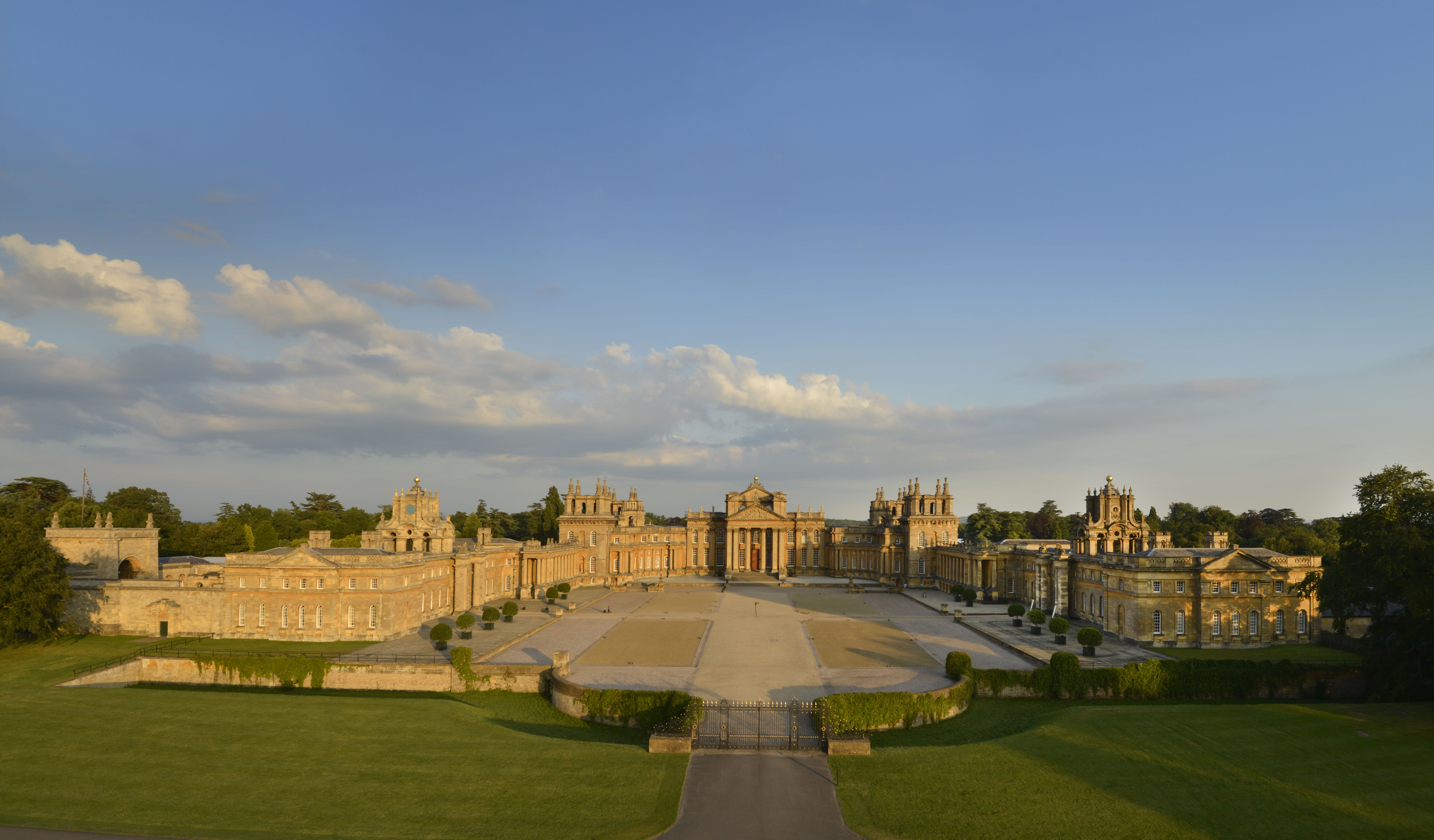
Blenheim Palace hosted the 4th EPC summit on 18 July 2024

The United Kingdom was awarded the right to host the fourth EPC summit in October 2022 at the request of then prime minister Liz Truss. King Charles III mentioned the UK's hosting the EPC summit as part of his speech during the 2023 State Opening of Parliament.

Preparations for the summit were discussed by the upper house of the UK Parliament on 12 December 2023. Tariq Ahmed, a minister in the UK foreign office stated that the UK views the EPC as an "important platform for co-ordination on European issues" adding that energy security, immigration and the Russian invasion of Ukraine would feature on the agenda.

The summit was initially expected to take place in March or April, however by January 2024, several European diplomats believe the UK government's refusal to rule out a snap general election this spring lies behind "delays" to an upcoming meeting. The UK government has stated that it will announce a date "in due course". On 14 March 2024, UK media reported that the summit is now planned to take place in July. This caused frustration among some of the Nordic countries who would already be on their summer holidays. Sunak aimed for the summit to focus on immigration. On 19 March 2024, the UK Government finally announced that the summit would take place on 18 July, and will be held at Blenheim Palace.

In a letter from then British foreign minister David Cameron, the UK government pledged to work with European partners to promote coherence across this and future EPC summits. On 25 March 2024, British ambassador to Hungary, Paul Fox, met with Hungarian Europe minister, János Bóka, promising to promote coherence across EPC summits; Hungary is scheduled to host the following summit in November 2024. UK prime minister Rishi Sunak discussed plans and preparations for the summit with French president Emmanuel Macron in a phone call on 8 April 2024, where he stated that defending Ukraine, progressing cooperation on artificial intelligence and joint efforts to tackle illegal immigration and organized crime would be part of its agenda.

On 22 May 2024, Sunak unexpectedly announced a general election for 4 July. The Labour Party won that election, with Sunak being replaced by Keir Starmer as prime minister and David Lammy being appointed as the new foreign secretary.

Starmer hosted Irish Taoiseach Simon Harris at Chequers on the eve of the summit.

== Schedule and agenda ==
The summit took place on 18 July 2024 at Blenheim Palace in Woodstock. The agenda included an opening plenary, followed by three roundtables on migration (chaired by Italy and Albania), energy and connectivity (chaired by Norway and Slovenia), and defending and securing democracy, before ending with a closing plenary. Swiss president Viola Amherd presented feedback from the June 2024 Ukraine peace summit that took place in Bürgenstock, Switzerland.

The schedule and agenda is as follows:

- 8.00: Arrivals and doorsteps
- 10.00: Opening session chaired by Keir Starmer with contributions by Volodymyr Zelenskyy, Viola Amherd and Mette Frederiksen
- 11.30: Family photo
- 12.00: Thematic roundtables on migration, energy and connectivity, and defending and securing democracy
- 13:00: Opportunity for bilateral/multilateral meetings and lunch
- 14.45: Closing plenary
- 15:45: Reception with King Charles III
- 16:45: Bilateral/multilateral meetings, press remarks by Keir Starmer and Emmanuel Macron

== Participants ==
=== Participating states and organizations ===
Countries participating in the European Political Community

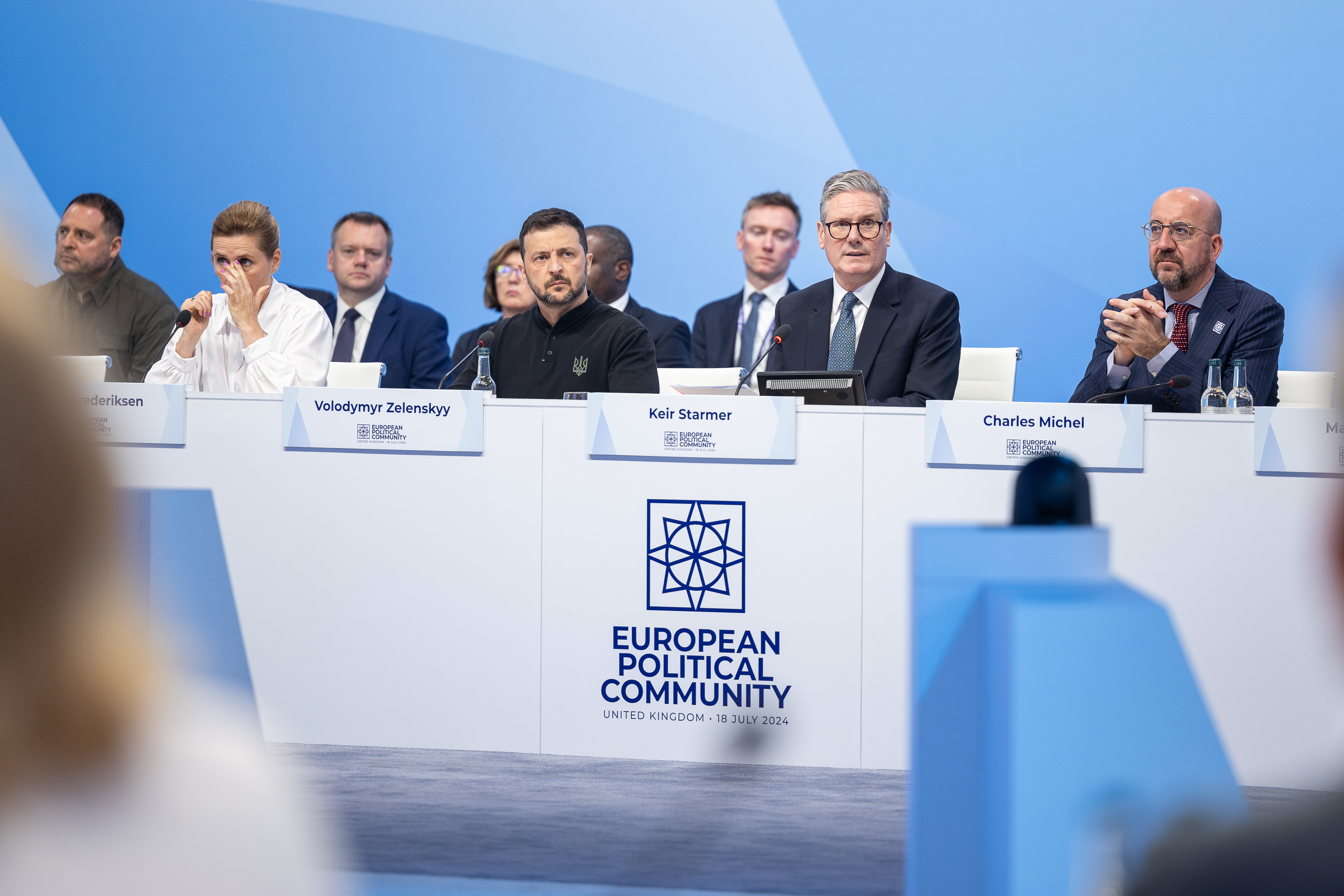
British Prime Minister Keir Starmer chaired the summit

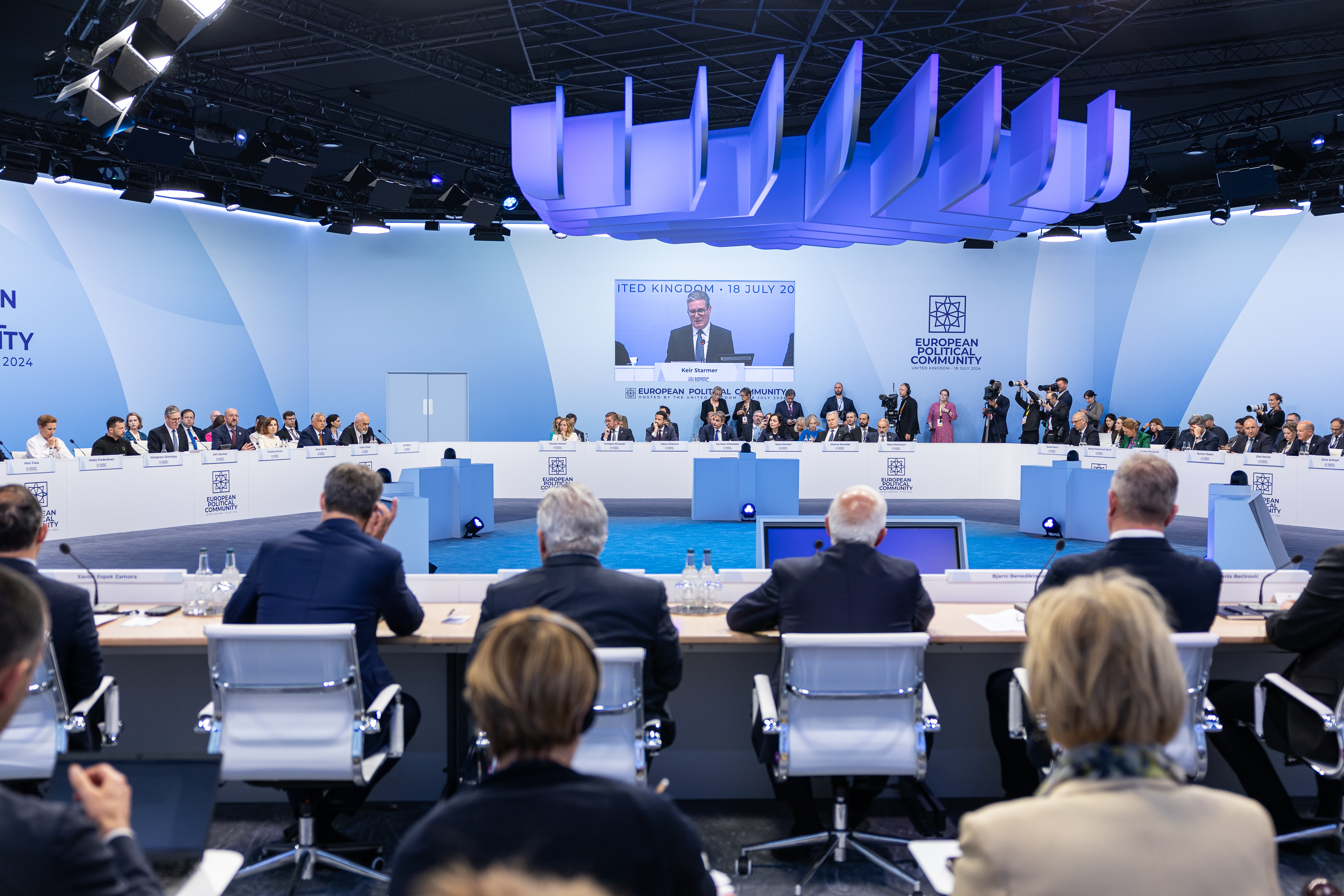
Opening session

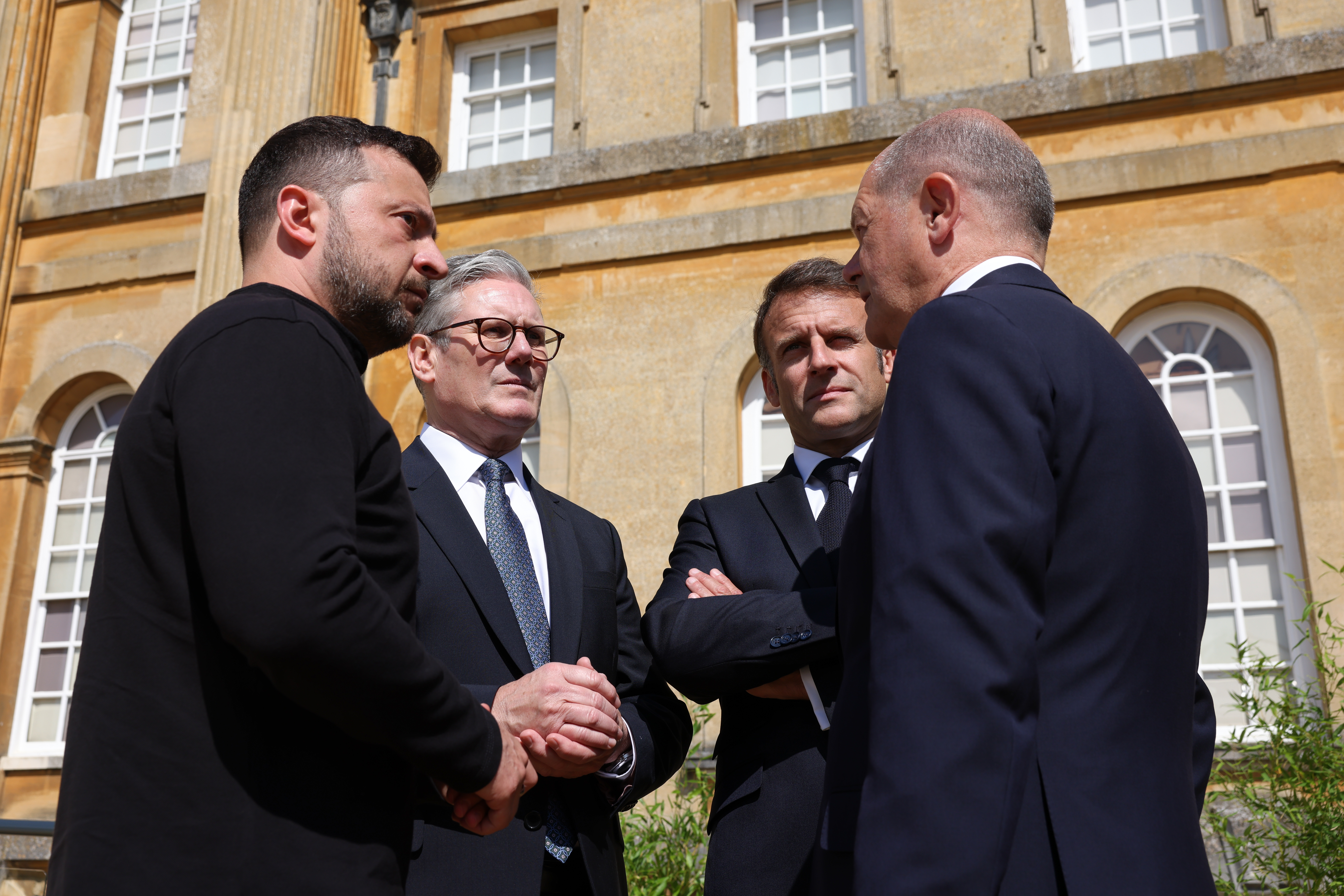
European leaders at Blenheim Palace

The summit was attended by heads of state or government of the states participating in the European Political Community, alongside the President of the European Council and High Representative of the Union for Foreign Affairs and Security Policy. The British government stated that "around 50" leaders would attend the UK EPC event. Rishi Sunak invited NATO Secretary General Jens Stoltenberg to the UK's EPC summit during a meeting in Warsaw, on 23 April 2024. On 14 July 2024, Keir Starmer announced that representatives of the Organization for Security and Co-operation in Europe and the Council of Europe would be attending the summit.

Turkish president Recep Tayyip Erdoğan was unable to attend the summit due to a packed travel schedule. Prime Minister of Portugal Luís Montenegro also cancelled his participation for health reasons. Austria, Cyprus and Sweden were also absent.

Key
Absent

Member		Represented by	Title
(Albania)	Albania	Edi Rama	Prime Minister
(Andorra)	Andorra	Xavier Espot Zamora	Prime Minister
(Armenia)	Armenia	Nikol Pashinyan	Prime Minister
(Austria)	Austria		
(Azerbaijan)	Azerbaijan	Ilham Aliyev	President
(Belgium)	Belgium	Alexander De Croo	Prime Minister
(Bosnia and Herzegovina)	Bosnia and Herzegovina	Denis Bećirović	Chairman of the Presidency
(Bulgaria)	Bulgaria	Rumen Radev	President
(Croatia)	Croatia	Andrej Plenković	Prime Minister
(Cyprus)	Cyprus		
(Czech Republic)	Czech Republic	Petr Fiala	Prime Minister
(Denmark)	Denmark	Mette Frederiksen	Prime Minister
(Estonia)	Estonia	Kaja Kallas	Prime Minister
(European Union)	European Union		
(European Union)	European Union	Charles Michel	President of the European Council
(European Union)	European Union	Josep Borrell	High Representative of the Union for Foreign Affairs and Security Policy
(Finland)	Finland	Alexander Stubb	President
(France)	France	Emmanuel Macron	President
(Georgia (country))	Georgia	Irakli Kobakhidze	Prime Minister
(Germany)	Germany	Olaf Scholz	Chancellor
(Greece)	Greece	Kyriakos Mitsotakis	Prime Minister
(Hungary)	Hungary	Viktor Orbán	Prime Minister
(Iceland)	Iceland	Bjarni Benediktsson	Prime Minister
(Republic of Ireland)	Ireland	Simon Harris	Taoiseach
(Italy)	Italy	Giorgia Meloni	Prime Minister
(Kosovo)	Kosovo	Vjosa Osmani	President
(Latvia)	Latvia	Evika Siliņa	Prime Minister
(Liechtenstein)	Liechtenstein	Daniel Risch	Prime Minister
(Lithuania)	Lithuania	Gitanas Nausėda	President
(Luxembourg)	Luxembourg	Luc Frieden	Prime Minister
(Malta)	Malta	Robert Abela	Prime Minister
(Moldova)	Moldova	Maia Sandu	President
(Monaco)	Monaco	Pierre Dartout	Minister of State
(Montenegro)	Montenegro	Jakov Milatović	President
(Netherlands)	Netherlands	Dick Schoof	Prime Minister
(North Macedonia)	North Macedonia	Hristijan Mickoski	Prime Minister
(Norway)	Norway	Jonas Gahr Støre	Prime Minister
(Poland)	Poland	Donald Tusk	Prime Minister
(Portugal)	Portugal		
(Romania)	Romania	Klaus Iohannis	President
(San Marino)	San Marino	Luca Beccari	Secretary of State for Foreign and Political Affairs
(Serbia)	Serbia	Aleksandar Vučić	President
(Slovakia)	Slovakia	Peter Kmec	Deputy Prime Minister
(Slovenia)	Slovenia	Robert Golob	Prime Minister
(Spain)	Spain	Pedro Sánchez	Prime Minister
(Sweden)	Sweden		
(Switzerland)	Switzerland	Viola Amherd	President
(Turkey)	Turkey		
(Ukraine)	Ukraine	Volodymyr Zelenskyy	President
(United Kingdom)	United Kingdom	Keir Starmer	Prime Minister

=== Invited delegates ===
Entity		Represented by	Title
(Council of Europe)	Council of Europe	Marija Pejčinović Burić	Secretary-General
(NATO)	North Atlantic Treaty Organization	Jens Stoltenberg	Secretary-General
(Organization for Security and Co-operation in Europe)	Organization for Security and Co-operation in Europe	Helga Schmid	Secretary-General
	United Transitional Cabinet of Belarus	Sviatlana Tsikhanouskaya	Head

== Outcomes ==
=== Future EPC summits ===
During the closing press conference, Keir Starmer confirmed that the next summit will take place in Hungary followed by summits in Albania and Denmark in 2025. A quartet coordination mechanism comprising the UK, Hungary, Albania, and Denmark was put in place to provide continuity between these planned summits.

=== Armenia–Azerbaijan relations ===
Prior to the summit, the host government attempted to arrange a bilateral meeting between the Armenian Prime Minister Nikol Pashinyan and the Azerbaijani President Ilham Aliyev on the sidelines of the summit. Despite the efforts of the UK, the anticipated meeting between Pashinyan and Aliyev did not take place. A senior British government official stated that "the UK is not attempting to mediate the ongoing dispute between Armenia and Azerbaijan." The Armenian Foreign Ministry confirmed that they were open to meeting with the Azerbaijani side and stated that "the Armenian side also reiterates its proposal to intensify the negotiations on the highest levels and to reach the signing of the peace treaty within one month."

French President Emmanuel Macron met with Pashinyan on the sidelines of the summit and also defended French arms sales to Armenia during a press conference. Macron stated, "It is normal to respond to the request of a sovereign country which wants to equip itself [militarily] and which thinks that it could be attacked by another. If we look at the last decade, it seems that Azerbaijan has become much more equipped than Armenia. And if I have a good memory -- but correct me if I'm wrong -- Azerbaijan launched a war, and a terrible war, in 2020."

=== Belarusian opposition ===
For the second time, Belarusian opposition leader Sviatlana Tsikhanouskaya was invited to attend the summit by the host government. She held bilateral meetings with a range of European leaders relating to aid to political prisoners, support for civil society and preservation of Belarusian culture.

=== Foreign information manipulation and interference ===
Following on from the "defending and securing democracy" roundtable, the leaders of Andorra, Bosnia and Herzegovina, the Czech Republic, Finland, France, Iceland, Kosovo, Lithuania and Moldova together with representatives of NATO and the EU agreed to establish a Collaborative Network to Counter Foreign Information Manipulation and Interference.

=== Human trafficking and irregular migration ===
During the closing press conference, Keir Starner stated that the UK's new Border Security Command would work with Europol and the European Migrant Smuggling Centre to counter people smuggling and illegal migration. The UK committed £84 million over three years for development projects in Africa and the Middle East to reduce economic migration and signed agreements with Slovakia and Slovenia to tackle organised crime gangs.

=== Moldova ===
A meeting of the Moldova Support Group was convened on the fringes of the summit. Moldovan President Maia Sandu met with Charles Michel, Keir Starmer, Emmanuel Macron, Olaf Scholz, Klaus Iohannis and Donald Tusk to discuss Moldova's resilience and gain support towards a secure and prosperous future.

=== Ukraine ===
Upon arrival at the summit, NATO secretary general Jens Stoltenberg announced plans for a new 700 personnel NATO command centre based in Wiesbaden, Germany to coordinate support for Ukraine during its ongoing invasion by Russia.

During the opening plenary session, Swiss president Viola Amherd announced that 87 countries had signed the global peace summit communique.

Ukraine signed agreements with Slovenia and the Czech Republic to allow those countries to provide long term military and humanitarian assistance. The Czech Republic agreed to boost cooperation in the military tech sphere, including the production of ammunition, small arms, drones, electronic warfare, and heavy equipment. Slovenia will allocate an additional 5 million euros for humanitarian aid, economic recovery, and the Grain from Ukraine program and will support with training within the framework of the European Union Military Assistance Mission in support of Ukraine.

Prior to the summit, Bloomberg reported that British prime minister Keir Starmer will use the summit to launch a plan to tackle the shadow fleet of oil tankers Russia is using to avoid international sanctions. Starmer confirmed these plans during his closing press conference later adding that an additional 11 vessels would be subject to international sanctions. A joint call to action to tackle the shadow fleet was published and endorsed by most of the states represented at the summit.

Following on from the summit, Volodymyr Zelenskyy addressed the UK Cabinet where he called for Western allies to allow long-range strikes on military targets within Russia. Keir Starmer unveiled a Defence Export Support Treaty to enable Ukraine to draw on $4.5 billion of funding for its defence industry.

=== United Kingdom ===
The new Labour government used the summit to reset relationships between the UK and its European partners which had become strained during the tenure of the previous Conservative administration. Keir Starmer reiterated that the UK would not leave the European Convention on Human Rights during his opening remarks, hailing Winston Churchill as one of the architects of the convention which was built upon a "blood bond" between allies during World War II. The UK government also proposed the possibility of holding regular UK-EU summits similar to the ones held between the EU and other third countries such as the USA and China. The first of such summits was held on 19 May 2025, at which point the UK and EU signed a trade agreement. Following on from the summit, the UK signed defence cooperation agreements with Germany and Ukraine.

== See also ==
- European integration
- Foreign relations of the European Union
- Foreign relations of the United Kingdom
- Pan-European identity
- Politics of Europe
- 2025 London Summit on Ukraine
