= List of international presidential trips made by Justina Shiroka Pula =

Justina Shiroka Pula is the incumbent President of Kosovo since 2026.

Justina Shiroka Pula has served as President of Kosovo since 7 October 2026. As of 23 October 2026, Pula has made one international trip to one country as president.

== Summary ==
As of 23 October 2026, the number of visits per country where President Shiroka Pula traveled are:

- One visit to Hungary

== List ==
=== 2026 ===
No.	Country	Date	Cities visited	Type of visit	Rf.
1	Hungary	23 October 2026	Budapest	The 70th anniversary of the Hungarian Revolution	

== Multilateral meetings ==
Multilateral meetings of the following intergovernmental organizations took place during Justina Shiroka Pula's presidency (2026–present).

Group	Year		
Group	2026	2027	2028
UNGA	22–28 September, (United States) New York City	September, (United States) New York City	September, (United States) New York City
EPC	4 May, (Armenia) Yerevan	April, (Switzerland) Zurich	April, (Azerbaijan) Baku
EPC	12 November (Note: In lieu of the President, the Republic of Kosovo was represented by Prime Minister Albin Kurti.), (Republic of Ireland) Dublin	November, (Greece) TBC	November, (Latvia) Riga
SEECP	10 June, (Bulgaria) Sofia	June, (Romania) Bucharest	TBC
OIF	15–16 November, (Cambodia) Phnom Penh (Note: In lieu of the President, the Republic of Kosovo was represented by Minister of Foreign Affairs Glauk Konjufca.)	none	November, (Canada) Ottawa
BBP	October, (North Macedonia) Skopje	TBC	TBC
Others	none	TBC	TBC
██ = Future event ██ = Did not attend ██ = She was not president

== Bilateral meetings with foreign officials ==
	Country	Dignitary	Year
1	Hungary	Meeting with President of Hungary, András Baka; Meeting with Prime Minister of Hungary, Péter Magyar	2026

== See also ==
- Politics of Kosovo
- Foreign relations of Kosovo
- International recognition of Kosovo
