= List of international prime ministerial trips made by Luc Frieden =

This is a list of international prime ministerial trips made by Luc Frieden, the current Prime Minister of Luxembourg since 17 November 2023.

== Summary ==
Frieden has visited 23 countries during his tenure as prime minister. The number of visits per country where Frieden has traveled are:

- One visit to Albania, Armenia, Canada, Croatia, Cyprus, Denmark, Finland, Hungary, Ireland, Japan, Moldova, Portugal, Switzerland, Turkey and Ukraine.
- Two visits to Poland, the United Kingdom, the United States and Vatican City
- Three visits to the Netherlands
- Four visits to Germany
- Eight visits to France
- Thirteen visits to Belgium

== 2023 ==
Country	Location(s)	Dates	Details
France	Paris	28 November	First working visit abroad to meet with President Macron and Prime Minister Borne in Paris to discuss Europe's strategic future, bilateral cooperation on energy policy, mobility, digital transition, and EU budget matters .
Belgium	Brussels	29 November	Met with Ursula von der Leyen, discussing telework, the single market, competitiveness, EU enlargement, Ukraine, and the multiannual financial framework and Belgian prime minister Alexander De Croo, ahead of the Benelux summit, focusing on bilateral relations and Belgium's EU/Benelux priorities for 2024.
Belgium	Brussels	7 December	He travelled to NATO headquarters to meet NATO Secretary General Jens Stoltenberg. This meeting took place ahead of the Washington Summit, which will mark the Alliance's 75th anniversary. The Summit will be an opportunity for the Alliance to demonstrate its unity and strength, with Sweden taking part as the 32nd member country. The primary aim of the meeting was to reiterate Luxembourg's firm support for NATO's mission to ensure the security and stability of the European continent. He also met the president of the European Parliament, Roberta Metsola. The president underlined Luxembourg's role as the headquarters of the European institutions.
Belgium	Brussels	13–15 December	Attendance in Brussels at the EU–Western Balkans Summit (13 December) and the European Council (14–15 December). Deepening relations with Western Balkans partners. Joint declaration on foreign and security policy alignment. EU enlargement to Ukraine and Moldova, candidate status for Georgia, accession negotiations to start with Bosnia-Herzegovina. Discussions on the multiannual financial framework, defense industrial strategy, migration, EU‑Turkey, and combating xenophobia.

== 2024 ==
Country	Location(s)	Dates	Details
France	Paris	5 January	Frieden attended the commemoration ceremony of Jacques Delors.
Germany	Berlin	8 January	First external visit was to Olaf Scholz. amid violent protests by German farmers.
France	Paris	26 February	Frieden travelled to Paris, where Emmanuel Macron was holding an emergency summit over the situation in Ukraine, as they had suffered the loss of Avdiivka. Czech Prime Minister Peter Fiala proposed to purchase 500,000 rounds of artillery ammunition for Ukrainian forces.
Netherlands	The Hague	4 March	Working visit to Prime Minister Mark Rutte. Discussion topics included renewable energy (hydrogen), defence, agriculture, competitiveness, Ukraine, and a planned joint trade mission. Followed by engagement at Instituut Clingendael and discussion with Luxembourg students in the Netherlands.
Poland	Warsaw	11 April	Invited by European Council president Charles Michel for a working dinner on the EU's next strategic agenda. Bilateral meeting with Polish prime minister Donald Tusk on EU priorities and Luxembourg–Poland relations.
Portugal	Lisbon	31 May	First EU leader received by Prime Minister Luís Montenegro. Discussions focused on strengthening bilateral economic, technological, and renewable energy collaboration, as well as preparing for European elections and council agendas.
France	Normandy	6 June	Invited by French president Emmanuel Macron, attended the international commemoration of the 80th anniversary of the Normandy landings, honoring Allied soldiers and Luxembourg nationals who fought in WWII.
Switzerland	Lucerne	15–16 June	Attended Global Peace Summit
Belgium	Brussels	17 June	Frieden attended an informal European Council summit.
United States	Washington D.C.	9–11 July	Frieden attended the 2024 NATO summit
United Kingdom	Woodstock	18 July	Frieden attended the 4th European Political Community Summit.
France	Paris	26 July	Frieden travelled to Paris to attend the 2024 Summer Olympics opening ceremony.
Moldova	Chișinău	13 September	Frieden travelled to Chișinău to meet with Prime Minister Dorin Recean.
Hungary	Budapest	7 November	Frieden attended the 5th European Political Community Summit.

== 2025 ==
Country	Location(s)	Dates	Details
Poland	Oświęcim	27 January	Frieden attended the commemoration of the 80th anniversary of the liberation of the Auschwitz concentration camp.
Belgium	Brussels	3 February	Frieden attended an informal European Council summit.
Germany	Munich	14–16 February	Attended the 61st Munich Security Conference alongside Defence Minister Yuriko Backes—a major gathering of global leaders to discuss security, defence policy, and international collaboration.
Belgium	Brussels	20–21 March	Frieden attended a European Council summit.
France	Paris	27 March	Frieden attended a meeting of the "Coalition of the willing" hosted by President Macron.
Japan	Tokyo, Osaka	22–25 April	In Tokyo, Frieden met his Japanese counterpart, Prime Minister Shigeru Ishiba, who received him with military honours. The aim of the meeting was to strengthen bilateral relations and exchange views on key international issues. He also travelled to Osaka for the 2025 World Expo, where he visited the Luxembourg and Japanese pavilions. Osaka hosted the first World Expo to be held in Asia 55 years ago, in 1970. The visit was also an opportunity to underline the shared commitment of Luxembourg and Japan to innovation and technological progress.
Vatican City	Vatican City	26 April	Attended funeral of Pope Francis.
Finland	Helsinki	6 May	Met with Prime Minister Petteri Orpo and with President Alexander Stubb
Albania	Tirana	16 May	Frieden attended the 6th European Political Community Summit.
Vatican City	Vatican City	18 May	Attended Papal inauguration of Pope Leo XIV.
Netherlands	Aachen, Eindhoven	27–28 May	He will introduce the Charlemagne Prize festivities with a speech on Europe at Aachen Cathedral on 27 May. He will also briefly travel to Eindhoven, to visit the headquarters of the European technology company and semiconductor manufacturer ASML, on 28 May.
United Kingdom	London	16 June	He visited London as part of the celebrations marking Luxembourg's National Holiday.
Netherlands	The Hague	24–25 June	Frieden attended the NATO summit.
Belgium	Brussels	26–27 June	Frieden attended the European Council meeting.
Germany	Berlin	1 July	Met with Chancellor Friedrich Merz.
United States	New York City	25 September	Attended the General debate of the eightieth session of the United Nations General Assembly.
Denmark	Copenhagen	2 October	Attended the 7th European Political Community Summit.
Belgium	Brussels	17–19 December	Attended the European Council and European Union-Western Balkans Leaders' Summit.

== 2026 ==
Country	Location(s)	Dates	Details
France	Paris	6 January	Frieden attended the Coalition of the Willing meeting in Paris with fellow leaders.
Belgium	Brussels	22 January	Attended the extraordinary meeting of the European Council.
Germany	Hamburg	26 January	Frieden attended the 2026 North Sea Summit.
Croatia	Zagreb	30–31 January	Attended the EPP Leaders’ Retreat.
Canada	Ottawa	7–9 February	Met with Prime Minister Mark Carney, focusing on strengthening bilateral cooperation in financial services, advanced manufacturing, aerospace, and space technologies. The leaders also discussed reinforcing transatlantic security, supporting Ukraine, and establishing the Defence, Security and Resilience Bank (DSR Bank).
Belgium	Antwerp, Rijkhoven	11–12 February	Frieden attended the 3rd European Industry Summit. Next day participated in the informal meeting of EU heads of state and government.
Ireland	Dublin	9 March	He and Minister of Finance Gilles Roth travelled to Dublin for an exchange of views with the Taoiseach (Prime Minister) of Ireland, Micheál Martin, and the Tánaiste and Irish Minister for Finance, Simon Harris.
Belgium	Brussels	19–20 March	Frieden attended the European Council.
Cyprus	Nicosia	23–24 April	Frieden attended an informal meeting of the European Council summit.
Armenia	Yerevan	3–4 May	Frieden attended the 8th European Political Community Summit.
Belgium	Brussels	18–19 June	Frieden attended the European Council.
Turkey	Ankara	7–8 July	Frieden attended the 2026 Ankara NATO summit.
France	Paris	13–14 July	Frieden travelled to Paris to attend a meeting with heads of state and government within the Coalition of the Willing. Frieden attended Bastille Day celebrations.
Ukraine	Kyiv	23–24 August	While travelling by train to Kyiv, Luc Frieden met with British prime minister Andy Burnham. They discussed European defence and security cooperation, including ways to strengthen defence spending through initiatives such as the Canada-backed Defence, Security and Resilience Bank and the UK-led Multilateral Defence Mechanism. Luc Frieden travelled to Kyiv at the invitation of Ukrainian president Volodymyr Zelenskyy to attend ceremonies marking the 35th anniversary of Ukraine's independence and a meeting of the Coalition of the Willing. During the independence anniversary ceremonies, Frieden paid tribute to the victims of the war and reaffirmed Luxembourg's solidarity with the Ukrainian people. At the coalition meeting, leaders discussed continued support for Ukraine, including strengthening the resilience of its energy infrastructure ahead of winter, Europe's security architecture, and the conditions for a just and lasting peace based on international law. On the sidelines, Frieden held bilateral talks with Zelenskyy and Ukrainian prime minister Sergii Koretskyi on bilateral relations, Luxembourg's continued support for Ukraine, and European security.
Belgium	Brussels	15–16 October	Frieden attended the European Council.

== Future trips ==
Country	Location	Date	Details
Ireland	Dublin	12 November	Frieden is plan to attend the 9th European Political Community Summit.
Cambodia	Phnom Penh	15–16 November	Frieden is scheduled to attend the 20th Organisation internationale de la Francophonie summit.

== Multilateral meetings ==
Luc Frieden participated in the following summits during his premiership:

Group	Year				
Group	2024	2025	2026	2027	2028
UNGA	28 September^{[a]}, (United States) New York City	26 September, (United States) New York City	TBD, (United States) New York City	TBD, (United States) New York City	TBD, (United States) New York City
NATO	9–11 July, (United States) Washington, D.C.	24–25 June, (Netherlands) The Hague	7–8 July, (Turkey) Ankara	TBD, (Albania) Tirana	TBD
EPC	18 July, (United Kingdom) Woodstock	16 May, (Albania) Tirana	4 May, (Armenia) Yerevan	TBD, (Switzerland) TBD	TBD, (Azerbaijan) TBD
EPC	7 November, (Hungary) Budapest	2 October, (Denmark) Copenhagen	12 November, (Republic of Ireland) TBD	TBD, (Greece) TBD	TBD, (Latvia) TBD
OIF	4–5 October, (France) Villers-Cotterêts	none	TBD, Cambodia	TBA	TBA
North Sea Summit	None		26 January, (Germany) Hamburg	TBA	TBA
Others	Global Peace Summit; 15–16 June, (Switzerland) Lucerne	15 March, (videoconference); United Kingdom	Together for peace and security summit 6 January, (France) Paris	TBA	TBA
Others	Global Peace Summit; 15–16 June, (Switzerland) Lucerne	Building a robust peace for Ukraine and Europe; 27 March, (France) Paris	Determined to act 13 July, (France) Paris		
██ = Future event ██ = Did not attend^aAttended by Deputy Prime Minister Xavier Bettel.
