= List of international presidential trips made by Nicușor Dan =

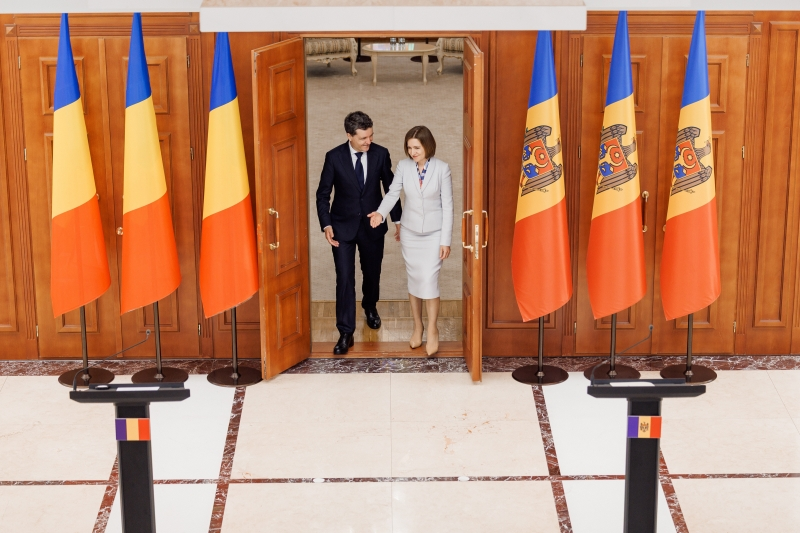
Dan's visit to Moldova on 10 June 2025 was the first bilateral meeting of his presidential term

This is a list of international presidential trips made by Nicușor Dan, the 6th and current President of Romania. As of January 2026, Nicușor Dan has made six international presidential trips, attending five summits.

== List ==
=== 2025 ===
Country	City	Date	Notes
Lithuania	Vilnius	2 June	Attended Bucharest Nine Summit
Moldova	Chișinău	10 June	Official visit to the Republic of Moldova Meeting with President Maia Sandu
Ukraine	Odesa	11 June	Attended the fourth Ukraine-South East Europe summit
Netherlands	The Hague	24–25 June	Dan attended the 2025 NATO summit.
Belgium	Brussels	26–27 June	Dan attended the European Council meeting.
Germany	Berlin	18 July	Dan paid an official visit to Germany at the invitation of President Frank-Walter Steinmeier, with whom he held talks. He also met with Chancellor Friedrich Merz.
Denmark	Copenhagen	2 October	Attended the 7th European Political Community Summit.
Finland	Helsinki	16 December	Met with Prime Minister Petteri Orpo, Swedish Prime Minister Ulf Kristersson, Estonian Prime Minister Kristen Michal, Latvian Prime Minister Evika Siliņa, Lithuanian President Gitanas Nausėda, Polish Prime Minister Donald Tusk and Bulgarian Prime Minister Rosen Zhelyazkov at the Eastern Front Summit in Helsinki, where the discussion focused on Europe securing its Eastern Front at a faster pace and through joint initiatives.

=== 2026 ===
Country	Location(s)	Dates	Details
France	Paris	6 January	Dan attended the Coalition of the Willing meeting in Paris with fellow leaders.
Belgium	Antwerp, Rijkhoven	11–12 February	Dan attended the 3rd European Industry Summit. Next day participated in the informal meeting of EU heads of state and government.
Belgium	Brussels	19–20 March	Dan attended the European Council.
Cyprus	Nicosia	23–24 April	Dan attended an informal meeting of the European Council summit.
Croatia	Dubrovnik	28–29 April	Attended the 11th Three Seas Initiative summit.
Armenia	Yerevan	3–4 May	Dan attended the 8th European Political Community Summit.
Belgium	Brussels	18–19 June	Dan attended the European Council.
Poland	Jurata, Poznań	27–29 June	On 1st day, Nicușor Dan, together with Estonian President Alar Karis, Latvian President Edgars Rinkēvičs, Lithuanian President Gitanas Nausėda, Slovak President Peter Pellegrini, and Czech President Petr Pavel, met with Polish President Karol Nawrocki in Jurata for an informal meeting , where the discussion focused on preparations for the NATO Ankara Summit, strengthening European defense capabilities, and continued support for Ukraine. On next day, they participated in a commemoration event in Poznań to mark the 70th anniversary of the protests.
Turkey	Ankara	7–8 July	Dan attended the 2026 Ankara NATO summit.
France	Paris	13–14 July	Dan travelled to Paris to attend a meeting with heads of state and government within the Coalition of the Willing. Dan attended Bastille Day celebrations.
Ukraine	Kyiv	15 July	Attended the 5th Ukraine-Southeast Europe Summit.
Finland	Rovaniemi	13–14 September	Dan attended the European Arctic Summit.
Ukraine	Ivano-Frankivsk	18 September	Dan is with Prime Minister of Poland Donald Tusk and President of Serbia Aleksandar Vucic travelled the Carpathian Eight summit.
United States	New York City	21-23 September	Attended the 81th United Nations General Assembly and 6th Crimea Platform summit.
Belgium	Brussels	15–16 October	Dan attended the European Council.

== Future trips ==
Country	Location	Date	Details
Hungary	Budapest	22-23 October	Dan is plan to attend the 70th Anniversary Commemoration Ceremony Hungarian Revolution of 1956.
Ireland	Dublin	12 November	Dan is plan to attend the 9th European Political Community Summit.
Cambodia	Phnom Penh	15–16 November	Dan is scheduled to attend the 20th Organisation internationale de la Francophonie summit.
Turkey	Antalya	November	Dan is scheduled to attend the 2026 United Nations Climate Change Conference.

== Multilateral meetings ==
Multilateral meetings of the following intergovernmental organizations took place during Nicușor Dan's presidency (2025–Present).

Group	Year	
Group	2025	2026
UNGA	27 September, (United States) New York City	TBD, (United States) New York City
NATO	24–25 June, (Netherlands) The Hague	7–8 July, (Turkey) Ankara
Bucharest Nine	2 June, (Lithuania) Vilnius	13 May, (Romania) Bucharest
EPC	2 October, (Denmark) Copenhagen	4 May, (Armenia) Yerevan
EPC	2 October, (Denmark) Copenhagen	12 November, (Republic of Ireland) Dublin
Three Seas Initiative		28–29 April, (Croatia) Dubrovnik
OIF	None	TBD, Cambodia
Others	TBA	Together for peace and security summit 6 January, (France) Paris
Others	TBA	Determined to act 13 July, (France) Paris
██ = Did not attend. ██ = Future event.
