= List of international prime ministerial trips made by Micheál Martin =

This is a list of international prime ministerial trips made by Micheál Martin, the 15th Taoiseach.

== Summary ==
=== First term ===
The number of visits per country where he has travelled are:

- One visit to: Albania, Czech Republic, Finland, Germany, Japan, Lebanon, Singapore, Slovenia, Spain, Ukraine
- Two visits to: France and the United States
- Five visits to the United Kingdom
- Nine visits to Belgium

=== Second term ===
The number of visits per country where he has travelled are:

- One visit to: Armenia, Brazil, China, Cyprus, Denmark, Finland, France, Germany, Hungary, Japan, Lebanon, Montenegro, South Africa, Spain, Slovakia, Ukraine, Vatican City
- Two visits to: Poland
- Three visits to: the United States
- Four visits to: the United Kingdom
- Nine visits to: Belgium

== First term (2020–2022) ==
=== 2020 ===
#	Country	Location(s)	Dates	Details	Image
1	Belgium	Brussels	17–21 July	Martin attended a special meeting of the European Council in Brussels, where leaders negotiated the €750 billion COVID-19 recovery fund and the EU's long-term budget. The discussions focused on the balance between grants and loans, and concluded with an agreement aimed at supporting economic recovery and growth across the European Union.	
2	United Kingdom	Belfast	13 August	Met with Prime Minister Boris Johnson. They discussed the importance of working together as neighbours to defeat coronavirus, including through close collaboration between Ireland, the UK Government and the Northern Irish Executive. They agreed on the need for the international community to work together on developing rapid tests, therapeutics and vaccines.	
3	Belgium	Brussels	1–2 October	Attended a special meeting of the European Council to discuss external relations (Turkey, Belarus) and the single market.	

=== 2021 ===
#	Country	Location(s)	Dates	Details	Image
4	United Kingdom	Chequers	14 May	Met with Prime Minister Boris Johnson to discuss the future of UK–Ireland relations, including cooperation on climate change, science, and cultural initiatives. The talks also addressed the situation in Northern Ireland, with both sides emphasizing the importance of upholding the Belfast/Good Friday Agreement and maintaining smooth trade. They further discussed the legacy of the Ballymurphy inquest, cooperation in tackling COVID-19, and the need to continue close coordination to support recovery.	
5	United States	New York City	20–24 September	Attended the 76th United Nations General Assembly and chaired a UN Security Council meeting.	
6	Slovenia	Ljubljana	5–6 October	Martin attended an informal European Council and the EU-Western Balkans summit.	
7	Belgium	Brussels	21–22 October	Martin attended the European Council.	
8	United Kingdom	Glasgow	1–2 November	Martin travelled to Glasgow to attend the 2021 United Nations Climate Change Conference.	
9	Belgium	Brussels	15-16 December	Martin attended the sixth Eastern Partnership summit and a European Council meeting.	

=== 2022 ===
#	Country	Location(s)	Dates	Details	Image
10	Germany	Berlin	22 February	Meeting with Chancellor Olaf Scholz. They discussed Irish–German bilateral relations, the situation in Ukraine, economic recovery, European Union–United Kingdom relations, and shared climate objectives. They held a joint press conference after the meeting. Later in the day, Martin visited the Memorial to the Murdered Jews of Europe, where he laid a wreath and toured the museum to commemorate the victims of the Holocaust.	
11	Belgium	Brussels	24 February	Martin attended a special meeting of the European Council to discuss the Russian invasion of Ukraine.	
12	France	Versailles	10–11 March	Participation in the informal meeting of EU Heads of State and Government.	
12	United Kingdom	London	12 March	Met with Prime Minister Boris Johnson. They discussed their deep concern around the intensification of hostilities near Kyiv and condemned the attacks by Russian forces on civilians.	
13	Belgium	Brussels	24 March	Martin attended the European Council.	
14	Finland	Helsinki	12 April	Met with Prime Minister Sanna Marin to discuss EU security and defense.	
15	Lebanon	Tibnine	29 May	Visited Irish peacekeepers serving with UNIFIL	
16	France	Strasbourg	8 June	He addressed the European Parliament and took part in a ceremony unveiling a bust of John Hume. His visit focused on Ireland's role in the European Union, the importance of peace and reconciliation, and the EU's contribution to the Good Friday Agreement. The events highlighted Hume's legacy in promoting peace in Northern Ireland and emphasized continued cooperation within the EU, as well as support for democratic values and international stability.	
17	Belgium	Brussels	23–24 June	Attended the European Council summit where Ukraine and Moldova were formally granted EU candidate status.	
18	Spain	Madrid	28–30 June	Martin travelled to Madrid to attend the 32nd NATO summit.	
19	Ukraine	Kyiv	6 July	First official visit by a Taoiseach to Ukraine. Met President Volodymyr Zelenskyy during the Russian invasion of Ukraine.	
20	Japan	Tokyo	19–21 July	Met with Prime Minister Fumio Kishida to strengthen bilateral trade and digital ties.	
21	Singapore	Singapore	21–22 July	Met with Prime Minister Lee Hsien Loong and members of the Irish business community.	
22	United Kingdom	London	18–19 September	Attended the state funeral of Queen Elizabeth II.	
23	United States	New York City	22 September	Attended the General debate of the seventy-seventh session of the United Nations General Assembly.	
24	Czech Republic	Prague	6–7 October	Martin attended at Prague Castle the 1st European Political Community Summit and an informal European Council.	
25	Belgium	Brussels	20–21 October	Martin attended the European Council.	
26	Albania	Tirana	6 December	Attended EU-Western Balkans summit	
27	Belgium	Brussels	15 December	His final European Council meeting as Taoiseach during his first term. Attended just before handing over office to Leo Varadkar.	

== Second term (2025–present) ==
=== 2025 ===
#	Country	Location(s)	Dates	Details	Image
1	Poland	Oświęcim	27 January	Martin attended the commemoration of the 80th anniversary of the liberation of the Auschwitz concentration camp.	
2	Belgium	Brussels	3 February	Martin attended an informal European Council summit.	
3	United Kingdom	Liverpool	5–6 March	Attended the inaugural annual UK–Ireland Summit. Held a business round table at the Ernst & Young offices with industry leaders to discuss energy and investment; signed the "UK–Ireland 2030" strategic cooperation programme with Prime Minister Keir Starmer.	
4	United States	Austin, Washington, D.C.	14–17 March	Met President Donald Trump at the White House for the annual shamrock ceremony.	
5	Belgium	Brussels	20–21 March	Martin attended a European Council summit.	
6	France	Paris	27 March	Martin attended a meeting of the "Coalition of the willing" hosted by President Emmanuel Macron.	
7	Vatican City	Vatican City	26 April	Attended funeral of Pope Francis.	
8	Belgium	Brussels	26–27 June	Martin attended the European Council meeting.	
9	Japan	Tokyo, Osaka, Hiroshima	1–4 July 2025	Met with Prime Minister Shigeru Ishiba to discuss trade and cybersecurity. Officially opened Ireland House Tokyo and visited Expo 2025 in Osaka. In Hiroshima, he laid a wreath to mark the 80th anniversary of the atomic bombing.	
10	United Kingdom	London	12 September	Met with Prime Minister Keir Starmer. They agreed the relationship between the United Kingdom and Ireland was very strong and good progress across all areas of the relationship had been made since the UK-Ireland summit in Liverpool earlier this year.	
11	United States	New York City	26 September	Attended the General debate of the eightieth session of the United Nations General Assembly.	
12	Denmark	Copenhagen	1–2 October	Martin attended an informal European Council as well as the 7th European Political Community Summit.	
13	Brazil	Belém	6 November	Martin attended the COP30 pre-conference.	
14	South Africa	Johannesburg	22–23 November	Martin attended the 2025 G20 Johannesburg summit.	
15	United Kingdom	Cardiff	5 December	Martin attended British Irish Council and met with Prime Minister Keir Starmer.	
16	Belgium	Brussels	18–19 December	Martin attended the European Council summit.	
16	Lebanon	Naqoura	20 December	Martin visited Irish troops serving with UNIFIL in southern Lebanon, where he met peacekeepers and expressed support for their mission. He also held talks with Lebanese Prime Minister Nawaf Salam, raising concerns over the slow pace of justice in the killing of Irish soldier Seán Rooney and calling for full accountability.	

=== 2026 ===
#	Country	Location(s)	Dates	Details	Image
17	China	Beijing, Shanghai	4–8 January	Official visit to discuss trade. Met President Xi Jinping and Premier Li Qiang.	
18	Belgium	Brussels	22 January	Martin attended an informal European Council summit.	
19	Belgium	Antwerp, Rijkhoven	11–12 February	Martin attended the 3rd European Industry Summit. Next day participated in the informal meeting of EU heads of state and government.	
20	Spain	Madrid	10 March	Met with Prime Minister Pedro Sánchez.	
21	United States	Philadelphia, Washington, D.C.	14–17 March	Attended St. Patrick's Day events; met President Donald Trump.	
22	Belgium	Brussels	19–20 March	Martin attended the European Council.	
23	Finland	Helsinki	31 March	Met with Prime Minister Petteri Orpo and President Alexander Stubb to discuss preparations for Ireland's upcoming EU Presidency.	
23	Poland	Warsaw	31 March	Met with Prime Minister Donald Tusk in Warsaw to discuss European security, the war in Ukraine, and preparations for Ireland's upcoming Council of the EU Presidency. Discussions focused on strengthening bilateral ties and coordinating actions to address energy costs and economic regulations.	
24	Germany	Berlin	16 April	Met with Chancellor Friedrich Merz as part of Ireland’s preparations for its Presidency of the Council of the European Union. The leaders discussed competitiveness, the EU’s future budget, enlargement, security, rising energy prices, and the conflicts in Ukraine and the Middle East. They also exchanged views on bilateral relations between Ireland and Germany, European security, and continued support for Ukraine amid Russia’s ongoing invasion.	
25	Cyprus	Nicosia	23–24 April	Martin attended an informal meeting of the European Council summit.	
26	Armenia	Yerevan	3–4 May	Martin attended the 8th European Political Community Summit.	
27	Hungary	Budapest	4 June	Met with Prime Minister Peter Magyar as part of Ireland’s preparations for its Presidency of the Council of the European Union.	
28	Montenegro	Tivat	5 June	Attended the EU–Western Balkans Summit. They discussed progress in integrating countries of the Western Balkans into the EU, including through the EU’s Growth Plan for the Western Balkans, as well as wider regional and global issues.	
29	Belgium	Brussels	18–19 June	Martin attended the European Council.	
30	Ukraine	Kyiv	23 July	Martin met with Volodymyr Zelenskyy to discuss Russia's ongoing invasion of Ukraine, Ireland's support for Accession of Ukraine to the EU during Ireland's Presidency of the Council of the European Union. The leaders also reviewed the implementation of the Ireland–Ukraine 2030 Partnership Roadmap and discussed further humanitarian, financial, and non-lethal military assistance. During the visit, Martin also met with Prime Minister Serhii Koretskyi and Chairman of the Verkhovna Rada Ruslan Stefanchuk. He exchanged views on Ukraine's domestic reform agenda, parliamentary cooperation, and Ireland's continued support for Ukraine's European integration and long-term reconstruction.	
31	Slovakia	Bratislava	10 September	Martin attend the V4 summit and met with Prime Minister Robert Fico and President Peter Pellegrini, Prime Minister of Hungary Magyar Péter, Prime Minister of Czech Republic Andrej Babis, Prime Minister of Poland Donald Tusk.	
32	United Kingdom	Ashton-in-Makerfield	18 September	Martin met with British Prime Minister Andy Burnham at No. 10 North in Manchester, marking the first visit by an international leader to the new official residence. The two leaders reaffirmed the close UK–Ireland partnership and their commitment to the Good Friday Agreement. They discussed addressing the legacy of the Troubles and reconciliation in Northern Ireland, as well as cooperation during Ireland's presidency of the Council of the European Union and the UK's efforts to strengthen its relationship with Europe. They also expressed continued support for Ukraine and discussed preparations for the next UK–Ireland Summit, including cooperation on security and trade.	
33	United States	New York City	22-24 September	Martin is attended the 81th United Nations General Assembly.	
34	Belgium	Brussels	15–16 October	Martin attended the European Council.	

== Future trips ==
Country	Location	Date	Details
Hungary	Budapest	22-23 October	Martin is expected to attend the 70th Anniversary Commemoration Ceremony Hungarian Revolution of 1956.
Turkey	Antalya	November	Martin is scheduled to attend the 2026 United Nations Climate Change Conference.
United States	Miami	14-15 December	Martin is plan to attend the 2026 G20 Miami summit.

== Multilateral meetings ==
=== First term ===
Micheál Martin participated in the following summits during his first term:

Group	Year		
Group	2020	2021	2022
UNGA	26 September, (videoconference) (United States) New York City	20–24 September, (United States) New York City	22 September, (United States) New York City
UNCCC	none	1–2 November (United Kingdom) Glasgow	11 November (Egypt) Sharm el-Sheikh
EPC	Didn't exist		6 October, (Czech Republic) Prague

=== Second term ===
Micheál Martin participated in the following summits during his second term:

Group	Year				
Group	2025	2026	2027	2028	2029
UNGA	26 September, (United States) New York City	22–24 September, (United States) New York City	TBD, (United States) New York City	TBD, (United States) New York City	TBD, (United States) New York City
G20	22–23 November, (South Africa) Johannesburg	14–15 December, (United States) Miami	TBD, United Kingdom	TBD, South Korea	TBA
EPC	16 May, (Albania) Tirana	4 May, (Armenia) Yerevan	TBD, (Switzerland) TBD	TBD, (Azerbaijan) TBD	TBD
EPC	2 October, (Denmark) Copenhagen	12 November, (Republic of Ireland) Dublin	TBD, (Greece) TBD	TBD, (Latvia) TBD	TBD, (Netherlands) TBD
EU–CELAC	9 November, (Colombia) Santa Marta	None			
COP	5–7 November, (Brazil) Belém	November (Turkey) Antalya	TBD (Ethiopia) Addis Ababa	TBD	TBD
Others	Building a robust peace for Ukraine and Europe; 27 March, (France) Paris	Together for peace and security summit 6 January, (France) Paris	TBA	TBA	TBA
██ = Future event ██ = Did not attend / participate.
