= List of international prime ministerial trips made by Janez Janša =

List of international prime ministerial trips made by Janez Janša who served as the 5th Prime Minister of Slovenia from 3 December 2004 to 21 November 2008, from 10 February 2012 to 20 March 2013, from 13 March 2020 to 1 June 2022, from 4 June 2026.

During this term, Janša's international travel was initially heavily restricted by the COVID-19 pandemic, leading to many virtual summits. However, travel intensified in 2021 due to Slovenia's Presidency of the Council of the European Union.

== Summary ==
=== Third premiership ===
The number of visits per country where he has travelled are:

- One visit to: Austria, Germany, Hungary, Israel, Portugal and Ukraine
- Two visits to: Greece and the United Kingdom
- Three visits to: Croatia and Poland
- Four visits to: France
- Fifteen visits to: Belgium

=== Fourth premiership ===
The number of visits per country where he has travelled are:

- One visit to: France, Montenegro, Turkey, Ukraine and the United States
- Three visits to: Belgium

== Third premiership (2020-2022) ==
=== 2020 ===
#	Country	Location(s)	Dates	Details
1	Belgium	Brussels	9 July	Working visit, the first visit in the mandate of the prime minister of the 14th Government of the Republic of Slovenia. Met with Charles Michel, President of the European Council, Ursula von der Leyen, President of the European Commission, Janez Lenarčič, European Commissioner for Crisis Management and Jens Stoltenberg, Secretary General of NATO.
2	Belgium	Brussels	17-20 July	Met with Charles Michel, President of the European Council at Special session of the European Council.
3	Belgium	Brussels	1-2 September	Met with Charles Michel, President of the European Council at Special meeting of the European Council on the single market, industrial policy, external relations, the crisis in Belarus and the digital transformation.
4	Belgium	Brussels	15-16 October	Met with Charles Michel, President of the European Council at Regular session of the European Council.
5	Israel	Jerusalem	7-8 December	He was at the invitation of Prime Minister Benjamin Netanyahu. He met with the president of the Israeli Innovation Authority, Ami Appelbaum, honorary consul of Slovenia Eival Gilady and some representatives of companies operating in the field of artificial intelligence. Janša was also received by the foreign minister, Gabi Ashkenazi, and the president Reuven Rivlin.
6	Belgium	Brussels	10-11 December	Meeting of the European Council. At the request of Croatian Prime Minister Plenković, who was in self-isolation due to coronavirus infection, Janša also represented Republic of Croatia at the summit.

=== 2021 ===
#	Country	Location(s)	Dates	Details
7	Austria	Vienna	16 March	Working meeting on the distribution of vaccines among EU member states. In addition to Austrian Chancellor Sebastian Kurz, Bulgarian Prime Minister Borisov, Czech Prime Minister Babiš, Latvian Prime Minister Karinš and Croatian Prime Minister Plenković were also present via video link. Janša went to the meeting with his Bulgarian counterpart Borisov.
8	Poland	Warsaw	22 April	Working visit to Poland at the invitation of Prime Minister Morawiecki. Janša also met with the Speaker of the Polish Parliament Elżbieta Witek and the Deputy Prime Minister Jaroslaw Kaczyński. During the visit, Prime Minister Janša laid wreaths at the monuments to the Home Army and the Polish Underground State, at the Tomb of the Unknown Soldier and the monument to former Polish President Lech Kaczyński.
9	France	Paris	29 April	Working visit to the French Republic at the invitation of President Macron. Prime Minister Janša also met in Paris with Slovenian humanitarian and nominee for the Nobel Peace Prize Pedro Opeka.
10	Portugal	Porto	7 May	Met with António Costa, Prime Minister of Portugal, Pedro Sánchez, Prime Minister of Spain and Andrej Plenković, Prime Minister of Croatia at European Union Social Summit organised by the Portuguese Presidency of the Council of the European Union.
11	Greece	Delphi	10 May	Met with Kyriakos Mitsotakis, Prime Minister of Greece and Margaritis Schinas, European Commissioner for Protecting Our European Way of Life. Participation in the sixth Delphi Economic Forum. Prime Minister Janša also met with Greek Prime Minister Mitsotakis and Greek European Commissioner Schinas.
12	Belgium	Brussels	24-25 May	Met with Charles Michel, President of the European Council and Eduard Heger, Prime Minister of Slovakia. Attended the extraordinary meeting of the European Council. Among the main topics were the climate and energy package "Ready for 55", the fight against COVID-19 and sanctions against Belarus following the aviation incident when the country grounded a plane to arrest Belarusian journalist Roman Protasevich.
13	Croatia	Zagreb	29 May	At the invitation of Croatian Prime Minister Plenković, Prime Minister Janša and his wife Urško Bačovnik Janša attended the Croatian National Day ceremony.
14	Belgium	Brussels	14 June	Prime Minister Janša travelled to Brussels to attend the 31st NATO summit, where he was also accompanied by Defense Minister Matej Tonin. During the meeting in Brussels, Prime Minister Janša also held individual bilateral meetings with the prime ministers of Norway Erna Solberg, Iceland Katrín Jakobsdóttir and North Macedonia Zoran Zaev. Met with Jens Stoltenberg, NATO Secretary General.
15	Germany	Düsseldorf	23 June	Meeting with the Minister President of the German Federal State of North Rhine-Westphalia Laschet Armin Laschet.
15	Belgium	Brussels	24 June	Attended European Council meeting on the epidemiological situation and recovery from the epidemic. The working lunch was also attended by the Secretary-General of the United Nations, António Guterres and President of the European Council, Charles Michel and after the meeting, Janša had a bilateral meeting with the European Commissioner for Neighbourhood and Enlargement Olivér Várhelyi.
16	France	Paris, Strasbourg	6–7 July	Met with President Emmanuel Macron at the Élysée Palace. On next day the presentation of the Slovenian Presidency's programme to the European Parliament at the start of the plenary session and met with President of European Parliament David Sassoli. On the sidelines, Prime Minister Janša also met with European Commissioner Gabriel, EPP Group Leader Weber, Renew Europe Group Leader Cioloș, and SID Party President Zanni. After the event, Prime Minister Janša received an award from the French Jewish community in the Strasbourg synagogue for his support for Israel.
17	Poland	Karpacz	9 September	Prime Minister Janša met with Prime Minister Mateusz Morawiecki attended the 30th Economic Forum in Poland, where he also received the 2020 Central and Eastern European Personality of the Year award.
18	Greece	Athens	17 September	Participation in the 8th MED-7 Summit hosted by Prime Minister Kyriakos Mitsotakis, which was also joined by Slovenia and Croatia.
19	Hungary	Budapest	23 September	Met with Viktor Orbán, Prime Minister of Hungary, Milorad Dodik, Member of the Presidency of Bosnia and Herzegovina, Andrej Babiš, Prime Minister of the Czech Republic, Aleksandar Vučić, President of Serbia and Mike Pence, former vice president of the US. Prime Minister Janša attended the 4th Demographic Forum in Budapest. Janša was accompanied in Budapest by the Minister of Labor, Family, Social Affairs and Equal Opportunities Janez Cigler Kralj.
20	United Kingdom	London	30 September	At the invitation of Boris Johnson, Prime Minister Janša paid a working visit to the United Kingdom of Great Britain and Northern Ireland. He also met with the newly appointed Foreign Secretary Liz Truss, Secretary of State James Cleverly and the Head of the EU Delegation to the United Kingdom João Vale de Almeida.
21	Croatia	Tuhelj	8 October	Participation in the TOURISM 365 tourism conference. Prime Minister Janša also met bilaterally with Prime Minister Andrej Plenković on the sidelines of the event.
22	Belgium	Brussels	21 October	Attended regular meeting of the European Council.
23	Belgium	Brussels	27-28 October	Prime Minister Janša met with the president of the European Council Charles Michel at a working dinner, where they discussed the key dossiers of the Slovenian Presidency of the Council of the European Union. The following day, Janša met separately with the European Commissioner for Justice Didier Reynders and the European Commissioner for Neighbourhood and Enlargement Olivér Várhelyi.
24	United Kingdom	Glasgow	1-2 November	Prime Minister Janša attended the COP26, where he held several bilateral meetings.
25	Belgium	Brussels	15-17 December	Janša attended the Eastern Partnership (CORLEAP) meeting. He also held several bilateral meetings. The evening before the meeting, the prime minister also attended a dinner with the leaders of Ukraine, Moldova and Georgia, hosted by the president of Lithuania, Gitanas Nausėda. Prime Minister Janša also attended a joint press conference with Charles Michel and Ursula von der Leyen on the achievements of the Slovenian presidency.

=== 2022 ===
#	Country	Location(s)	Dates	Details
26	France	Paris	16 February	Participation in a working dinner on the situation in the Sahel and an informal exchange of views on the further engagement of the European Union Member States with a military presence in Mali and in the Sahel.
26	Belgium	Brussels	17-18 February	Prime Minister Janša attended the informal meeting of the European Council, and then the European Union-African Union summit. The prime minister also held several bilateral meetings with José Maria Neves, President of Cape Verde, Abiy Ahmed, President of Ethiopia, Mateusz Morawiecki, Prime Minister of Poland and Moussa Faki Mahamat, Chairperson of the African Union Commission.
27	Belgium	Brussels	24 February	Attended the extraordinary meeting of the European Council on the Russian attack on Ukraine, where the leaders of the member states discussed sanctions against the Russian Federation.
28	France	Versailles	10-11 March	Attended informal European Council meeting hosted by President Emmanuel Macron during his presidency in Versailles.
29	Ukraine	Kyiv	15-16 March	Together with the prime ministers of the Czech Republic Petr Fiala and Poland Mateusz Morawiecki during the Russian invasion, where they met with the president, Volodymyr Zelenskyy. It was the first high-level visit to Ukraine since the start of the war.
30	Belgium	Brussels	24-25 March	Janša attended an extraordinary NATO summit, primarily dedicated to Russian aggression in Ukraine and current developments in NATO related to the situation in Ukraine. Attended the European Council meeting, which was also attended by the president of the United States of America, Joe Biden. The leaders discussed mainly the war in Ukraine and its consequences.
31	Croatia	Zagreb	28 March	Meeting with Prime Minister Andrej Plenković on current bilateral and global political relations.
32	Poland	Warsaw	5 May	Participation in the Donors' Conference for Ukraine, co-organized by Poland and Sweden in cooperation with the president of the European Council, Charles Michel, and the president of the European Commission, Ursula von der Leyen. On the sidelines of the event, Janša held a bilateral meeting with Croatian prime minister Andrej Plenković, Polish prime minister Mateusz Morawiecki and Swedish prime minister Magdalena Andersson.
33	Belgium	Brussels	30-31 May	Attended extraordinary European Council meeting on the situation in Ukraine, defence, energy and food security.

== Fourth premiership (2026-Present) ==
=== 2026 ===
#	Country	Location(s)	Dates	Details
1	Montenegro	Tivat	5 June	Attended the EU–Western Balkans Summit. They discussed progress in integrating countries of the Western Balkans into the EU, including through the EU’s Growth Plan for the Western Balkans, as well as wider regional and global issues.
2	Belgium	Brussels	18–19 June	Attended the European Council.
3	Turkey	Ankara	7–8 July	Janša attended the 2026 Ankara NATO summit.
4	France	Paris	13—14 July	Janša travelled to Paris to attend a meeting with heads of state and government within the Coalition of the Willing. Janša attended Bastille Day celebrations.
5	Ukraine	Kyiv	15 July	Attended the 5th Ukraine-Southeast Europe Summit.
6	Belgium	Brussels	14 September	Met with NATO secretary general Mark Rutte.
7	United States	New York City	24 September	Janša attended the 81st United Nations General Assembly.
8	Belgium	Brussels	15–16 October	Janša attended the European Council.

== Multilateral meetings ==
=== First Premiership ===
Janez Janša participated in the following summits during his first premiership:

Group	Year			
Group	2005	2006	2007	2008
NATO	22 February, (Belgium) Brussels	28–29 November, (Latvia) Riga	none	2–4 April, (Romania) Bucharest

=== Second Premiership ===
Janez Janša participated in the following summits during his second premiership:

Group	Year	
Group	2012	2013
NATO	20–21 May, (United States) Chicago	none
EU–CELAC	none	26–27 January, (Chile) Santiago

=== Third Premiership ===
Janez Janša participated in the following summits during his third premiership:

Group	Year	
Group	2021	2022
NATO	14 June, (Belgium) Brussels	24 March, (Belgium) Brussels
MED9	17 September, (Greece) Athens	
UNCCC	1–2 November (United Kingdom) Glasgow	

=== Fourth Premiership ===
Janez Janša participated in the following summits during his fourth premiership:

Group	Year			
Group	2026	2027	2028	2029
UNGA	24 September, (United States) New York City	TBD (United States) New York City	TBD (United States) New York City	TBD (United States) New York City
NATO	7–8 July, (Turkey) Ankara	TBD, (Albania) Tirana	TBD	TBD
MED9	7 October, (Croatia) Split	TBD	TBD	TBD
EPC		TBD, (Switzerland) TBD	TBD, (Azerbaijan) TBD	TBD
EPC	12 November, (Republic of Ireland) Dublin	TBD, (Greece) TBD	TBD, (Latvia) TBD	TBD, (Netherlands) TBD
██ = Future event

== See also ==
- List of international prime ministerial trips made by Robert Golob
- Foreign relations of Slovenia
