= List of international prime ministerial trips made by Robert Golob =

This is a list of international prime ministerial trips made by Robert Golob, who served as the 13th Prime Minister of Slovenia from 1 June 2022 to 4 June 2026.

== Summary ==
Robert Golob has visited 18 countries during his tenure as prime minister. The number of visits per country where Golob has traveled are:

- One visit to Algeria, Bosnia and Herzegovina, Croatia, Cyprus, Czech Republic, Jordan, Lithuania, Luxembourg, Malta and Ukraine
- Two visits to Albania and Austria
- Three visits to Spain and the United States and Vatican City
- Five visits to Germany
- Nine visits to France
- Nineteen visits to Belgium

== 2022 ==
Country	Location(s)	Dates	Details
Belgium	Brussels	16–17 June	Golob met with European Council president Charles Michel on the second day of his visit to Brussels and welcomed the European Commission's proposal to grant EU candidate status to Ukraine.
Belgium	Brussels	23 June	Participation in the European Council meeting, at which members discussed, among other things, the European future of the Western Balkan countries and the granting of candidate status to Ukraine and Moldova.
Spain	Madrid	28–30 June	Golob attended the NATO summit.
Germany	Berlin	12 July	Met with Chancellor Olaf Scholz.
France	Paris	1 September	Met with President Emmanuel Macron. They exchanged views on the current crisis in Ukraine and agreed that the European Union's response must be united in its support for the Ukrainian people in their fight for freedom. They stressed that, when implementing sanctions, it is necessary to seek solutions that do not affect the most vulnerable countries. They discussed the rising cost of living, noting that both countries are taking similar measures to regulate energy and food prices, with private households at the forefront of their concerns, the potential of nuclear technology for a green breakthrough and agreed to work more closely on tackling the issue of energy prices. They agreed to work towards Europe giving the Western Balkans a clear view on their prospects for accession. In this regard, it is important that progress be made on securing EU candidate status for Bosnia and Herzegovina before the December European Summit.
Czech Republic	Prague	6–7 October	Golob travelled to Prague to attend an informal meeting of the European Council and the inaugural meeting of the European Political Community.
Belgium	Brussels	20–21 October	Participation in the European Council.
Albania	Tirana	6 December	Attended EU-Western Balkans summit
Spain	Alicante	9 December	Golob attended the 9th summit of EU-MED9 member states, where the leaders discussed the consequences of the war in Ukraine, energy security, the response to current economic challenges, and strengthening cooperation in the Mediterranean.
France	Strasbourg	13 December	Golob addressed the MEPs at the plenary session.
Belgium	Brussels	15 December	Participation in the regular meeting of the European Council, this time on further assistance to Ukraine, energy, the competitiveness of the European Union on a global scale, and the Union's enlargement policy.
Vatican City	Vatican City	17 December	Met with Pope Francis.

== 2023 ==
Country	Location(s)	Dates	Details
Bosnia and Herzegovina	Sarajevo	13 March	Official bilateral visit, where he met with the state leadership, followed the European Council's decision in December to grant Bosnia and Herzegovina (BiH) candidate status for membership in the Union.
Belgium	Brussels	23–24 March	Participation in the regular meeting of the European Council, regarding the following topics: Russian aggression in Ukraine, the competitiveness of European industry, strengthening the EU single market, and the state of the European economy and energy.
Ukraine	Kyiv, Bucha	31 March	Golob together with Slovak prime minister Eduard Heger and Croatian prime minister Andrej Plenković arrived in Ukraine on the anniversary of the liberation of Bucha. Met with President Volodymyr Zelenskyy
Moldova	Mimi Castle, Bulboaca, Chișinău	1 June	Golob travelled to Moldova to attend the 2nd European Political Community Summit.
Austria	Vienna	13 June	first official visit to the Republic of Austria. Discussions took place on bilateral relations between the two countries, energy, the future of the Schengen area, the war in Ukraine and the situation in the Western Balkans, as well as the situation of the Slovenian national community in the Republic of Austria.
Belgium	Brussels	30 June	Golob attended the European Council.
Lithuania	Vilnius	11–12 July	Golob travelled to Vilnius to attend the 2023 NATO Vilnius summit.
Croatia	Zagreb	14 July	Met with Prime Minister Andrej Plenković. It was his first official visit to Croatia. They discussed bilateral and economic relations between the two countries, energy cooperation and prevention of illegal migration. Two important agreements were also signed - on cross-border cooperation in the provision of emergency health care and solidarity measures to protect the gas supply.
Belgium	Brussels	17–18 July	Attended the 3rd EU–CELAC summit.
Luxembourg	Luxembourg City	13 September	Met with Prime Minister Xavier Bettel. They signed a memorandum on strengthening cooperation on space activities, discussed current foreign policy issues and advocated the preservation of the Schengen area.
Malta	Valletta	29 September	Golob attended the 10th EU Med summit.
Spain	Granada	5 October	Golob attended the 3rd European Political Community Summit.
Belgium	Brussels	26–27 October	Attended the European Council meeting.
France	Paris	13 December	Met with President Emmanuel Macron at the Élysée Palace.
Belgium	Brussels	13–15 December	Golob attended the EU-Western Balkans summit followed by the European Council.

== 2024 ==
Country	Location(s)	Dates	Details
France	Paris	5 January	Golob, together with the first prime minister of the Republic of Slovenia, Lojze Peterle, attended the commemoration ceremony for the death of former president of the European Commission, Jacques Delors.
Belgium	Brussels	1 February	Attended the extraordinary meeting of the European Council.
Germany	Munich	16–18 February	Attended the 60th Munich Security Conference. On the sidelines of which Prime Minister Golob held several meetings, including with US vice president Kamala Harris.
France	Paris	26 February	Participation in a meeting of EU leaders on the topic of the international community's next steps towards Ukraine.
Belgium	Brussels	21 March	Golob attended the European Council summit. He travelled to NATO headquarters to meet NATO Secretary General Jens Stoltenberg. They mainly discussed support for Ukraine, the developments in Gaza, the situation in the Western Balkans, with a focus on Bosnia and Herzegovina, burden-sharing within the alliance and preparations for the NATO summit to be held in Washington in July.
Austria	Vienna	12 April	Participation in the leaders' working dinner on the future EU Strategic Agenda 2024-2029.
Belgium	Brussels	17–18 April	Participation in an extraordinary meeting of the European Council.
Algeria		27 May	Bilateral visit of Prime Minister Golob to Algeria, the purpose of which is to continue the intensive and friendly relations between the two countries. Accompanied by Minister Bojan Kumro, a contract for the extension and increase of gas supplies was also signed between the Slovenian company Geoplin and the Algerian company Sonatrach.
Jordan	Sweimeh	11 June	Golob attended an international conference entitled "A Call to Action: An Urgent Humanitarian Response for Gaza". The purpose of the meeting was to strengthen international efforts to alleviate the humanitarian crisis in Gaza, including an agreement on a ceasefire and the release of hostages, increasing the delivery of humanitarian aid, and providing essential services to the civilian population.
Belgium	Brussels	17 June	Golob attended an informal European Council summit.
Germany	Munich	19–20 June	Golob's working visit to Munich, focused on upgrading bilateral relations and current European issues. The prime minister also watched the European Football Championship match between Slovenia and Serbia.
Belgium	Brussels	27–28 June	Participation in the regular June meeting of the European Council.
Germany	Frankfurt	1 July	Golob, accompanied by the Portuguese prime minister, the president of the Football Association of Slovenia, and the president of the Portuguese Football Federation, watched the Euro 2024 round of 16 match between Slovenia and Portugal.
United States	Washington D.C.	9–11 July	Golob attended 2024 NATO summit together with Foreign Minister Tanja Fajon and Defense Minister Marjan Šarec. It was held in the spirit of marking the 75th anniversary of the alliance, as well as its key achievements and challenges.
United Kingdom	Woodstock	18 July	Golob attended the 4th European Political Community Summit
France	Paris	26 July	Golob travelled to Paris to attend the 2024 Summer Olympics opening ceremony.
United States	New York City	27 September	Attended the General debate of the seventy-ninth session of the United Nations General Assembly.
Cyprus	Paphos	11 October	Golob travelled to Paphos to attend the 11th EU Med summit along with Southern European leaders.
United States	Washington D.C.	22 October	Golob holds a bilateral meeting with US president Joe Biden at the White House.

== 2025 ==
Country	Location(s)	Dates	Details
Belgium	Brussels	3 February	Golob attended an informal European Council summit.
Belgium	Brussels	20–21 March	Golob attended a European Council summit.
France	Paris	27 March	Golob attended a meeting of the "Coalition of the willing" hosted by President Macron.
Vatican City	Vatican City	26 April	Golob attended the funeral of Pope Francis.
Albania	Tirana	16 May	Attended the 6th European Political Community Summit.
Vatican City	Vatican City	18 May	Golob attended Papal inauguration of Pope Leo XIV.
Netherlands	The Hague	24–25 June	Golob attended the 2025 NATO summit.
Belgium	Brussels	26–27 June	Golob attended the European Council.
Denmark	Copenhagen	2 October	Attended the 7th European Political Community Summit.
Germany	Berlin	28 November	Met with Chancellor Friedrich Merz.

== 2026 ==
Country	Location(s)	Dates	Details
France	Paris	6 January	Golob attended the Coalition of the Willing meeting in Paris with fellow leaders.
Belgium	Brussels	22 January	Attended the extraordinary meeting of the European Council. The main purpose of this meeting is a strategic discussion about recent events concerning transatlantic relations and the European Union's response to these developments.
France	Paris	27 February	Met with President Emmanuel Macron. They discussed the strengthening of bilateral cooperation between the two countries, particularly in the areas of the economy and advanced technologies. They exchanged views on the key issues that will be at the forefront of the spring meeting of the European Council, including deepening the EU internal market and strengthening the competitiveness and strategic autonomy of the European Union. Following working visits in 2022 and 2023, this is the third bilateral visit by Prime Minister Golob to France. President Macron visited Slovenia in October 2025.
Belgium	Brussels	19–20 March	Golob attended the European Council.

== Multilateral meetings ==
Robert Golob participated in the following summits during his premiership:

Group	Year				
Group	2022	2023	2024	2025	2026
NATO	28–30 June, (Spain) Madrid	11–12 July, (Lithuania) Vilnius	9–11 July, (United States) Washington, D.C.	24–25 June, (Netherlands) The Hague	
EU–CELAC	None	17–18 July, (Belgium) Brussels	None	9–10 November, (Colombia) Santa Marta	None
EPC	6 October, (Czech Republic) Prague	1 June, (Moldova) Bulboaca	18 July, (United Kingdom) Woodstock	16 May, (Albania) Tirana	4 May, (Armenia) Yerevan
EPC	6 October, (Czech Republic) Prague	5 October, (Spain) Granada	7 November^{[a]}, (Hungary) Budapest	2 October, (Denmark) Copenhagen	
MED9	9 December, (Spain) Alicante	29 September, (Malta) Mdina	11 October, (Cyprus) Paphos	20 October, (Slovenia) Portorož	
Others	None	None	None	Building a robust peace for Ukraine and Europe; 27 March, (France) Paris	Together for peace and security summit 6 January, (France) Paris
██ = Future event ██ = Did not attend / participate.^aWithdrew for other engagements
