= EU-Armenia Comprehensive and Enhanced Partnership Agreement =

Treaty between the European Union and Armenia

EU-Armenia Comprehensive and Enhanced Partnership Agreement (CEPA)
Comprehensive and Enhanced Partnership Agreement between the European Union and the European Atomic Energy Community and their Member States, of the one part, and the Republic of Armenia, of the other part
- Map of Europe with the European Union in green and Armenia in orange.
- Type: Comprehensive and Enhanced Partnership Agreement
- Context: Framework for cooperation between the EU and a non-EU country
- Signed: November 24, 2017; 8 years ago
- Location: Brussels, Belgium
- Effective: March 1, 2021; 5 years ago
- Condition: Ratification by all signatories
- Replaces: EU–Armenia Partnership and Cooperation Agreement
- Signatories: European Union (and the -then- 28 EU member states); European Atomic Energy Community; Armenia
- Ratifiers: 31 / 31
- Depositary: General Secretariat of the Council of the European Union
- Languages: All 24 official Languages of the European Union and Armenian

The EU-Armenia Comprehensive and Enhanced Partnership Agreement or CEPA is a partnership agreement between the European Union and Armenia. The agreement advances the bilateral relations between the European Union and Armenia to a new, partnership level and regulates cooperation in political and economic sectors, while enhancing trade relations. The agreement develops these areas further, providing a long-term basis for integrating and strengthening EU–Armenia relations. The agreement is also designed to bring Armenian laws and regulations gradually closer to the EU acquis.

== Background ==
Armenia's relations with the EU had previously been governed by the Partnership and Cooperation Agreement (PCA) (signed in 1996 and in force since 1999), which served as the legal framework for EU–Armenia bilateral relations. Armenia and the EU began negotiating a new and more complex Association Agreement, which had included a Deep and Comprehensive Free Trade Area agreement, to replace the old PCA in July 2010. The EU Advisory Group to the Republic of Armenia was tasked to support the government of Armenia's efforts to implement reforms ahead of signing an Association Agreement with the EU. Negotiations were finalized in July 2013 and Armenia (along with Georgia, Moldova and Ukraine) was set to sign the new Association Agreement with the EU during the Eastern Partnership summit in November 2013. However, the government of Armenia, led by former President Serzh Sargsyan had suddenly broken off negotiations to pursue membership in the Russian-led Eurasian Economic Union. Other political parties in Armenia criticized the governments last-minute decision to cancel the Association Agreement with the EU and vocally opposed Armenia's membership in the Eurasian Union. Many criticized Russia for pressuring President Sargsyan to abandon the deal with the EU.

Following a period of brief uncertainty between Armenia and the EU, bilateral negotiations resumed on restructuring the relationship. In January 2015 the EU commissioner for European Neighbourhood Policy and Enlargement, Johannes Hahn stated that the EU was willing to sign a revised Association Agreement with Armenia, but that any new deal would exclude a free trade agreement as that would contradict Armenia's membership in the Eurasian Customs Union. Renewed negotiations were launched in December 2015. After extensive negotiations, Armenia and the EU finalized the Comprehensive and Enhanced Partnership Agreement during a ceremony in Brussels. The new Comprehensive and Enhanced Partnership Agreement will expand and broaden the scope of relations between the EU and Armenia. It was signed by Armenia and all EU member states on 24 November 2017. The agreement was fully ratified by all 31 parties on 25 January 2021 and officially entered into force on 1 March 2021.

The Standing Committee on European Integration is responsible for ensuring the terms and agreements of CEPA are implemented.

== Agreement provisions ==
Signing ceremony of CEPA by the EU and Armenia in Brussels, November 2017.

The agreement constitutes an important step towards the increased political and economic involvement of the European Union in the South Caucasus. The scope of the new agreement is comprehensive and covers a wide range of cooperation in economic, trade and political areas. The agreement develops these areas further; providing a long-term basis for further deepening EU–Armenia relations. By intensifying political dialogue and improving cooperation in a broad range of areas, the agreement lays the foundations for more effective bilateral engagement with Armenia. Furthermore, the agreement seeks to foster result-oriented and practical cooperation between all parties for achieving peace, security and stability on the European continent.

The agreement includes the EU's standard political clauses on democracy, justice, and human rights. It also contains provisions on cooperation in areas such as transport and infrastructure, energy, health, the environment, climate change, taxation, education and culture, employment and social affairs, banking and insurance, media freedom, minority rights, industrial policy, agriculture and rural development, tourism, research and innovation, mining, and counter-terrorism. In addition, it covers other extensive democratic reforms, legal cooperation, strengthening the rule of law, combating money laundering, and fighting organized crime and corruption.

The agreement also contains a substantive trade title with important commitments in several trade policy areas. These will improve conditions for bilateral EU–Armenia trade, while taking full account of Armenia's obligations as a member of the Eurasian Union. They will ensure a better regulatory environment for economic operators in areas such as trade in services and goods, setting up and running companies, capital movements, government procurement and intellectual property rights, sustainable development, and competition. The agreement encourages Armenian companies to sell more goods and services to the EU and EU companies to open subsidiaries in Armenia, which will contribute to economic growth and job creation. The Comprehensive and Enhanced Partnership Agreement can be seen as a “lite” version of an EU Free Trade Agreement, in which 96% of Armenian goods may enter the EU's single market with zero tariffs. As of 2020, the EU is Armenia's biggest export market.

The agreement also supports enhancing mobility between citizens of the EU and Armenia, while reconfirming the opening of negotiations on visa-free travel for Armenian citizens to the Schengen Area.

Since the signing of CEPA, Armenia was under negotiations to join the European Common Aviation Area. The agreement to establish a Common Aviation Area between the EU and Armenia removes market restrictions and associates Armenia to the EU internal aviation market by harmonizing its aviation legislation with EU standards by implementing a large part of EU aviation rules. On 15 November 2021, Armenia and the EU finalized negotiations of the Common Aviation Area Agreement between the two sides. The benefits of the agreement include new air transport opportunities, more direct connections and economic benefits to both sides. All EU airlines will be able to operate direct flights from anywhere in the EU to any airport in Armenia, and vice versa for Armenian airlines. All limitations and restrictions on flights between Armenia and the EU will be removed.

== Ratification ==
In order for CEPA to enter into force, all member states of the European Union, the EU itself, and the European Atomic Energy Community (EAEC) had to ratify the agreement. As of 25 January 2021, all 31 parties have fully ratified CEPA. This includes:

- Armenia
- Austria
- Belgium
- Bulgaria
- Croatia
- Cyprus
- Czech Republic
- Denmark
- Estonia
- European Union
- (European Union) EAEC
- Finland
- France
- Germany
- Greece
- Hungary
- Ireland
- Italy
- Latvia
- Lithuania
- Luxembourg
- Malta
- Netherlands
- Poland
- Portugal
- Romania
- Slovakia
- Slovenia
- Spain
- Sweden
- United Kingdom

== Reactions ==
- Armenia: Deputy Prime Minister, Mher Grigoryan stated, "The agreement boosted Armenia–EU ties and also served as the foundation for various areas for outlining future reforms. Its implementation is one of the top priorities of our government."
- Bulgaria: The Deputy Prime Minister of Bulgaria, Ekaterina Zakharieva, stated, "Bulgaria attached special importance to the full entry into force of the Armenia–EU Comprehensive and Enhanced Partnership Agreement."
- Estonia: The Foreign Minister of Estonia, Eva-Maria Liimets, confirmed Estonia's willingness to give new impetus to the cooperation in spheres of mutual interest with Armenia and stressed that CEPA will be an effective toolkit for the implementation of democratic, human rights and rule of law reforms in Armenia.
- European Union: The Vice-President of the European Commission, Josep Borrell stated, "The agreement sends a strong signal that the EU and Armenia are committed to supporting democratic principles, the rule of law, and a broad reform agenda. CEPA plays an important role for the modernization of Armenia, in particular through legislative approximation to EU norms in many sectors."
- France: The French Foreign Ministry announced that France welcomes the conclusion of negotiations on the EU–Armenia CEPA. The Ministry stated that, "CEPA will create new opportunities for trade and investment while protecting French and European geographical indications."
- Germany: During a meeting with Armenian Prime Minister in Berlin, the German Bundestag President Wolfgang Schäuble advised he was pleased with the ratification of CEPA and remains supportive of Armenia’s judicial reform. In return, Armenian Prime Minister stated, "Armenia has recorded tangible progress in its international ratings in regards to democracy. Our government sets another important goal in developing relations with Germany."
- Lithuania: Lithuania’s Deputy Foreign Minister Arnoldas Pranckevičius stated, "CEPA can bring Armenia higher standards of democracy and rule of law, greener environment and more business opportunities. It is a cause for celebration for Lithuania. Because we are stronger together,” he noted.
- Russia: Zvezda TV, the channel of the Russian Ministry of Defense, claimed that "Armenia was going to associate itself with the EU, just like Ukraine." After official complaints from Yerevan, Zvezda TV’s president sent a letter of apology to the Armenian ambassador in Russia.
- Spain: The Minister of Foreign Affairs of Spain, Arancha González Laya, expressed confidence that the full and effective implementation of the CEPA will give a tangible new impetus to the promotion of mutually beneficial cooperation between Armenia, the EU, and EU member states.
- Sweden: The Swedish embassy in Yerevan proclaimed that, "The agreement we have signed will have a real impact on people's lives, a positive one, both in Armenia and in the European Union."

== See also ==
- Accession of Armenia to the European Union
- Armenia–European Union relations
- Armenia in the Council of Europe
- Eastern Partnership
- Euronest Parliamentary Assembly
- European Integration
- European Neighbourhood Policy
- European Union Mission in Armenia
- EU Strategy for the South Caucasus
- Foreign relations of Armenia
- Foreign relations of the European Union
- Georgia–European Union Association Agreement
- Moldova–European Union Association Agreement
- Potential enlargement of the European Union
- Ukraine–European Union Association Agreement
