= European Coalition Against Drugs =

- Abbreviation: ECAD
- Formation: 2 October 2025
- Chairs: Emmanuel Macron; Giorgia Meloni
- Parent organization: European Political Community

The European Coalition Against Drugs (ECAD) is a platform within the European Political Community (EPC) which was established during the seventh EPC summit held in Denmark in October 2025.

== Aims ==
The European Coalition Against Drugs aims to:

- strengthen international cooperation in combating drug trafficking, including new-generation synthetic drugs
- promote prevention, treatment, and rehabilitation policies for those affected by addiction

== Participating states and organisations ==
The following countries and organisations agreed to the joint statement establishing the European Coalition Against Drugs in October 2025:

- Albania
- Andorra
- Armenia
- Bosnia and Herzegovina
- Bulgaria
- Council of Europe
- Croatia
- Cyprus
- Denmark
- France
- Hungary
- Iceland
- Ireland
- Italy
- Kosovo
- Latvia
- Lithuania
- Luxembourg
- Malta
- Moldova
- Monaco
- Montenegro
- Netherlands
- North Macedonia
- Norway
- Poland
- Portugal
- Romania
- San Marino
- Serbia
- Slovakia
- Slovenia
- Spain
- Sweden
- United Kingdom

== Meetings ==
Meetings of the European Coalition Against Drugs take place on the sidelines of summits of the European Political Community.

No	Date	Host country	Host city	Chairs
1	2 October 2025	Denmark	Copenhagen	Emmanuel Macron; Giorgia Meloni
2	4 May 2026	Armenia	Yerevan	Emmanuel Macron; Giorgia Meloni
