= EU–Armenia Partnership and Cooperation Agreement =

Treaty between the European Union and Armenia

Partnership and Cooperation Agreement between the European Communities and their Member States, of the one part, and the Republic of Armenia, of the other part
- First Page of the Agreement
- Type: Partnership and Cooperation Agreement
- Signed: April 22, 1996
- Location: Luxembourg, Luxembourg City
- Effective: July 1, 1999
- Replaced by: Armenia–EU Comprehensive and Enhanced Partnership Agreement
- Expiry: February 28, 2021
- Signatories: European Coal and Steel Community (followed by the European Union as of July 2002); European Atomic Energy Community; Armenia
- Depositary: Council of the European Union-General Secretariat
- Languages: Bulgarian, Spanish, Danish, German, Greek, English, French, Italian, Dutch, Portuguese, Romanian, Finnish, Swedish, Armenian

The EU–Armenia Partnership and Cooperation Agreement (PCA) was a Partnership and Cooperation Agreement between the European Coal and Steel Community (and later the European Union) and Armenia. It was signed in Luxembourg and entered into force on 1 July 1999. The agreement served as the legal framework for EU–Armenia bilateral relations for 21 years, until its termination on 28 February 2021. The PCA was replaced by the Armenia–EU Comprehensive and Enhanced Partnership Agreement (CEPA), a more comprehensive and complex agreement, which entered into force on 1 March 2021.

== Background ==
Armenia regained its independence following the collapse of the Soviet Union in 1991. Following which, independent Armenia sought to develop stronger relations with European states, and in particular, with the European Coal and Steel Community (ECSC). The Partnership and Cooperation Agreement was designed to establish deeper partnership between the ECSC and Armenia, especially in the areas of trade, commerce, and economic cooperation. The agreement was also aimed at further strengthening political ties between the ECSC and Armenia. (Note: Partnership and Cooperation Agreement between the European Communities and their Member States, of the one part, and the Republic of Armenia, of the other part - Protocol on mutual assistance between authorities in customs matters - Final Act - Joint Declarations - Exchange of Letters in relation to the establishment of companies - Declaration of the French Government. No longer in force, Date of end of validity: 28/02/2021; Repealed by 22018A0126(01).)

== Supposed benefits of PCA ==
Provisions in the agreement supported the territorial integrity of Armenia and its progressive integration into the open international system, maintaining peace and security throughout Europe, safeguarding the rule of law and human rights, promoting democratic reforms and free elections, and developing a liberalized free market economy. The agreement also encouraged Armenia to maintain peaceful and constructive relations with its South Caucasus neighbors, develop closer relations with other European institutions, supporting Armenia's membership in the Energy Charter Treaty, and to increase trade and investment between ECSC members and Armenia.

== Cancellation of Association Agreement ==
Armenia and the EU began negotiating a new and more complex Association Agreement, which had included a Deep and Comprehensive Free Trade Area agreement, to replace the PCA in July 2010. The EU Advisory Group to the Republic of Armenia was tasked to support the government of Armenia to implement reforms ahead of signing an Association Agreement with the EU. Negotiations were finalized in July 2013 and Armenia (along with Georgia, Moldova and Ukraine) was set to sign the new Association Agreement with the EU during the Eastern Partnership summit in November 2013. However, the Government of Armenia, led by former President Serzh Sargsyan had suddenly broken off negotiations to pursue membership in the Russian-led Eurasian Economic Union. As such, no Association Agreement was signed and the PCA was maintained.

The European Commission and Armenia later agreed to restart negotiations on a new agreement that would eventually replace the PCA. Former European Commissioner for Neighbourhood and Enlargement Štefan Füle stated that, "the EU stands ready to continue developing ties with Armenia through a new legal framework." While Serzh Sargsyan confirmed that his administration remained committed to deepening ties with the EU and implementing large-scale reforms required for that.

== Expiration of PCA and beginning of CEPA ==
In December 2015, Armenia and the EU began renegotiating a new agreement on bilateral relations. Following extensive negotiations, the Armenia–EU Comprehensive and Enhanced Partnership Agreement was signed by Armenia and all EU member states on 24 November 2017 and ratified on 25 January 2021. The PCA expired on 28 February 2021 and the new CEPA officially entered into force on 1 March 2021.

== See also ==
- Armenia–European Union relations
- Euronest Parliamentary Assembly
- European Integration
- European Neighbourhood Policy
- Foreign relations of Armenia
- Foreign relations of the European Union
- Potential enlargement of the European Union
