= 10th European Political Community Summit =

European Political Community Summit

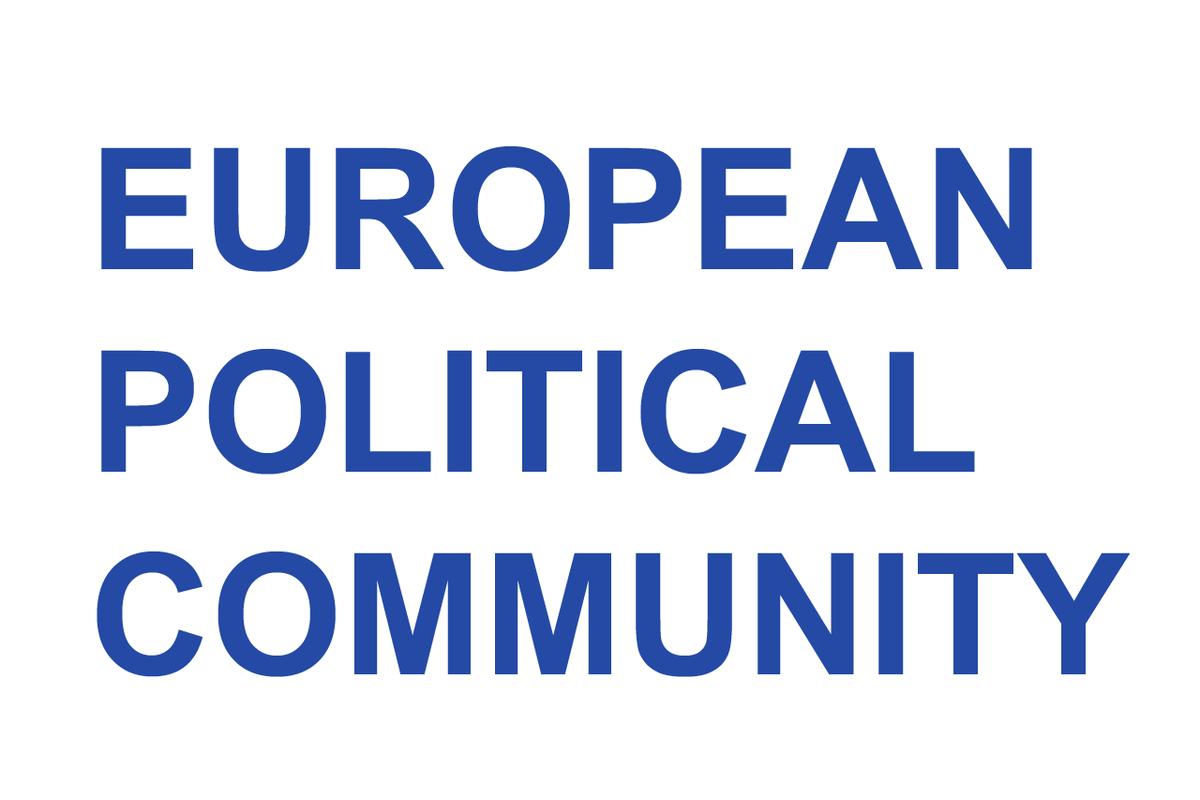
- Host country: Switzerland
- Date: April 2027
- Cities: Zurich
- Venues: The Circle Conference Centre
- Follows: 9th
- Precedes: 11th

The Tenth European Political Community Summit is a meeting of the European Political Community to be held in April 2027 in Switzerland.

== Background ==
Switzerland was named as host of the 10th EPC summit in May 2025. In September 2026, it was announced that the summit will be held at The Circle Conference Centre in Zurich on a date in April 2027.

== Participants ==
=== Participating states and organisations ===
Countries participating in the European Political Community

The summit is expected to be attended by the heads of state or government of the states participating in the European Political Community along with the High Representative of the Union for Foreign Affairs and Security Policy, the President of the European Council, the President of the European Commission and the President of the European Parliament.
