= 7th European Political Community Summit =

European Political Community Summit

7th European Political Community Summit Syvende møde i Det Europæisk Politiske Fællesskab
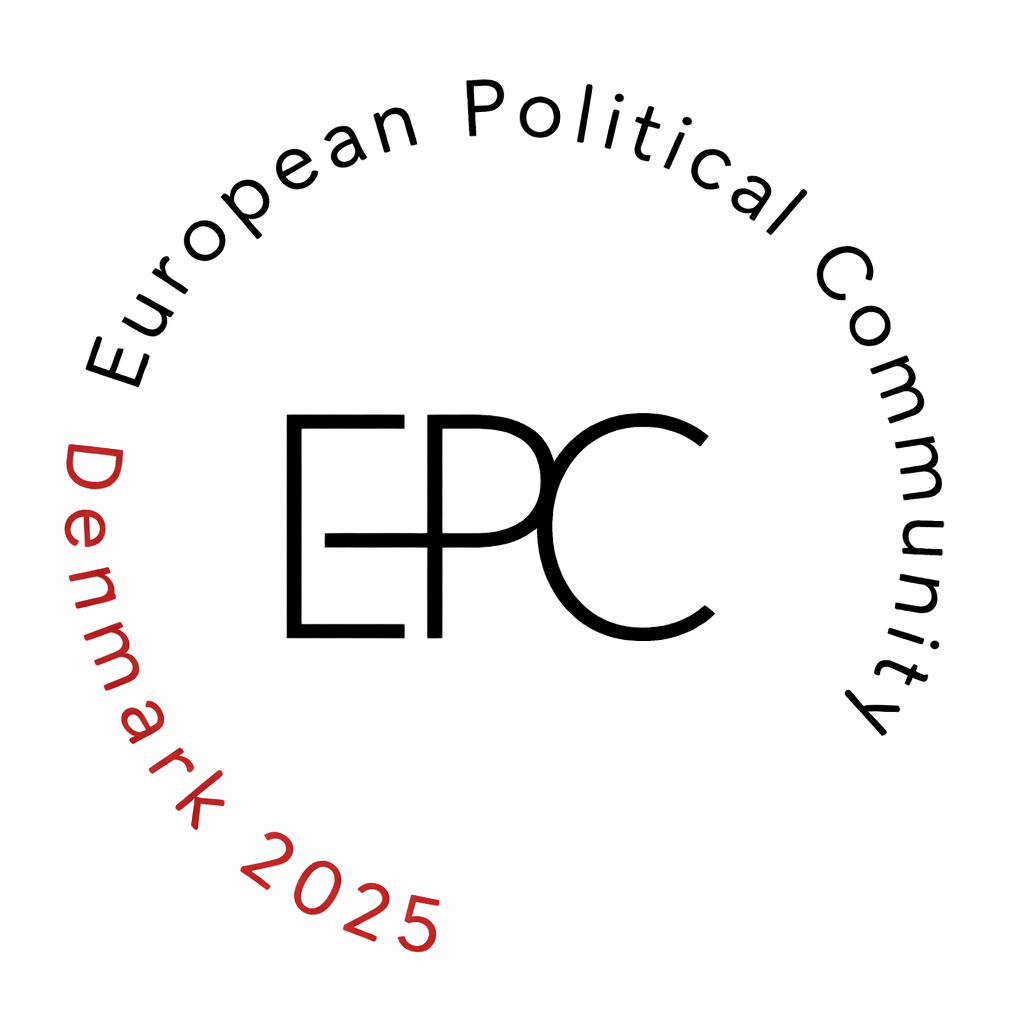
- Host country: Denmark
- Date: 2 October 2025
- Cities: Copenhagen
- Venues: Bella Center
- Participants: 43 countries
- Chair: Mette Frederiksen, Prime Minister of Denmark
- Follows: 6th
- Precedes: 8th
- Website: 7th European Political Community Summit

The Seventh European Political Community Summit was a meeting of the European Political Community held on 2 October 2025 in Copenhagen, Denmark.

== Background ==
Denmark was announced as the host of the seventh summit of the European Political Community by British Prime Minister Keir Starmer during the closing press conference of the fourth summit held in the United Kingdom in July 2024.

== Aims ==
The summit will focus on how to strengthen Ukraine, the general security situation in Europe and how to make our Europe stronger and more secure in the geopolitical situation we face. The plenary will be followed by several roundtable discussions focusing on different aspects of the security situation in Europe including; traditional & hybrid threats, economic security, migration.

== Schedule and agenda ==
The summit was held on Thursday 2 October 2025.

The schedule and agenda was as follows:

- 08.15 – 10.00: Arrivals, doorsteps and handshakes
- 10.00 – 11.30: Opening plenary session
- 11.30 – 12.00: Family photo
- 12.00 – 13.00: Roundtables
- 13.15 – 15.15: Bilateral meetings
- 15.15 – 16.30: Closing session
- 16.30: Press conference and exit doorsteps

== Attendees ==
Countries participating in the European Political Community

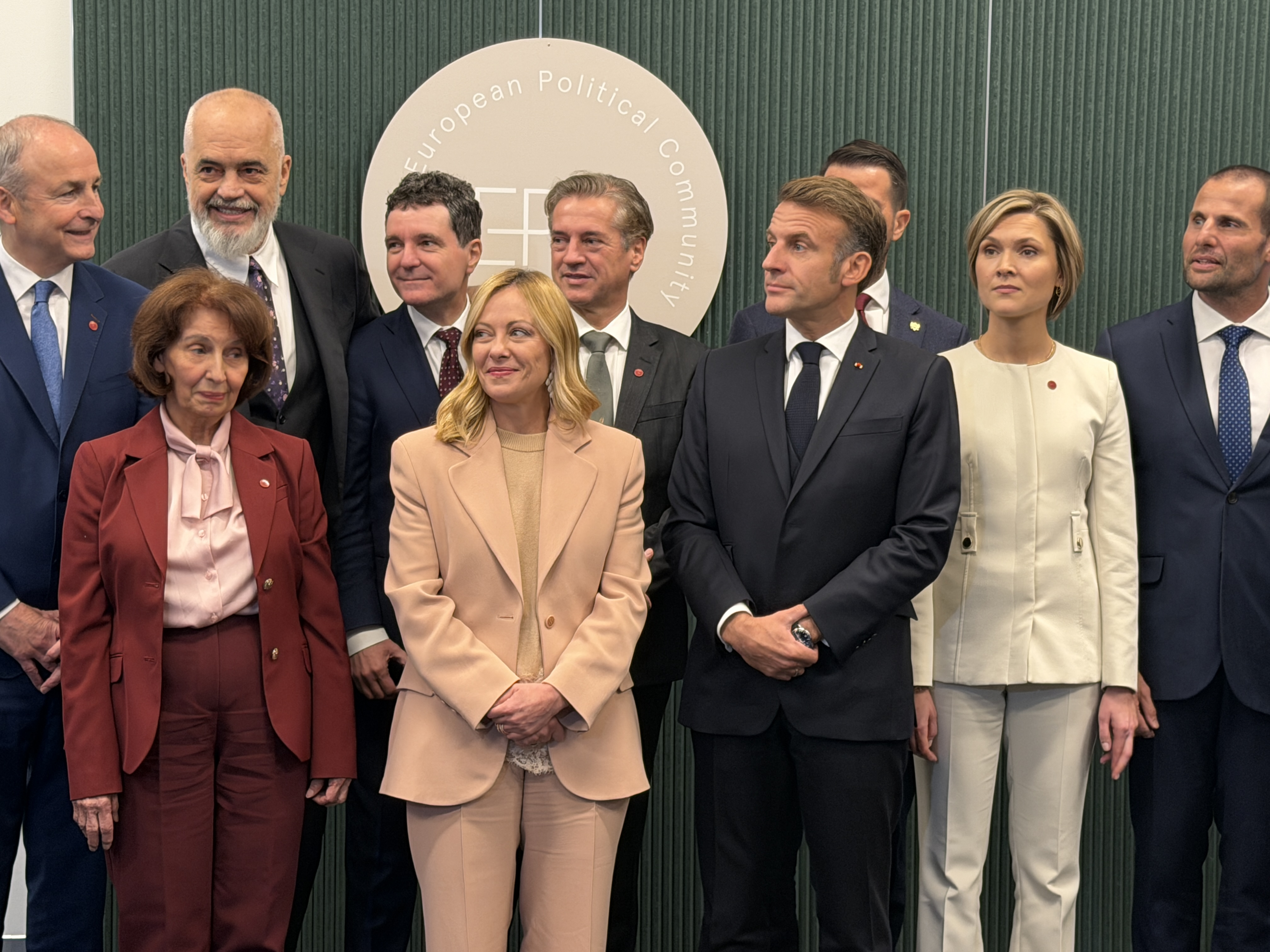
European leaders at the 7th European Political Community Summit

The summit was attended by the heads of state or government of the states participating in the European Political Community along with the president of the European Council, the president of the European Commission, the president of the European Parliament as well as the Secretaries General of the Council of Europe and the North Atlantic Treaty Organization (NATO). The prime ministers of Denmark's overseas territories, Greenland and the Faroe Islands, were represented for the first time within the ECP at this summit. British Prime Minister Keir Starmer left the summit early in order to chair a COBR meeting on a Manchester synagogue attack which occurred during the summit.

Participating states

Key
Absent

Member		Represented by	Title
(Albania)	Albania	Edi Rama	Prime Minister
(Andorra)	Andorra	Xavier Espot Zamora	Prime Minister
(Armenia)	Armenia	Nikol Pashinyan	Prime Minister
(Austria)	Austria	Christian Stocker	Chancellor
(Azerbaijan)	Azerbaijan	Ilham Aliyev	President
(Belgium)	Belgium	Bart De Wever	Prime Minister
(Bosnia and Herzegovina)	Bosnia and Herzegovina	Željko Komšić	Chairman of the Presidency
(Bulgaria)	Bulgaria	Rosen Zhelyazkov	Prime Minister
(Croatia)	Croatia	Andrej Plenković	Prime Minister
(Cyprus)	Cyprus	Nikos Christodoulides	President
(Czech Republic)	Czech Republic		
(Denmark)	Denmark	Mette Frederiksen	Prime Minister
(Estonia)	Estonia	Kristen Michal	Prime Minister
(European Union)	European Union		
(European Union)	European Union	Kaja Kallas	High Representative of the Union for Foreign Affairs and Security Policy
(European Union)	European Union	António Costa	President of the European Council
(European Union)	European Union	Ursula von der Leyen	President of the European Commission
(European Union)	European Union	Roberta Metsola	President of the European Parliament
(Finland)	Finland	Petteri Orpo	Prime Minister
(France)	France	Emmanuel Macron	President
(Georgia (country))	Georgia	Irakli Kobakhidze	Prime Minister
(Germany)	Germany	Friedrich Merz	Chancellor
(Greece)	Greece	Kyriakos Mitsotakis	Prime Minister
(Hungary)	Hungary	Viktor Orbán	Prime Minister
(Iceland)	Iceland	Kristrún Frostadóttir	Prime Minister
(Republic of Ireland)	Ireland	Micheál Martin	Taoiseach
(Italy)	Italy	Giorgia Meloni	Prime Minister
(Kosovo)	Kosovo	Vjosa Osmani	President
(Latvia)	Latvia	Evika Siliņa	Prime Minister
(Liechtenstein)	Liechtenstein	Brigitte Haas	Prime Minister
(Lithuania)	Lithuania	Gitanas Nausėda	President
(Luxembourg)	Luxembourg	Luc Frieden	Prime Minister
(Malta)	Malta	Robert Abela	Prime Minister
(Moldova)	Moldova	Maia Sandu	President
(Monaco)	Monaco	Albert II	Sovereign Prince
(Montenegro)	Montenegro	Jakov Milatović	President
(Netherlands)	Netherlands	Dick Schoof	Prime Minister
(North Macedonia)	North Macedonia	Gordana Siljanovska-Davkova	President
(Norway)	Norway	Jonas Gahr Støre	Prime Minister
(Poland)	Poland	Donald Tusk	Prime Minister
(Portugal)	Portugal	Luís Montenegro	Prime Minister
(Romania)	Romania	Nicușor-Daniel Dan	President
(San Marino)	San Marino		
(Serbia)	Serbia	Aleksandar Vučić	President
(Slovakia)	Slovakia		
(Slovenia)	Slovenia	Robert Golob	Prime Minister
(Spain)	Spain	Pedro Sánchez	Prime Minister
(Sweden)	Sweden	Ulf Kristersson	Prime Minister
(Switzerland)	Switzerland	Karin Keller-Sutter	President
(Turkey)	Turkey		
(Ukraine)	Ukraine	Volodymyr Zelenskyy	President
(United Kingdom)	United Kingdom	Keir Starmer	Prime Minister

Invited delegates

Entity		Represented by	Title
(Greenland)	Greenland	Jens-Frederik Nielsen	Prime Minister
(Faroe Islands)	Faroe Islands	Aksel V. Johannesen	Prime Minister
(NATO)	North Atlantic Treaty Organization	Mark Rutte	Secretary General
	Council of Europe	Alain Berset	Secretary General
(Organization for Security and Co-operation in Europe)	Organization for Security and Co-operation in Europe	Feridun Hadi Sinirlioğlu	Secretary-General
	United Transitional Cabinet of Belarus	Sviatlana Tsikhanouskaya	Head

== Outcomes ==
=== European Coalition Against Drugs (ECAD) ===
The governments of France, Italy, Albania, Andorra, Armenia, Bosnia Herzegovina, Bulgaria, Cyprus, Croatia, Denmark, Georgia, Hungary, Iceland, Ireland, Kosovo, Latvia, Lithuania, Luxembourg, Malta, Moldova, Monaco, Montenegro, Netherlands, North Macedonia, Norway, Poland, Portugal, Romania, San Marino, Serbia, Slovakia, Slovenia, Sweden, and the United Kingdom, together with the Council of Europe agreed to launch a European Coalition Against Drugs (ECAD) as a platform within the European Political Community.

=== Greenland-United Kingdom relations ===
During the summit, Greenland and the United Kingdom agreed to resume negotiations on the Greenland–United Kingdom Partnership, Trade and Cooperation Agreement, a post-Brexit free trade agreement which had previously stagnated.

== See also ==
- European integration
- Pan-European identity
- Politics of Europe
