= 8th European Political Community Summit =

European Political Community Summit

8th European Political Community Summit Եվրոպական քաղաքական համայնքի ութերորդ գագաթնաժողով
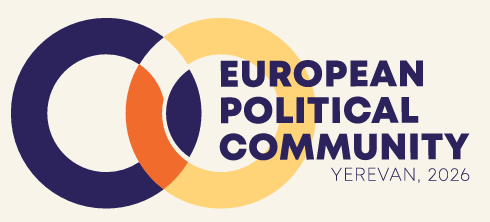
- Host country: Armenia
- Date: 4 May 2026
- Motto: Building the Future: Unity and Stability in Europe
- Cities: Yerevan
- Venues: Karen Demirchyan Complex
- Participants: 48 countries
- Chair: Nikol Pashinyan, Prime Minister of Armenia
- Follows: 7th
- Precedes: 9th
- Website: epcyerevan2026.am

The 8th Summit of the European Political Community was held on 4 May 2026 in Yerevan, Armenia, the first EPC summit hosted in the South Caucasus. The European Political Community (EPC) is an intergovernmental forum, created in 2022 after the Russian invasion of Ukraine, that meets twice a year and includes all European states except Belarus, Russia and the Vatican. More than 40 leaders attended, and Canada took part for the first time as the first non-European guest. Discussions centred on Ukraine, energy security and relations with Russia, and the summit was followed by the first EU-Armenia Summit. Moscow responded with criticism of Armenia's hosting of the event.

== Background ==
Armenia was announced as the host of the 8th summit of the European Political Community on 23 May 2025, following the 7th European Political Community Summit held on 2 October 2025 in Copenhagen, Denmark. The Prime Minister of the Republic of Armenia, Nikol Pashinyan announced that the summit would be held on Monday, 4 May 2026, in Yerevan.

The 8th EPC summit was expected to be the largest international political event hosted by Armenia since its independence, with 48 heads of state and government from member states and partner countries expected to attend, together with invited delegates. Alongside the 8th EPC summit, three other high‑level events were planned on 4 and 5 May 2026, including the inaugural EU-Armenia Summit, the state visit of the President of France, Emmanuel Macron, and the Yerevan Dialogue international forum.

At the first ever EU-Armenia summit, the President of the European Council, António Costa, together with the President of the European Commission, Ursula von der Leyen, will represent the EU, and the Prime Minister Nikol Pashinyan will represent Armenia.

The event comes at an important moment for Armenia, given the Joint Declaration reached between Armenia and Azerbaijan on 8 August 2025 in the presence of the President of the United States, Donald Trump, which has been further welcomed by the EU, their joint support for Armenia's Crossroads of Peace initiative and the "Trump Route for International Peace and Prosperity" (TRIPP) connectivity project in the territory of Armenia, as well as the alignment with two EPC strategic topics, including connectivity and addressing evolving security dynamics and regional challenges.

A state visit by the President of France, Emmanuel Macron, will take place shortly after the solemn opening ceremony of the new building of the Embassy of Armenia in France, held in Paris on 28 April 2026 with the participation of Armenia's Minister of Foreign Affairs, Ararat Mirzoyan, and France's Minister for Europe and Foreign Affairs, Jean-Noël Barrot. As part of the state visit, Macron, accompanied by the Prime Minister of Armenia, will formalize a strategic partnership, visit Tsitsernakaberd and the Matenadaran, meet with the President of Armenia, Vahagn Khachaturyan, travel to Gyumri to honour the memory of the victims of the 1988 earthquake, and conclude the visit with the concert titled "Musical Bridge: Armenia-France" in Gyumri.

EU relations with Armenia are based on the EU-Armenia Comprehensive and Enhanced Partnership Agreement (CEPA), effective since 2021, and the Strategic Agenda for the EU-Armenia Partnership, which were adopted in 2025.

== Aims ==
The 8th EPC summit is to focus on four strategic topics:

- Strengthening democratic resilience
- Advancing connectivity
- Reinforcing economic and energy security
- Addressing evolving security dynamics and regional challenges

== Schedule and agenda ==
The summit was scheduled to take place on Monday 04 May 2026 at the Karen Demirchyan Complex in Yerevan, Armenia. An official statement issued by the Police of Armenia on 01 May 2026, operating under the Ministry of Internal Affairs of Armenia, announced that security and traffic‑control measures would be in place from 4 to 5 May 2026 for the 8th EPC summit, the 1st EU-Armenia summit, the state visit of the President of France, Emmanuel Macron, and the Yerevan Dialogue international forum, considered unprecedented since Armenia's independence owing to the scale of the anticipated high‑level attendance.

== Attendees ==
=== Participating member states, partner countries and invited delegates ===
Countries participating in the European Political Community

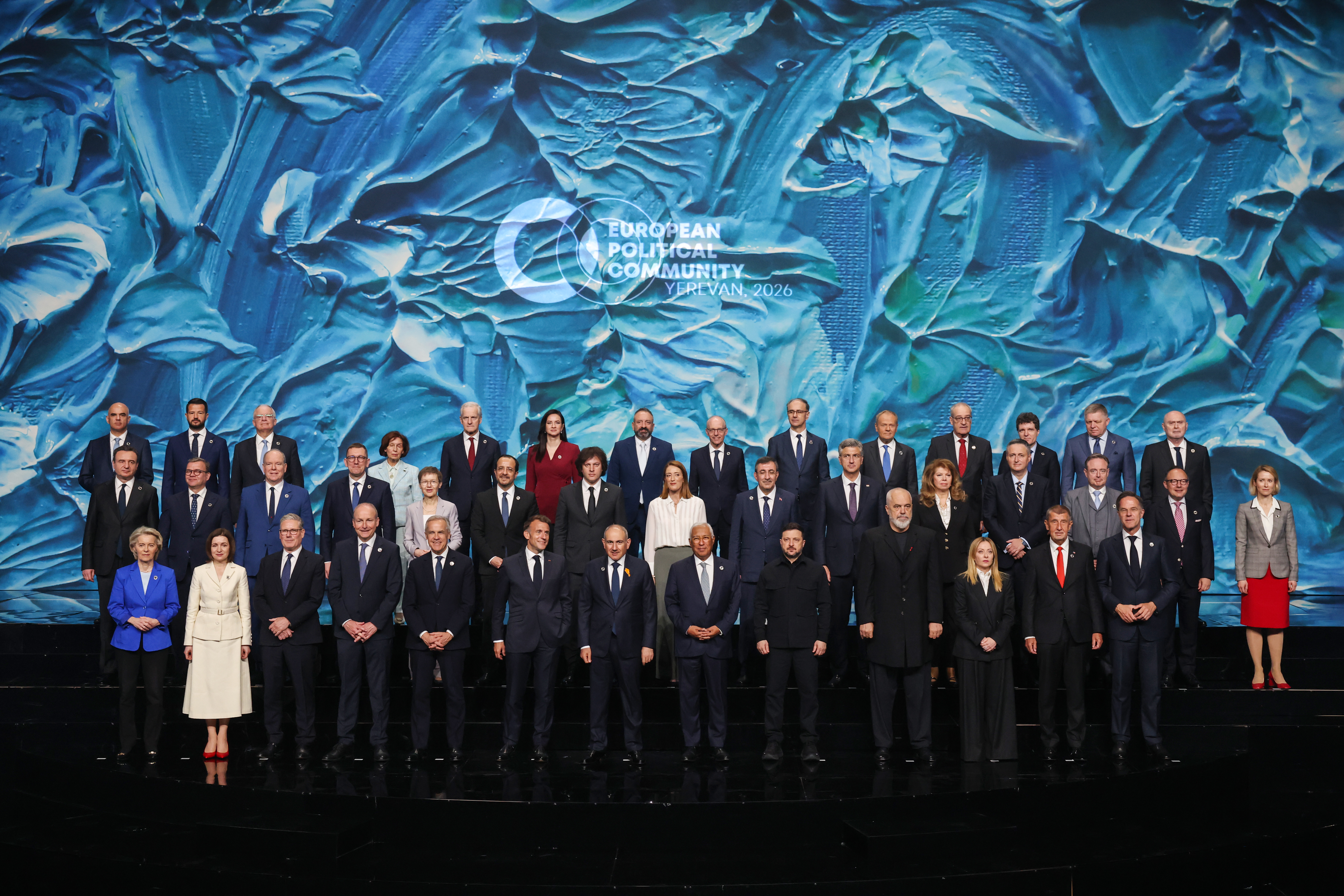
Family photo of the 8th European Political Community Summit

The summit was attended by the heads of state and government of the member states and partner countries participating in the European Political Community, together with the President of the European Council, the President of the European Commission, the President of the European Parliament and the High Representative of the Union for Foreign Affairs and Security Policy. Mark Carney, the Prime Minister of Canada, was the first representative to attend from a non-European country. Among the invited delegates, the Secretary General of NATO, Mark Rutte, and the Secretary General of the Council of Europe, Alain Berset, will travel to Yerevan to attend the 8th EPC summit and are expected to hold multiple bilateral meetings with leaders present at the EPC, including with the Prime Minister of the Republic of Armenia, Nikol Pashinyan Azerbaijani president Ilham Aliyev did not attend the summit in person but gave remarks via video link.

Participating member states and partner countries

Legend
IP	Invited and present
H	Host
IB	Invited but absent

Member states and partner countries		Represented by / Invited	Title	Attendance
(Albania)	Albania	Edi Rama	Prime Minister	IP
(Andorra)	Andorra	Xavier Espot Zamora	Prime Minister	IP
(Armenia)	Armenia	Nikol Pashinyan	Prime Minister	H
(Austria)	Austria	Christian Stocker	Chancellor	IB
(Azerbaijan)	Azerbaijan	Ilham Aliyev	President	IB
(Belgium)	Belgium	Bart De Wever	Prime Minister	IP
(Bosnia and Herzegovina)	Bosnia and Herzegovina	Denis Bećirović	Chairman of the Presidency	IP
(Bulgaria)	Bulgaria	Iliana Iotova	President	IP
(Croatia)	Croatia	Andrej Plenković	Prime Minister	IP
(Cyprus)	Cyprus	Nikos Christodoulides	President	IP
(Czech Republic)	Czech Republic	Andrej Babiš	Prime Minister	IP
(Denmark)	Denmark	Mette Frederiksen	Prime Minister	IB
(Estonia)	Estonia	Kristen Michal	Prime Minister	IP
(European Union)	European Union			
(European Union)	European Union	António Costa	President of the European Council	IP
(European Union)	European Union	Ursula von der Leyen	President of the European Commission	IP
(European Union)	European Union	Roberta Metsola	President of the European Parliament	IP
(European Union)	European Union	Kaja Kallas	High Representative of the Union for Foreign Affairs and Security Policy	IP
(Finland)	Finland	Petteri Orpo	Prime Minister	IP
(France)	France	Emmanuel Macron	President	IP
(Georgia (country))	Georgia	Irakli Kobakhidze	Prime Minister	IP
(Germany)	Germany	Friedrich Merz	Chancellor	IB
(Greece)	Greece	Konstantinos Tasoulas	President	IP
(Hungary)	Hungary	Viktor Orbán	Prime Minister	IB
(Iceland)	Iceland	Kristrún Frostadóttir	Prime Minister	IB
(Republic of Ireland)	Ireland	Micheál Martin	Taoiseach	IP
(Italy)	Italy	Giorgia Meloni	Prime Minister	IP
(Kosovo)	Kosovo	Albin Kurti	Prime Minister	IP
(Latvia)	Latvia	Evika Siliņa	Prime Minister	IB
(Liechtenstein)	Liechtenstein	Brigitte Haas	Prime Minister	IP
(Lithuania)	Lithuania	Inga Ruginienė	Prime Minister	IP
(Luxembourg)	Luxembourg	Luc Frieden	Prime Minister	IP
(Malta)	Malta	Robert Abela	Prime Minister	IB
(Moldova)	Moldova	Maia Sandu	President	IP
(Monaco)	Monaco	Albert II	Sovereign Prince	IP
(Montenegro)	Montenegro	Jakov Milatović	President	IP
(Netherlands)	Netherlands	Rob Jetten	Prime Minister	IB
(North Macedonia)	North Macedonia	Gordana Siljanovska-Davkova	President	IP
(Norway)	Norway	Jonas Gahr Støre	Prime Minister	IP
(Poland)	Poland	Donald Tusk	Prime Minister	IP
(Portugal)	Portugal	Luís Montenegro	Prime Minister	IB
(Romania)	Romania	Nicușor Dan	President	IP
(San Marino)	San Marino	Luca Beccari	Secretary of State for Foreign and Political Affairs	IP
(Serbia)	Serbia	Đuro Macut	Prime Minister	IP
(Slovakia)	Slovakia	Robert Fico	Prime Minister	IP
(Slovenia)	Slovenia	Robert Golob	Prime Minister	IB
(Spain)	Spain	Pedro Sánchez	Prime Minister	IP
(Sweden)	Sweden	Ulf Kristersson	Prime Minister	IB
(Switzerland)	Switzerland	Guy Parmelin	President	IP
(Turkey)	Turkey	Cevdet Yılmaz	Vice President	IP
(Ukraine)	Ukraine	Volodymyr Zelenskyy	President	IP
(United Kingdom)	United Kingdom	Keir Starmer	Prime Minister	IP

=== Invited delegates ===
Invited countries and entities		Represented by	Title	Attendance
(Canada)	Canada	Mark Carney	Prime Minister	IP
	Council of Europe	Alain Berset	Secretary General	IP
(Organization for Security and Co-operation in Europe)	Organization for Security and Co-operation in Europe	Feridun Hadi Sinirlioğlu	Secretary-General	IP
(NATO)	North Atlantic Treaty Organization	Mark Rutte	Secretary General	IP
	United Transitional Cabinet of Belarus	Sviatlana Tsikhanouskaya	Leader of democratic forces of Belarus	IP

== Proceedings and bilateral meetings ==
The EPC is an informal format that does not produce binding decisions, and the summit's practical results were largely bilateral. Keir Starmer became the first sitting British prime minister to visit Armenia and signed a joint declaration on a strategic partnership with Nikol Pashinyan; Pashinyan and Croatia's Andrej Plenković signed a strategic dialogue document, and Emmanuel Macron, who combined the summit with a state visit, announced that France and Armenia would form a strategic partnership.

Ukraine was a major theme. Macron and Starmer co-hosted a meeting of leaders with Volodymyr Zelenskyy on the sidelines to review work on support for Ukraine, and Zelenskyy held bilateral talks with Starmer, Petteri Orpo, Jonas Gahr Støre and Andrej Babiš. Ursula von der Leyen and Starmer discussed the United Kingdom's participation in the EU's €90 billion loan for Ukraine. Chancellor Friedrich Merz did not attend and was represented by Macron. Azerbaijani president Ilham Aliyev did not travel to Yerevan and addressed the meeting by video link.

== Reception and analysis ==
Open press conferences were not held at the summit, a restriction RFE/RL reported had been imposed by the host. An Armenian opposition movement held a march in Yerevan during the summit. A UK parliamentary committee document noted that Armenia's position between Russia and Iran brought the war in Ukraine and the situation in the Middle East into focus at the summit. A Gnomon Wise analysis examined the summit's implications for Armenia's rapprochement with Europe and its distancing from Russia.

Russia said Armenia would face "political and economic" consequences for aligning with the EU, and Russian political analyst Andrey Bystritsky described the summit as a demarche against Moscow that was not meant to be a decision-making platform.

== Aftermath ==
The next EPC summits are scheduled for Ireland in November 2026 and Switzerland in April 2027.

== See also ==
- Armenia–European Union relations
- Accession of Armenia to the European Union
- EU-Armenia Comprehensive and Enhanced Partnership Agreement
- Delegation of the European Union to Armenia
- European Union Mission in Armenia
