= 9th European Political Community Summit =

European Political Community Summit

9th European Political Community Summit An naoú cruinniú mullaigh den Chomhphobal Polaitiúil Eorpach
- Host country: Republic of Ireland
- Date: 12 November 2026
- Motto: Europe: strong, secure and connected
- City: Dublin
- Venue: Convention Centre Dublin
- Participants: 49 attendees
- Chair: Micheál Martin, Taoiseach of Ireland
- Follows: 8th
- Precedes: 10th
- Website: https://www.ireland.ie/en/epc/

The Ninth European Political Community Summit was a meeting of the European Political Community held on 12 November 2026 in the Republic of Ireland.

== Background ==
Ireland will host the Ninth Summit of the European Political Community in November 2026 during its presidency of the Council of the European Union. The summit will take place at Convention Centre Dublin.

== Aims ==
The theme of the summit was "Europe: strong, secure and connected"

The topics to be discussed included:

- building a competitive Europe (innovation, connectivity and affordable energy)
- securing and defending a democratic Europe

== Schedule and agenda ==
The summit was held on Thursday 12 November 2026.

The schedule and agenda was as follows:

- 10.00 – 11.30: Arrivals, handshakes and doorsteps
- 11.30 – 12.45: Opening Plenary
- 12.45 – 13.00: Family photo
- 13.00 – 14.00: Roundtable discussions
- 15.00 – 17.15: Bilateral meetings and informal engagements
- 17.15 – 17.45: Closing plenary
- 17.45 – 18:30: Press conference
- 18:30 – 20:30: Official dinner and reception

== Participants ==
=== Participating states and organisations ===
Countries participating in the European Political Community

Dublin, November 2026

The heads of state or government of the states participating in the European Political Community along with the representatives from the European Union and other intergovernmental organisations were invited to attend the summit.

Belgian prime minister Bart De Wever was unable to attend due to ongoing budget talks. Dutch prime minister Rob Jetten was also unable to attend due to crisis talks about a tax bill.

Participating states

Key
Absent

Member		Represented by	Title
(Albania)	Albania	Edi Rama	Prime Minister
(Andorra)	Andorra	Xavier Espot Zamora	Prime Minister
(Armenia)	Armenia	Nikol Pashinyan	Prime Minister
(Austria)	Austria		
(Azerbaijan)	Azerbaijan	Ilham Aliyev	President
(Belgium)	Belgium		
(Bosnia and Herzegovina)	Bosnia and Herzegovina	Denis Bećirović	Chairman of the Presidency
(Bulgaria)	Bulgaria	Rumen Radev	Prime Minister
(Croatia)	Croatia	Andrej Plenković	Prime Minister
(Cyprus)	Cyprus	Nikos Christodoulides	President
(Czech Republic)	Czech Republic	Andrej Babiš	Prime Minister
(Denmark)	Denmark	Mette Frederiksen	Prime Minister
(Estonia)	Estonia	Kristen Michal	Prime Minister
(Finland)	Finland	Petteri Orpo	Prime Minister
(France)	France	Emmanuel Macron	President
(Georgia (country))	Georgia	Irakli Kobakhidze	Prime Minister
(Germany)	Germany	Friedrich Merz	Chancellor
(Greece)	Greece	Kyriakos Mitsotakis	Prime Minister
(Hungary)	Hungary	Péter Magyar	Prime Minister
(Iceland)	Iceland	Kristrún Frostadóttir	Prime Minister
(Republic of Ireland)	Ireland (Host)	Micheál Martin (Chair)	Taoiseach
(Italy)	Italy	Giorgia Meloni	Prime Minister
(Kosovo)	Kosovo	Albin Kurti	Prime Minister
(Latvia)	Latvia	Andris Kulbergs	Prime Minister
(Liechtenstein)	Liechtenstein	Brigitte Haas	Prime Minister
(Lithuania)	Lithuania	Gitanas Nausėda	President
(Luxembourg)	Luxembourg	Luc Frieden	Prime Minister
(Malta)	Malta	Robert Abela	Prime Minister
(Moldova)	Moldova	Maia Sandu	President
(Monaco)	Monaco	Albert II of Monaco	Prince
(Montenegro)	Montenegro	Jakov Milatović	President
(Netherlands)	Netherlands		
(North Macedonia)	North Macedonia	Gordana Siljanovska-Davkova	President
(Norway)	Norway		
(Poland)	Poland	Donald Tusk	Prime Minister
(Portugal)	Portugal	Luís Montenegro	Prime Minister
(Romania)	Romania	Nicușor Dan	President
(San Marino)	San Marino	Luca Beccari	Secretary of State for Foreign and Political Affairs
(Serbia)	Serbia	Ana Brnabić	Acting President
(Slovakia)	Slovakia	Robert Fico	Prime Minister
(Slovenia)	Slovenia	Janez Janša	Prime Minister
(Spain)	Spain		
(Sweden)	Sweden	Ulf Kristersson	Prime Minister
(Switzerland)	Switzerland	Guy Parmelin	President
(Turkey)	Turkey		
(Ukraine)	Ukraine	Volodymyr Zelenskyy	President
(United Kingdom)	United Kingdom	Andy Burnham	Prime Minister

=== Organisations and guests ===
Invited countries and entities		Represented by	Title
(Canada)	Canada	Mark Carney	Prime Minister
	Council of Europe	Alain Berset	Secretary General
(European Union)	European Union		
(European Union)	European Union	António Costa	President of the European Council
(European Union)	European Union	Ursula von der Leyen	President of the European Commission
(European Union)	European Union	Kaja Kallas	High Representative of the Union for Foreign Affairs and Security Policy
(European Union)	European Union	Roberta Metsola	President of the European Parliament
(NATO)	North Atlantic Treaty Organization	Mark Rutte	Secretary General
(Organization for Security and Co-operation in Europe)	Organization for Security and Co-operation in Europe	Feridun Hadi Sinirlioğlu	Secretary-General
	United Transitional Cabinet of Belarus	Sviatlana Tsikhanouskaya	Leader of democratic forces of Belarus

== Security threats ==
On 13 November 2026, a day after the summit, Irish police launched an investigation after an explosive device was found in an office building on Merrion Square in central Dublin, near the National Gallery of Ireland, where European leaders had attended a dinner during the summit. The Irish Defence Forces' Explosive Ordnance Disposal team described the device as "crude but viable" after making it safe. The discovery took place during heightened security measures associated with the summit and a wave of bomb threats throughout Europe.
