= European Political Community =

International diplomatic meeting

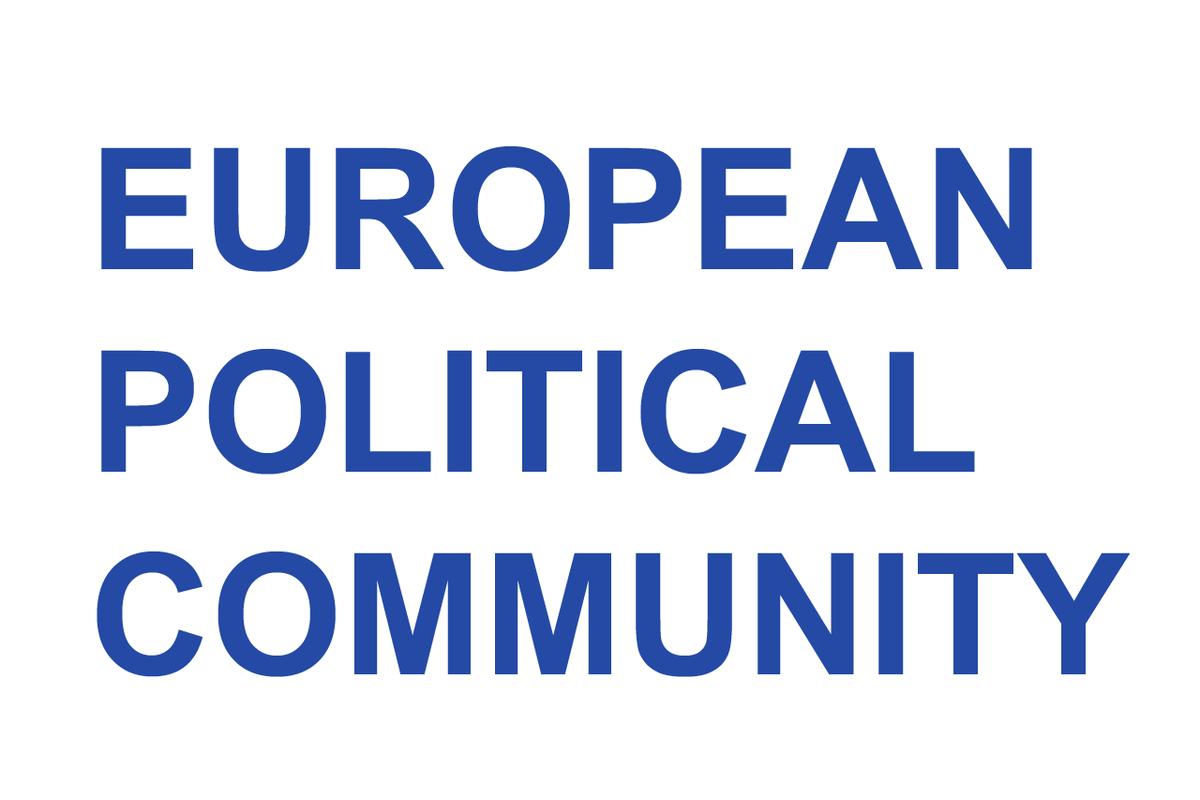
- Logo

- Participating states
- Type: Intergovernmental organisation
- Membership: 47 participating states

Leaders
  - Incoming Host: Switzerland
  - Outgoing Host: Republic of Ireland

Establishment
  - Initial proposal: 9 May 2022
  - Agreed at European Council: 24 June 2022
  - Inaugural Summit: 6 October 2022 in Prague

The European Political Community (EPC) is an intergovernmental forum for political and strategic discussions about the future of Europe, established in 2022 after the Russian invasion of Ukraine. The group first met in October 2022 in Prague, with participants from 44 European countries, as well as both the president of the European Council and of the European Commission. It is distinct from both the European Union (which is a participant) and the Council of Europe (represented by its Secretary General). The 47 EPC participating states are home to 689.5 million people, constitute 8.7 percent of the world's population and represent about 23.5 percent of the global GDP.

== History ==
The European Political Community was proposed by the French president Emmanuel Macron at the Conference on the Future of Europe on 9 May 2022 after the Russian invasion of Ukraine, in his role as the president of the Council of the European Union (EU). The President of the European Council, Charles Michel, also put forward a similar proposal for the establishment of a "European geopolitical community". On 23–24 June 2022, formation of the community was agreed to at a meeting of the European Council. On 29 September 2022, the United Kingdom announced that it would participate in the community. The group convened for the first time on 6 October 2022 with leaders from 44 states in attendance. Russia and Belarus were deliberately excluded from participation. In January 2023, it was confirmed that San Marino had joined the community becoming its 45th participating state. The heads of government of Andorra and Monaco were also invited to the second summit bringing the number of participants up to 47.

In April 2026, Canada was invited to participate in the summit in Yerevan, Armenia, represented by prime minister Mark Carney. This marked the first time a non-European country was invited to take part in the event.

== Aim ==
In his address to the European Parliament on 9 May 2022, French President Emmanuel Macron proposed the European Political Community as "a new European organization" that would allow countries "that subscribe to our shared core values to find a new space for cooperation" on politics, security, energy, infrastructure, investment, and migration.

The aim of the European Political Community is to provide a policy coordination platform for European countries across the continent and to foster political dialogue and cooperation to address issues of common interest, so as to strengthen the security, stability and prosperity of the European continent, in particular in regard to the European energy crisis.

The European Political Community aims at:

- strengthening the links between EU member states and non-EU member states who share the same European values,
- increasing cooperation between the member countries on a large scale of topics, such as peace, security, energy, climate, migration and the current economic situation,
- allowing candidate states to start taking part in some European projects, such as student and university exchanges.

Following a bilateral summit meeting between the leaders of the United Kingdom and France on 10 March 2023, it was stated in the joint declaration that the EPC should focus on energy, infrastructures, connectivity, cybersecurity, countering disinformation and migration.

== Structure ==
The European Political Community is envisaged as an intergovernmental forum for heads of states and governments similar to the G7 or G20 and upon establishment did not have its own secretariat, budget or staff. Each summit is primarily organised by the hosting country. Initially, the incoming host, outgoing host and future host constituted a hosting trio to coordinate organising summits and the setting agendas. This was expanded to a quartet following the fourth summit in July 2024.

In January 2023, the Government of France began recruiting a small task force, led by a project manager, to support the work of the EPC. The task force will help coordinate the preparation and organisation of EPC Summits, support the institutional development of the EPC, facilitate the insertion of the EPC in the space European diplomacy (EU, Council of Europe) and contribute to mobilising various other actors (such as development banks) in support of the work of the EPC. French president Emmanuel Macron has appointed diplomat Hugues Moret as special envoy for the EPC.

The invitation letter for the first summit was signed by European Council President Charles Michel. For the second summit, invitation letters were jointly signed by Charles Michel and Maia Sandu, the president of the hosting country.

As the community has not launched an official website, the agendas, press releases and multimedia resources for the summits are published on the website of the European Council.

=== Platforms ===
The following platforms are associated with the European Political Community:

- Moldova Support Group, established in 2023
- European Coalition Against Drugs, established in 2025

== Symbols ==
A wordmark consisting of the English language name of the community in blue capital letters has been used since the first summit in October 2022. The initials "EPC" in blue on a white background have also been used to represent community. Each summit also has its own unique logo and branding.

As a condition for the United Kingdom's participation, Liz Truss during her brief tenure as prime minister insisted that the European Political Community should not use symbols associated with the European Union such as the European Flag or the European Anthem.

== Summits ==
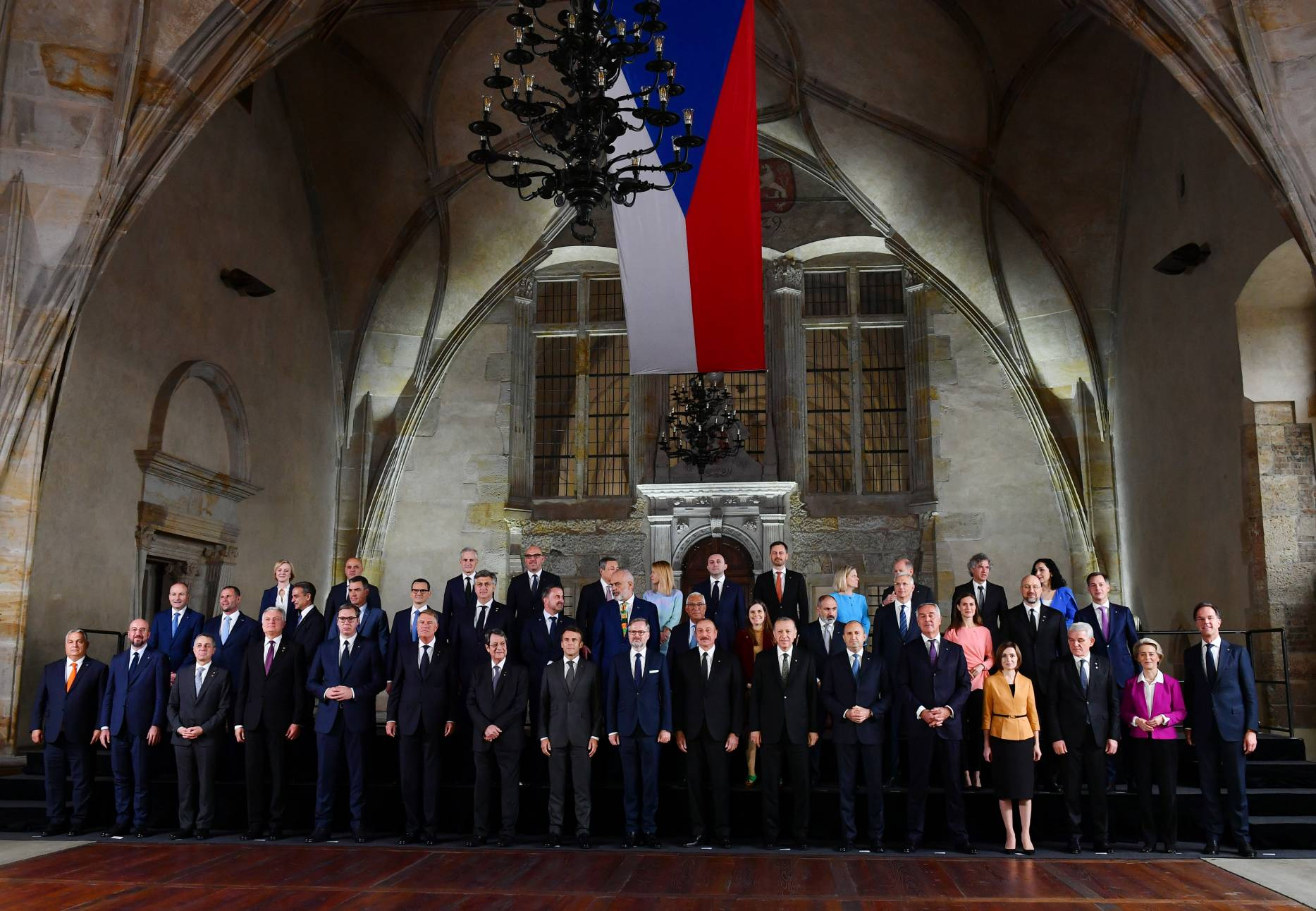
European leaders at the 1st EPC Summit in the Czech Republic

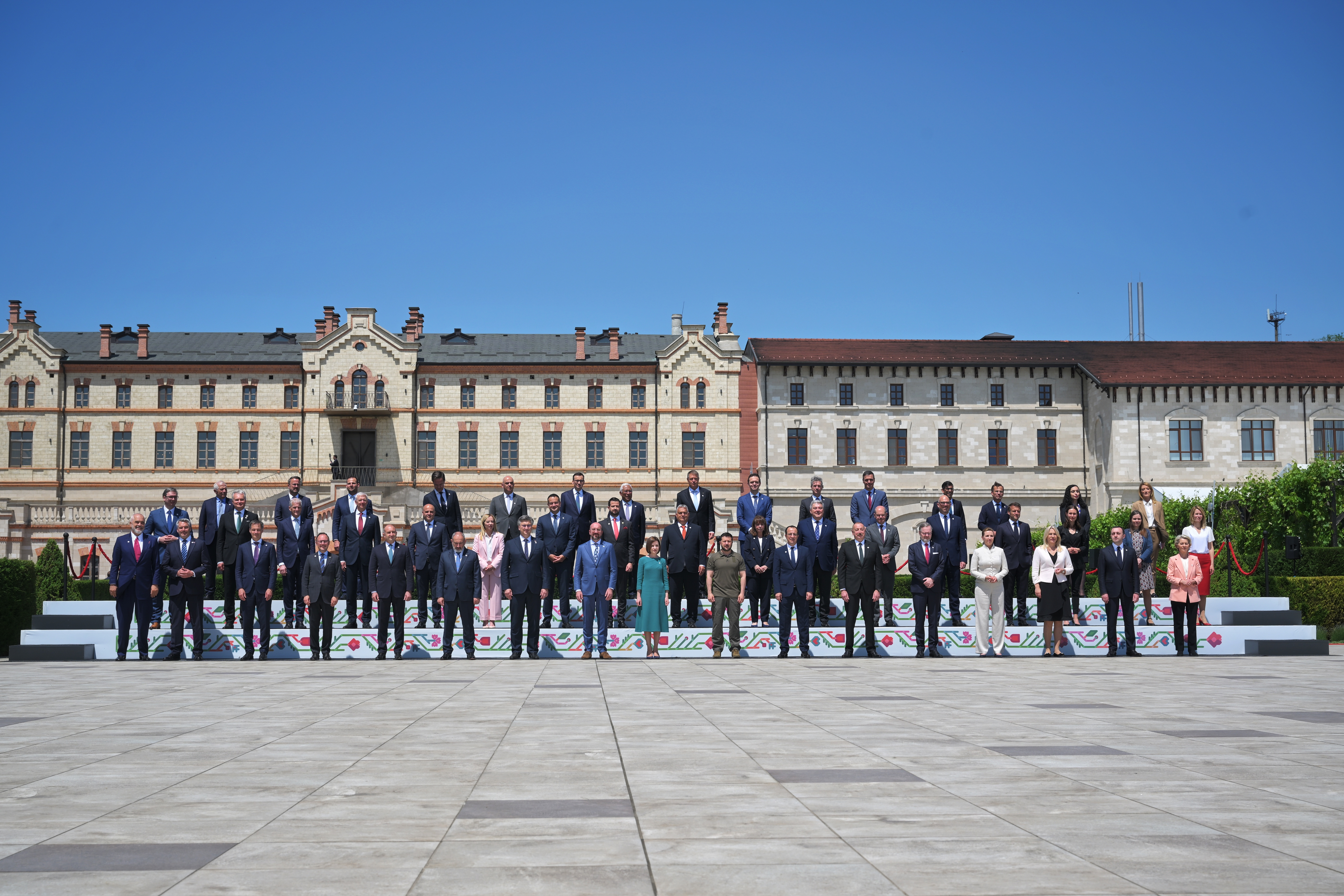
European leaders at the 2nd EPC Summit in Moldova

Two summits are held every year with the spring summit being hosted by a non-EU member state and the autumn summit hosted by an EU member state. The autumn summit is held in the country assuming the presidency of the Council of the European Union during that semester.

The first summit took place in Prague on 6 October 2022. The event was covered live by the Eurovision network.

Following the first summit, it was decided that Moldova would hold the following meeting, and topics on which leaders agreed to work on include protecting "key facilities", such as pipelines, undersea cables, and satellites. It was also agreed that the next two summits would take place in Spain and in the United Kingdom.

In May 2023, Switzerland expressed an interest in hosting an EPC summit in spring 2025. Serbia has also expressed an interest in hosting a future summit. During the closing press conference of the 4th summit, the British prime minister, Keir Starmer, confirmed that the next summit would take place in Hungary followed by summits in Albania and Denmark in 2025. In May 2025, it was announced that the EPC spring summits would be hosted by Armenia in 2026, Switzerland in 2027, and Azerbaijan in 2028, and that the autumn summits would be hosted by Ireland in 2026, Greece in 2027 and Latvia in 2028.

Overview of European Political Community summits
Number	Date	Logo	Host country	Host city	Chair	Countries attending
1	6 October 2022		Czech Republic	Prague Castle, Prague	Petr Fiala	44
2	1 June 2023		Moldova	Mimi Castle, Bulboaca	Maia Sandu	45
3	5 October 2023		Spain	Alhambra, Granada	Pedro Sánchez	45
4	18 July 2024		United Kingdom	Blenheim Palace, Woodstock	Keir Starmer	43
5	7 November 2024		Hungary	Puskás Aréna, Budapest	Viktor Orbán	42
6	16 May 2025		Albania	Skanderbeg Square, Tirana	Edi Rama	45
7	2 October 2025		Denmark	Bella Center, Copenhagen	Mette Frederiksen	43
8	4 May 2026		Armenia	Karen Demirchyan Complex, Yerevan	Nikol Pashinyan	36
9	12 November 2026		Ireland	Convention Centre Dublin, Dublin	Micheál Martin	41
10	April 2027		Switzerland	The Circle, Zurich		TBA
11	Autumn 2027		Greece	TBA		TBA
12	Spring 2028		Azerbaijan	TBA		TBA
13	Autumn 2028		Latvia	TBA		TBA

== Participants ==
A clickable Euler diagram showing the relationships between various European regional organisations

The countries and international organisations participating in the European Political Community are as follows:

Countries participating

- Albania
- Andorra
- Armenia
- Austria
- Azerbaijan
- Belgium
- Bosnia and Herzegovina
- Bulgaria
- Croatia
- Cyprus (Note: Country is not recognised by every participant.)
- Czech Republic
- Denmark
- Estonia
- Finland
- France
- Georgia
- Germany
- Greece
- Hungary
- Iceland
- Ireland
- Italy
- Kosovo
- Latvia
- Liechtenstein
- Lithuania
- Luxembourg
- Malta
- Moldova
- Monaco
- Montenegro
- Netherlands
- North Macedonia
- Norway
- Poland
- Portugal
- Romania
- San Marino
- Serbia
- Slovakia
- Slovenia
- Spain
- Sweden
- Switzerland
- Turkey
- Ukraine
- United Kingdom

Organisations participating

- Council of Europe (Since Summer 2024)
- European Union
  ∟ European Council
  ∟ European Commission
  ∟ European Parliament
- NATO (Since Summer 2024)
- OSCE (Since Summer 2024)

Guests

- United Transitional Cabinet of Belarus (Since Autumn 2023)
- Faroe Islands (Autumn 2025)
- Greenland (Autumn 2025)
- Canada (Spring 2026, Autumn 2026)

== Achievements ==
During the first summit, it was agreed that a European Union-led mission would be deployed on the Armenian side of the border with Azerbaijan for a period of two months of monitoring following the Armenia–Azerbaijan border crisis. This mission ultimately led to the deployment of a longer term European Union Mission in Armenia.

The first summit also led to a rapprochement between the United Kingdom and European institutions. At the summit, the UK agreed to re-engage with the North Seas Energy Cooperation (NSEC) and committed to joining the Permanent Structured Cooperation (PESCO) and its Military Mobility programme.

The second summit hosted by Moldova coincided with an €87m contribution to non-military logistical aid from the European Peace Facility, as well as the establishment of a civilian mission in Chișinău.

At the seventh summit hosted by Denmark in October 2025, European leaders agreed to launch a European Coalition Against Drugs (ECAD) as a platform within the European Political Community.

== Reception ==
=== Positive ===
German Chancellor, Olaf Scholz said that community could mediate "regular exchanges at the political level" once or twice a year to discuss issues affecting the continent. Prime Minister of Albania, Edi Rama, and Prime Minister of the Netherlands, Mark Rutte, supported Macron's proposal in an opinion piece published by Politico on 5 October 2022. They argued that Europe needed a platform that did not overlap with existing regional organisations or displace processes of European Union membership. In a command paper presented to parliament in March 2023, the UK government stated that it supports the aims of the EPC and sees it as a "notable and welcome new forum for continent-wide cooperation". The Consultative Committee of the European Economic Area welcomed the formation of the EPC and considers it to be a good arena for the discussion of talks and discussions related to maintaining peace and stability across the continent.

=== Negative ===
According to the Associated Press, critics claimed the EPC was an attempt to put the brakes on the potential enlargement of the European Union, speculating that "it may become a talking shop, perhaps convening once or twice a year but devoid of any real clout or content". Additionally, the first summit did not include a formal declaration, nor was any offer of EU money or programs proposed at the time. A spokesperson for the Council of Europe, in response to the summit, stated, "In the field of human rights, democracy and the rule of law, such a pan-European community already exists: it is the Council of Europe." However, in July 2024, the Secretary General of the Council of Europe, Marija Pejčinović Burić, did attend the 4th European Political Community Summit in the United Kingdom. Russia criticised the EPC as "yet another attempt by Brussels to build an anti-Russian coalition and prevail upon other countries to join the campaign of sanctions against Russia."

== See also ==
- Coalition of the willing (Russo-Ukrainian war)
- Council of Europe
- European integration
- Eurosphere
- Organization for Security and Co-operation in Europe
- Pan-European identity
- Politics of Europe
- Pro-Europeanism
