= List of international presidential trips made by Gitanas Nausėda =

This is a List of international presidential trips made by Gitanas Nausėda, the 9th president of Lithuania.

== Summary ==
Countries visited by Nausėda as of 20 May 2023.

- One: Armenia, Australia, Azerbaijan, Bulgaria, Croatia, Cyprus, Georgia, Hungary, Ireland, Montenegro, Slovakia, Turkey, United Arab Emirates and Vietnam
- Two: Albania, Czech Republic, Iceland, Japan, Portugal, and Sweden
- Three: Denmark, Moldova, Netherlands, Norway, Romania, Slovenia and Spain
- Four: Italy and Switzerland
- Five: Estonia, and Vatican City
- Six: Finland, France, Latvia and the United Kingdom
- Eight: United States
- Twelve: Ukraine
- Thirteen: Germany
- Seventeen: Poland
- Forty: Belgium

== 2019 ==
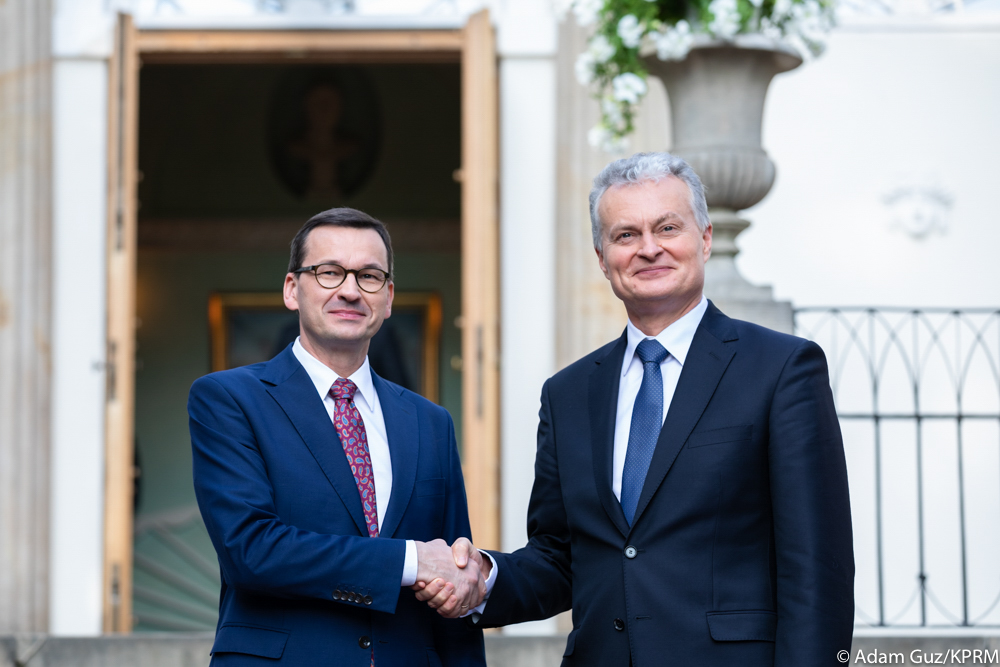
President Nausėda during meeting with Polish Prime Minister Morawiecki

Country	City	Date	Reason
Poland	Warsaw	16 July	Talks with President Andrzej Duda and Prime Minister Mateusz Morawiecki
Latvia	Riga	23 July	Talks with President Egils Levits
Germany	Berlin	14–15 August	Talks with German Chancellor Angela Merkel
Germany	Berlin	15 August	Talks with Federal President Frank-Walter Steinmeier
Estonia	Tallinn	20 August	Talks with President Kersti Kaljulaid
Poland	Warsaw	1 September	80th anniversary of the September campaign
Belgium	Brussels	4–5 September	European Conference
United States	New York City	22–26 September	United Nations General Assembly
Belgium	Brussels	17–18 October	European Conference
Japan	Tokyo	21–24 October	Enthronement of Japanese Emperor Naruhito
Finland	Helsinki	5 November	Talks with President Sauli Niinistö
Vatican	Vatican City	7 November	Talks with Pope Francis
Italy	Rome	7–8 November	Talks with Italian leaders
United Kingdom	London	3–4 December	See 2019 London summit
Belgium	Brussels	12–13 December	Took part in the meeting of the European Council.
Latvia	Riga	17 December	Met with the President of Latvia Egils Levits and the President of Estonia Kersti Kaljulaid.

== 2020 ==
Country	City	Date	Reason
Switzerland	Davos	20 January	See World Economic Forum
Poland	Oświęcim	27 January	75th Anniversary of the Liberation of Auschwitz
Belgium	Brussels	11 February	Talks with president of the European Council Charles Michel
Germany	Munich	14 February	Munich Security Conference 2020
Belgium	Brussels	20–21 February	Participated in the European Council session.
Poland	Grunwald	15 July	610th Anniversary of the Battle of Grunwald and talks with President Andrzej Duda
Belgium	Brussels	17–21 July	European Conference
Belgium	Brussels	1–2 September	Meeting of the European Council
Belgium	Brussels	15–16 September	Meeting of the European Council
Belgium	Brussels	10–11 December	Meeting of the European Council

== 2021 ==
Country	City	Date	Reason
Ukraine	Kyiv	17–19 March	Talks with President Volodymyr Zelenskyy during Prelude to the Russian invasion of Ukraine
Poland	Warsaw	2–3 May	230th Anniversary of the Constitution of 3 May
Portugal	Lisbon, Porto	6–8 May	European Leaders' Meeting
Moldova	Chișinău	13–14 May	Talks with President Maia Sandu
Belgium	Brussels	24–25 May	Meeting of the European Council
Georgia	Tbilisi	10–11 June	Talks with President Salome Zourabichvili
Belgium	Brussels	13–14 June	Attended NATO summit. Talks with Turkish President Recep Tayyip Erdoğan. NATO Conference and talks with United States President Joe Biden
Sweden	Stockholm	15–16 June	Talks with King Carl XVI Gustaf, Speaker Andreas Norlén and Prime Minister Stefan Löfven
Belgium	Brussels	24–25 June	Participated in the European Council session.
Bulgaria	Sofia	8–9 July	Participated in the sixth Three Seas Initiative leaders' meeting, met separately with Greek President Katerina Sakellaropoulou.
Poland	Kraków	11 July	Met with President Andrzej Duda.
Ukraine	Kyiv	22–24 August	Attended Crimea Platform and Kyiv Independence Day Parade
Germany	Berlin	15–16 September	Talks with Chancellor Angela Merkel
United States	New York City	20–22 September	Meeting of the United Nations
United States	Chicago	22–24 September	Reception with the American-Lithuanian community of Chicago
Slovenia	Ljubljana	5–6 October	Talks with President Borut Pahor
Sweden	Malmö	13 October	Participated in the Malmö International Forum on Holocaust Remembrance and Combating Antisemitism.
Belgium	Brussels	21–22 October	Talks with Prime Minister Alexander De Croo
United Kingdom	Glasgow	1–2 November	Tour of Scotland and reception with Scottish leaders. Attended 2021 United Nations Climate Change Conference. At the conference of member states, he held bilateral meetings with Icelandic Prime Minister Katrín Jakobsdóttir and Australian Prime Minister Scott Morrison.
France	Paris	29–30 November	Talks with President Emmanuel Macron
Belgium	Brussels	15-16 December	Participated in the European Council session.
Ukraine	Kyiv	20 December	Participated in a trilateral meeting with Ukrainian president Volodymyr Zelenskyy and Polish president Andrzej Duda.

== 2022 ==
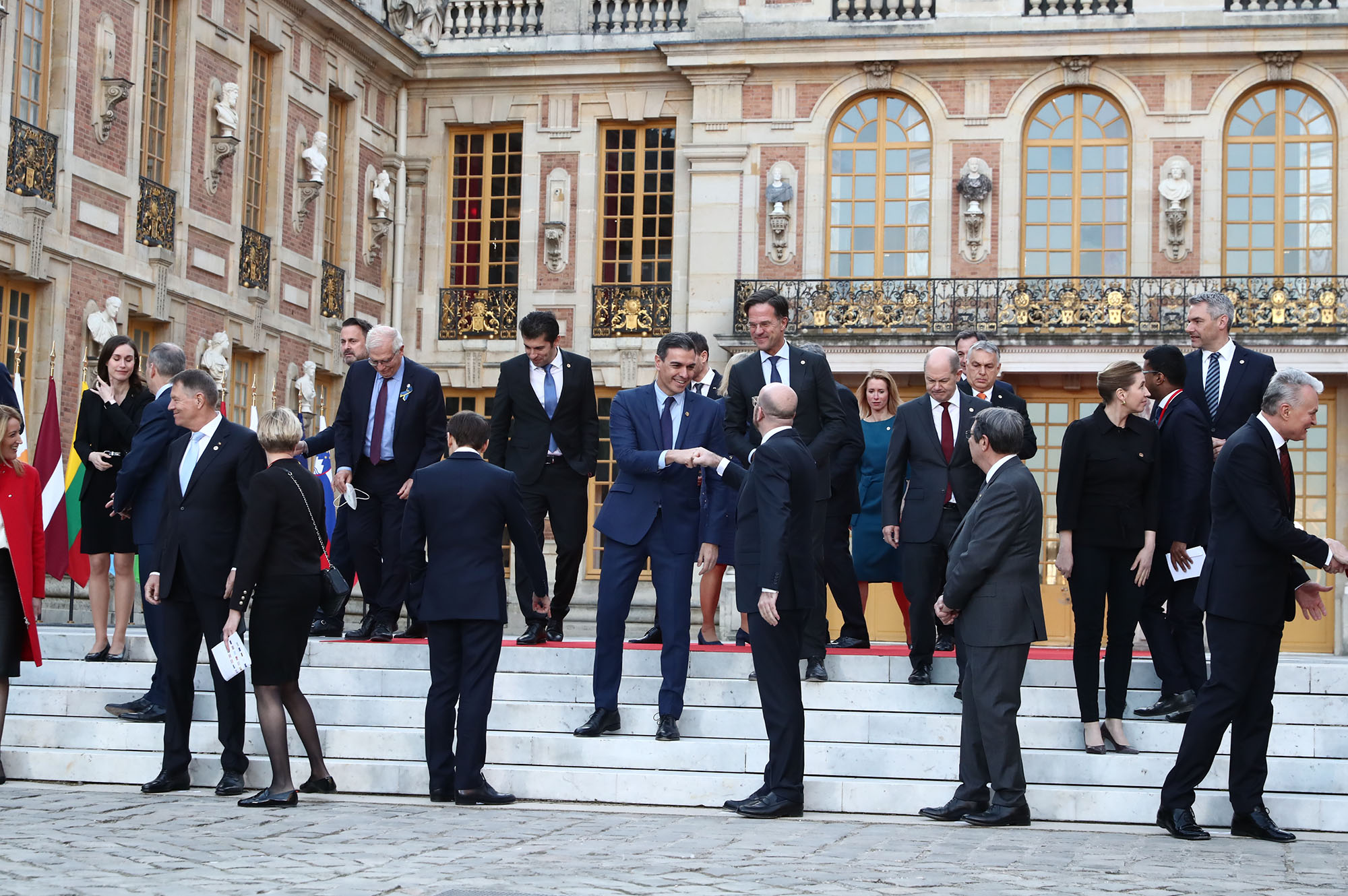
Heads of government preparing to take a group photo at the 2022 Versailles informal summit of EU Heads of State and Government.

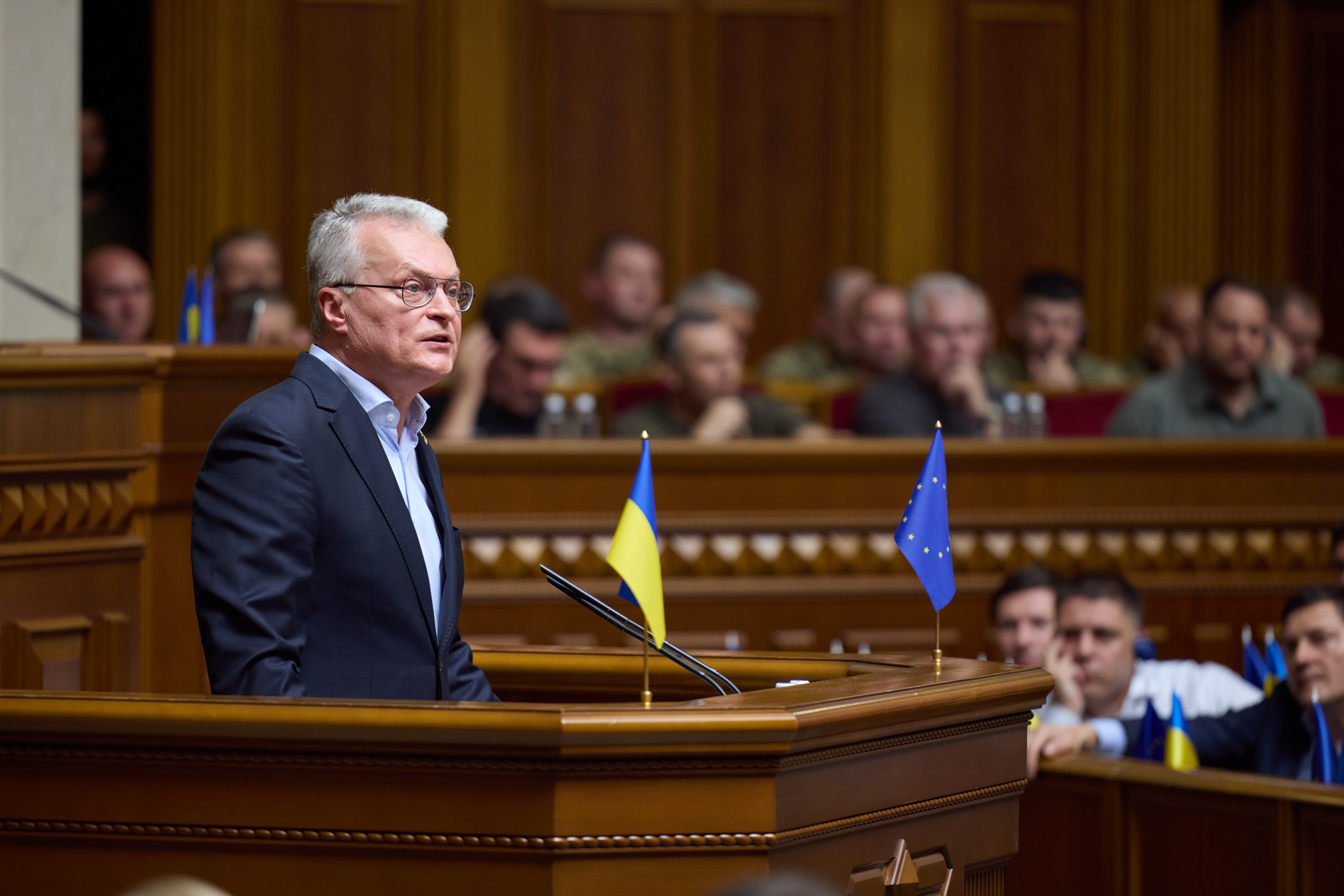
President Nausėda during speech in Ukrainian Parliament, 2022

Country	City	Date	Reason
Germany	Berlin	10 February	Together with Prime Minister of Estonia Kaja Kallas and Prime Minister of Latvia Arturs Krišjānis Kariņš met with Federal Chancellor Olaf Scholz in Berlin. The tense security situation in Europe and Ukraine were discussed.
Belgium	Brussels	17–18 February	Participated in the informal European Council meeting and NATO meeting, met with US Vice President Kamala Harris.
Ukraine	Kyiv	23 February	The day before the 2022 Russian invasion of Ukraine, President Nausėda together with his Polish counterpart Andrzej Duda visited Zelenskyy to express solidarity and support. During the visit, Nausėda said: "In the face of Russian aggression, Ukraine will not be left alone... We will support Ukraine with all possible means."
Belgium	Brussels	24 February	Nausėda attended a special meeting of the European Council to discuss the Russian invasion of Ukraine.
Poland	Warsaw	25 February	Participated in the NATO and Bucharest Nine leaders' meeting and the extraordinary meeting of the European Council, discussed the response to the Russian invasion of Ukraine.
Germany	Berlin	26 February	Met with German Chancellor Olaf Scholz and Polish Prime Minister Mateusz Morawiecki, discussed countermeasures to Russian military aggression in Ukraine.
France	Versailles, Yvelines	10–11 March	Participated in the informal meeting of the European Council.
United Kingdom	London	14–15 March	Nausėda attended Joint Expeditionary Force meeting.
Belgium	Brussels	24-25 March	Nausėda travelled to Brussels to attend the extraordinary NATO summit to discuss the Russian invasion of Ukraine.
Poland	Warsaw	12 April	Met with Polish President Andrzej Duda, German President Frank Walter Steinmeier, Latvian President Egils Levits, and Estonian President Alar Karis.
Ukraine	Kyiv	13 April	Met with Ukrainian President Volodymyr Zelenskyy, Polish President Andrzej Duda, Latvian President Egils Levits, Estonian President Alar Karis
Romania	Bucharest	6 May	Met with President Klaus Iohannis.
Moldova	Chișinău	7 May	Met with President Maia Sandu.
Azerbaijan	Baku	18 May	Met with President Ilham Aliyev.
Armenia	Yerevan	19–20 May	Met with President Vahagn Khachaturian.
Switzerland	Davos	23–25 May	Meeting of the World Economic Forum
Belgium	Brussels	30–31 May	Participated in an extraordinary meeting of the European Council.
Romania	Bucharest	10 June	Attended Bucharest Nine Summit.
Latvia	Riga	20 June	Participated in the seventh Three Seas Initiative summit.
Belgium	Brussels	23–24 June	Participated in the European Council meeting.
Spain	Madrid	28–30 June	Attendance to the 32nd NATO summit.
United States	Philadelphia	2–4 July	Met with US Lithuanian community, US business and defense representatives, and participated in the 16th North American Lithuanian Folk Dance Festival.
Poland	Szypliszki	7 July	Met with President Andrzej Duda.
Poland	Puńsk	21 July	Participated in the 16th World Lithuanian Youth Congress.
Poland	Warsaw	25–26 July	Met with President Andrzej Duda.
Ukraine	Kyiv	28 July	Met with Ukrainian President Volodymyr Zelenskyy and presented him with the Order of Vytautas the Great with a gold chain.
Iceland	Reykjavík	25–26 August	Reception with President Guðni Th. Jóhannesson
Denmark	Copenhagen	30 August	Participated in the Baltic Sea States Summit on Energy Issues.
United Kingdom	London	18–19 September	Attendance to the state funeral of Elizabeth II
United States	New York City	20–22 September	Attendance to the 77th United Nations General Assembly
Czech Republic	Prague	6–7 October	Tour of Czechia and talks with Czech leaders
Belgium	Brussels	20–21 October	Participated in the European Council meeting.
Poland	Warsaw	10–11 November	Met with President Andrzej Duda.
Czech Republic	Prague	16–17 November	Met with President Miloš Zeman and Prime Minister Petr Fiala.
Albania	Tirana	6 December	EU-Western Balkans summit
Belgium	Brussels	14–15 December	Participated in the European Union-Association of Southeast Asian Nations (ASEAN) summit.
Latvia	Riga	19 December	Summit of the member countries of the Joint Expeditionary Force

== 2023 ==
Country	City	Date	Reason	Image
Vatican City	Vatican City	5 January	Attended the funeral service of former Pope Benedict XVI.	
Ukraine	Lviv	11 January	Met with Ukrainian President Volodymyr Zelenskyy and Polish President Andrzej Duda. They held a meeting in the format of the Lublin Triangle.	
Switzerland	Davos	17–18 January	Meeting of the World Economic Forum	
Poland	Warsaw	24–25 January	Reception with President Andrzej Duda	
Belgium	Brussels	9–10 February	Meeting of the European Council	
Norway	Oslo	13–14 February	Talks with Prime Minister Jonas Gahr Støre and reception with King Harald V of Norway	
Germany	Munich	17–18 February	Meeting of the Munich Security Conference, talks with President Emmanuel Macron, President Egils Levits and Prime Minister Kaja Kallas	
Poland	Warsaw	23 February	Extraordinary Summit of the Bucharest Nine due to the Ukraine conflict, talks with President Joe Biden	
Belgium	Brussels	14 March	Address to members of the European Parliament	
Belgium	Brussels	23–24 March	Meeting of the European Council	
Netherlands	Amsterdam	17–18 April	Talks with Prime Minister Mark Rutte, King William Alexander and Head of the International Criminal Court Judge Piotr Hofmański	
Germany	Berlin	26–28 April	Talks with Chancellor Olaf Scholz and NATO leaders	
United Kingdom	London	5–6 May	Attendance to the Coronation of King Charles III	
Spain	Madrid	10–11 May	Talks with Prime Minister Pedro Sanchez and King Felipe VI	
Portugal	Lisbon	12 May	Talks with President Marcelo Rebelo de Sousa	
Iceland	Reykjavík	16–17 May	Nausėda attended the 4th Council of Europe summit.	
France	Paris	25–26 May	Reception and talks with President Emmanuel Macron	
Estonia	Tallinn	26 May	Met with the Prime Minister of Estonia Kaja Kallas, Prime Minister of Latvia Krišjānis Kariņš and German Chancellor Olaf Scholz. During the visit, issues of NATO security, defense cooperation and support for Ukraine were discussed.	
Moldova	Chișinău	2 June	Talks with President Volodymyr Zelenskyy	
Netherlands	The Hague	27–28 June	Talks with Prime Minister Mark Rutte and Secretary-General Jens Stoltenberg	
Slovakia	Bratislava	6–7 June	Meeting with NATO leaders and talks with Secretary-General Jens Stoltenberg. Attended Bucharest Nine Summit.	
Ukraine	Kyiv	28–30 June	Reception with President Volodymyr Zelenskyy and tour of Kyiv with President Andrzej Duda	
Belgium	Brussels	18 July	Attended EU, Latin American and Caribbean Leaders' Summit	
Poland	Suwalki	3 August	Talks with Prime Minister Mateusz Morawiecki	
Ukraine	Kyiv	23–24 August	Reception with President Volodymyr Zelenskyy and address to the Ukrainian people for Independence Day of Ukraine.	
United States	New York City	19–22 September	Address to the United Nations General Assembly and reception with President Joe Biden	
United States	Los Angeles	23–25 September	Reception with the American-Lithuanian community of Los Angeles	
Spain	Granada	5–6 October	3rd European Political Community Summit; Meeting of NATO leader and talks with President Volodymyr Zelenskyy	
Australia	Melbourne	17–18 October	Reception with the Australian-Lithuanian community of Melbourne and leaders of RMIT University	
Australia	Canberra	19–20 October	Reception with Prime Minister Anthony Albanese and Premier Peter Malinauskas	
Belgium	Brussels	26–27 October	Took part in the meeting of the European Council.	
Germany	Berlin	13 November	Met with President Frank-Walter Steinmeier. Nausėda met with Chancellor Olaf Scholz and President of the European Council Charles Michel during a Strategic Agenda consultation at the German Chancellery. The meeting was also attended by Austrian Chancellor Karl Nehammer, Belgian Prime Minister Alexander De Croo, Greek Prime Minister Kyriakos Mitsotakis, President of Cyprus Nikos Christodoulides, and Hungarian Prime Minister Viktor Orbán. The leaders discussed priorities for the European Union's next institutional cycle, including security and defence, competitiveness, energy, migration, enlargement, and institutional reforms.	
United Arab Emirates	Dubai	1–2 December	Attended 2023 United Nations Climate Change Conference.	
Estonia	Tallinn	11 December	Participated in the annual meeting of the Presidents of the three Baltic States.	
Belgium	Brussels	13–15 December	Participated in the European Council and the EU-Western Balkans summits.	

== 2024 ==
Country	City	Date	Reason	Image
Germany	Munich	16–18 February	Attended 60th Munich Security Conference	
Belgium	Brussels	21 March	Nausėda attended the European Council summit.	
Latvia	Riga	11 June	Attended Bucharest Nine summit.	
Switzerland	Lucerne	15–16 June	Attended Global Peace Summit	
Belgium	Brussels	27 June	Participation in the European Council.	
United States	Washington D.C.	9–11 July	2024 NATO summit	
United Kingdom	Woodstock	18 July	4th European Political Community Summit	
France	Paris	26 July	Nausėda travelled to Paris to attend the 2024 Summer Olympics opening ceremony.	
Ukraine	Kyiv	11 September	With Latvian Prime Minister Evika Siliņa arrived in Kyiv on the morning	
United States	New York City	24–30 September	Attended General debate of the seventy-ninth session of the United Nations General Assembly.	
Hungary	Budapest	7 November	5th European Political Community Summit	
Estonia	Tallinn	16–17 December	Nausėda attended the 2024 Joint Expeditionary Force summit.	
Belgium	Brussels	18 December	NATO Secretary General Mark Rutte welcomed Gitanas Nausėda to NATO Headquarters, to discuss NATO’s deterrence and defence and support to Ukraine.	

== 2025 ==
Country	City	Date	Reason	Image
Finland	Helsinki	14 January	Nausėda attended the Baltic Sea NATO Allies Summit in Helsinki. He also met with President of Finland Alexander Stubb, Prime Minister of Estonia Kristen Michal, NATO Secretary General Mark Rutte, and Vice-President of the European Commission Henna Virkkunen.	
Belgium	Brussels	3 February	Nausėda attended an informal European Council summit.	
Germany	Munich	14–16 February	Attended 61st Munich Security Conference	
Ukraine	Kyiv	24 February	Nausėda travelled to Kyiv to mark the third anniversary of the Russian invasion of Ukraine.	
Italy	Rome	3–4 March	Met with Prime Minister Giorgia Meloni	
Belgium	Brussels	20 March	Participation in the European Council working session.	
France	Paris	27 March	Nausėda attended a meeting of the "Coalition of the willing" hosted by President Macron.	
Vatican City	Vatican City	26 April	Nausėda attended the funeral of Pope Francis.	
Poland	Warsaw	28–29 April	Participated in the tenth Three Seas Initiative leaders' meeting.	
Norway	Oslo	9 May	Nausėda attended the 2025 Joint Expeditionary Force summit.	
Vatican City	Vatican City	17 May	Nausėda attended Papal inauguration of Pope Leo XIV	
Japan	Tokyo	9–10 June	Met with Prime Minister Shigeru Ishiba, the two leaders also had a working dinner for approximately 90 minutes.	
Japan	Osaka	11 June	Attended Expo 2025 Osaka	
Vietnam	Hanoi	12 June	Nausėda departed Hanoi on June 12 evening, concluding their two-day official visit to Vietnam at the invitation of State President Luong Cuong.	
Netherlands	The Hague	23–25 June	Nausėda attended the 2025 NATO summit.	
Belgium	Brussels	26–27 June	Nausėda attended the European Council meeting.	
Estonia	Tallinn	4 July	Met with Estonian President Alar Karis and Latvian President Edgars Rinkēvičs. They discussed Russia's aggression against Ukraine, developments in the Middle East, regional security matters, and infrastructure projects such as Rail Baltic and Via Baltica. They will also address transatlantic relations in light of the recent NATO summit in The Hague.	
Ireland	Dublin	10–11 July	Met with Taoiseach Micheál Martin and Tánaiste and Minister for Foreign Affairs and Trade, Simon Harris. Also met with President Michael D. Higgins.	
Poland	Warsaw	28 August	Met with Karol Nawrocki, the presidents of Estonia, Alar Karis, and Latvia, Edgars Rinkēvičs and Danish Prime Minister Mette Frederiksen. These discussions with the leaders from the region are a preparatory step for the Polish President’s upcoming visit to Washington, DC, next week. They also took part in a teleconference with Ukrainian president Volodymyr Zelenskyy.	
Finland	Tampere, Helsinki	1-2 September	Attended the EuroBasket 2025 Group B game between Finland and Lithuania. Met with Prime Minister Petteri Orpo.	
Denmark	Copenhagen	3 September	Met with Prime Minister Mette Frederiksen, President Volodymyr Zelenskyy and other leaders. Attended the Nordic-Baltic Eight summit.	
United States	New York City	23 September	Attended General debate of the eightieth session of the United Nations General Assembly.	
Denmark	Copenhagen	2 October	Attended the 7th European Political Community Summit.	
Italy	Rome	4–5 October	Met with the President Sergio Mattarella. Their meeting will focus on bilateral relations between Lithuania and Italy, strengthening European defense, and support for Ukraine. Later, the President will deliver an opening address at the Lithuania–Italy Defense Industry Forum.	
Vatican City	Vatican City	6 October	Nausėda met with Pope Leo XIV. Talks praised strong ties and urged diplomatic efforts to end the Ukraine war and prevent further conflict escalation.	
Belgium	Brussels	23 October	Attended the 252nd European Council summit.	
Latvia	Riga	4 December	Attended the annual pre-Christmas meeting. Met with Estonian President Alar Karis and Latvian President Edgars Rinkēvičs. They discussed issues related to regional security, further steps in strengthening energy security, current issues of the European Union, as well as support for Ukraine.	
Finland	Helsinki	16 December	Met with Prime Minister Petteri Orpo, Swedish Prime Minister Ulf Kristersson, Estonian Prime Minister Kristen Michal, Latvian Prime Minister Evika Siliņa, Polish Prime Minister Donald Tusk, Romanian President Nicușor Dan and Bulgarian Prime Minister Rosen Zhelyazkov at the Eastern Front Summit in Helsinki, where the discussion focused on Europe securing its Eastern Front at a faster pace and through joint initiatives.	

== 2026 ==
Country	Location(s)	Dates	Details	Image
France	Paris	6 January	Nausėda attended the Coalition of the Willing meeting in Paris with fellow leaders.	
Germany	Berlin	7–8 January	On Wednesday, He delivered a keynote address at the annual meeting of the Bundestag’s Christian Social Union (CSU) parliamentary group, where the security situation in Europe will be discussed. On Thursday, He met with German Federal Chancellor Friedrich Merz to discuss bilateral cooperation, with particular focus on progress regarding the deployment of the German brigade in Lithuania and the strengthening of NATO’s eastern flank.	
Belgium	Brussels	23 January	Attended the extraordinary meeting of the European Council.	
Italy	Milan	6 February	Attended the 2026 Winter Olympics.	
Belgium	Antwerp, Rijkhoven	11–12 February	Nausėda attended the 3rd European Industry Summit. Next day participated in the informal meeting of EU heads of state and government.	
Germany	Munich	13–15 February	Attended 62nd Munich Security Conference.	
Belgium	Brussels	19–20 March	Nausėda attended the European Council.	
Finland	Helsinki	26 March	Nausėda attended the 2026 JEF Leaders’ Summit.	
Cyprus	Nicosia	23–24 April	Nausėda attended an informal meeting of the European Council summit.	
Croatia	Dubrovnik	28–29 April	Attended the 11th Three Seas Initiative summit.	
Romania	Bucharest	13 May	Attended the Bucharest Nine summit.	
Slovenia	Ljubljana	3 June	Met with President Nataša Pirc Musar. The two leaders discussed bilateral relations between Lithuania and Slovenia, European Union enlargement policy, the future of the Western Balkans, strengthening Europe’s competitiveness, and support for Ukraine.	
Albania	Tirana	4 June	Met with President Bajram Begaj to discuss strengthening bilateral relations, Albania’s accession to the European Union, regional security, and cooperation within NATO. The leaders also exchanged views on the situation in the Western Balkans, support for Kosovo, and continued assistance to Ukraine. They further emphasized expanding economic cooperation and confirmed Lithuania’s support for EU enlargement, including Albania’s membership aspirations and the integration of the Western Balkans into the European Union.	
Montenegro	Tivat	5 June	Nausėda attended the EU–Western Balkans Summit.	
Belgium	Brussels	18–19 June	Attended the European Council.	
Poland	Jurata, Poznań	27–29 June	On the 1st day, Gitanas Nausėda, together with Estonian President Alar Karis, Latvian President Edgars Rinkēvičs, Slovak President Peter Pellegrini, Czech President Petr Pavel, and Romanian President Nicușor Dan, met with Polish President Karol Nawrocki in Jurata for an informal meeting, where the discussion focused on preparations for the NATO Ankara Summit, strengthening European defense capabilities, and continued support for Ukraine. On next day, they participated in a commemoration event in Poznań to mark the 70th anniversary of the protests.	
Germany	Berlin	3 July	In the afternoon, Gitanas Nausėda, together with Estonian Prime Minister Kristen Michal and Latvian President Edgars Rinkēvičs, met with Federal Chancellor of the Federal Republic of Germany Friedrich Merz in a B3+1 format in Berlin, where they discussed close cooperation in supporting Ukraine, protecting Europe's eastern flank, and in the field of the defense industry, in order to coordinate positions before the NATO Ankara Summit.	
Turkey	Ankara	7–8 July	Nausėda attended the 2026 Ankara NATO summit.	
Ukraine	Kyiv	23 August	Gitanas Nausėda, together with Finnish President Alexander Stubb, Latvian Prime Minister Andris Kulbergs, Estonian Prime Minister Kristen Michal, Danish Prime Minister Mette Frederiksen and Norwegian Prime Minister Jonas Gahr Støre, met unannounced with Ukrainian President Volodymyr Zelenskyy and Ukrainian Prime Minister Serhii Koretskyi on the sidelines of the NB8 summit in Kyiv to discuss winter preparations, protection and restoration of key energy infrastructure, and preparations for the Ukrainian reconstruction conference to be held in Tallinn in January next year. Gitanas Nausėda and the leaders participated in events related to the Ukrainian National Flag Day.	
Norway	Oslo	9 September	Nausėda travelled to Oslo at the invitation of King Haakon VIII of Norway to attend the funeral of King Harald V of Norway.	
Finland	Rovaniemi	13–14 September	Nausėda travelled the European Arctic Summit.	
United States	New York City	21-25 September	Nausėda is attended the 81st United Nations General Assembly.	
Belgium	Brussels	15–16 October	Nausėda attended the European Council.	

== Future trips ==
Country	Location	Date	Details
Ireland	Dublin	12 November	Nausėda is plan to attend the 9th European Political Community Summit.
Turkey	Antalya	November	Nausėda is scheduled to attend the 2026 United Nations Climate Change Conference.

== Multilateral meetings ==
Multilateral meetings of the following intergovernmental organizations took place during Gitanas Nausėda's presidency (2019–Present).

Group	Year							
Group	2019	2020	2021	2022	2023	2024	2025	2026
UNGA	23–25 September, (United States) New York City	26 September, (videoconference) (United States) New York City	20–23 September, (United States) New York City	20–26 September, (United States) New York City	19–26 September, (United States) New York City	24–30 September, (United States) New York City	23 September, (United States) New York City	22–25 September, (United States) New York City
NATO	3–4 December, (United Kingdom) Watford	None	14 June, (Belgium) Brussels	24 March, (Belgium) Brussels	11–12 July, (Lithuania) Vilnius	9–11 July, (United States) Washington, D.C.	24–26 June, (Netherlands) The Hague	7–8 July, (Turkey) Ankara
NATO	3–4 December, (United Kingdom) Watford	None	14 June, (Belgium) Brussels	June 28–30, (Spain) Madrid	11–12 July, (Lithuania) Vilnius	9–11 July, (United States) Washington, D.C.	24–26 June, (Netherlands) The Hague	7–8 July, (Turkey) Ankara
Bucharest Nine		None	10 May, (Romania) Bucharest	25 February, (Poland) Warsaw	22 February, (Poland) Warsaw	11 June, (Latvia) Riga	2 June, (Lithuania) Vilnius	13 May, (Romania) Bucharest
Bucharest Nine		None	10 May, (Romania) Bucharest	10 June, (Romania) Bucharest	6 June, (Slovakia) Bratislava	11 June, (Latvia) Riga	2 June, (Lithuania) Vilnius	13 May, (Romania) Bucharest
Three Seas Initiative		19 October, (videoconference) (Estonia) Tallinn	8–9 July, (Bulgaria) Sofia	20–21 June, (Latvia) Riga	6–7 September, (Romania) Bucharest	11 April, (Lithuania) Vilnius	28–29 April, (Poland) Warsaw	28–29 April, (Croatia) Dubrovnik
EU–CELAC	None				17–18 July, (Belgium) Brussels	None	9–10 November, (Colombia) Santa Marta	None
EPC	Didn't exist			6 October, (Czech Republic) Prague	1 June, (Moldova) Bulboaca	18 July, (United Kingdom) Woodstock	16 May, (Albania) Tirana	4 May, (Armenia) Yerevan
EPC	Didn't exist			6 October, (Czech Republic) Prague	5 October, (Spain) Granada	7 November, (Hungary) Budapest	2 October, (Denmark) Copenhagen	12 November, (Republic of Ireland) Dublin
UNCCC	2–13 December (Spain) Madrid	None	1–2 November (United Kingdom) Glasgow	7–8 November,^{[a]} (Egypt) Sharm el-Sheikh	30 November – 3 December (United Arab Emirates) Dubai	12 November (Azerbaijan) Baku	10 November, (Brazil) Belém	November (Turkey) Antalya
JEF	None			14–15 March, (United Kingdom) London	12–13 October, (Sweden) Visby	16–17 December, (Estonia) Tallinn	9 May, (Norway) Oslo	26 March, (Finland) Helsinki
JEF	None			19 December, (Latvia) Riga	12–13 October, (Sweden) Visby	16–17 December, (Estonia) Tallinn	9 May, (Norway) Oslo	26 March, (Finland) Helsinki
Others	None				Coronation of King Charles III and Queen Camilla; 5–6 May, (United Kingdom) London	Global Peace Summit; 15–16 June, (Switzerland) Lucerne	15 March, (videoconference); United Kingdom	Together for peace and security summit 6 January, (France) Paris
Others	None				Coronation of King Charles III and Queen Camilla; 5–6 May, (United Kingdom) London	Global Peace Summit; 15–16 June, (Switzerland) Lucerne	Building a robust peace for Ukraine and Europe; 27 March, (France) Paris	Together for peace and security summit 6 January, (France) Paris
██ = Future event ██ = Did not attend / participate.^a He cancelled his participation in COP27, after his father Antanas Nausėda passed away on Sunday.
