= List of international prime ministerial trips made by Pedro Sánchez =

This is a list of international prime ministerial trips made by Pedro Sánchez, the current Prime Minister of Spain since June 2, 2018.

== Summary ==
Travel of Pedro Sánchez as the prime minister of Spain: Spain 1 visit 2 visits 3 visits 4 visits 5-9 visits 10 or More visits

Sánchez has visited 80 countries during his tenure as prime minister. The number of visits per country where Sánchez has traveled are:

- One visit to Andorra, Angola, Armenia, Azerbaijan, Bolivia, Bosnia and Herzegovina, Canada, Cuba, the Czech Republic, Ecuador, Estonia, Gambia, Guatemala, Honduras, Indonesia, Israel, Japan, Kenya, Lebanon, Libya, Luxembourg, Malaysia, Mali, Mexico, North Macedonia, Norway, Palestine, Paraguay, Qatar, Saudi Arabia, Serbia, Slovakia, South Korea, Uruguay, Vietnam
- Two visits to Algeria, Argentina, Austria, Costa Rica, Croatia, Denmark, Finland, Greece, India, Iraq, Ireland, Jordan, Latvia, Lithuania, Malta, Moldova, Montenegro, the Netherlands, Romania, Senegal, Sweden
- Three visits to Albania, Brazil, Chile, Colombia, Cyprus, Dominican Republic, Poland, Turkey, the United Arab Emirates, Vatican City
- Four visits to China, Egypt, Mauritania, Slovenia
- Five visits to Germany, Morocco, Ukraine
- Six visits to United Kingdom
- Eight visits to Italy and Portugal
- Ten visits to Switzerland
- Eleven visits to the United States
- Twenty-five visits to France
- Sixty-one visits to Belgium

== 2018 ==
Country	Location(s)	Dates	Details
France	Paris	23 June	Meeting with President Emmanuel Macron
Belgium	Brussels	24 June	Participation in an informal meeting of the European Council on migration and asylum
Germany	Berlin	26 June	Meeting with Chancellor Angela Merkel.
Belgium	Brussels	28-29 June	Participation in the European Council
France	Paris	29 June	Meeting with the mayor of Paris Anne Hidalgo
Portugal	Lisbon	2 July	Meeting with Prime Minister António Costa.
Belgium	Brussels	11-12 July	Sánchez attended the NATO summit.
Portugal	Lisbon	27 July	Participation in the II Summit for Energy Interconnections
Chile	Santiago	27-28 August	Meeting with President Sebastián Piñera
Bolivia	La Paz	28-29 August	Meeting with President Evo Morales
Colombia	Bogotá	29-30 August	Meeting with President Iván Duque Márquez
Costa Rica	San José	30-31 August	Meeting with President Carlos Alvarado Quesada
Dominican Republic	Santo Domingo	31 August	Technical stop for refueling Meeting with the Minister of Foreign Affairs Miguel Vargas
Sweden	Enköping	5 September	Meeting with Prime Minister Stefan Löfven
Austria	Salzburg	19-20 September	Participation in an extraordinary meeting of the European Council
Canada	Montreal	23 September	Meeting with Prime Minister Justin Trudeau
United States	New York City	24-28 September	Attended the 73rd United Nations General Assembly
United States	Sacramento and Los Angeles	28-30 September	Meeting with Governor Jerry Brown; Attendance at the University of Southern California Conference
Belgium	Brussels	17-19 October	Participation in the European Council and participation in the ASEM Asia-Europe Summit on 18 October.
Italy	Milan	27 October	Participation in an event of the Italian Democratic Party
France	Paris	11 November	Attendance at the ceremony commemorating the Centenary of the Armistice
Guatemala	Antigua Guatemala	15-16 November	Participation in the XXVI Ibero-American Summit
Morocco	Rabat	19 November	Meeting with the king of Morocco, Mohammed VI and the Head of Government of Morocco, Saadeddine Othmani
Cuba	Havana	22-23 November	Meeting with President Miguel Díaz-Canel
Belgium	Brussels	25 November	Participation in the Extraordinary Meeting of the European Council on Brexit
Argentina	Buenos Aires	30 November-1 December	Participation in the G-20 Summit in Buenos Aires
Poland	Katowice	3 December	Participation in the COP24 Climate Summit
Morocco	Marrakesh	10 December	Attendance at the UN International Conference on Migration
Belgium	Brussels	13-14 December	Participation in the European Council
Mali	Bamako	27 December	Visit to the Spanish troops in Mali. Meeting with the prime minister Soumeylou Boubèye Maïga

== 2019 ==
Country	Location(s)	Dates	Details
France	Strasbourg	16 January	Address by the prime minister to the European Parliament
Switzerland	Davos	23-24 January	Attendance at the 49th Annual Meeting of the World Economic Forum
Dominican Republic	Santo Domingo	29 January	Meeting with President Danilo Medina
Mexico	Mexico City	30-31 January	Meeting with President Andrés Manuel López Obrador
France	Strasbourg	7 February	Visit to the headquarters of the Council of Europe. Visit to the headquarters of the European Court of Human Rights.
France	Montauban, Collioure, and Argelès-sur-Mer	24 February	Attendance at the events commemorating the 80th anniversary of the death of Antonio Machado and the beginning of the Spanish exile.
Belgium	Brussels	21-22 March	Participation in the European Council.
Belgium	Brussels	10 April	Participation in the extraordinary meeting of the European Council on Brexit.
Romania	Sibiu	9 May	Participation in the European Council.
France	Paris	27 May	Dinner with the president of France, Emmanuel Macron, to discuss the results of the European Parliament election.
Belgium	Brussels	28 May	Participation in the informal summit of the European Union following the European elections.
Belgium	Brussels	7 June	Attendance at the informal dinner on the negotiation of the senior officials of the Union.
Malta	Valletta	14 June	Attendance at the VI Summit of Southern European Countries.
Belgium	Brussels	20-21 June	Participation in the European Council.
Japan	Osaka	28-29 June	Sánchez attended the G20 summit.
Belgium	Brussels	30 June-2 July	Attendance at the extraordinary meeting of the European Council.
France	Biarritz	25 August	Sánchez attended the G7 summit.
United States	New York City	23-26 September	Attended the 74th United Nations General Assembly and the Climate Action Summit.
Belgium	Brussels	17-18 October	Participation in the European Council.
United Kingdom	London, Watford	3–4 December	Sánchez travelled to Watford to attend the 30th NATO summit.
Belgium	Brussels	12-13 December	Participation in the European Council.

== 2020 ==
Country	Location(s)	Dates	Details
Switzerland	Davos	21-22 January	Attendance at the 50th Annual Meeting of the World Economic Forum.
Belgium	Brussels	5 February	Meeting with the president of the European Council, Charles Michel
Belgium	Brussels	20-21 February	Participation in the extraordinary meeting of the European Council on the European Union budget.
Mauritania	Nouakchott	30 June	Attendance at the G5 Sahel Summit
Portugal	Elvas	1 July	Official reopening ceremony of the Spanish-Portuguese border.
Portugal	Lisbon	6 July	Meeting with the prime minister António Costa
Netherlands	The Hague	13 July	Meeting with Prime Minister Mark Rutte.
Germany	Berlin	14 July	Meeting with Chancellor Angela Merkel.
Sweden	Flen	14-15 July	Meeting with Prime Minister Stefan Löfven.
France	Paris	15 July	Meeting with President Emmanuel Macron and Mayor Anne Hidalgo
Belgium	Brussels	17-21 July	Participation in the extraordinary European Council on the Recovery Plan in response to the COVID-19 crisis.
France	Ajaccio	10 September	Attendance at the VII Summit of Southern European Countries
Belgium	Brussels	23 September	Meeting with NATO secretary general Jens Stoltenberg, High Representative for Foreign Affairs and Security Josep Borrell, Commissioner for Economy Paolo Gentiloni, and President of the European Commission Ursula von der Leyen.
Belgium	Brussels	1-2 October	Participation in the extraordinary meeting of the European Council on the Union's foreign policy.
Algeria	Algiers	7-8 October	Meeting with the president of Algeria, Abdelmadjid Tebboune, and with the prime minister, Abdelaziz Djerad.
Portugal	Guarda	10 October	Participation in the XXXI Spanish-Portuguese Summit.
Belgium	Brussels	15-16 October	Participation in the European Council.
Italy	Rome	20 October	Participation, together with the president of the Council of Ministers, Giuseppe Conte, in the closing of the XVII Spain-Italy Dialogue Forum.
Vatican City	Vatican City	24 October	Audience with Pope Francis.
Belgium	Brussels	10-11 December	Participation in the European Council.
France	Paris	14 December	Attendance at events commemorating the 60th Anniversary of the OECD.

== 2021 ==
Country	Location(s)	Dates	Details
France	Montauban	15 March	Participation in the XXVI Franco-Spanish Summit
Angola	Luanda	8 April	Meeting with the president João Manuel Gonçalves Lourenço
Senegal	Dakar	9 April	Meeting with the president Macky Sall
Andorra	Andorra la Vella	21-22 April	Participation in the XXVII Ibero-American Summit
Portugal	Porto	7-8 May	Attendance at the Social Summit and informal meeting of Heads of State and Government of the European Union and at the European Union-India High-Level Meeting
Greece	Athens	10 May	Meeting with the prime minister Kyriakos Mitsotakis. Attendance at the Delphi Economic Forum
Belgium	Brussels	24-25 May	Participation in the extraordinary meeting of the European Council on climate change and foreign policy
Libya	Tripoli	3 June	Meeting with the president of the Libyan Presidential Council, Mohamed al-Menfi; Meeting with the prime minister of the Libyan Government of National Accord, Abdul Hamid Dbeibeh
Argentina	Buenos Aires	9 June	Meeting with President Alberto Fernández
Costa Rica	San José	10-11 June	Participation in the Extraordinary Summit of Heads of State and Government of the SICA and Spain. Meeting with President Carlos Alvarado Quesada
Belgium	Brussels	14 June	Sánchez attended the 31st NATO summit.
Belgium	Brussels	24-25 June	Participation in the European Council.
Estonia	Tallinn	6-7 July	Meeting with the president Kersti Kaljulaid and with the prime minister Kaja Kallas; Meeting with the speaker of the Estonian Parliament, Jüri Ratas.
Latvia	Riga, Ādaži	7 July	Meeting with the prime minister Arturs Krišjānis Kariņš and with the speaker of the Latvian Parliament, Ināra Mūrniece; Visit to the Spanish troops deployed in the country
Lithuania	Šiauliai, Vilnius	8 July	Meeting with the president Gitanas Nausėda and with the prime minister Ingrida Šimonytė; Visit to the Spanish troops deployed in the country
United States	New York City, Los Angeles, and San Francisco	20-24 July	Economic and investment promotion trip to the United States
Greece	Athens	17 September	Attendance at the VIII Summit of Southern European Countries
United States	New York City	22 September	Attended the 76th United Nations General Assembly.
Slovenia	Brdo Pri Kranju	5-6 October	Participation in the European Union-Western Balkans Summit
Croatia	Zagreb	6 October	Meeting with the president Zoran Milanović, Prime Minister Andrej Plenković and the speaker of the Parliament of the Republic of Croatia, Gordan Jandrokovic.
Belgium	Brussels	21-22 October	Participation in the European Council.
Italy	Rome	29-31 October	Sánchez attended the G20 summit.
United Kingdom	Glasgow	1 November	Sánchez travelled to Glasgow to attend the 2021 United Nations Climate Change Conference.
France	Paris	12 November	Participation in the International Summit on Libya and in the XLI UNESCO General Conference
Turkey	Ankara	17 November	Participation in the VII Türkiye-Spain High Level Meeting
Egypt	Cairo	30 November-1 December	Meeting with the president Abdel Fattah El-Sisi, Prime Minister Mostafa Madbouly and the secretary-general of the Arab League, Ahmed Aboul Gheit.
Belgium	Brussels	15-16 December	Participation in the European Council and the 6th European Union-Eastern Partnership Summit.

== 2022 ==
Country	Location(s)	Dates	Details
Italy	Rome	14 January	Attendance at the state funeral of the president of the European Parliament, David Sassoli
UAE	Dubai	2 February	Attendance at Spain Day at the Dubai World Expo
Belgium	Brussels	17-18 February	Participation in the informal European Council meeting on the 2021-2022 Russian-Ukrainian crisis. Participation in the 6th European Union-African Union Summit.
Belgium	Brussels	24 February	Participation in an extraordinary meeting of the European Council on the 2022 invasion of Ukraine.
Latvia	Riga	8 March	Sánchez travelled to Riga to meet with Prime Minister Krišjānis Kariņš. He also met with Canadian prime minister Justin Trudeau and NATO secretary general Jens Stoltenberg. Visit to NATO troops in the country
France	Versailles	10-11 March	Attendance at the informal summit of the Heads of State and Government of the European Union
Slovakia	Bratislava	16 March	Meeting with the prime minister Eduard Heger
Romania	Bucharest	17 March	Meeting with the president Klaus Iohannis and the prime minister Nicolae Ciucă.
Italy	Rome	18 March	Meeting with the prime minister Mario Draghi, Portuguese prime minister António Costa, and Greek prime minister Kyriakos Mitsotakis.
Germany	Berlin	18 March	Meeting with the chancellor Olaf Scholz.
France	Paris	21 March	Meeting with the president Emmanuel Macron.
Belgium	Brussels	21 March	Meeting with the prime minister Alexander De Croo, and President of the European Council, Charles Michel.
Belgium	Brussels	24-25 March	Sánchez travelled to Brussels to attend an extraordinary NATO summit to discuss the Russian invasion of Ukraine. He also attended the European Council.
Morocco	Rabat	7 April	Meeting with the king of Morocco, Mohammed VI
Ukraine	Kyiv, Borodianka	21 April	Together with Danish prime minister Mette Frederiksen travelled to Kyiv to meet with President Volodymyr Zelenskyy. He said that Spain has sent a new batch of 200 tons of ammunition and military supplies to Ukraine, more than doubling the quantity of military aid it has sent so far.
Switzerland	Davos	23-24 May	Attendance at the 51st Annual Meeting of the World Economic Forum.
Belgium	Brussels	30-31 May	Participation in an extraordinary meeting of the European Council.
Moldova	Chișinău	3 June	Meeting with the president Maia Sandu and Prime Minister Natalia Gavrilița
Belgium	Brussels	22-24 June	Meeting with the president of the European Parliament, Roberta Metsola. Attendance at the renaming of a European Parliament building as "Clara Campoamor". Participation in the meeting of the European Council on 23 June.
Switzerland	Geneva	6-7 July	Meeting with the director-general of the World Trade Organization, Ngozi Okonjo-Iweala and Director-general of the World Health Organization, Tedros Adhanom
Belgium	Brussels	26 July	Participation in the extraordinary meeting of the European Council on energy
Poland	Warsaw	27 July	Participation in the XIV Spanish-Polish Summit
Serbia	Belgrad	29-30 July	Meeting with the president of the Republic of Serbia, Aleksandar Vučić, and the speaker of the Serbian Assembly, Ivica Dačić
Bosnia and Herzegovina	Sarajevo and Mostar	30 July	Meeting with the presidents of Bosnia and Herzegovina, Šefik Džaferović, Željko Komšić and Milorad Dodik. Tribute to the Spanish soldiers who fell in the Yugoslav Wars
Montenegro	Podgorica	31 July	Meeting with the president Milo Đukanović and the prime minister Dritan Abazović
North Macedonia	Skopje	31 July	Meeting with the president Stevo Pendarovski, and the prime minister Dimitar Kovačevski
Albania	Tirana	1 August	Meeting with the president Bajram Begaj, and the prime minister Edi Rama.
Colombia	Bogotá	24 August	Meeting with the president Gustavo Petro
Ecuador	Quito	25 August	Meeting with the president Guillermo Lasso
Honduras	Tegucigalpa	26 August	Meeting with the president Xiomara Castro
Germany	Gransee	30 August	Attendance, as guest of honor, at the meeting of the Federal Government of Germany. Meeting with the federal chancellor Olaf Scholz
Germany	Berlin	18 September	Attendance at the EuroBasket 2022 final featuring the Spanish National Basketball Team.
United States	New York City	19-22 September	Attended the 77th United Nations General Assembly.
Czech Republic	Prague	6–7 October	Sánchez attended at Prague Castle the 1st European Political Community Summit and an informal European Council.
Germany	Berlin	14 October	Working meeting with the German chancellor Olaf Scholz, and the Portuguese prime minister António Costa.
Belgium	Brussels	20-21 October	Participation in the meeting of the European Council
Kenya	Nairobi	26 October	Meeting with the president William Ruto
South Africa	Pretoria	27 October	Meeting with the president Cyril Ramaphosa
Portugal	Braga, Viana do Castelo	4 November	Participation in the XXXIII Spanish-Portuguese Summit
Egypt	Sharm El Sheikh	7 November	Sánchez travelled to Sharm El Sheikh to attend the 2022 United Nations Climate Change Conference.
Indonesia	Bali	14–16 November	Sánchez attended the G20 summit.
South Korea	Seoul	17-18 November	Participation in the XIV Spain-Korea Tribune
Belgium	Brussels	14-15 December	Participation in the Summit of the European Union and the Association of Southeast Asian Nations. Participation in the European Council working session on 15 December.
Lebanon	Marjayoun	28 December	Visit to the Miguel de Cervantes Base; Meeting with the prime minister of Lebanon Najib Mikati, and the speaker of the Lebanese Parliament, Nabih Berri

== 2023 ==
Country	Location(s)	Dates	Details
Switzerland	Davos	16-17 January	Attendance at the 52nd Annual Meeting of the World Economic Forum
Morocco	Rabat	1-2 February	Attendance at the XII Morocco-Spain High Level Meeting
Belgium	Brussels	9-10 February	Participation in the extraordinary meeting of the European Council
Austria	Vienna	16 February	Meeting with the federal chancellor Karl Nehammer
Croatia	Zagreb	16 February	Meeting with the prime minister Andrej Plenković
Slovenia	Kranj	17 February	Meeting with the prime minister Robert Golob
Ukraine	Bucha, Irpin and Kyiv	23 February	Meeting with the president of Volodymyr Zelenskyy. Appears before the Verkhovna Rada. Visits the cities of Bucha and Irpin.
Ireland	Dublin	2 March	Meeting with the prime minister of the Republic Leo Varadkar
Denmark	Lyngby-Taarbæk	2 March	Meeting with the prime minister Mette Frederiksen
Finland	Helsinki	3 March	Meeting with the prime minister Sanna Marin
Belgium	Brussels	23-24 March	Meeting with the prime minister Alexander De Croo; Participation in the meeting of the European Council
Dominican Republic	Santo Domingo	24-26 March	Attendance at the XXVIII Ibero-American Summit; Meeting with President Luis Abinader
China	Hainan and Beijing	30-31 March	Meeting with President Xi Jinping; Attendance at the Boao Forum for Asia
Cyprus	Nicosia	4 April	Meeting with the president Nikos Christodoulidis.
Malta	Valletta	4 April	Meeting with the prime minister Robert Abela
Italy	Rome	5 April	Meeting with the prime minister Giorgia Meloni
Portugal	Porto	23 April	Meeting with the prime minister António Costa
United States	Washington, D.C.	11-12 May	Sánchez holds a bilateral meeting with President Joe Biden at the White House.
Moldova	Bulboaca	1 June	Sánchez attended the second summit of the European Political Community.
Belgium	Brussels	29-30 June	Participation in the working session of the European Council
Ukraine	Kyiv	1 July	Meeting with the president Volodymyr Zelenskyy; Appears before the Verkhovna Rada
Lithuania	Vilnius	11–12 July	Sánchez travelled to Vilnius to attend the 33rd NATO summit.
Belgium	Brussels	17-18 July	Attended the 3rd EU–CELAC summit
United States	New York City	17-20 September	Attended the 78th United Nations General Assembly.
Albania	Tirana	16 October	Attendance at the Berlin Process Summit
Egypt	Cairo	21 October	Participation in the 'Cairo for Peace' Summit
Belgium	Brussels	25-27 October	Attendance at the European Council working meeting
Israel	Jerusalem	23 November	Meeting with the president Isaac Herzog and the prime minister Benjamin Netanyahu
Palestine	Ramallah	23 November	Meeting with the president Mahmoud Abbas
Egypt	Cairo	24 November	Meeting with the president Abdel Fattah El-Sisi and with the secretary-general of the Arab League, Ahmed Aboul Gheit; Visit to the Rafah Pass
UAE	Dubai	30 November-1 December	Attendance at the United Nations Climate Change Conference.
Germany	Berlin	9 December	Meeting with the federal chancellor Olaf Scholz
France	Strasbourg	13 December	Attendance at the European Parliament plenary session on the final assessment of the Spanish presidency of the Council of the European Union
Belgium	Brussels	13 December	Participation in the Summit between the European Union and the Western Balkan countries
Belgium	Brussels	14-15 December	Participation in the European Council
Iraq	Baghdad	28 December	Meeting with the president of the Republic of Iraq, Abdul Latif Rashid; Meeting with the prime minister of the Republic of Iraq, Mohammed Shia' Al Sudani; Visit to the Spanish troops stationed in the country

== 2024 ==
Country	Location(s)	Dates	Details
Switzerland	Davos	16-17 January	Attendance at the 53rd Annual Meeting of the World Economic Forum
Belgium	Brussels	31 January-1 February	Attendance at the tribute to Jacques Delors, who died in December 2023; Participation in the extraordinary meeting of the European Council.
Mauritania	Nouakchott	8 February	Meeting with the president Mohamed Ould Ghazouani and the president of the European Commission, Ursula von der Leyen
Morocco	Rabat	20 February	Meeting with the king Mohammed VI and the prime minister Aziz Akhannouch
France	Paris	26 February	Attendance at the Ukraine Aid Conference
Brazil	Brasília	6-7 March	Meeting with the president Lula da Silva
Chile	Santiago	8 March	Meeting with the president Gabriel Boric
Belgium	Brussels	21-22 March	Participation in the European Council
Jordan	Amman	2 April	Meeting with King Abdullah II. Visit the UNRWA Palestinian refugee camp; Visit to the Citadel of Amman
Saudi Arabia	Jeddah	2 April	Meeting with Crown Prince Mohammed bin Salman
Qatar	Doha	3 April	Meeting with the Emir Tamim bin Hamad Al Thani; Meeting with the prime minister and Foreign Minister of Qatar, Mohammed bin Abdulrahman Al Thani
Poland	Warsaw	11 April	Informal dinner hosted by the president of the European Council, Charles Michel.
Norway	Oslo	12 April	Meeting with the prime minister Jonas Gahr Støre.
Ireland	Dublin	12 April	Meeting with the prime minister Simon Harris.
Slovenia	Ljubljana	16 April	Meeting with the prime minister Robert Golob.
Belgium	Brussels	17-18 April	Participation in the European Council.
Jordan	Dead Sea	11 June	Attendance at the International Conference on the Emergency Humanitarian Response for Gaza
Switzerland	Lucerne	15-16 June	Sánchez travelled to Nidwalden to attend the Global peace summit.
Belgium	Brussels	17-18 June	Participation in the informal summit of the European Union following the European elections
United States	Washington, D.C.	9–11 July	Sánchez travelled to Washington, D.C. to attend the 34th NATO summit.
United Kingdom	Woodstock	18 July	Sánchez attended the 4th EPC Summit.
France	Paris	27-28 July	Attendance at the Paris 2024 Olympic Games
Mauritania	Nouakchott	27 August	Meeting with the president Mohamed Ould Ghazouani
Gambia	Banjul	28 August	Meeting with the president Adama Barrow; Visit to the contingent of the Civil Guard and National Police stationed at the port of Banjul
Senegal	Dakar	28-29 August	Meeting with the president Bassirou Diomaye Faye
France	Paris	4 September	Attendance at the Paris 2024 Paralympic Games
China	Beijing	9-11 September	Meeting with the president Xi Jinping
United States	New York City	23-25 September	Attended the 79th United Nations General Assembly.
Vatican City	Vatican City	11 October	Audience with Pope Francis
Cyprus	Paphos	11 October	Participation in the 11th EuroMed Summit
Belgium	Brussels	16-18 October	Participation in the European Council; Participation in the 1st EU-Gulf Cooperation Council Summit
India	Vadodara and Mumbai	28-29 October	Meeting with the prime minister Narendra Modi
Azerbaijan	Baku	12 November	Sánchez attended the 2024 United Nations Climate Change Conference.
Brazil	Rio de Janeiro	18–19 November	Sánchez attended the 2024 G20 Rio de Janeiro summit
Belgium	Brussels	18–19 December	Participation in the European Council; Participation in the EU-Western Balkans Summit

== 2025 ==
Country	Location(s)	Dates	Details
Switzerland	Davos	22 January	Attendance at the annual meeting of the World Economic Forum.
Belgium	Brussels	3 February	Attended the European Council meeting.
France	Paris	17 February	Sánchez joined an Emergency meeting of European leaders, hosted by President Macron, to respond to President Trump's push for peace negotiations to end the Russo-Ukrainian War.
Ukraine	Kyiv	24 February	Sánchez travelled to Kyiv to mark the third anniversary of the Russian invasion of Ukraine.
United Kingdom	London	2 March	Sánchez travelled to London, United Kingdom to attend the Summit on Ukraine
Belgium	Brussels	6 March	Participate in the extraordinary meeting of the European Council
Finland	Helsinki	12 March	Meeting with the president Alexander Stubb and the prime minister Petteri Orpo
Luxembourg	Luxembourg	12 March	Meeting with Grand Duke Henri, the prime minister Luc Frieden and the president of the European Investment Bank, Nadia Calviño
Belgium	Brussels	20-21 March	Participation in the European Council working session
France	Paris	27 March	Sánchez attended a meeting of the "Coalition of the willing" hosted by President Macron.
Vietnam	Hanoi	9-10 April	Meeting with the General Secretary of the Communist Party of Vietnam, Tô Lâm, the president Lương Cường and the prime minister Phạm Minh Chính
China	Beijing	10-11 April	Meeting with President Xi Jinping and Premier Li Qiang
Albania	Tirana	16 May	Sánchez attended the 6th European Political Community Summit.
Iraq	Baghdad	17 May	Attendance at the XXXIV Summit of the League of Arab States
Turkey	Istanbul	23 May	Meeting with President Recep Tayyip Erdoğan
Belgium	Brussels	28 May	Meeting with the president of the European Commission, Ursula von der Leyen; Meeting with the first vice-president of the European Commission, Teresa Ribera
France	Nice	8–9 June	Attendance at the United Nations Ocean Conference
Netherlands	The Hague	24–25 June	Sánchez attended the 2025 NATO summit.
Belgium	Brussels	26 June	Participation in the European Council
Italy	Rome	10 July	Attended Ukraine Recovery Conference.
Mauritania	Nouakchott	16 July	Participation in the Mauritania-Spain High-Level Meeting
Chile	Santiago	21 July	Attendance at the high-level meeting "Democracy Always"
Uruguay	Montevideo	22 July	Meeting with President Yamandu Orsi
Paraguay	Asunción	23 July	Meeting with President Santiago Peña
United Kingdom	London	3 September	Met with Prime Minister Keir Starmer.
United States	New York City	22-25 September	Attended the 80th United Nations General Assembly.
United Kingdom	London	26 September	Sánchez travelled to London to meet with Prime Minister Keir Starmer. He also attended Global Progress Action Summit.
Denmark	Copenhagen	1–2 October	Sánchez attended the 7th European Political Community Summit.
Egypt	Sharm El Sheikh	13 October	Sánchez attended the Sharm El Sheikh summit which included the signing of the Gaza peace plan to end the Gaza war.
Belgium	Brussels	22–23 October	Attended the 252nd European Council summit.
Brazil	Belém	6–7 November	Sánchez attended the COP30 pre-conference.
Colombia	Santa Marta	8–9 November	Sánchez attended the EU-CELAC summit.
South Africa	Johannesburg	22–23 November	Sánchez attended the 2025 G20 Johannesburg summit.
Angola	Luanda	24–25 November	Attendance at the VII Summit African Union-European Union
Belgium	Brussels	18 December	Participation in the European Council working session.

== 2026 ==
Country	Location(s)	Dates	Details
France	Paris	6 January	Sánchez attended the Coalition of the Willing meeting in Paris with fellow leaders.
Belgium	Brussels	22 January	Attendance at the informal meeting of the European Council.
United Arab Emirates	Dubai	3 February	Assistance to the annual meeting of the World Summit of Governments.
Belgium	Bilzen	12 February	Attendance at the informal meeting of European leaders
Germany	Munich	14 February	Attended the 62nd Munich Security Conference.
India	New Delhi	18-19 February	Meeting with the prime minister Narendra Modi. Attendance at the Global Summit on the Impact of AI
Belgium	Brussels	19-20 March	Participation in the European Council.
China	Beijing	13-15 April	Meeting with President Xi Jinping.
Cyprus	Nicosia	23–24 April	Attendance at the informal meeting of European Union leaders.
Armenia	Yerevan	4 May	Sánchez attended the 8th European Political Community Summit.
Switzerland	Davos	18 May	Address to the 79th World Health Assembly of the WHO.
Vatican City	Vatican City	18 May	Audience with Pope Leo XIV.
Italy	Rome	26 May	Visit to several United Nations agricultural and food institutions.
Montenegro	Tivat	5 June	Attendance at the EU-Western Balkans Summit.
Belgium	Brussels	18–19 June	Attended the European Council.
Turkey	Ankara	7–8 July	Sánchez attended the 2026 Ankara NATO summit.
France	Paris	13 July	Sánchez travelled to Paris to attend a meeting with heads of state and government within the Coalition of the Willing.
United States	New York City	19 July	Sánchez attended the 2026 FIFA World Cup final.
Algeria	Algiers	20 July	Met with President Abdelmadjid Tebboune.
United States	New York City	22 September	Met with Zohran Mamdani and attendance to the Eighty-first session of the United Nations General Assembly.
Croatia	Split	7 October	Attended the 13th EU Med Summit.
Belgium	Brussels	15–16 October	Attended the European Council.

== Future trips ==
Country	Location	Date	Details
United States	Miami	14–15 December	Sanchez is scheduled to attend the G20 summit.

== Multilateral meetings ==
Pedro Sánchez participated in the following summits during his premiership:

Group	Year								
Group	2018	2019	2020	2021	2022	2023	2024	2025	2026
UNGA	24–28 September, (United States) New York City	23–25 September, (United States) New York City	26 September, (videoconference) (United States) New York City	24 September, (United States) New York City	19–22 September, (United States) New York City	19–26 September, (United States) New York City	24–30 September, (United States) New York City	23 September, (United States) New York City	22–25 September, (United States) New York City
G20	30 November – 1 December, (Argentina) Buenos Aires	28–29 June, (Japan) Osaka	21–22 November, (videoconference) (Saudi Arabia) Riyadh	30–31 October, (Italy) Rome	15–16 November, (Indonesia) Bali	8–10 September, (India) New Delhi	18–19 November, (Brazil) Rio de Janeiro	22–23 November, (South Africa) Johannesburg	14–15 December, (United States) Miami
NATO	11–12 July, (Belgium) Brussels	3–4 December, (United Kingdom) Watford	None	14 June, (Belgium) Brussels	24 March, (Belgium) Brussels	11–12 July, (Lithuania) Vilnius	9–11 July, (United States) Washington, D.C.	24–26 June, (Netherlands) The Hague	7–8 July, (Turkey) Ankara
NATO	11–12 July, (Belgium) Brussels	3–4 December, (United Kingdom) Watford	None	14 June, (Belgium) Brussels	June 28–30, (Spain) Madrid	11–12 July, (Lithuania) Vilnius	9–11 July, (United States) Washington, D.C.	24–26 June, (Netherlands) The Hague	7–8 July, (Turkey) Ankara
MED7/9		29 January, (Cyprus) Nicosia	10 September, (France) Porticcio	17 September, (Greece) Athens	9 December, (Spain) Alicante	29 September, (Malta) Mdina	11 October, (Cyprus) Paphos	20 October, (Slovenia) Portorož	7 October, (Croatia) Split
MED7/9		14 June, (Malta) Valletta	10 September, (France) Porticcio	17 September, (Greece) Athens	9 December, (Spain) Alicante	29 September, (Malta) Mdina	11 October, (Cyprus) Paphos	20 October, (Slovenia) Portorož	7 October, (Croatia) Split
EU–CELAC	None					17–18 July, (Belgium) Brussels	None	8–9 November, (Colombia) Santa Marta	None
EPC	Didn't exist				6 October, (Czech Republic) Prague	1 June, (Moldova) Bulboaca	18 July, (United Kingdom) Woodstock	16 May, (Albania) Tirana	4 May, (Armenia) Yerevan
EPC	Didn't exist				6 October, (Czech Republic) Prague	5 October, (Spain) Granada	7 November^{[a]}, (Hungary) Budapest	2 October, (Denmark) Copenhagen	12 November, (Republic of Ireland) Ireland
UNCCC	3 December, (Poland) Katowice	2 December, (Spain) Madrid	None	1–2 November (United Kingdom) Glasgow	7 November (Egypt) Sharm El Sheikh	30 November – 3 December (United Arab Emirates) Dubai	12 November (Azerbaijan) Baku	6–7 November, (Brazil) Belém	November (Turkey) Antalya
Others	None	G7; 25 August, (France) Biarritz	None	None	None	None	Global Peace Summit; 15–16 June, (Switzerland) Lucerne	Securing our future 2 March, (United Kingdom) London	Together for peace and security summit 6 January, (France) Paris
Others	None	G7; 25 August, (France) Biarritz	None	None	None	None	Global Peace Summit; 15–16 June, (Switzerland) Lucerne	15 March, (videoconference); United Kingdom	Determined to act 13 July, (France) Paris
Others	None	G7; 25 August, (France) Biarritz	None	None	None	None	Global Peace Summit; 15–16 June, (Switzerland) Lucerne	Building a robust peace for Ukraine and Europe; 27 March, (France) Paris	Determined to act 13 July, (France) Paris
Others	None	G7; 25 August, (France) Biarritz	None	None	None	None	Global Peace Summit; 15–16 June, (Switzerland) Lucerne	Global Progress Action Summit; 26 September, (United Kingdom) London	Determined to act 13 July, (France) Paris
██ = Future event ██ = Did not attend / participate.^aWithdrew due to the 2024 Spanish floods
