= List of international prime ministerial trips made by Kyriakos Mitsotakis =

This is a list of international trips made by Kyriakos Mitsotakis, the current Prime Minister of Greece.

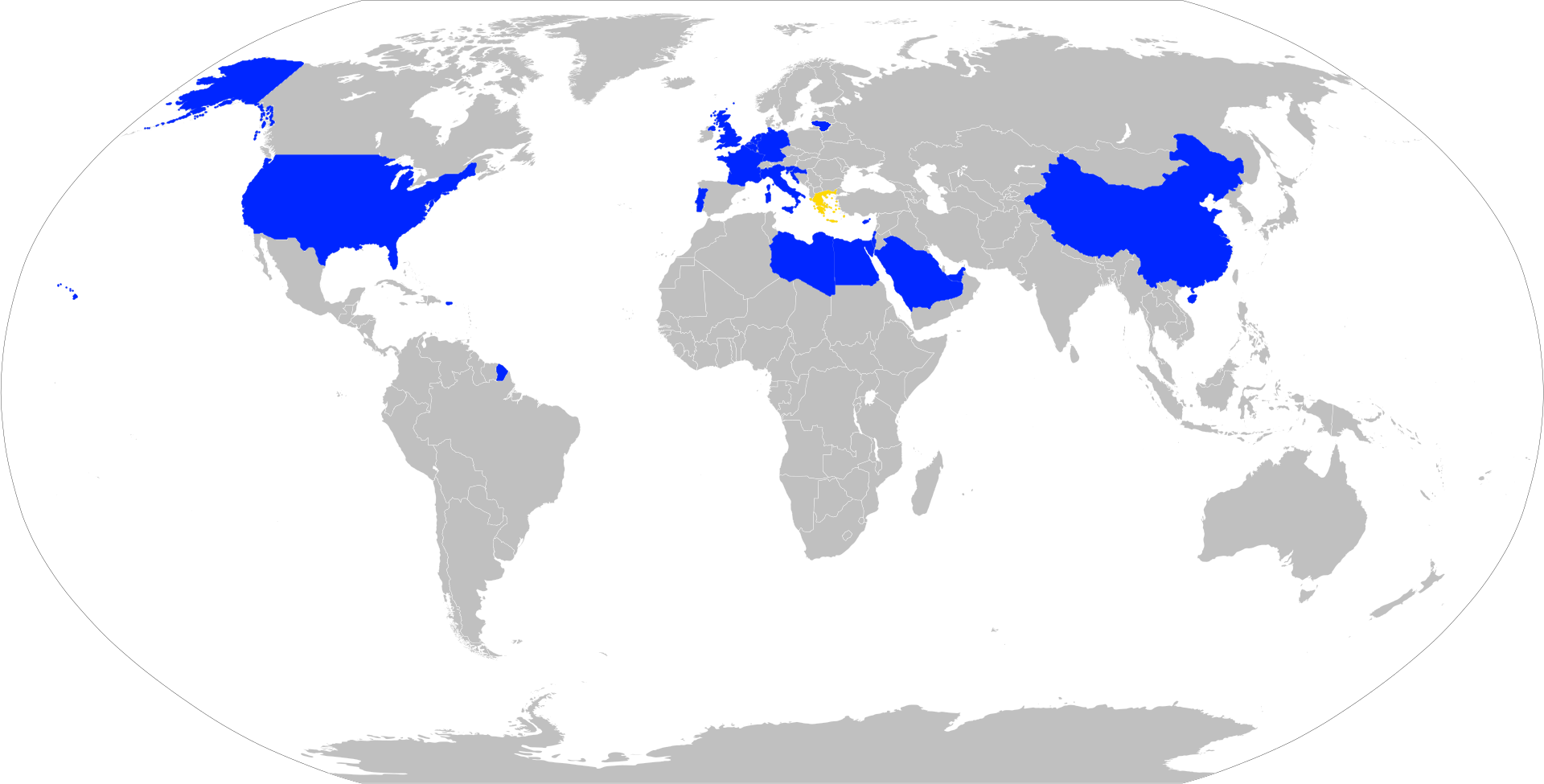
World map highlighting countries visited by Kyriakos Mitsotakis.

== Summary of international trips ==
=== 2019 ===
Mitsotakis' trips in 2019:

Country	Areas visited	Date(s)	Details
Cyprus	Nicosia	29–30 July	Met with President Nicos Anastasiades. First trip since his inauguration.
France	Paris	22 August	Met with President Emmanuel Macron.
Germany	Berlin	29 August	Met with Chancellor Angela Merkel.
Netherlands	Hague	2–3 September	Met with Prime Minister Mark Rutte.
USA	New York City	23–26 September	Visit during the United Nations general assemble meeting. Met with Donald Trump, António Guterres and Edi Rama.
Egypt	Cairo	8 October	Visit during the summit between Egypt- Greece– Cyprus.
China	Shanghai	4 November	Met with President Xi Jinping.
Croatia	Zagreb	21 November	Met with Prime Minister Andrej Plenković.
Italy	Rome	26–27 November	Met with Prime Minister Giuseppe Conte.
UK	London	3–4 December	Joined the 70th anniversary of NATO's creation.
Belgium	Brussels	12–13 December	Joined the EU summit.

=== 2020 ===
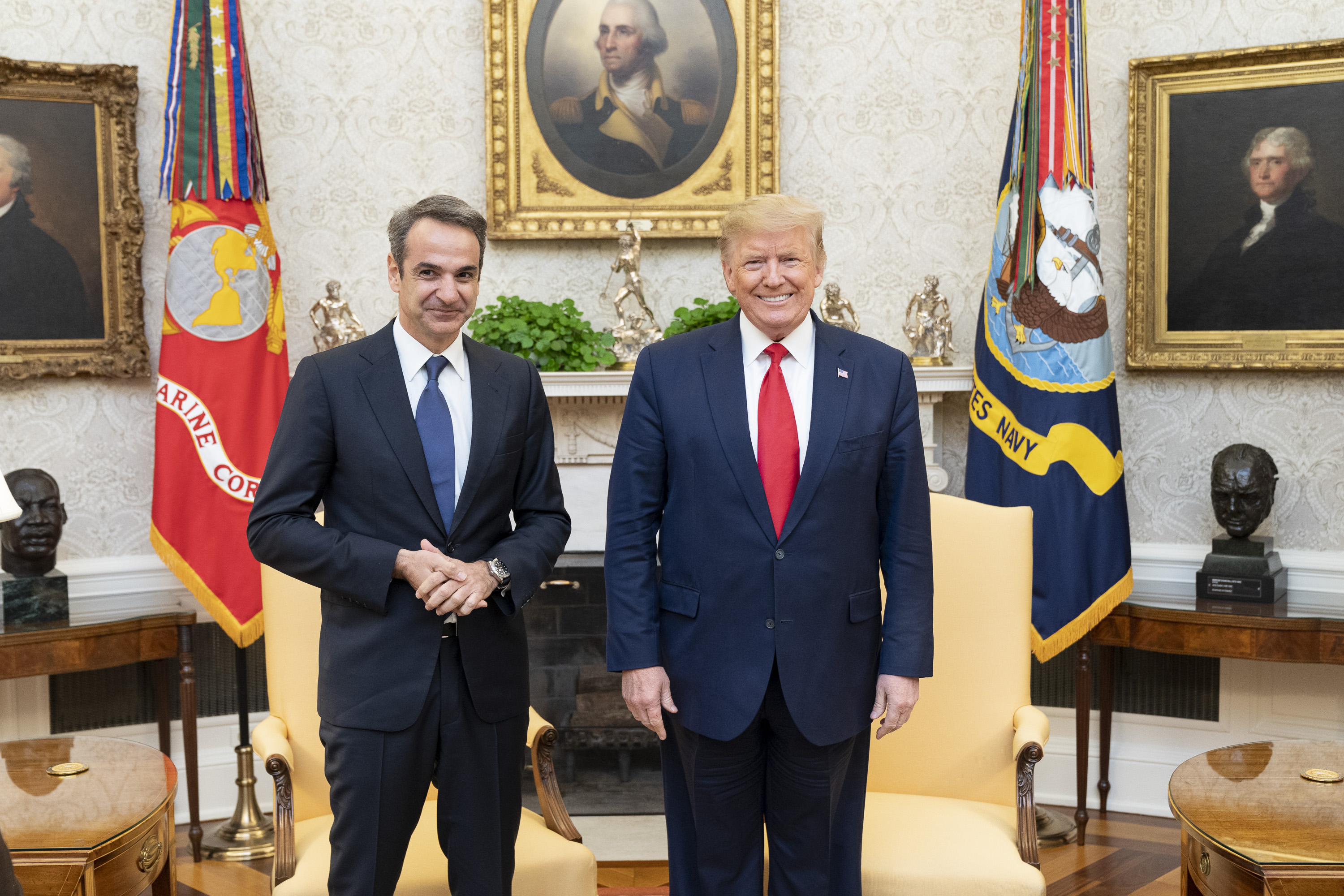
Kyriakos Mitsotakis with Donald Trump inside the White House.

Mitsotakis' trips in 2020:

Country	Areas visited	Date(s)	Details
USA	Washington, D.C.	7–8 January	Met with President Donald Trump. Also, had meetings with Vice President Mike Pence and Speaker of the House Nancy Pelosi.
France	Paris	29 January	Met with President Emmanuel Macron.
Belgium	Brussels	29 January	Met with the President of the European Council Charles Michel.
Saudi Arabia	Riyadh	2–3 February	Met with Crown Prince Mohammed bin Salman.
UAE	Abu Dhabi	3–4 February	Met with Crown Prince of Abu Dhabi Mohammed bin Zayed Al Nahyan.
Belgium	Brussels	20 February	Joined the EU emergency summit.
Israel	Tel Aviv	16–17 July	Met with Prime Minister Benjamin Netanyahu.
Belgium	Brussels	20-21 August	Joined the EU summit.
Belgium	Brussels	1–2 October	Joined the EU summit.
Belgium	Brussels	15–16 October	Joined the EU summit.
UAE	Abu Dhabi	17–18 November	Met with Crown Prince of Abu Dhabi Mohammed bin Zayed Al Nahyan.
Belgium	Brussels	10–11 December	Joined the EU summit.

=== 2021 ===
Mitsotakis' trips in 2021:

Country	Areas visited	Date(s)	Details
Portugal	Lisbon	11 January	Met with Prime Minister António Costa.
Cyprus	Nicosia	8 February	Met with President Nicos Anastasiades.
Israel	Tel Aviv	8 February	Met with Prime Minister Benjamin Netanyahu.
Libya	Tripoli	6 April	Met with Prime Minister Abdul Hamid Dbeibeh and Chairman of the Presidential Council Mohamed al-Menfi. Also met with the Italian Prime Minister Mario Draghi, who also was in the country on a separate visit.
Portugal	Porto	7–8 May	Joined the unofficial EU summit.
Belgium	Brussels	24 May	Joined the EU summit.
Belgium	Brussels	14 June	Joined the NATO summit. Had meetings with Boris Johnson, Edi Rama and Recep Tayyip Erdoğan.
Egypt	Cairo	21 June	Met with President Abdel Fattah el-Sisi.
Belgium	Brussels	24–25 June	Joined the EU summit.
Slovenia	Bled	1–2 September	Met with President Borut Pahor and Prime Minister Janez Janša.
USA	New York City	22–23 September	Joined the UN summit.
France	Paris	28 September	Met with President Emmanuel Macron.
Slovenia	Brdo Castle near Kranj	6 October	Joined the special summit between the EU – Western Balkans.
Belgium	Brussels	21–22 October	Joined the EU summit.
Saudi Arabia	Riyadh	25–26 October	Met with Crown Prince Mohammed bin Salman.
UK	Glasgow	1–2 November	Joined the special UN special about the climate.
France	Paris	12 November	Joined the special summit about the situation in Libya.
UK	London	16–17 November	Met with Prime Minister Boris Johnson.
Israel	Tel Aviv	7 December	Joined the Greece-Israel-Cyprus summit.
Russia	Sochi	8 December	Met with President Vladimir Putin.
Belgium	Brussels	15–16 December	Joined the EU summit.
Bulgaria	Sofia	20-21 December	Met with President Rumen Radev and Prime Minister Kiril Petkov.

=== 2022 ===
Mitsotakis' trips in 2022:

Country	Areas visited	Date(s)	Details
France	Strasbourg	11 January	Attended the memorial ceremony for the President of the European Parliament David Sassoli.
Croatia	Zagreb	10 February	Met with Prime Minister Andrej Plenković.
Belgium	Brussels	16–17 February	Attended the sixth European Union-African Union summit. Met with Serbian President Aleksandar Vučić, and Rwandan President Paul Kagame.
Germany	Munich	18–19 February	Joined the 58th Munich Security Conference. Met with American Vice President Kamala Harris.
Romania	Bucharest	23 February	Met with President Klaus Iohannis and Prime Minister Nicolae Ciucă.
Belgium	Brussels	24 February	Joined the emegercy meeting of the European Council.
Belgium	Brussels	24 March	Mitsotakis attended an extraordinary NATO summit.
United Arab Emirates	Abu Dhabi	9 May	Met with President Mohamed bin Zayed Al Nahyan.
USA	Washington, D.C.	15–17 May	Met with President Joe Biden. Also, had meetings with Vice President Kamala Harris, and Speaker of the House Nancy Pelosi
USA	Boston	23 May	Addressed the Boston College Class of 2022 at the university's 146th Commencement Exercises.
Spain	Madrid	28–30 June	Mitsotakis attended the NATO summit.
Czech Republic	Prague	6 October	Mitsotakis travelled to Prague to attend the inaugural meeting of the European Political Community.
Lithuania	Vilnius	31 October	Met with President Gitanas Nausėda and Prime Minister Ingrida Šimonytė.
Albania	Tirana	6 December	Attended the EU-Western Balkans summit.
Albania	Himare	22 December	Visited the ethnic Greek minority in Albania.

=== 2023 ===
Mitsotakis' trips in 2023:

Country	Areas visited	Date(s)	Details
Germany	Munich	17–19 February	Attended the 59th Munich Security Conference.
Belgium	Brussels	29 June	Attended European People's Party summit. Met with President of the European Commission Ursula von der Leyen.
Latvia	Riga	10 July	Mitsotakis met with Latvian prime minister Krišjānis Kariņš.
Lithuania	Vilnius	11–12 July	Mitsotakis attended the NATO summit.
Spain	Granada	5 October	Mitsotakis attended the 3rd European Political Community Summit.
Albania	Tirana	16 October	Attended Western Balkans Summit.
Germany	Berlin	13–14 November	Mitsotakis began his working visit by participating in a discussion with Friedrich Merz at the Konrad Adenauer Foundation, where they exchanged views on European competitiveness, energy security, digital transformation, migration, and Greek–Turkish relations. Later, Mitsotakis met with Chancellor Olaf Scholz and President of the European Council Charles Michel during a Strategic Agenda consultation at the German Chancellery. The meeting was also attended by Austrian chancellor Karl Nehammer, Belgian prime minister Alexander De Croo, President of Cyprus Nikos Christodoulides, Hungarian prime minister Viktor Orbán, and President of Lithuania Gitanas Nausėda. The leaders discussed priorities for the European Union's next institutional cycle, including security and defence, competitiveness, energy, migration, enlargement, and institutional reforms. He met with German chancellor Olaf Scholz at the German Chancellery. The leaders discussed Greek–German relations, migration, energy, the economy, and regional and international developments before holding a joint press conference.
Netherlands	The Hague	8 December	
Belgium	Brussels	13–15 December	Mitsotakis attended the EU-Western Balkans summit followed by the European Council.

=== 2024 ===
Mitsotakis' trips in 2024:

Country	Areas visited	Date(s)	Details
India	New Delhi, Mumbai	21–22 February	He was the chief guest and keynote speaker at the 2024 Raisina Dialogue. This was the first Head of State or Government-level visit from Greece to India in 15 years.
Ukraine	Odesa	6 March	Met with President Volodymyr Zelenskyy.
Egypt	Cairo	17 March	
Canada	Montreal, Toronto	24–25 March	Met with Canadian prime minister Justin Trudeau, took part in the Greek Independence Day Parade, visited the Greek Canadian community and church events. There were a number of meetings with Canadian investors, representatives of banks, agencies, logistics and other companies.
Poland	Warsaw	11 April	Mitsotakis met with Polish prime minister Donald Tusk, President of the European Council Charles Michel, Estonian prime minister Kaja Kallas, Finnish prime minister Petteri Orpo, Tánaiste Micheál Martin, Luxembourgish prime minister Luc Frieden and Spanish prime minister Pedro Sánchez in Warsaw, with the aim of preparing a vision of the European Union's priorities for the next five years. The draft Action Plan was to be approved at the European Council in June.
Belgium	Brussels	17 June	Mitsotakis attended an informal European Council summit.
United States	Washington D.C.	9–11 July	Mitsotakis attended the NATO summit
United Kingdom	Woodstock	18 July	Mitsotakis attended the 4th European Political Community Summit.
France	Paris	26 July	Mitsotakis travelled to Paris to attend the 2024 Summer Olympics opening ceremony.
Croatia	Dubrovnik	9 October	Addressed the third Ukraine-South East Europe summit.
Hungary	Budapest	7 November	Mitsotakis attended the 5th European Political Community Summit.
United Kingdom	London	3 December	Met with Prime Minister Keir Starmer.
Finland	Region of Lapland	21–22 December	Mitsotakis travelled to northern Finland on the invitation of Finnish Prime Minister Petteri Orpo. He attended an informal meeting with Orpo, Swedish Prime Minister Ulf Kristersson, Italian Prime Minister Giorgia Meloni and the High Representative of the Union for Foreign Affairs and Security Policy Kaja Kallas.

=== 2025 ===
Mitsotakis' trips in 2025:

Country	Areas visited	Date(s)	Details
Germany	Berlin	17–18 January	Attended the EPP Leaders’ Retreat. He also met with leader of the opposition and leader of the Christian Democratic Union, Friedrich Merz.
Belgium	Brussels	3 February	Mitsotakis attended an informal European Council summit.
Belgium	Brussels	20–21 March	Mitsotakis attended a European Council summit.
France	Paris	27 March	Mitsotakis attended a meeting of the "Coalition of the willing" hosted by President Macron.
Israel	Jerusalem	30 March	Mitsotakis met with Israeli prime minister Benjamin Netanyahu. The two "reaffirmed the strategic relationship between Greece and Israel" and discussed "the further deepening of bilateral cooperation, particularly in the field of defense." The meeting sparked controversy, as Netanyahu was wanted by the International Criminal Court for alleged war crimes in the Gaza war.
Vatican City	Vatican City	26 April	Mitsotakis is expected to attend the funeral of Pope Francis.
Poland	Warsaw	28-29 April	Mitsotakis participated in the Three Seas Initiative Summit.
Germany	Berlin	13 May	Met with Chancellor Friedrich Merz.
Ukraine	Odesa	11 June	Attended the fourth Ukraine-South East Europe summit.
Netherlands	The Hague	23–25 June	Mitsotakis attended the 2025 NATO summit.
Belgium	Brussels	26–27 June	Mitsotakis attended the European Council meeting.
United States	New York City	26 September	Attended the General debate of the eightieth session of the United Nations General Assembly. Met with President of Syria Ahmed al-Sharaa.
Denmark	Copenhagen	2 October	Attended the 7th European Political Community Summit.
Egypt	Sharm El Sheikh	13 October	Mitsotakis attended the Sharm El Sheikh summit which included the signing of the Gaza peace plan to end the Gaza war.
Slovenia	Portoroz	20 October	Mitsotakis attended the Med9 summit hosted by Prime Minister Robert Golob.

=== 2026 ===
Country	Location(s)	Dates	Details
France	Paris	6 January	Mitsotakis attended the Coalition of the Willing meeting in Paris with fellow leaders.
Croatia	Zagreb	30–31 January	Attended the EPP Leaders’ Retreat.
Italy	Milan	6 February	Attended the 2026 Winter Olympics.
Belgium	Antwerp, Rijkhoven	11–12 February	Mitsotakis attended the 3rd European Industry Summit. Next day participated in the informal meeting of EU heads of state and government.
India	New Delhi	17–20 February	Attended AI Impact Summit.
Belgium	Brussels	19–20 March	Mitsotakis attended the European Council.
Cyprus	Nicosia	23–24 April	Mitsotakis attended an informal meeting of the European Council summit.
Belgium	Brussels	18–19 June	Attended the European Council.
Turkey	Ankara	7–8 July	Mitsotakis attended the 2026 Ankara NATO summit.
France	Paris	13—14 July	Mitsotakis travelled to Paris to attend a meeting with heads of state and government within the Coalition of the Willing. Mitsotakis attended Bastille Day celebrations.
United States	New York City	21-25 September	Mitsotakis is attended the 81th United Nations General Assembly.
Belgium	Brussels	15–16 October	Mitsotakis attended the European Council.

== Future trips ==
Country	Areas visited	Date(s)	Details
Croatia	Split	7 October	Mitsotakis is scheduled to attend the 13th EU Med Summit.
Hungary	Budapest	22-23 October	Mitsotakis is expected to attend the 70th Anniversary Commemoration Ceremony Hungarian Revolution of 1956.
Ireland	Dublin	12 November	Mitsotakis is scheduled to attend the 9th European Political Community Summit.
Cambodia	Phnom Penh	15–16 November	Mitsotakis is scheduled to attend the 20th Organisation internationale de la Francophonie summit.
Turkey	Antalya	November	Mitsotakis is scheduled to attend the 2026 United Nations Climate Change Conference.

== Multilateral meetings ==
Kyriakos Mitsotakis participated in the following summits during his premiership:

Group	Year							
Group	2019	2020	2021	2022	2023	2024	2025	2026
UNGA	23–26 September, (United States) New York City	26 September, (videoconference) (United States) New York City	22–23 September, (United States) New York City	20-26 September, (United States) New York City	19-26 September, (United States) New York City	24-30 September, (United States) New York City	26 September, (United States) New York City	21–25 September, (United States) New York City
NATO	3–4 December, (United Kingdom) Watford	None	14 June, (Belgium) Brussels	24 March, (Belgium) Brussels	11–12 July, (Lithuania) Vilnius	9–11 July, (United States) Washington, D.C.	24–26 June, (Netherlands) The Hague	7–8 July, (Turkey) Ankara
NATO	3–4 December, (United Kingdom) Watford	None	14 June, (Belgium) Brussels	28–30 June, (Spain) Madrid	11–12 July, (Lithuania) Vilnius	9–11 July, (United States) Washington, D.C.	24–26 June, (Netherlands) The Hague	7–8 July, (Turkey) Ankara
MED7/9		10 September, (France) Porticcio	17 September, (Greece) Athens	9 December, (Spain) Alicante	29 September, (Malta) Mdina	11 October, (Cyprus) Paphos	20 October, (Slovenia) Portorož	7 October, (Croatia) Split
EPC	Didn't exist			6 October, (Czech Republic) Prague	Wasn't prime minister during 1 June	18 July, (United Kingdom) Woodstock	16 May, (Albania) Tirana	4 May, (Armenia) Yerevan
EPC	Didn't exist			6 October, (Czech Republic) Prague	5 October, (Spain) Granada	7 November, (Hungary) Budapest	2 October, (Denmark) Copenhagen	12 November, (Republic of Ireland) Dublin
Others	None	None	None	None	None	Global Peace Summit; 15–16 June, (Switzerland) Lucerne	15 March, (videoconference); United Kingdom	Together for peace and security summit 6 January, (France) Paris
Others	None	None	None	None	None	Global Peace Summit; 15–16 June, (Switzerland) Lucerne	Building a robust peace for Ukraine and Europe; 27 March, (France) Paris	Determined to act 13 July, (France) Paris
██ = Future event ██ = Did not attend / participate.
