= List of international presidential trips made by Egils Levits =

During his time in office (July 2019-2023), Egils Levits made numerous international trips in his capacity as the president of Latvia.

== Number of trips to each country ==
- One: Austria, Azerbaijan, Bulgaria, Denmark, Finland, Iceland, Japan, Lithuania, Poland, Slovakia, Spain and Switzerland
- Two: Estonia, Germany and Sweden
- Three: Belgium, the United Kingdom and the United States
- Four: Ukraine

== 2019 ==
Country	Areas visited	Dates	Details	Image
Estonia	Tallinn	10 July	First official visit. Met with President Kersti Kaljulaid and Prime Minister Jüri Ratas.	
Finland	Helsinki	28 August	Working visit. Discussion of bilateral relations with President Sauli Niinistö.	
United States	New York City	22–26 September	Attended General debate of the seventy-fourth session of the United Nations General Assembly	
Japan	Tokyo	21–24 October	Enthronement of Japanese Emperor Naruhito	
Belgium	Brussels	25 November	Visit to NATO Headquarters; meeting with Secretary General Jens Stoltenberg.	
United Kingdom	London	3–4 December	See 2019 London summit	

== 2020 ==
Country	Areas visited	Dates	Details	Image
Switzerland	Geneva	20 January	Visit to the European Organization for Nuclear Research (CERN).	

== 2021 ==
Country	Areas visited	Dates	Details	Image
Belgium	Brussels	13–14 June	Levits travelled to Brussels to attend the 31st NATO summit.	
Sweden	Stockholm	20-22 June	Met with King Carl XVI Gustav of Sweden, country’s officials, business owners, higher education, science and culture representatives. Official visit to mark the 100th anniversary of diplomatic relations and the 30th anniversary of the restoration of Latvia's independence.	
Austria	Vienna	30 June–2 July	Participation in the "Austrian World Summit 2021"; meeting with President Alexander Van der Bellen.	
Bulgaria	Sofia	8–9 July	Attended Three Seas Initiative summit.	
Ukraine	Kyiv	23–24 August	Attended Crimea Platform and Kyiv Independence Day Parade	
United States	New York City	20–23 September	Attended General debate of the seventy-sixth session of the United Nations General Assembly.	
Denmark	Copenhagen	12-13 October		
Sweden	Malmö	13 October	Attended the Malmö International Forum on Holocaust Remembrance and Combating Antisemitism.	
Estonia	Tartu	5 November	Meeting with new Estonian President Alar Karis	
Lithuania	Vilnius	15 November	Met with Estonian President Alar Karis and Lithuanian President Gitanas Nausėda.	

== 2022 ==
Country	Areas visited	Dates	Details	Image
Germany	Munich	19 February	Attended the Munich Security Conference. Also met with Chancellor Olaf Scholz, Estonian Prime Minister Kaja Kallas, British Prime Minister Boris Johnson and Ukrainian President Volodymyr Zelenskyy.	
Belgium	Brussels	23-24 March	Levits travelled to Brussels to attend the extraordinary NATO summit to discuss the Russian invasion of Ukraine.	
Ukraine	Kyiv	13 April	Met with Ukrainian President Volodymyr Zelenskyy, Polish President Andrzej Duda, Lithuanian President Gitanas Nausėda, Estonian President Alar Karis	
Romania	Bucharest	10 June	Attended Bucharest Nine Summit.	
Spain	Madrid	28–30 June	Attendance to the 32nd NATO summit.	
Ukraine	Kyiv	9 September	Met with the Ukrainian President Volodymyr Zelenskyy and Polish Prime Minister Mateusz Morawiecki	
United Kingdom	London	18–19 September	Attendance to the state funeral of Elizabeth II	
United States	New York City	20-26 September	Attended General debate of the seventy-seventh session of the United Nations General Assembly	

== 2023 ==
Country	Areas visited	Dates	Details	Image
Germany	Munich	17–18 February	Meeting of the Munich Security Conference, talks with President Emmanuel Macron, President Gitanas Nausėda and Prime Minister Kaja Kallas	
Poland	Warsaw	23 February	Extraordinary Summit of the Bucharest Nine due to the Ukraine conflict, talks with President Joe Biden	
Ukraine	Lviv	3 March		
Azerbaijan	Baku	8–9 March	Official visit; meetings with President Ilham Aliyev; participation in the opening of the 10th Baku Global Forum.	
Portugal	Lisbon	11–14 April	State visit; meetings with Portuguese President Marcelo Rebelo de Sousa and other officials; signing of memorandums of cooperation in science and culture.	
United Kingdom	London	6–7 May	Attendance to the Coronation of King Charles III	
Iceland	Reykjavík	16–17 May	Levits attended the 4th Council of Europe summit.	
Slovakia	Bratislava	6–7 June	Meeting with NATO leaders and talks with Secretary-General Jens Stoltenberg. Attended Bucharest Nine Summit.	

== Multilateral meetings ==
Multilateral meetings of the following intergovernmental organizations took place during Egils Levits's presidency (2019–2023).

Group	Year				
Group	2019	2020	2021	2022	2023
UNGA	23–25 September, (United States) New York City	26 September, (videoconference) (United States) New York City	20–23 September, (United States) New York City	20-26 September, (United States) New York City	
NATO	3–4 December, (United Kingdom) Watford	None	14 June, (Belgium) Brussels	24 March, (Belgium) Brussels	
NATO	3–4 December, (United Kingdom) Watford	None	14 June, (Belgium) Brussels	June 28–30, (Spain) Madrid	
Bucharest Nine		None	10 May, (Romania) Bucharest	25 February, (Poland) Warsaw	22 February, (Poland) Warsaw
Bucharest Nine		None	10 May, (Romania) Bucharest	10 June, (Romania) Bucharest	6 June, (Slovakia) Bratislava
Three Seas Initiative		19 October, (videoconference) (Estonia) Tallinn	8–9 July, (Bulgaria) Sofia	20–21 June, (Latvia) Riga	
Others	None				Coronation of King Charles III and Queen Camilla; 5–6 May, (United Kingdom) London
