= List of international prime ministerial trips made by Sophie Wilmès =

This is a list of international prime ministerial trips made by Sophie Wilmès, who served as the Prime Minister of Belgium from 27 October 2019 to 1 October 2020.

Due to the COVID-19 pandemic, Sophie Wilmès made no international trips from March 2020 until the end of her term as Prime Minister in October 2020. Major events, including the 75th UN General Assembly, were held virtually, and she focused on managing the domestic crisis after receiving emergency powers in March 2020.

== Summary ==
Wilmès has visited four countries during her tenure as prime minister. The number of visits per country where Wilmès has traveled are:

- One visit to France, the Democratic Republic of the Congo, Switzerland and the United Kingdom

== 2019 ==
Country	Location(s)	Dates	Details
France	Paris	11 November	Attended Paris Peace Forum. She will then attend a dinner hosted at the Élysée Palace by President Emmanuel Macron for some thirty heads of state and government. She took part in discussions on multilateral cooperation, global governance, and international security. The visit included meetings with other world leaders and participation in sessions addressing global challenges and the strengthening of international partnerships.
United Kingdom	London, Watford	3–4 December	Wilmès attended the 30th NATO summit.

== 2020 ==
Country	Location(s)	Dates	Details
Switzerland	Davos	21-23 January	Attended World Economic Forum.
DR Congo	Kinshasa	February	An official visit to normalize bilateral relations. A meeting with President Félix Tshisekedi. The first visit by a Belgian prime minister to the DRC in 10 years.

== Multilateral meetings ==
Sophie Wilmès participated in the following summits during her premiership:

Group	Year	
Group	2019	2020
UNGA		26 September, (videoconference) (United States) New York City
NATO	3–4 December, (United Kingdom) Watford	none
