= 2022 NATO summit =

2022 NATO summit may refer to:

- 2022 virtual extraordinary NATO summit (25 February)
- 2022 Brussels extraordinary NATO summit (24 March)
- 2022 Madrid NATO summit (28–30 June)
