= 2022 virtual extraordinary NATO summit =

2022 NATO extraordinary summit meeting conducted virtually

NATO Extraordinary Summit Virtual 2022 2022 NATO virtual summit
- Host country: Virtual Summit
- Date: 25 February 2022
- Follows: 2021 Brussels summit
- Precedes: 2022 Brussels extraordinary summit
- Website: www.nato.int

The 2022 NATO virtual summit was a meeting of the heads of state and heads of government of NATO held virtually, on 25 February 2022. The meeting took place at the request of the Latvian and Estonian governments, following the Russian invasion of Ukraine, which had begun a day earlier. The request was pursuant to Article 4 of the North Atlantic Treaty, which requires consultations when "the territorial integrity, political independence or security of any of the parties is threatened."

At the summit, Secretary General Jens Stoltenberg announced that the alliance would be deploying extra land, sea and air units to member states in Eastern Europe from the NATO Response Force. This was the first time the response force had been deployed for collective defence.

== Leaders of Member States participating in the videoconference ==
- Albania – Prime Minister Edi Rama
- Belgium – Prime Minister Alexander De Croo
- Bulgaria – President Rumen Radev
- Canada – Prime Minister Justin Trudeau
- Croatia – President Zoran Milanović
- Czech Republic – Prime Minister Petr Fiala
- Denmark – Prime Minister Mette Frederiksen
- Estonia – Prime Minister Kaja Kallas
- France – President Emmanuel Macron
- Germany – Chancellor Olaf Scholz
- Greece – Prime Minister Kyriakos Mitsotakis
- Hungary – Prime Minister Viktor Orbán
- Iceland – Prime Minister Katrín Jakobsdóttir
- Italy – Prime Minister Mario Draghi
- Latvia – President Egils Levits
- Lithuania – President Gitanas Nausėda
- Luxembourg – Prime Minister Xavier Bettel
- Montenegro – President Milo Đukanović
- Netherlands – Prime Minister Mark Rutte
- North Macedonia – Prime Minister Dimitar Kovačevski
- Norway – Prime Minister Jonas Gahr Støre
- Poland – President Andrzej Duda
- Portugal – Prime Minister António Costa
- Romania – President Klaus Iohannis
- Slovakia – President Zuzana Čaputová
- Slovenia – Prime Minister Janez Janša
- Spain – Prime Minister Pedro Sánchez
- Turkey – President Recep Tayyip Erdoğan
- United Kingdom – Prime Minister Boris Johnson
- United States – President Joe Biden
- NATO – Secretary General Jens Stoltenberg
