= 2021 Brussels NATO summit =

2021 NATO summit meeting in Brussels, Belgium

NATO Summit Brussels 2021 2021 Brussels Summit
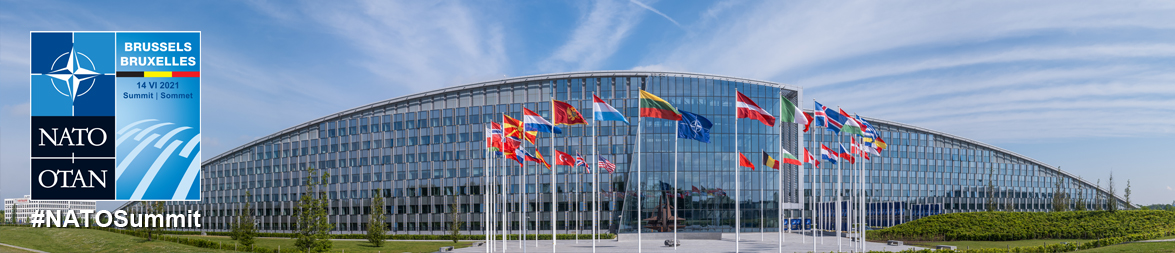
- Host country: Belgium
- Date: 14 June 2021
- Cities: Brussels
- Venues: NATO Headquarters in Brussels, Belgium
- Follows: 2019 London summit
- Precedes: 2022 NATO virtual summit

The 2021 Brussels summit of the North Atlantic Treaty Organization (NATO) was the formal meeting of the heads of state and heads of government of the North Atlantic Treaty Organization, held in Brussels, Belgium, on 14 June 2021.

It was the first time that North Macedonia attended the NATO Summit since joining NATO in 2020.

== Member states leaders and other dignitaries in attendance ==
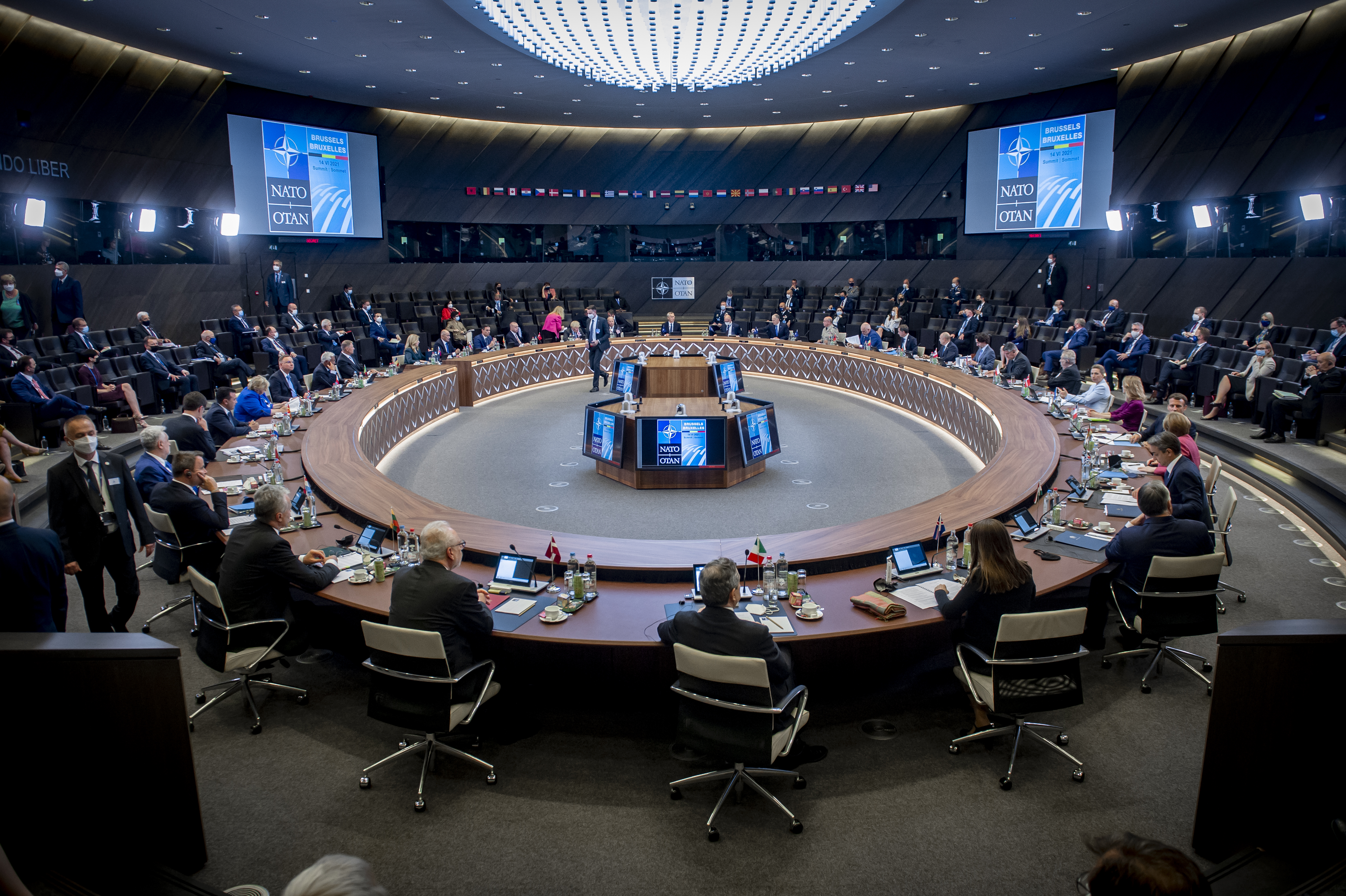
Participants at the summit

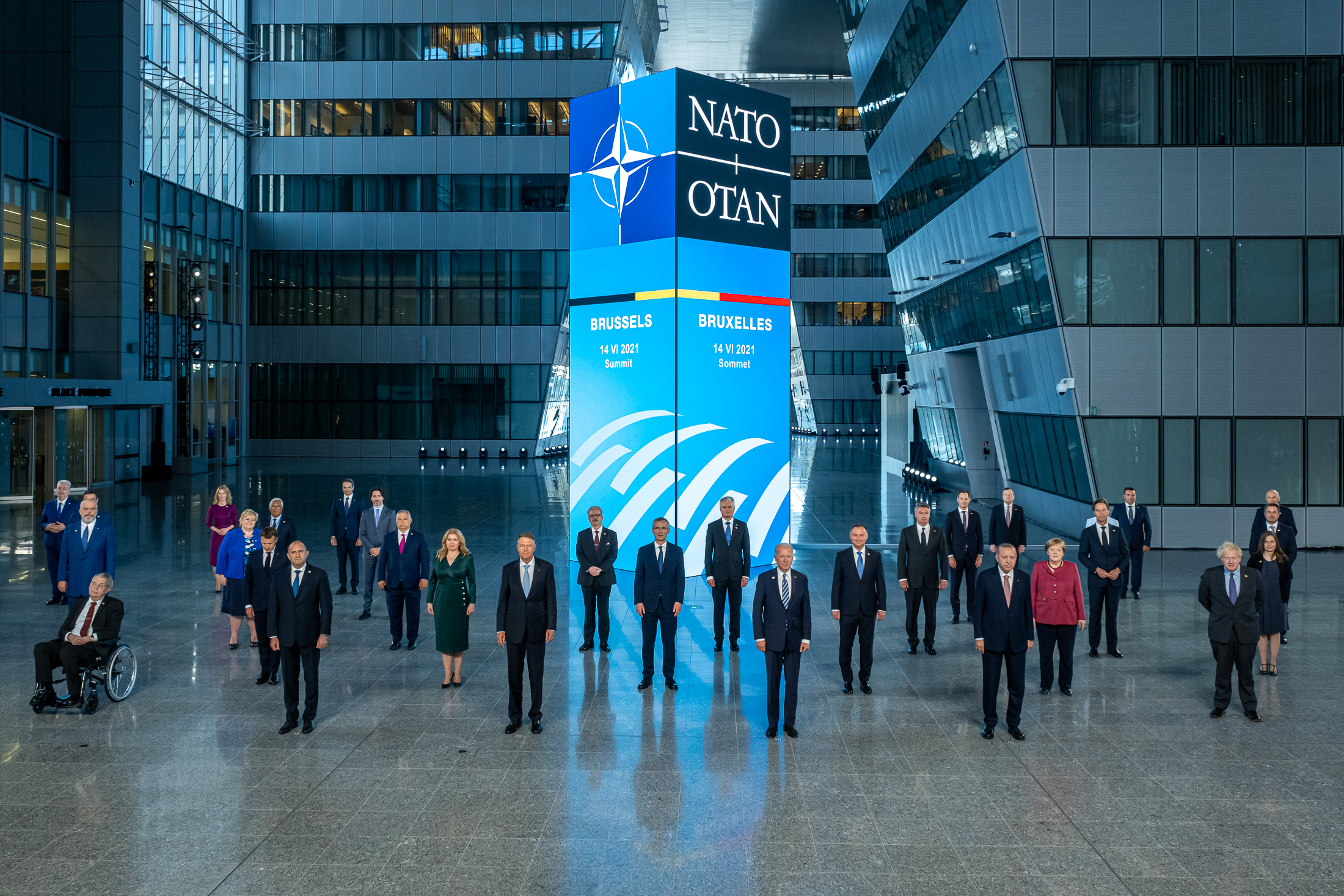
NATO leaders at the summit

- Albania – Prime Minister Edi Rama
- Belgium – Prime Minister Alexander De Croo
- Bulgaria – President Rumen Radev
- Canada – Prime Minister Justin Trudeau
- Croatia – President Zoran Milanović
- Czech Republic – President Miloš Zeman
- Denmark – Prime Minister Mette Frederiksen
- Estonia – Prime Minister Kaja Kallas
- France – President Emmanuel Macron
- Germany – Chancellor Angela Merkel
- Greece – Prime Minister Kyriakos Mitsotakis
- Hungary – Prime Minister Viktor Orbán
- Iceland – Prime Minister Katrín Jakobsdóttir
- Italy – Prime Minister Mario Draghi
- Latvia – President Egils Levits
- Lithuania – President Gitanas Nausėda
- Luxembourg – Prime Minister Xavier Bettel
- Montenegro – Prime Minister Zdravko Krivokapić
- Netherlands – Prime Minister Mark Rutte
- North Macedonia – Prime Minister Zoran Zaev
- Norway – Prime Minister Erna Solberg
- Poland – President Andrzej Duda
- Portugal – Prime Minister António Costa
- Romania – President Klaus Iohannis
- Slovakia – President Zuzana Čaputová
- Slovenia – Prime Minister Janez Janša
- Spain – Prime Minister Pedro Sánchez
- Turkey – President Recep Tayyip Erdoğan
- United Kingdom – Prime Minister Boris Johnson
- United States – President Joe Biden
- NATO – Secretary General Jens Stoltenberg

== See also ==
- 47th G7 summit
