= 2022 Brussels extraordinary NATO summit =

2022 NATO extraordinary summit meeting in Belgium

NATO Extraordinary Summit Brussels 2022 2022 Brussels Extraordinary Summit
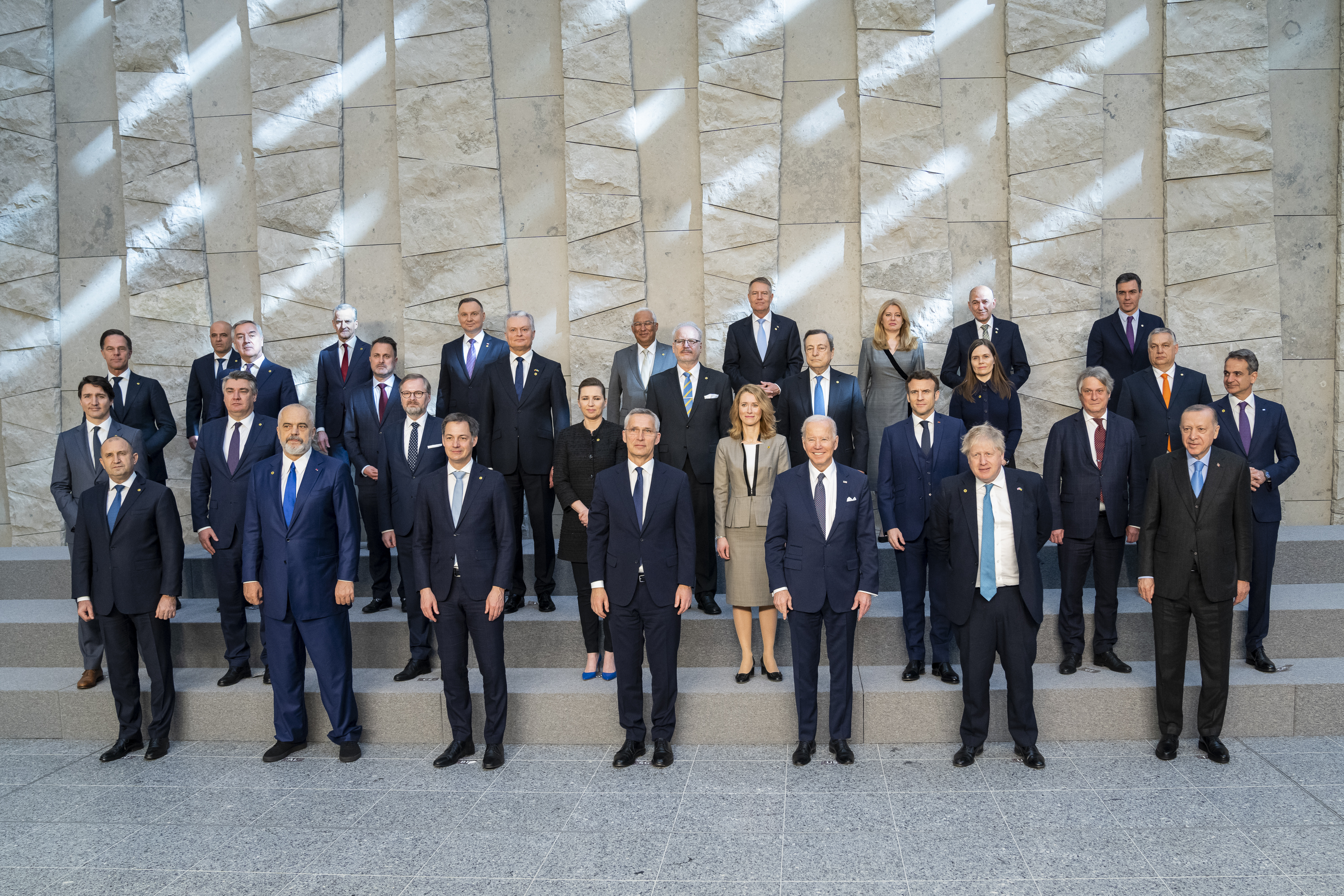
- Leaders of nations privy to NATO pose for photo before discussions in March 2022
- Host country: Belgium
- Date: 24 March 2022
- Cities: Brussels
- Venues: NATO Headquarters
- Follows: 2022 NATO virtual summit
- Precedes: 2022 Madrid summit
- Website: www.nato.int

The 2022 Brussels summit was a meeting of the heads of state and heads of government of NATO held in Brussels, Belgium, on 24 March 2022. The meeting took place in the wake of the Russian invasion of Ukraine.

On the day, NATO hosted meetings of G7 leaders. Ukraine President Volodymyr Zelenskyy attended by video conference and addressed the summit. Zelenskyy requested NATO states provide Ukraine with military equipment including aircraft, tanks, and armoured vehicles. He also called for NATO to establish a no-fly zone to prevent air and missile attacks in Ukraine. At the summit, some NATO states pledged to increase military spending.

At the summit, leaders also agreed to extend the term of Secretary General Jens Stoltenberg for another year until September 2023.

Following the summit, the leaders released a joint statement condemning Russian attacks on civilians and calling on Russia to immediately suspend military operations in Ukraine as had been ordered by the International Court of Justice a week earlier.

== Member states leaders and other dignitaries in attendance ==
- Albania – Prime Minister Edi Rama
- Belgium – Prime Minister Alexander De Croo
- Bulgaria – President Rumen Radev
- Canada – Prime Minister Justin Trudeau
- Croatia – President Zoran Milanović
- Czech Republic – Prime Minister Petr Fiala
- Denmark – Prime Minister Mette Frederiksen
- Estonia – Prime Minister Kaja Kallas
- France – President Emmanuel Macron
- Germany – Chancellor Olaf Scholz
- Greece – Prime Minister Kyriakos Mitsotakis
- Hungary – Prime Minister Viktor Orbán
- Iceland – Prime Minister Katrín Jakobsdóttir
- Italy – Prime Minister Mario Draghi
- Latvia – President Egils Levits
- Lithuania – President Gitanas Nausėda
- Luxembourg – Prime Minister Xavier Bettel
- Montenegro – President Milo Đukanović
- Netherlands – Prime Minister Mark Rutte
- North Macedonia – Prime Minister Dimitar Kovačevski
- Norway – Prime Minister Jonas Gahr Støre
- Poland – President Andrzej Duda
- Portugal – Prime Minister António Costa
- Romania – President Klaus Iohannis
- Slovakia – President Zuzana Čaputová
- Slovenia – Prime Minister Janez Janša
- Spain – Prime Minister Pedro Sánchez
- Turkey – President Recep Tayyip Erdoğan
- United Kingdom – Prime Minister Boris Johnson
- United States – President Joe Biden
- NATO – Secretary General Jens Stoltenberg
- European Union - Commission President Ursula von der Leyen

=== Non-member states and organisations ===
- Japan – Prime Minister Fumio Kishida
- Ukraine – President Volodymyr Zelenskyy (video address)
