= General debate of the seventy-fifth session of the United Nations General Assembly =

75th United Nations General Debate Assembly

- 22 – 29 September 2020 75th session 75th general debate

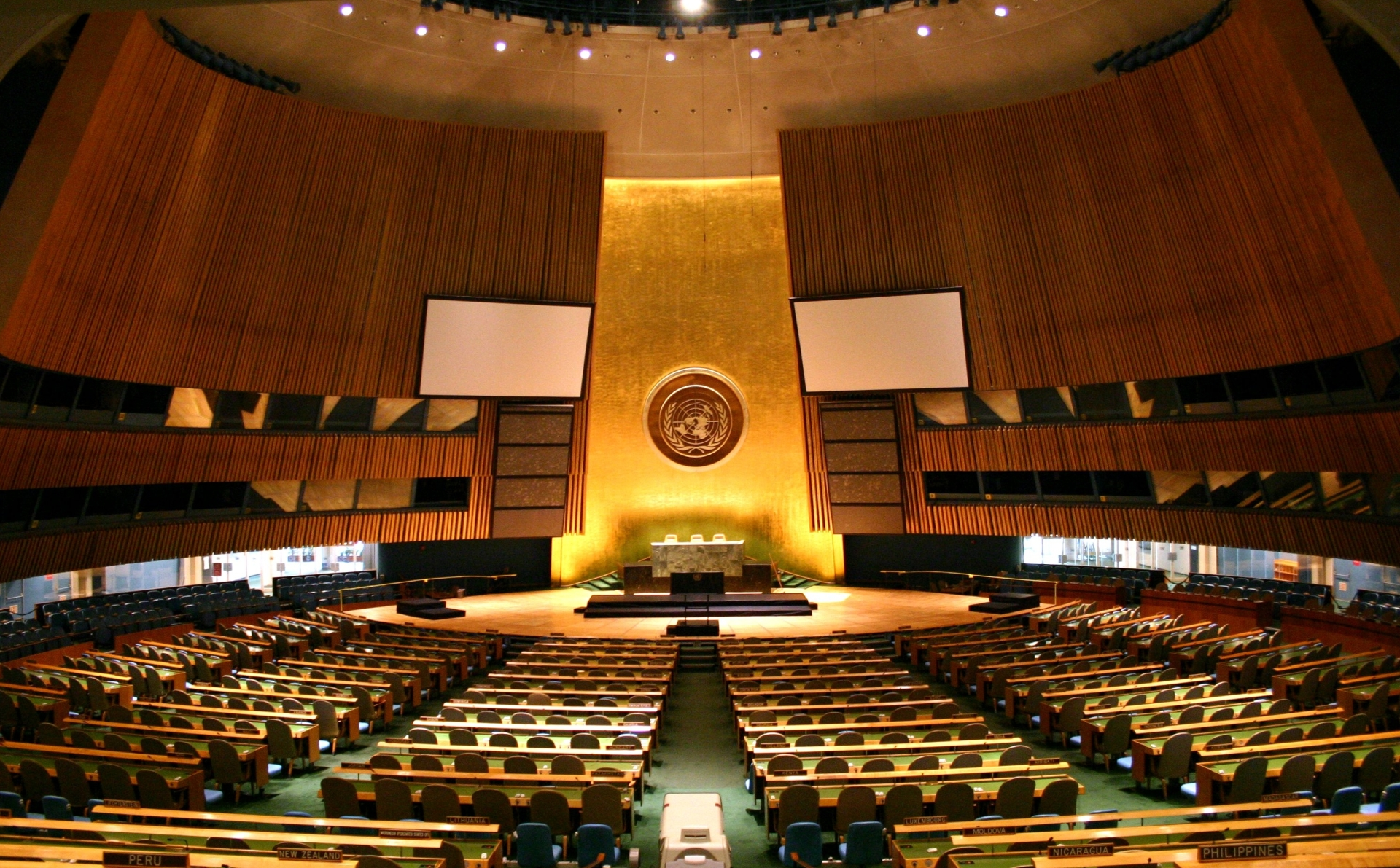
- General Assembly Hall at United Nations Headquarters, New York City
- Host country: United Nations
- Cities: New York City, United States
- Venues: General Assembly Hall at the United Nations Headquarters
- Participants: United Nations Member States
- President: Volkan Bozkır
- Secretary-General: António Guterres
- Website: gadebate.un.org/generaldebate75/en/

The General debate of the seventy-fifth session of the United Nations General Assembly (UNGA) opened on 22 September and ran until 29 September 2020. Leaders from a number of member states addressed the UNGA.

== Organisation and subjects ==
The order of speakers is given first to member states, then observer states and supranational bodies. Any other observer entities will have a chance to speak at the end of the debate, if they so choose. Speakers will be put on the list in the order of their request, with special consideration for ministers and other government officials of similar or higher rank. According to the rules in place for the General Debate, the statements should be in one of the United Nations official languages (Arabic, Chinese, English, French, Russian or Spanish) and will be translated and interpreted by United Nations translators and interpreters. Each speaker is requested to provide 20 advance copies of their statements to the conference officers to facilitate translation and to be presented at the podium. The theme for this year's debate was chosen by President Volkan Bozkır as: "The future we want, the United Nations we need: reaffirming our collective commitment to multilateralism – confronting COVID-19 through effective multilateral action".

== Speaking schedule ==
Since 1955, Brazil and the United States are the first and second countries to speak. Other countries follow according to a speaking schedule issued by the Secretariat.

The list of speakers is provided by both the daily UN Journal, while changes in order are also reflected by the UNGA General Debate website.

=== 22 September ===
==== Morning session ====
- United Nations – Secretary-General António Guterres (Report of the UN Secretary-General)
- United Nations – 75th Session of the United Nations General Assembly - President Volkan Bozkır (Opening statement)
- Brazil – President Jair Bolsonaro
- United States – President Donald Trump
- Turkey – President Recep Tayyip Erdoğan
- China – General Secretary and President Xi Jinping
- Chile – President Sebastián Piñera
- South Africa – President Cyril Ramaphosa
- Cuba – President Miguel Díaz-Canel (Note: First speech to the UNGA General Debate.)
- Russia – President Vladimir Putin
- Jordan – King Abdullah II bin Al Hussein
- South Korea – President Moon Jae-in
- Qatar – Emir Tamim bin Hamad Al Thani
- Philippines – President Rodrigo Duterte
- Iran – President Hassan Rouhani
- France – President Emmanuel Macron

==== Evening session ====
- Colombia – President Iván Duque
- Turkmenistan – President Gurbanguly Berdimuhamedov
- Egypt – President Abdel Fattah el-Sisi
- Tajikistan – President Emomali Rahmon
- Mexico – President Andrés Manuel López Obrador
- Uruguay – President Luis Lacalle Pou
- Seychelles – President Danny Faure
- Rwanda – President Paul Kagame
- Angola – President João Lourenço
- Argentina – President Alberto Fernández
- Latvia – President Egils Levits
- Lithuania – President Gitanas Nausėda
- Nigeria – President Muhammadu Buhari
- Costa Rica – President Carlos Alvarado Quesada
- Sri Lanka – President Gotabaya Rajapaksa
- Indonesia – President Joko Widodo
- Peru – President Martín Vizcarra
- Democratic Republic of the Congo – President Félix Tshisekedi

=== 23 September ===
==== Morning session ====
- Bosnia and Herzegovina – Chairman of the Presidency Šefik Džaferović
- Uzbekistan – President Shavkat Mirziyoyev
- Hungary – President János Áder
- Kazakhstan – President Kassym-Jomart Tokayev
- Saudi Arabia – King Salman bin Abdulaziz Al-Saud
- North Macedonia – President Stevo Pendarovski
- Ghana – President Nana Akufo-Addo
- Mozambique – President Filipe Nyusi
- Iraq – President Barham Salih
- Finland – President Sauli Niinistö
- Kyrgyzstan – President Sooronbay Zheenbekov
- Palau – President Tommy Remengesau Jr.
- Moldova – President Igor Dodon
- Algeria – President Abdelmadjid Tebboune
- Honduras – President Juan Orlando Hernández
- Lebanon – President Michel Aoun
- Slovakia – President Zuzana Čaputová
- Kenya – President Uhuru Kenyatta
- Zambia (Scheduled)
- Namibia – President Hage Geingob
- Liberia – President George Weah

==== Evening session ====
- Ecuador – President Lenín Moreno
- Bolivia – Interim President Jeanine Áñez
- Ukraine – President Volodymyr Zelenskyy
- Suriname – President Chan Santokhi
- Switzerland – President Simonetta Sommaruga
- Serbia – President Aleksandar Vučić
- Guyana – President Irfaan Ali
- Paraguay – President Mario Abdo Benítez
- Afghanistan – President Ashraf Ghani
- Poland – President Andrzej Duda
- Dominican Republic – President Luis Abinader
- Venezuela – President (Disputed) Nicolás Maduro
- Panama – President Laurentino Cortizo
- Mongolia – President Khaltmaagiin Battulga
- Marshall Islands – President David Kabua
- Togo – (Scheduled)
- Liberia (Scheduled)

=== 24 September ===
==== Morning session ====
- Niger – President Mahamadou Issoufou
- Ivory Coast – President Alassane Ouattara
- Albania – President Ilir Meta
- Cyprus – (Scheduled)
- Slovenia – President Borut Pahor
- Monaco – Prince Albert II
- Yemen – President Abdrabbuh Mansur Hadi
- Burkina Faso – President Roch Marc Christian Kaboré
- Estonia – President Kersti Kaljulaid
- Malawi – President Lazarus Chakwera
- Congo – President Denis Sassou Nguesso
- Bahrain – King Hamad bin Isa Al Khalifa
- Botswana – President Mokgweetsi Masisi
- Guinea – President Alpha Condé
- Gambia – President Adama Barrow
- Gabon – President Ali Bongo Ondimba
- Libya – President Fayez al-Sarraj
- Cyprus – President Nicos Anastasiades

==== Evening session ====
- Sierra Leone (Scheduled)
- Azerbaijan – President Ilham Aliyev
- Zambia – President Edgar Lungu
- Equatorial Guinea – President Teodoro Obiang Nguema Mbasogo
- Haiti – President Jovenel Moïse
- Vietnam – President Nguyễn Phú Trọng
- Zimbabwe – President Emmerson Mnangagwa
- East Timor – President Francisco Guterres
- Mali (Scheduled)
- São Tomé and Príncipe – President Evaristo Carvalho
- Comoros – President Azali Assoumani
- Tanzania (Scheduled)
- Nauru – President Lionel Aingimea
- Guinea-Bissau – President Umaro Sissoco Embaló
- Somalia – President Mohamed Abdullahi Mohamed
- Central African Republic – President Faustin-Archange Touadéra
- Marshall Islands (Scheduled)
- Djibouti – President Ismaïl Omar Guelleh
- Burundi – President Évariste Ndayishimiye
- Sierra Leone – President Julius Maada Bio

=== 25 September ===
==== Morning session ====
- Federated States of Micronesia – President David Panuelo
- Holy See – Pope Francis
- Palestine – President Mahmoud Abbas
- European Union – President of the European Council Charles Michel
- Netherlands – Prime Minister Mark Rutte
- Nepal – Prime Minister Khadga Prasad Sharma Oli
- Georgia – Prime Minister Giorgi Gakharia
- Czech Republic – Prime Minister Andrej Babiš
- Greece – Prime Minister Kyriakos Mitsotakis
- Croatia – Prime Minister Andrej Plenković
- Italy – Prime Minister Giuseppe Conte
- Armenia – Prime Minister Nikol Pashinyan
- Pakistan – Prime Minister Imran Khan
- Kuwait – Prime Minister Sabah Al-Khalid Al-Sabah
- Tuvalu – Prime Minister Kausea Natano
- Spain – Prime Minister Pedro Sánchez

==== Evening session ====
- Kiribati – President Taneti Maamau
- Portugal – Prime Minister António Costa
- Bulgaria – Prime Minister Boyko Borisov
- Ethiopia – Prime Minister Abiy Ahmed
- Denmark – Prime Minister Mette Frederiksen
- Luxembourg – Prime Minister Xavier Bettel
- Thailand – Prime Minister Prayut Chan-o-cha
- Canada – Prime Minister Justin Trudeau
- Antigua and Barbuda – Prime Minister Gaston Browne
- Australia – Prime Minister Scott Morrison
- Bhutan – Prime Minister Lotay Tshering
- Japan – Prime Minister Yoshihide Suga
- Malta – Prime Minister Robert Abela
- Papua New Guinea – Prime Minister James Marape
- Eswatini – Prime Minister Ambrose Mandvulo Dlamini
- Tonga – Prime Minister Pohiva Tuʻiʻonetoa
- Chad – Foreign Minister Amine Abba Sidick

=== 26 September ===
==== Morning session ====
- India – Prime Minister Narendra Modi
- Mauritius – Prime Minister Pravind Jugnauth
- Andorra – Prime Minister Xavier Espot Zamora
- United Kingdom – Prime Minister Boris Johnson
- Bangladesh – Prime Minister Sheikh Hasina
- Fiji – Prime Minister Frank Bainimarama
- Malaysia – Prime Minister Muhyiddin Yassin
- Cambodia – Prime Minister Hun Sen
- Norway – Prime Minister Erna Solberg
- Solomon Islands – Prime Minister Manasseh Sogavare
- Jamaica – Prime Minister Andrew Holness
- Samoa – Prime Minister Tuilaepa Sailele Malielegaoi
- Lesotho – Prime Minister Moeketsi Majoro
- Sweden – Prime Minister Stefan Löfven
- Saint Vincent and the Grenadines – Prime Minister Ralph Gonsalves
- Laos – Prime Minister Thongloun Sisoulith
- Belgium – Prime Minister Sophie Wilmès
- Ireland – Taoiseach Micheál Martin
- Morocco – Prime Minister Saadeddine Othmani

==== Evening session ====
- Saint Kitts and Nevis – Prime Minister Timothy Harris
- Saint Lucia – Prime Minister Allen Chastanet
- Trinidad and Tobago – Prime Minister Keith Rowley
- Bahamas – Prime Minister Hubert Minnis
- Sudan – Prime Minister Abdalla Hamdok
- Vanuatu – Prime Minister Bob Loughman
- Cape Verde – Prime Minister Ulisses Correia e Silva
- Morocco (Scheduled)
- Madagascar – Prime Minister Christian Ntsay
- Syria – Deputy Prime Minister Walid Muallem
- Singapore – Foreign Minister Vivian Balakrishnan
- Senegal – Foreign Minister Amadou Ba
- Liechtenstein – Foreign Minister Katrin Eggenberger
- Austria – Foreign Minister Alexander Schallenberg
- Belarus – Foreign Minister Vladimir Makei

=== 29 September ===
==== Morning session ====
- Iceland – Foreign Minister Guðlaugur Þór Þórðarson
- San Marino – Foreign Secretary Luca Beccari
- United Arab Emirates – Foreign Minister Abdullah bin Zayed Al Nahyan
- Germany – Foreign Minister Heiko Maas
- Belize – Foreign Minister Wilfred Elrington
- Romania – Foreign Minister Bogdan Aurescu
- Eritrea – Foreign Minister Osman Saleh Mohammed
- Myanmar – Minister of the State Counsellor's Office Kyaw Tint Swe
- Maldives – Foreign Minister Abdulla Shahid
- Montenegro – Foreign Minister Srđan Darmanović
- Mauritania – Foreign Minister Ismail Ould Cheikh Ahmed
- Oman – Foreign Minister Badr bin Hamad Al Busaidi
- Israel (Scheduled)
- Benin – Foreign Minister Aurélien Agbénonci
- Israel – Prime Minister Benjamin Netanyahu
- Nicaragua – Foreign Minister Denis Moncada
- Guatemala – Foreign Minister Pedro Brolo
- Dominica – Foreign Minister Kenneth Darroux
- Tunisia – Foreign Minister Othman Jerandi

==== Evening session ====
- El Salvador – President Nayib Bukele
- Grenada – Foreign Minister Peter David
- Barbados – Foreign Minister Jerome Walcott
- Cameroon – Foreign Minister Lejeune Mbella Mbella
- New Zealand – Permanent Representative Craig Hawke
- North Korea – Permanent Representative Kim Song
- Uganda – Deputy Permanent Representative Philip Ochen Odida
- Togo – Permanent Representative Kokou Kpayedo
- Tanzania – Permanent Representative Kennedy Gastorn
- No representatives for Brunei, Mali and South Sudan were on the agenda of the General Debate.

== See also ==
- List of UN General Assembly sessions
- List of General debates of the United Nations General Assembly
