= 2019 London NATO summit =

2019 NATO summit meeting in Watford, England

NATO Summit London 2019 2019 London Summit

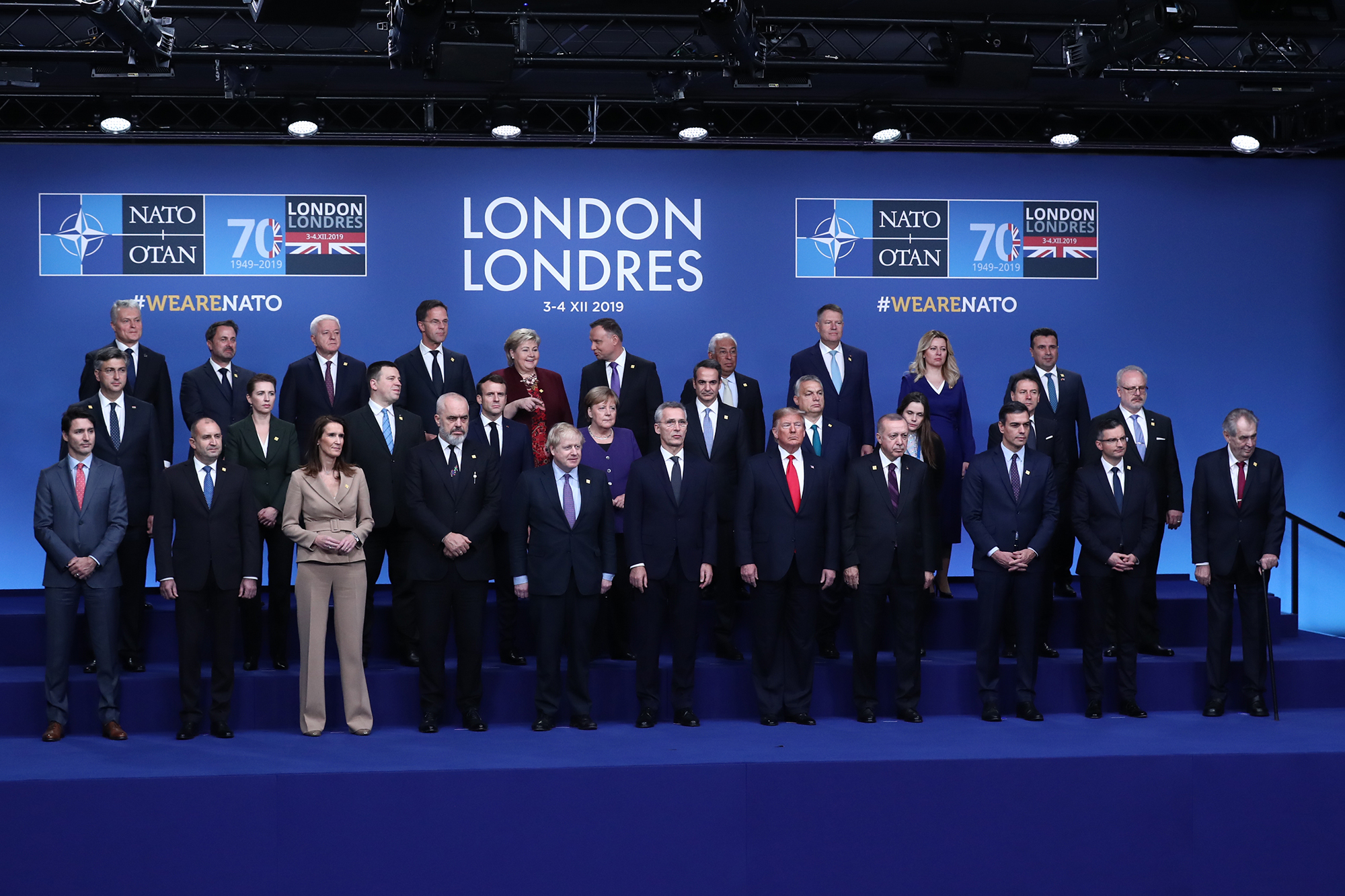
- Host country: United Kingdom
- Date: 3–4 December 2019
- Cities: Watford, Hertfordshire, England, United Kingdom
- Follows: 2018 Brussels summit
- Precedes: 2021 Brussels summit
- Website: www.nato.int

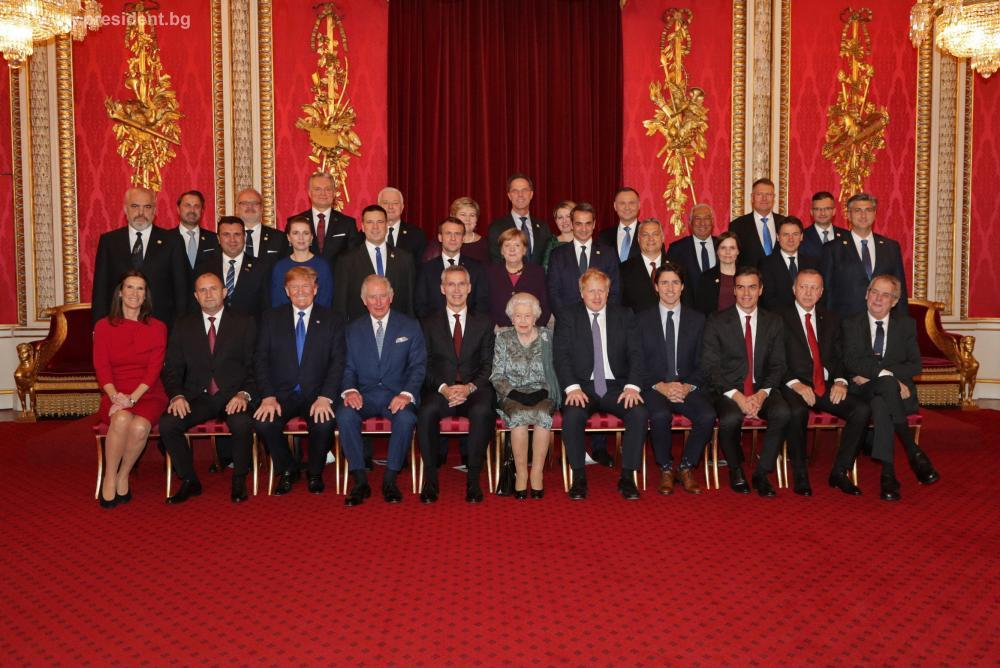
Group photo during the dinner at Buckingham Palace

The 2019 London Summit of the North Atlantic Treaty Organization (NATO) was the formal meeting of the heads of state and heads of government of the North Atlantic Treaty Organization. It was held in The Grove, Watford, Hertfordshire, England, United Kingdom, on 3 and 4 December 2019.

It also marked the 70th anniversary of the founding of NATO.

== Leaders and other dignitaries in attendance ==
=== Member states ===
- Albania – Prime Minister Edi Rama
- Belgium – Prime Minister Sophie Wilmès
- Bulgaria – President Rumen Radev
- Canada – Prime Minister Justin Trudeau
- Croatia – Prime Minister Andrej Plenković
- Czech Republic – President Miloš Zeman
- Denmark – Prime Minister Mette Frederiksen
- Estonia – Prime Minister Jüri Ratas
- France – President Emmanuel Macron
- Germany – Chancellor Angela Merkel
- Greece – Prime Minister Kyriakos Mitsotakis
- Hungary – Prime Minister Viktor Orbán
- Iceland – Prime Minister Katrín Jakobsdóttir
- Italy – Prime Minister Giuseppe Conte
- Latvia – President Egils Levits
- Lithuania – President Gitanas Nausėda
- Luxembourg – Prime Minister Xavier Bettel
- Montenegro – Prime Minister Duško Marković
- Netherlands – Prime Minister Mark Rutte
- Norway – Prime Minister Erna Solberg
- Poland – President Andrzej Duda
- Portugal – Prime Minister António Costa
- Romania – President Klaus Iohannis
- Slovakia – President Zuzana Čaputová
- Slovenia – Prime Minister Marjan Šarec
- Spain – Prime Minister Pedro Sánchez
- Turkey – President Recep Tayyip Erdoğan
- United Kingdom – Prime Minister Boris Johnson
- United States – President Donald Trump
- NATO – Secretary General Jens Stoltenberg

=== Non-member states and organisations ===
- North Macedonia – Prime Minister Zoran Zaev

== Controversies ==
U.S. President Donald Trump said French President Emmanuel Macron's November comment that NATO was in a state of "brain death" for its reaction to the 2019 Turkish offensive into north-eastern Syria was "very, very nasty." The two leaders disagreed about terrorism, trade, and France's contributions to NATO's budget. Trump mentioned the possibility of France "breaking off" from NATO, although Macron made no such suggestion.

Trump and U.K. Prime Minister Boris Johnson did not meet because Johnson was concerned about Trump's possible interference with the UK general election on 12 December.

While meeting with Canadian Prime Minister Justin Trudeau, Trump complained that Canada is "slightly delinquent" in its contribution to NATO because it pays less than 2% of its GDP on the military. The two leaders had a friendly discussion about the United States–Mexico–Canada Agreement. Later, during a reception at Buckingham Palace, Trudeau, Johnson, Macron, and Dutch Prime Minister Mark Rutte seemed to mock Trump because of a 45-minute press conference. In turn, Trump called Trudeau, "two-faced," referencing Canada's military spending.

Turkish President Recep Tayyip Erdoğan insisted that NATO members formally recognize the Kurdish YPG as a terrorist organization. Erdoğan and Greek Prime Minister Kyriakos Mitsotakis also met to discuss a contentious maritime agreement signed between Turkey and Libya for the definition of maritime zones in the Eastern Mediterranean.

== Other ==
Due to its political crisis, Spain was the last country left to approve North Macedonia's NATO membership; nonetheless, North Macedonia was given a seat at the summit alongside other members and represented by a delegation headed by Prime Minister Zoran Zaev.

On 26 November 2019, an earthquake struck Albania. At the NATO London summit, constructive discussions were held by Albanian prime minister Edi Rama with Macron, Trump, Trudeau, Johnson and other European leaders over establishing an international conference for financial aid.
