= List of presidential trips made by Emmanuel Macron =

This is a list of presidential trips made by Emmanuel Macron as the 25th President of France.

This list excludes trips made within Paris, the French capital in which the Élysée Palace, the official residence and principal workplace of the President, is located and Le Touquet, the location of Macron's house. International trips are included. The number of visits per country and department where he travelled are:

Domestic trips:

- One visit to Alpes-Maritimes, Corrèze, Ille-et-Vilaine, Finistère, Guadeloupe, Guyane, Haute-Garonne, Haute-Savoie, Haute-Vienne, Hautes-Alpes, Hautes-Pyrénées, Haut-Rhin, Loir-et-Cher, Loire-Atlantique, Loiret, Lyon Metropolis, Morbihan, Moselle, Pas-de-Calais, Puy-de-Dôme, Saint-Barthélémy, Saint-Martin, Saint Pierre and Miquelon, Savoie, Somme, Val-de-Marne and Var.
- Two visits to Bas-Rhin, Hauts-de-Seine, Nord and Seine-Maritime.
- Three visits to Bouches-du-Rhône.
- Six visits to Seine-Saint-Denis.
- Eight visits to Yvelines.

International trips:

Map of international trips made by Emmanuel Macron as president: 1 visit 2 visits 4 visits 5 visits More than 5 visits

- One visit to Algeria, Andorra, Austria, Australia, Bulgaria, Burkina Faso, China, Côte d'Ivoire, Estonia, Ghana, Greece, Luxembourg, Niger, Qatar, Romania, Saudi Arabia, South Korea, Sweden, United Arab Emirates, and the United Kingdom.
- Two visits to Morocco, Mali, Switzerland, Tunisia and the United States.
- Three visits to Italy.
- Five visits to Germany.
- Six visits to Belgium.

== 2017 ==
=== May ===
Department/Country	Areas visited	Date(s)	Details
Germany	Berlin	15 May	Emmanuel Macron's state visit to Germany was his first international trip as president. He chose Germany as the first foreign trip of his presidency in a demonstration of a pro-European sign, as well as to follow the tradition of French presidents making their first international trip to Germany. During his first full day in office, Macron met with German Chancellor Angela Merkel. The two leaders agreed to construct a plan to reform the European Union amidst the rise of right-wing populism and Euroscepticism.
Mali	Gao	19 May	Macron met with French troops committed to Operation Barkhane. This was his first trip outside Europe as president.
Belgium	Brussels	25–26 May	Macron attended the NATO summit, his first summit meeting as president. He held separate bilateral meetings with other heads of government, including U.S. President Donald Trump.
Italy	Taormina	26–27 May	Macron attended the 43rd G7 summit. He held separate bilateral meetings with other heads of government, including British Prime Minister Theresa May, Canadian Prime Minister Justin Trudeau and Japanese Prime Minister Shinzō Abe.
Yvelines	Versailles	29 May	Macron met Russian President Vladimir Putin in the Palace of Versailles.
Loire-Atlantique	Saint-Nazaire	31 May	Macron visited the Chantiers de l'Atlantique in Saint-Nazaire.

=== June ===
Department/Country	Areas visited	Date(s)	Details
Morbihan	Vannes, Étel, Lanester and Lorient	1 June	Macron visited the CROSS of the Bay of Biscay in Étel, a military base in Lanester and the port of Lorient. He met also a disabled child in Vannes.
Seine-Saint-Denis	Saint-Denis	4 June	Macron attended in the Top 14, rugby union league final in the Stade de France.
Haute-Vienne	Oradour-sur-Glane	10 June	Macron attended in the commemorations of the Oradour-sur-Glane massacre.
Seine-Saint-Denis	Saint-Denis	13 June	Macron attended in a friendly football match between France and England with Theresa May in the Stade de France.
Morocco	Rabat	14–15 June	Macron met the king of Morocco, Mohammed VI of during this private and friendly trip.
Seine-Saint-Denis	Le Bourget	19 June	Macron attended in the Paris Air Show.
Belgium	Brussels	22–23 June	Macron attended in his first European Council. He held separate bilateral meetings with Angela Merkel, and the representants of the Visegrád Group.
Germany	Berlin	29 June	Emmanuel Macron met with other European heads of state and government, as part of the preparations for the 2017 G20 Hamburg summit.

=== July ===
Department/Country	Areas visited	Date(s)	Details
Bas-Rhin	Strasbourg	1 July	Macron participated in the tribute ceremony of Helmut Kohl inside the European Parliament in Strasbourg.
Ille-et-Vilaine	Rennes	1 July	Macron has inaugurated the new TGV Atlantique line in the Gare de Rennes.
Mali	Bamako	2 July	Macron attends a security summit of the G5 Sahel to boost support for the creation of a regional counter-terror force.
Yvelines	Versailles	3 July	Macron delivered a speech behind the Congress of the French Parliament in the Palace of Versailles.
Finistère	Crozon	4 July	Emmanuel Macron went as head of the French Armed Forces to the Île Longue military base in the Roadstead of Brest and visited the submarine Le Terrible
Germany	Hamburg	7–8 July	Macron attended in the 2017 G20 Hamburg summit. He held separate bilateral meetings with other heads of government, including Canadian Prime Minister Justin Trudeau, Russian President Vladimir Putin, and with German Chancellor Angela Merkel.
Switzerland	Lausanne	10–11 July	Macron travelled to Lausanne to visit the International Olympic Committee for the presentation of the Paris bid for the 2024 Summer Olympics. During this trip Macron was accompanied by his wife Brigitte, the Mayor of Paris Anne Hidalgo and the chairs of the bid, Bernard Lapasset and Tony Estanguet.
Italy	Trieste	12–13 July	Macron attended in the 2017 Western Balkans Summit. One day before, he meet German Chancellor Angela Merkel and Italian Prime Minister Paolo Gentiloni.
Alpes-Maritimes	Nice	14 July	Macron attended the 2016 Nice truck attack commemorations with former French president Nicolas Sarkozy and François Hollande.
Savoie Hautes-Alpes	Saint-Michel-de-Maurienne, Serre Chevalier	19 July	Macron followed the Tour de France cyclists during the Stage 17. He embarked in the race director's car Christian Prudhomme in Col du Télégraphe entrance in Saint-Michel-de-Maurienne. He continued his journey by entering in the region Provence-Alpes-Côte d'Azur and finished the stage in the sky station of Serre Chevalier. Macron invited the Prime Minister of Denmark, Lars Løkke Rasmussen who is a cycling fan.
Bouches-du-Rhône	Istres	20 July	Macron visited a military base in Istres, to reiterate its support for the Military, after the resignation of Pierre de Villiers, the former Chef d'état-major des Armées.
Yvelines	La Celle-Saint-Cloud	25 July	Macron organized a peace a meeting, between Fayez al-Sarraj (Presidential Council), and Khalifa Haftar (Libyan National Army), in order to sign a cease fire.
Seine-Maritime	Saint-Étienne-du-Rouvray	26 July	Macron attended in the 2016 Normandy church attack commemorations with Prime Minister Édouard Philippe.
Loiret	Orléans	27 July	The French head of state was present in Orléans, Loiret to meet families of refugees and attend a naturalization ceremony. The Minister of the Interior, Gérard Collomb, was also present.

=== August ===
Department/Country	Areas visited	Date(s)	Details
Yvelines	Moisson	3 August	The president met, in a nautical base of the suburbs of Paris, young people deprived of holidays.
Bouches-du-Rhône	Allauch, Marseille	10–20 August	Macron spent some holidays in the south of France.
Austria	Salzburg	23 August	Macron met with Austrian Chancellor Christian Kern.
Romania	Bucharest	24 August	Macron met with Romanian President Klaus Iohannis.
Bulgaria	Varna	25 August	Macron met with Bulgarian President Rumen Radev and Prime Minister Boyko Borisov at the Euxinograd Palace.
Yvelines	Hermeray	27 August	The president adopted a Labrador at the SPA refuge.
Luxembourg	Luxembourg City, Niederanven	28 August	Macron met with Grand Duke Henri and Grand Duchess Maria Teresa of Luxembourg. He then traveled to Senningen Castle to participate in political talks with the Prime Minister of Luxembourg, Xavier Bettel, and Belgian Prime Minister Charles Michel.
Seine-Saint-Denis	Saint-Denis	31 August	Macron attended a football match between France and the Netherlands for the 2018 FIFA World Cup qualification at Stade de France.

=== September ===
Department/Country	Areas visited	Date(s)	Details
(Moselle (department)) Moselle	Forbach	4 September	Macron visited a school for the start of the academic year.
Greece	Athens	6–7 September	Macron paid a state visit to Greece where he called to rebuild the European Union.
Haute-Savoie	Évian-les-Bains	7 September	Macron attended the 26th French-German meeting.
Haute-Garonne	Toulouse	11 September	Macron launched a plan for emergency housing for the most disadvantaged. Toulouse was chosen by the President to be a pilot city for this project.
Guadeloupe	Pointe-à-Pitre	12–13 September	The President visited islands severely destroyed by Hurricane Irma
(Collectivity of Saint Martin) Saint-Martin	Saint-Martin	12–13 September	The President visited islands severely destroyed by Hurricane Irma
Saint-Barthélemy	Saint-Barthélemy	12–13 September	The President visited islands severely destroyed by Hurricane Irma
Yvelines	Le Port-Marly	16 September	Macron visited with French TV-animator Stéphane Bern, the Château de Monte-Cristo in Le Port-Marly during the European Heritage Days.
United States	New York City	18–20 September	Macron attended the 72nd United Nations General Assembly and met with several heads of state.
Bouches-du-Rhône	Marseille	21 September	Macron visited the 2024 Summer Olympics venues for sailing and soccer.
Lyon Metropolis	Lyon	27–28 September	Accompanied by the Minister of the Interior Gérard Collomb, Macron traveled to Lyon to meet law enforcement officials.
Estonia	Tallinn; Tapa Army Base	28–29 September	Macron attended the EU Digital Summit and held a bilateral meeting with German Chancellor Angela Merkel. He then visited troops together with British Prime Minister Theresa May and Estonian Prime Minister Jüri Ratas at Tapa Army Base.

=== October ===
Department/Country	Areas visited	Date(s)	Details
Somme	Amiens	3 October	Macron visited the sites of the companies Whirlpool and Amazon.
Corrèze	Égletons	4 October	Macron launched the reform of the professional learnings.
Germany	Frankfurt	10 October	Macron and German Chancellor Angela Merkel attended the opening of the Frankfurt Book Fair.
Val-de-Marne	Rungis	11 October	Macron visited the Rungis International Market.
Hauts-de-Seine	Gennevilliers	17 October	Macron had lunch with actors of associative life.
Belgium	Brussels	19–20 October	EU Summit
French Guiana	Maripasoula, Cayenne	26–28 October	Macron visited French Guiana while protests occurred about the economic growth of this territory.
Bas-Rhin	Strasbourg	31 October	Macron visited the Council of Europe and the European Court of Human Rights at the end of the state of emergency in France. Later on he went to the Opéra national du Rhin.

=== November ===
Department/Country	Areas visited	Date(s)	Details
Seine-Maritime	Le Havre	4 November	Macron visited Le Havre the day before the departure of the Transat Jacques Vabre.
United Arab Emirates	Abu Dhabi, Dubai	8–9 November	Macron inaugurated the Louvre Abu Dhabi.
Saudi Arabia	Riyadh	9 November	Macron made an emergency Saudi Arabia trip over Lebanon war fears.
Haut-Rhin	Wattwiller	10 November	Macron inaugurated a historical museum at the Hartmannswillerkopf, together with the German President Frank-Walter Steinmeier.
Seine-Saint-Denis	Saint-Denis	13 November	Macron attended the commemoration of the November 2015 Paris attacks.
Seine-Saint-Denis	Clichy-sous-Bois	13 November	Macron made two visits related to the policies for the cities.
(Nord (French department)) Nord	Roubaix, Tourcoing	13–14 November	Macron made two visits related to the policies for the cities.
Germany	Bonn	15 November	Macron attended the opening ceremony of the 2017 United Nations Climate Change Conference.
Sweden	Gothenburg	17 November	Macron attended the Union European social summit.
Burkina Faso	Ouagadougou	28–29 November	Macron met with the Burkinabe President, did a speech about Africa, exchanged with students and visited a solar-powered plant.
Côte d'Ivoire	Abidjan	29–30 November	Macron attended the Africa-European Union summit.
Ghana	Accra	30 November	Macron met with the Ghanaian president and visited some local start-ups.

=== December ===
Department/Country	Areas visited	Date(s)	Details
Algeria	Algiers	6 December	Macron made a work and friendship visit in Algeria.
Qatar	Doha	7 December	Macron paid an official visit to Qatar.
Hauts-de-Seine	Boulogne-Billancourt	12 December	Macron participated the One Planet Summit.
Yvelines	La Celle-Saint-Cloud	13 December	Macron attended a security summit of the G5 Sahel.
Belgium	Brussels	14–15 December	Macron attended in a European Council.
Loir-et-Cher	Saint-Aignan, Chambord	15–17 December	Macron visited the ZooParc de Beauval and spent a night at Chambord for a family event.
Niger	Niamey	22–23 December	Macron visited the French troops from Operation Barkhane.
Hautes-Pyrénées	Bagnères-de-Bigorre	23–26 December	Macron went skiing.

== 2018 ==
=== January ===
Department/Country	Areas visited	Date(s)	Details
China	Xi'an, Beijing	8–10 January	Macron arrived in Xi'an first, visited the Terracotta Army, Giant Wild Goose Pagoda and Xi'an great mosque. He also delivered a speech about multilateralism at Daming Palace National Heritage Park. Later he flew to Beijing, visited the Palace Museum and met with the Chinese President Xi Jinping and Premier Li Keqiang.
Italy	Rome	11 January	Macron met southern European Union leaders about migration and budgets at Med7 summit.
Pas-de-Calais	Croisilles, Calais	16 January	Macron explained his policy on migration.
United Kingdom	Camberley, London	18 January	Macron met with Prime Minister Theresa May.
(Var (department)) Var	Toulon	19 January	Macron greets the French army.
(Nord (French department)) Nord	Valenciennes	22 January	Macron visited the Toyota plant to announce investments.
Yvelines	Versailles	22 January	Macron invited investors in Versailles to promote France.
Switzerland	Davos	24 January	Macron made a speech in Davos.
Puy-de-Dôme	Cébazat, Saint-Genès-Champanelle, Chamalières, Orcines, Picherande	25–26 January	Macron visited Michelin plant and greeted farmers.

=== February ===
Department/Country	Areas visited	Date(s)	Details
Tunisia	Tunis	31 January–1 February	Macron spoke in front of the Tunisian Parliament, attended an economic summit, and held talks with President Essebsi.
Senegal	Dakar, Saint-Louis	2–3 February	Macron met with President Macky Sall.
Corsica	Bastia, San-Giuliano	06–07 February	Macron met with representatives from Corsica.
South Korea	Pyeongchang	9 February	Macron attended the 2018 Winter Olympics opening ceremony.
Belgium	Brussels	23 February	Macron attended an extraordinary European Council on Brexit.

=== March ===
Department/Country	Areas visited	Date(s)	Details
Belgium	Brussels	22–23 March	Macron attended the European Council.

=== April ===
Department/Country	Areas visited	Date(s)	Details
United States	Washington, D.C.	23–25 April	Macron met with President Donald Trump.

=== May ===
Department/Country	Areas visited	Date(s)	Details
Australia	Sydney	1–2 May	Macron met Prime Minister Malcolm Turnbull.

=== June ===
Department/Country	Areas visited	Date(s)	Details
Canada	La Malbaie	8–9 June	Macron attended the 44th G7 summit.

=== July ===
Department/Country	Areas visited	Date(s)	Details
Belgium	Brussels	11–12 July	Macron attended the NATO summit.

=== August ===
Department/Country	Areas visited	Date(s)	Details
Denmark	Copenhagen	28–29 August	Macron paid a state visit to Denmark.

=== December ===
Department/Country	Areas visited	Date(s)	Details
Argentina	Buenos Aires	30 November – 1 December 2018	Macron attended the 2018 G20 Buenos Aires summit.

== Future trips ==
Department/Country	Areas visited	Date(s)	Details
Latvia	Riga	29 – 30 September 2020	State visit

During the visit of the Prime Minister of Israel, Benjamin Netanyahu in Paris on July 16, 2017, Macron says that he will visit his counterpart in Israel.

== Multilateral meetings ==
Group	Year					
Group	2017	2018	2019	2020	2021	2022
UN GA	September 18–20, (United States) New York City	September 24–26, (United States) New York City	September, (United States) New York City	September, (United States) New York City	September, (United States) New York City	
G7	May 26–27, (Italy) Taormina	June 8–9, (Canada) La Malbaie	August 24–26, (France) Biarritz	TBD, United States	TBD, United Kingdom	
G-20	July 7–8, (Germany) Hamburg	November 30 – December 1, (Argentina) Buenos Aires	June 28–29, (Japan) Osaka	November 21–22, (Saudi Arabia) Riyadh	TBD, Italy	
NATO	May 25, (Belgium) Brussels	July 11–12, (Belgium) Brussels	December 3–4, (United Kingdom) London	TBD		
NSS				TBD		TBD
OIF		October 11–12, Armenia		TBD, Tunisia		
EP	November 24, (Belgium) Brussels		TBD		TBD	
ASEM		October 18–19, (Belgium) Brussels		TBD, (Cambodia) Phnom Penh		
EU–CELAC	October 26–27, (El Salvador) San Salvador		TBD	TBD		TBD
EU	22–23 June, 19–20 October, 14–15 December, (Belgium) Brussels	23 February, 22–23 March, 28–29 June, 17–18 October, 25 November, 13–14 December, (Belgium) Brussels	21–22 March, 10 April, 20–21 June, 30 June–2 July, 17–18 October, (Belgium) Brussels	TBD, (Belgium) Brussels		
Euro summit	TBD, (Belgium) Brussels					
██ = Did not attend; ██ = Future event.

== See also ==
- Foreign relations of France
- List of international presidential trips made by Emmanuel Macron
- List of international presidential trips made by François Hollande
