= List of international presidential trips made by Emmanuel Macron =

This is a list of international presidential trips made by Emmanuel Macron, the 25th and current president of France. As of November 2026, Emmanuel Macron has made 360 presidential trips to 104 states internationally since his inauguration on 14 May 2017.

== Summary ==
The number of visits per country where President Macron traveled are:

- One visit to Australia, Bahrain, Bangladesh, Benin, Burkina Faso, Cambodia, Cameroon, Chile, the Democratic Republic of the Congo, Estonia, Finland, Ghana, Guinea-Bissau, Greenland (Note: Greenland is a self-governing territory within the Kingdom of Denmark, rather than a sovereign state. For the purposes of this list, it is counted as a separate state.), Iceland, Kazakhstan, Kuwait, Latvia, Madagascar, Malaysia, Mauritius, Mexico, Mongolia, Montenegro, Nigeria, Norway, Papua New Guinea, the Republic of the Congo, Rwanda, Senegal, Singapore, South Korea, Sri Lanka, Syria, Thailand, Uzbekistan, Vanuatu and Vietnam
- Two visits to Algeria, Andorra, Angola, Argentina, Armenia, Austria, Bulgaria, Chad, Côte d'Ivoire, Croatia, Denmark, Djibouti, Gabon, Hungary, Indonesia, Iraq, Ireland, Israel, Kenya, Lithuania, Mali, Malta, Mauritania, Monaco, Niger, Palestine, Serbia, Slovakia, Slovenia, South Africa and Turkey
- Three visits to Albania, Brazil, Canada, the Czech Republic, Ethiopia, Greece, Jordan, Lebanon, Luxembourg, Morocco, Moldova, Romania, Sweden, Tunisia and Ukraine
- Four visits to China, Cyprus, India, Japan, Poland, Portugal, Russia and Saudi Arabia
- Five visits to the Vatican City
- Six visits to Egypt, Qatar, the Netherlands and the United Arab Emirates
- Seven visits to Spain
- Eight visits to Switzerland
- Eleven visits to Italy
- Twelve visits to the United States
- Fifteen visits to the United Kingdom
- Forty visits to Germany
- Sixty-one visits to Belgium

Map of international trips made by Emmanuel Macron as president: (February 2026) 1 visit 2 visits 3 visits 4 visits 5 visits 6 or more visits

== 2017 ==
Country	Areas visited	Date(s)	Details	Image
Germany	Berlin	15 May	Macron's state visit to Germany was his first international trip as president. He chose Germany as the first foreign trip of his presidency in a demonstration of a pro-European sign, as well as to follow the tradition of French presidents making their first international trip to Germany. During his first full day in office, Macron met with German Chancellor Angela Merkel. The two leaders agreed to construct a plan to reform the European Union amidst the rise of right-wing populism and Euroscepticism.	
Mali	Gao	19 May	Macron met with French troops committed to Operation Barkhane. It was his first trip outside Europe as president.	
Belgium	Brussels	25–26 May	Macron attended the NATO summit, his first summit meeting as president. He held separate bilateral meetings with other heads of government, including U.S. President Donald Trump.	
Italy	Taormina	26–27 May	Macron attended the G7 summit in Taormina. He held separate bilateral meetings with other heads of government, including British Prime Minister Theresa May, Canadian Prime Minister Justin Trudeau and Japanese Prime Minister Shinzō Abe.	
Morocco	Rabat	14–15 June	Macron met the King of Morocco Mohammed VI during this private and friendly trip.	
Belgium	Brussels	22–23 June	Macron attended his first European Council. He held separate bilateral meetings with Angela Merkel, and the representants of the Visegrád Group.	
Germany	Berlin	29 June	Macron met with other European heads of state and government, as part of the preparations for the G20 summit.	
Mali	Bamako	2 July	Macron attended a security summit of the G5 Sahel to boost support for the creation of a regional counter-terror force.	
Germany	Hamburg	7–8 July	Macron attended the G20 summit in Hamburg. He held separate bilateral meetings with other heads of government, including Canadian Prime Minister Justin Trudeau, Russian President Vladimir Putin, and with German Chancellor Angela Merkel.	
Switzerland	Lausanne	10–11 July	Macron travelled to Lausanne to visit the International Olympic Committee for the presentation of the Paris bid for the 2024 Summer Olympics. During this trip Macron was accompanied by his wife Brigitte, the Mayor of Paris Anne Hidalgo and the chairs of the bid, Bernard Lapasset and Tony Estanguet.	
Italy	Trieste	12–13 July	Macron attended the 2017 Western Balkans Summit. One day before, he met with German Chancellor Angela Merkel and Italian Prime Minister Paolo Gentiloni.	
Austria	Salzburg	23 August	Macron met with Austrian Chancellor Christian Kern.	
Romania	Bucharest	24 August	Macron met with Romanian President Klaus Iohannis.	
Bulgaria	Varna	25 August	Macron met with Bulgarian President Rumen Radev and Prime Minister Boyko Borisov in Euxinograd Palace.	
Luxembourg	Luxembourg City, Niederanven	28 August	Macron met with Grand Duke Henri and Grand Duchess Maria Teresa of Luxembourg. He also held political talks at Senningen Castle with Prime Minister Xavier Bettel and Belgian Prime Minister Charles Michel.	
Greece	Athens	6–7 September	Macron paid a state visit to Greece where he called to rebuild European Union.	
United States	New York City	18–20 September	Macron participated to the 72nd session of the United Nations General Assembly and met with several heads of state.	
Estonia	Tallinn, Tapa Army Base	28–29 September	Macron attended the EU Digital Summit and held a bilateral meeting with German Chancellor Angela Merkel. He then visited troops together with British Prime Minister Theresa May and Estonian Prime Minister Jüri Ratas at Tapa Army Base.	
Germany	Frankfurt	10 October	Macron and German Chancellor Angela Merkel attended the opening of the Frankfurt Book Fair.	
Belgium	Brussels	19–20 October	Macron attended the European Council.	
United Arab Emirates	Abu Dhabi, Dubai	8–9 November	Macron inaugurated the Louvre Abu Dhabi.	
Saudi Arabia	Riyadh	9 November	Macron made an emergency Saudi Arabia trip over Lebanon war fears.	
Germany	Bonn	15 November	Macron attended the opening ceremony of the 2017 United Nations Climate Change Conference.	
Sweden	Gothenburg	17 November	Macron attended the EU Social Summit for Fair Jobs and Growth.	
Burkina Faso	Ouagadougou	28–29 November	Macron met with Burkinabe President, delivered a speech about Africa, exchanged with students and visited a solar-powered plant.	
Côte d'Ivoire	Abidjan	29–30 November	Macron attended the fifth African Union – European Union summit.	
Ghana	Accra	30 November	Macron met with Ghanaian President and visited some local start-ups.	
Algeria	Algiers	6 December	Macron made a work and friendship visit in Algeria.	
Qatar	Doha	7 December	Macron paid an official visit to Qatar.	
Belgium	Brussels	14–15 December	Macron attended the European Council.	
Niger	Niamey	22–23 December	Macron visited the French troops from Operation Barkhane.	

== 2018 ==
Country	Areas visited	Date(s)	Details	Image
China	Xi'an, Beijing	8–10 January	Macron arrived in Xi'an first, visited the Terracotta Army, Giant Wild Goose Pagoda and Xi'an great mosque. He also delivered a speech about multilateralism at Daming Palace National Heritage Park. Later he flew to Beijing, visited the Palace Museum and met with the Chinese President & CCP General Secretary Xi Jinping and Premier Li Keqiang. He gifted Xi one of the elite cavalry corps’ horses in response to a leased panda from China's "panda diplomacy".	
Italy	Rome	10 January	Macron met Southern European Union leaders to talk about migration and budgets at EU Med summit.	
United Kingdom	Camberley, London	18–19 January	Official visit in the UK in a Brexit context. Macron met with Prime Minister Theresa May in Sandhurst Military Academy for a UK-France Summit to strengthen the Paris-London special relationship on Defence and Security issues. Met with the French Community in London. Macron also accorded an interview to the BBC where he insisted on the importance of the UK-EU relationship after Brexit.	
Switzerland	Davos	24 January	Macron made a speech in Davos at the World Economic Forum.	
Tunisia	Tunis	31 January–1 February	Macron met with President Beji Caid Essebsi.	
Senegal	Dakar, Saint-Louis	2–3 February	Macron met with President Macky Sall.	
Belgium	Brussels	23 February	Macron attended an extraordinary European Council on Brexit.	
India	New Delhi, Varanasi, Mirzapur	9–12 March	Macron met with Prime Minister Narendra Modi and President Ram Nath Kovind.	
Netherlands	The Hague	21 March	Macron met with Prime Minister Mark Rutte and King Willem-Alexander.	
Belgium	Brussels	22–23 March	Macron attended the European Council.	
Germany	Berlin	19 April	Macron met with German Chancellor Angela Merkel.	
United States	Washington, D.C., Mount Vernon	23–25 April	Macron paid a state visit to the United States. He met with President Donald Trump, Vice President Mike Pence and congressional leaders.	
Australia	Sydney	1–3 May	Macron met with Prime Minister Malcolm Turnbull and outlined the French strategy in the Indo-Pacific.	
Germany	Aachen	9–10 May	Macron received the Charlemagne Prize.	
Bulgaria	Sofia	16–17 May	Macron attended the EU–Western Balkans Summit.	
Russia	Saint Petersburg	24–25 May	Macron met with President Vladimir Putin. He also attended the St. Petersburg International Economic Forum.	
Canada	Ottawa, Montreal, La Malbaie	6–9 June	Macron met with Prime Minister Justin Trudeau in Ottawa and Premier of Quebec Philippe Couillard in Montreal. Macron also attended the G7 summit in La Malbaie. He held separate bilateral meetings with other heads of government, including British Prime Minister Theresa May, German Chancellor Angela Merkel, Italian Prime Minister Giuseppe Conte and U.S. President Donald Trump.	
Germany	Gransee	19 June	Macron met with Chancellor Angela Merkel.	
Vatican City	Vatican City	26 June	Macron met with Pope Francis.	
Belgium	Brussels	28–29 June	Macron attended the European Council.	
Mauritania	Nouakchott	2 July	Macron attended the 31st African Union summit.	
Nigeria	Abuja, Lagos	3–4 July	Macron met with President Muhammadu Buhari.	
Russia	Saint Petersburg	10 July	Macron attended the semi-final between France and Belgium of the 2018 FIFA World Cup.	
Belgium	Brussels	11–12 July	Macron attended the NATO summit.	
Russia	Moscow	15 July	Macron attended the 2018 FIFA World Cup Final between France and Croatia with the final victory (4–2) of France national football team.	
Spain	Madrid	26 July	Macron met with the Prime Minister Pedro Sánchez and King Felipe VI.	
Portugal	Lisbon	27 July	Macron met with Prime Minister António Costa, attended a summit on energy and held a consultation about the future of the European Union along with Costa.	
Denmark	Copenhagen	28–29 August	Macron paid a state visit to Denmark. He met with Prime Minister Lars Løkke Rasmussen and Margrethe II.	
Finland	Helsinki	30 August	Macron paid an official visit and met with President Sauli Niinistö and Prime Minister Juha Sipilä.	
Luxembourg	Bourglinster, Luxembourg City	6 September	Macron met with the Prime Minister Xavier Bettel, Belgian Prime Minister Charles Michel and Dutch Prime Minister Mark Rutte.	
Austria	Salzburg	19–20 September	Macron attended an informal summit with the other heads of state or government of the European Union concerning mainly Brexit and the European migrant crisis.	
United States	New York City	24–26 September	Macron participated to the 73rd session of the United Nations General Assembly and met with several heads of state.	
Armenia	Yerevan	10–12 October	Macron travelled to Yerevan to attend the Organisation internationale de la Francophonie Summit.	
Belgium	Brussels	17–19 October	Macron travelled to Brussels to attend a European Council and the 12th Asia–Europe Meeting (ASEM).	
Slovakia	Bratislava	26 October	Macron met with President Andrej Kiska and Prime Minister Peter Pellegrini.	
Czech Republic	Prague	26–27 October	Macron met with President Milos Zeman and Prime Minister Andrej Babis.	
Turkey	Istanbul	27 October	Macron attended a summit hosted by President Recep Tayyip Erdoğan on Syria conflict along with German Chancellor Angela Merkel and Russian President Vladimir Putin.	
Morocco	Tangier, Rabat	15 November	Macron travelled to Morocco to inaugurate along with King Mohammed VI the first high-speed railway line in Africa.	
Germany	Berlin	18 November	Macron travelled to Berlin to commemorate Volkstrauertag along with Chancellor Angela Merkel and President Frank-Walter Steinmeier at the Neue Wache. He also made a speech at the Bundestag about the European Union.	
Belgium	Brussels, Ghent, Molenbeek, Louvain-la-Neuve	19–20 November	Macron paid a state visit to Belgium. He met with King Philippe of Belgium and Prime Minister Charles Michel.	
Belgium	Brussels	25 November	Macron attended an extraordinary summit on Brexit along with the other European Union leaders.	
Argentina	Buenos Aires	28 November – 1 December	Macron met with President Mauricio Macri in Buenos Aires. Macron also attended the G20 summit. He held separate bilateral meetings with other heads of government, including Australian Prime Minister Scott Morrison, Canadian Prime Minister Justin Trudeau, Chinese President & CCP General Secretary Xi Jinping, Japanese Prime Minister Shinzō Abe, South African President Cyril Ramaphosa and Russian President Vladimir Putin.	
Belgium	Brussels	13–14 December	Macron travelled to Brussels to attend a European Council.	
Chad	N’Djamena	22–23 December	Macron visited the French troops from Operation Barkhane and met with President Idriss Déby.	

== 2019 ==
Country	Areas visited	Date(s)	Details	Image
Germany	Aachen	22 January	Macron met with Chancellor Angela Merkel to sign the Aachen Treaty.	
Egypt	Cairo, Abu Simbel	27–29 January	Macron paid an official visit and met with President Abdel Fattah el-Sisi.	
Cyprus	Nicosia	29 January	Macron attended a EU Med summit along with Southern European Union leaders.	
Djibouti	Djibouti City	12 March	Macron met with President Ismaïl Omar Guelleh and visited the French troops based in Djibouti.	
Ethiopia	Lalibela, Addis Ababa	12–13 March	Macron paid a state visit, met with President Sahle-Work Zewde and Prime Minister Abiy Ahmed Ali.	
Kenya	Nairobi	13–14 March	Macron paid a state visit, the first of a French President in Kenya and met with President Uhuru Kenyatta. He also attended the 3rd edition of the One Planet Summit.	
Belgium	Brussels	21–22 March	Macron attended the European Council.	
Belgium	Brussels	10 April	Macron attended an extraordinary European Council on Brexit.	
Germany	Berlin	29 April	Macron attended along with Chancellor Angela Merkel an informal summit with Western Balkans countries.	
Romania	Sibiu	9 May	Macron attended an informal European summit of heads of state or government about the future of the European Union.	
Belgium	Brussels	28 May	Macron attended an informal European summit along with European Union leaders after 2019 European Parliament election.	
United Kingdom	Portsmouth	5 June	Macron attended the 75th anniversary of D-Day commemorative ceremonies alongside international leaders.	
Switzerland	Geneva	11 June	Macron attended the centenary of the International Labour Organization.	
Malta	Valletta	14 June	Macron attended a EU Med summit along with Southern European Union leaders.	
Belgium	Brussels	20–21 June	Macron attended the European Council.	
Japan	Tokyo, Kyoto, Osaka	26–29 June	Macron paid an official visit, met with Prime Minister Shinzō Abe, Emperor Naruhito and with the French community in Tokyo. Macron also attended the G20 summit in Osaka. He held separate bilateral meetings with other heads of government, including Russian President Vladimir Putin, South Korean President Moon Jae-in, Turkish President Recep Tayyip Erdoğan, Brazilian President Jair Bolsonaro and Chinese President & CCP General Secretary Xi Jinping.	
Belgium	Brussels	30 June – 2 July	Macron attended an extraordinary European summit.	
Serbia	Belgrade	15–16 July	Macron paid an official visit and met with President Aleksandar Vučić.	
Tunisia	Tunis	27 July	Macron attended the funeral of late President Beji Caid Essebsi.	
Andorra	Andorra la Vella, Canillo	13 September	Macron in his capacity as Co-Prince of Andorra met with the other Co-Prince Joan Enric Vives i Sicília, the General Syndics of the General Council Roser Suñé Pascuet and Prime Minister Xavier Espot.	
Italy	Rome	18 September	Macron met with President Sergio Mattarella and Prime Minister Giuseppe Conte.	
United States	New York City	22–24 September	Macron participated to the 74th session of the United Nations General Assembly and met with several heads of state.	
Belgium	Brussels	17–18 October	Macron attended the European Council.	
Germany	Frankfurt	28 October	Macron attended the farewell event for European Central Bank President Mario Draghi.	
China	Shanghai, Beijing	4–6 November	Macron met with President & CCP General Secretary Xi Jinping, attended the China International Import Expo and inaugurated the Centre Pompidou West Bund Museum. Macron and Xi signed business and trade deals worth $45 billion during his visit.	
Germany	Berlin	10 November	Macron met with President Frank-Walter Steinmeier and Chancellor Angela Merkel.	
United Kingdom	London, Watford	3–4 December	Macron attended the 30th NATO summit. He held separate bilateral meetings with other heads of government, including U.S. President Donald Trump, British Prime Minister Boris Johnson, German Chancellor Angela Merkel, Turkish President Recep Tayyip Erdoğan, Belgian Prime Minister Sophie Wilmès and Polish President Andrzej Duda.	
Belgium	Brussels	12–13 December	Macron attended the European Council.	
Côte d'Ivoire	Port-Bouët, Abidjan, Bouaké	20–22 December	Macron visited the French troops based in Côte d'Ivoire and met with President Alassane Ouattara. He also paid tribute to French soldiers killed in Bouaké in 2004.	
Niger	Niamey	22 December	Macron made a quick stop in Niamey where he met with President Mahamadou Issoufou and paid tribute to the 71 soldiers from Niger killed the week before.	

== 2020 ==
Country	Areas visited	Date(s)	Details	Image
Germany	Berlin	19 January	Macron attended a meeting on the Libyan Civil War. He also met with British Prime Minister Boris Johnson and German Chancellor Angela Merkel.	
Israel	Jerusalem	21–23 January	Macron travelled to Jerusalem for the World Holocaust Forum to commemorate the 75 years since the liberation of the Auschwitz-Birkenau death camp. Macron also met with Prime Minister Benjamin Netanyahu, President Reuven Rivlin and Benny Gantz.	
Palestine	Ramallah	22 January	Macron paid a short visit to meet with President Mahmoud Abbas.	
Poland	Warsaw, Kraków	3–4 February	Macron paid an official visit to Poland. He met with President Andrzej Duda and Prime Minister Mateusz Morawiecki.	
Germany	Munich	14–15 February	Macron travelled to Bavaria to attend the 56th Munich Security Conference.	
Belgium	Brussels	20–21 February	Macron attended a special European Council.	
Italy	Naples	27 February	Macron attended the 35th Franco-Italian summit. He met with Prime Minister Giuseppe Conte and President Sergio Mattarella.	
United Kingdom	London	18 June	Macron travelled to London to commemorate the Appeal of 18 June and to give the city the Legion of Honour. He also met with Charles, Prince of Wales and Prime Minister Boris Johnson.	
Netherlands	The Hague	23 June	Macron met with Prime Minister Mark Rutte.	
Germany	Gransee	29 June	Macron met with Chancellor Angela Merkel.	
Mauritania	Nouakchott	30 June	Macron attended a G5 Sahel summit and met with President Mohamed Ould Ghazouani.	
Belgium	Brussels	17–21 July	Macron attended an extraordinary European Council to decide the EU economic response to the COVID-19 recession which deeply affected the continent. The summit was among the longest ones in history.	
Lebanon	Beirut	6 August	Macron travelled to Lebanon two days after the 2020 Beirut explosion. He toured the Port of Beirut, the site of the explosions and met with rescuers and local firemen. Macron also met with President Michel Aoun and Prime Minister Hassan Diab.	
Lebanon	Beirut, Jaj	31 August – 1 September	Macron travelled to Lebanon for the second time in a month. He visited Lebanese singer Fairuz in Rabieh. On the next day, he went to Jaj to plant a cedar tree marking the centennial of Greater Lebanon. Then, he met UN representatives and NGO members to discuss reconstruction efforts in Beirut. He also met with President Michel Aoun, Patriarch Bechara Boutros al-Rahi and other political leaders, in addition to visiting injured people at the Rafik Hariri University Hospital.	
Iraq	Baghdad	2 September	Macron travelled to Iraq to assert its "sovereignty", despite regional tensions. He met with President Barham Salih, Prime Minister Mustafa Al-Kadhimi and President of the Kurdistan Region Nechirvan Barzani.	
Lithuania	Vilnius	28–29 September	Macron met with President Gitanas Nausėda and Belarusian Opposition Leader Sviatlana Tsikhanouskaya.	
Latvia	Riga	29–30 September	Macron met with President Egils Levits and Prime Minister Arturs Krišjānis Kariņš.	
Belgium	Brussels	1–2 October	Macron attended an extraordinary European Council.	
Belgium	Brussels	15–16 October	Macron attended the European Council.	
Belgium	Brussels	10–11 December	Macron attended the European Council.	

== 2021 ==
Country	Areas visited	Date(s)	Details	Image
Chad	N'Djamena	22–23 April	Macron attended the funeral of former President Idriss Déby.	
Portugal	Porto	7–8 May	Macron attended the EU Social Summit.	
Belgium	Brussels	24–25 May	Macron attended the European Council.	
Rwanda	Kigali	27–28 May	Macron paid an official visit to Rwanda where he met with President Paul Kagame and visited the Kigali Genocide Memorial.	
South Africa	Pretoria, Johannesburg	28–29 May	Macron paid an official visit to South Africa. He met with President Cyril Ramaphosa and visited the Nelson Mandela Foundation.	
United Kingdom	Carbis Bay	11–13 June	Macron travelled to Carbis Bay to attend the G7 summit. He held separate bilateral meetings with other heads of government, including Canadian Prime Minister Justin Trudeau, Japanese Prime Minister Yoshihide Suga, and U.S. President Joe Biden.	
Belgium	Brussels	14 June	Macron travelled to Brussels to attend the 31st NATO summit.	
Germany	Berlin	18 June	Macron travelled to Berlin to meet with Chancellor Angela Merkel.	
Belgium	Brussels	24–25 June	Macron attended the European Council.	
Japan	Tokyo	23–24 July	Macron travelled to Tokyo to attend the 2020 Summer Olympics opening ceremony.	
Ireland	Dublin	26 August	Macron travelled to Dublin where he met with President Michael D. Higgins and Taoiseach Micheál Martin.	
Iraq	Baghdad, Mosul, Erbil	28–29 August	Macron attended a regional conference in Baghdad to which several leaders of countries neighboring Iraq were invited, including Saudi Arabia and Turkey.	
Greece	Athens	17 September	Macron travelled to Athens to attend the 8th EU Med summit along with Southern European Union leaders.	
Slovenia	Ljubljana	5–6 October	Macron attended an informal European Council and the EU–Western Balkans Summit.	
Belgium	Brussels	21–22 October	Macron attended the European Council.	
Italy	Rome	29–31 October	Macron attended the G20 summit. He also met the day before the summit with U.S. President Joe Biden.	
United Kingdom	Glasgow	1 November	Macron travelled to Scotland to attend the 2021 United Nations Climate Change Conference.	
Croatia	Zagreb	24–25 November	Macron paid an official visit to Croatia, the first of a French President since the country's independence in 1991. He met with President Zoran Milanović and Prime Minister Andrej Plenković.	
Italy	Rome	25–26 November	Macron travelled to Rome where he met with President Sergio Mattarella and Prime Minister Mario Draghi.	
Vatican City	Vatican City	26 November	Macron met with Pope Francis.	
United Arab Emirates	Dubai	3 December	Macron met with Mohammed bin Zayed bin Sultan Al Nahyan. He also visited the French pavilion at the Expo 2020.	
Qatar	Doha	3–4 December	Macron met with Tamim bin Hamad Al Thani.	
Saudi Arabia	Jeddah	4 December	Macron met with Mohammed bin Salman.	
Hungary	Budapest	13 December	Macron met with President János Áder and Prime Minister Viktor Orbán. He also attended a Visegrád Group meeting.	
Belgium	Brussels	15–16 December	Macron attended in Brussels the sixth Eastern Partnership summit and a European Council.	

== 2022 ==
Country	Areas visited	Date(s)	Details	Image
Germany	Berlin	25 January	Macron met with Chancellor Olaf Scholz.	
Russia	Moscow	7 February	Macron met with President Vladimir Putin.	
Ukraine	Kyiv	8 February	Macron met with President Volodymyr Zelenskyy.	
Germany	Berlin	8 February	Macron met with Chancellor Olaf Scholz and Polish President Andrzej Duda.	
Belgium	Brussels	17–18 February	Macron attended in Brussels the sixth European Union – African Union summit.	
Belgium	Brussels	24 February	Macron attended a special meeting of the European Council to discuss the Russian invasion of Ukraine.	
Belgium	Brussels	24–25 March	Macron travelled to Brussels to attend an extraordinary NATO summit and a G7 Leaders meeting about the Russian invasion of Ukraine. He also attended the European Council.	
Germany	Berlin	9 May	Macron travelled to Berlin to meet with Chancellor Olaf Scholz on his first trip abroad after his re-election in April 2022.	
United Arab Emirates	Abu Dhabi	15 May	Macron travelled to Abu Dhabi to pay tribute to the late President of the United Arab Emirates Khalifa bin Zayed Al Nahyan who died two days earlier.	
Belgium	Brussels	30–31 May	Macron attended a special meeting of the European Council.	
Romania	Constanța	14–15 June	Macron visited the French troops based in Constanța. He also met with President Klaus Iohannis and Prime Minister Nicolae Ciucă.	
Moldova	Chișinău	15 June	Macron met with President Maia Sandu.	
Ukraine	Kyiv, Irpin	16 June	Macron met with President Volodymyr Zelenskyy along with German Chancellor Olaf Scholz, Italian Prime Minister Mario Draghi and Romanian President Klaus Iohannis for the first time since the beginning of the Russian invasion of Ukraine. He travelled to Kyiv by train from Rzeszów for safety reasons.	
Belgium	Brussels	23–24 June	Macron attended in Brussels an EU–Western Balkans Leaders meeting, a European Council and a Euro summit.	
Germany	Schloss Elmau	25–28 June	Macron travelled to the Bavarian Alps to attend the 48th G7 summit. He held separate bilateral meetings with other heads of government, including British Prime Minister Boris Johnson and Japanese Prime Minister Fumio Kishida.	
Spain	Madrid	28–30 June	Macron attended the 32nd NATO summit.	
Portugal	Lisbon	30 June	Macron attended the 2022 United Nations Ocean Conference.	
Cameroon	Yaoundé	25–26 July	Macron met with President Paul Biya and French local communities.	
Benin	Cotonou	26–27 July	Macron met with President Patrice Talon and French local communities.	
Guinea-Bissau	Bissau	27–28 July	Macron met with President Umaro Sissoco Embaló and French local communities.	
Algeria	Algiers, Oran	25–27 August	Macron met with President Abdelmadjid Tebboune.	
United Kingdom	London	18–19 September	Macron attended the state funeral of Queen Elizabeth II at Westminster Abbey and met with King Charles III at a reception at Buckingham Palace.	
United States	New York City	19–21 September	Macron attended the 77th session of the United Nations General Assembly and met with several heads of state.	
Germany	Berlin	3 October	Macron travelled to Berlin to meet with Chancellor Olaf Scholz for a working dinner.	
Czech Republic	Prague	6–7 October	Macron attended at Prague Castle the 1st European Political Community Summit and an informal European Council.	
Belgium	Brussels	20–21 October	Macron attended the European Council.	
Italy	Rome	23–24 October	Macron participated in an international forum on peace. He also met with President Sergio Mattarella and Prime Minister Giorgia Meloni.	
Vatican City	Vatican City	24 October	Macron met with Pope Francis.	
Egypt	Sharm El Sheikh	7 November	Macron attended the COP27.	
Indonesia	Bali	14–16 November	Macron travelled to Bali to attend the G20 summit. He held separate bilateral meetings with other heads of government, including Chinese President & CCP General Secretary Xi Jinping, Turkish President Recep Tayyip Erdoğan, Indonesian President Joko Widodo, Singaporean Prime Minister Lee Hsien Loong, Indian Prime Minister Narendra Modi and Australian Prime Minister Anthony Albanese.	
Thailand	Bangkok	16–18 November	Macron attended the APEC summit as an invited guest. He also met with Prime Minister Prayut Chan-o-cha and with the French community in Bangkok.	
Tunisia	Djerba	19 November	Macron attended the Organisation internationale de la Francophonie Summit.	
United States	Washington, D.C., New Orleans	29 November – 2 December	Macron paid a state visit to the United States. He met with President Joe Biden, Vice President Kamala Harris and congressional leaders. He also met with the French community in Washington and travelled to New Orleans.	
Albania	Tirana	6 December	Macron attended the EU–Western Balkans Summit.	
Spain	Alicante	9 December	Macron attended the 9th EU Med summit along with Southern European Union leaders.	
Qatar	Al Khor	14 December	Macron attended the semi-final between France and Morocco of the 2022 FIFA World Cup.	
Belgium	Brussels	15 December	Macron attended the European Council.	
Qatar	Lusail	18 December	Macron attended the 2022 FIFA World Cup Final between France and Argentina.	
Jordan	Amman	20–21 December	Macron attended the second Baghdad Conference for Cooperation and Partnership. He also met with King Abdullah II.	

== 2023 ==
Country	Areas visited	Date(s)	Details	Image
Spain	Barcelona	19 January	Macron attended the Franco-Spanish Summit alongside Prime Minister Pedro Sánchez.	
Netherlands	The Hague	30 January	Macron met with Prime Minister Mark Rutte.	
Belgium	Brussels	9 February	Macron attended the European Council.	
Germany	Munich	17 February	Macron attended the 59th Munich Security Conference.	
Gabon	Libreville	1–2 March	Macron attended the One Forest Summit, met with President Ali Bongo Ondimba and with the French community in Libreville.	
Angola	Luanda	3 March	Macron met with President João Lourenço and French local communities.	
Republic of the Congo	Brazzaville	3 March	Macron met with President Denis Sassou Nguesso and French local communities.	
Democratic Republic of the Congo	Kinshasa	4 March	Macron met with President Félix Tshisekedi and French local communities.	
Belgium	Brussels	23–24 March	Macron attended a European Council and a Euro summit.	
China	Beijing, Guangzhou	5–8 April	Macron paid a state visit to China and met with President & CCP General Secretary Xi Jinping and Premier Li Qiang.	
Netherlands	Amsterdam, The Hague	11–12 April	Macron paid a state visit to the Netherlands. He met with King Willem-Alexander and Prime Minister Mark Rutte.	
Belgium	Ostend	24 April	Macron attended the second edition of the North Sea Summit.	
United Kingdom	London	6–7 May	Macron attended the coronation of King Charles III.	
Iceland	Reykjavík	16–17 May	Macron attended the 4th Council of Europe summit.	
Japan	Hiroshima	19–21 May	Macron attended the G7 summit.	
Mongolia	Ulaanbaatar	21 May	Macron met with President Ukhnaagiin Khürelsükh for the first visit of a French president to Mongolia.	
Slovakia	Bratislava	31 May	Macron met with President Zuzana Čaputová and delivered a speech at GLOBSEC Forum.	
Moldova	Chișinău, Bulboaca	1 June	Macron attended the 2nd European Political Community Summit.	
Germany	Potsdam	6 June	Macron met with Chancellor Olaf Scholz for an informal dinner.	
Belgium	Brussels	29–30 June	Macron attended the European Council.	
Lithuania	Vilnius	11–12 July	Macron attended the 33rd NATO summit.	
Belgium	Brussels	17–18 July	Macron attended the EU-CELAC summit.	
Vanuatu	Port-Vila	27–29 July	Macron made historic visits to clarify the strategy of French diplomacy in the heart of the Indo-Pacific. This is the first French president to travel to non-French Pacific islands.	
Papua New Guinea	Port Moresby	27–29 July	Macron made historic visits to clarify the strategy of French diplomacy in the heart of the Indo-Pacific. This is the first French president to travel to non-French Pacific islands.	
Sri Lanka	Sri Jayawardenapura Kotte	29 July	Macron met with President Ranil Wickremesinghe for the first visit of a French president to Sri Lanka.	
India	New Delhi	9–10 September	Macron attended the G20 summit.	
Bangladesh	Dhaka	10–11 September	Macron met with Prime Minister Sheikh Hasina.	
Italy	Rome	26 September	Macron attended the state funeral of former Italian President Giorgio Napolitano and met with Prime Minister Giorgia Meloni.	
Malta	Valletta	29 September	Macron attended the EU Med summit.	
Spain	Granada	5–6 October	Macron attended the 3rd European Political Community Summit.	
Germany	Hamburg	9–10 October	Macron met with Chancellor Olaf Scholz.	
Albania	Tirana	16–17 October	Macron met with Prime Minister Edi Rama following the Berlin Process Summit to promote stronger cooperation between the European Union and the Western Balkans countries.	
Israel	Tel Aviv	24 October	Macron met with Benjamin Netanyahu.	
Palestine	Ramallah	25 October	Macron met with Mahmoud Abbas.	
Jordan	Amman	25 October	Macron met with King Abdullah II of Jordan.	
Egypt	Cairo	26 October	Macron met with Abdel Fattah el-Sisi.	
Belgium	Brussels	26–27 October	Macron attended the European Council.	
Kazakhstan	Astana	1 November	Macron met with president Kassym-Jomart Tokayev.	
Uzbekistan	Samarkand	2 November	Macron met with president Shavkat Mirziyoyev.	
Switzerland	Bern, Geneva, Lausanne	15–16 November	Macron paid a state visit to Switzerland and met with President Alain Berset.	
Germany	Berlin	20 November	Macron attended the conference of the G20 "Compact with Africa".	
United Arab Emirates	Dubai	1 December	Macron attended the COP28.	
Qatar	Doha	2 December	Macron met with Emir sheikh Tamim bin Hamad Al Thani.	
Belgium	Brussels	13–15 December	Macron attended the EU–Western Balkans Summit followed by the European Council.	
Jordan	Aqaba	22 December	Macron met with King Abdullah II of Jordan and celebrated Christmas with French troops on an air base.	

== 2024 ==
Country	Areas visited	Date(s)	Details	Image
Switzerland	Davos	17 January	Macron made a speech in Davos at the 54th World Economic Forum.	
Germany	Berlin	22 January	Macron spoke at the Bundestag during a tribute to Wolfgang Schäuble. He also met with President Frank-Walter Steinmeier and with Chancellor Olaf Scholz.	
India	Jaipur, New Delhi	25–26 January	Macron was invited as chief guest to celebrate India's 75th Republic Day celebration. He met with President Droupadi Murmu and with Prime Minister Narendra Modi.	
Sweden	Stockholm, Lund, Malmö	30–31 January	Macron paid a state visit to Sweden. He met with King Carl XVI Gustaf, Queen Silvia, and other members of the Swedish royal family. Macron also met with Prime Minister Ulf Kristersson.	
Belgium	Brussels	1 February	Macron attended a Special European Council to discuss budget support to Ukraine.	
Czech Republic	Prague	5 March	Macron met with President Petr Pavel and Prime Minister Petr Fiala.	
Germany	Berlin	15 March	Macron met with Chancellor Olaf Scholz and Polish Prime Minister Donald Tusk in as part of the Weimar Triangle to discuss aid to Ukraine.	
Belgium	Brussels	21–22 March	Macron attended the Nuclear Energy Summit and the European Council summit.	
Brazil	Bélem, Itaguai, Brasilia, São Paulo	26–28 March	Macron paid a state visit to Brazil and met with President Lula. It was Macron's first visit to Brazil as president and his first trip to Latin America since 2018.	
Belgium	Brussels	17–18 April	Macron attended an extraordinary European Council summit.	
Germany	Berlin, Dresden, Münster	26–28 May	Macron paid a state visit to Germany, the first for a French President in Germany since 2000. Macron met with President Frank-Walter Steinmeier and Chancellor Olaf Scholz.	
Italy	Apulia	13–15 June	Macron attended the G7 summit.	
Switzerland	Nidwalden	15 June	Macron attended the Summit on Peace in Ukraine at the Bürgenstock Resort.	
Belgium	Brussels	17 June	Macron attended an informal European Council summit.	
Belgium	Brussels	27–28 June	Macron attended the European Council summit.	
United States	Washington, D.C.	10–11 July	Macron attended the 75th NATO summit. He met with several leaders including American President Joe Biden, British Prime Minister Keir Starmer, and Turkish President Recep Tayyip Erdoğan.	
United Kingdom	Woodstock	18 July	Macron attended the 4th EPC Summit.	
Serbia	Belgrade, Novi Sad	29–30 August	Macron paid an official visit and met with President Aleksandar Vučić.	
United States	New York City	24–25 September	Macron attended the 79th United Nations General Assembly.	
Canada	Ottawa, Montreal	25–26 September	Macron paid an official visit to Canada where he met with Prime Minister Justin Trudeau in Ottawa and Premier of Quebec François Legault in Montreal.	
Germany	Berlin	2 October	Macron met with Chancellor Olaf Scholz and attended Berlin Global Dialogue.	
Cyprus	Paphos	11 October	Macron travelled to Paphos to attend the 11th EU Med summit along with Southern European leaders.	
Belgium	Brussels	16–17 October	Macron attended the first EU-Gulf Cooperation Council summit and the European Council summit.	
Germany	Berlin	18 October	Macron met with Chancellor Olaf Scholz, American President Joe Biden, and British Prime Minister Keir Starmer to discuss the situation in Ukraine and the Middle East.	
Morocco	Rabat	28–30 October	Macron paid a state visit to Morocco. He met with King Mohammed VI.	
Hungary	Budapest	7–8 November	Macron attended the 5th European Political Community Summit and an informal European Council summit.	
Argentina	Buenos Aires	16–17 November	Macron met with President Javier Milei.	
Brazil	Rio de Janeiro	18–19 November	Macron attended the G20 summit and met with several heads of state.	
Chile	Santiago, Valparaíso	20–21 November	Macron met with President Gabriel Boric and addressed the National Congress of Chile.	
Saudi Arabia	Riyadh, Al-Ula	2–4 December	Macron paid a state visit and met with Mohammed bin Salman. He also attended One Water Summit.	
Poland	Warsaw	12 December	Macron met with President Andrzej Duda and Prime Minister Donald Tusk.	
Belgium	Brussels	18 December	Macron attended the EU–Western Balkans Summit and met with President Volodymyr Zelenskyy.	
Djibouti	Djibouti City	20–21 December	Macron visited French troops based in Djibouti to celebrate Christmas. He also met with President Ismaïl Omar Guelleh.	
Ethiopia	Addis Ababa	21 December	Macron met with Prime Minister Abiy Ahmed and inaugurated the newly renovated National Palace.	

== 2025 ==
Country	Areas visited	Date(s)	Details	Image
United Kingdom	Chequers	9 January	Macron met with Prime Minister Keir Starmer to strengthen the special relationship in Europe between France and the UK.	
Lebanon	Beirut, Baabda	17 January	Macron met with President Joseph Aoun at Baabda Palace. He also met with Prime Minister Nawaf Salam.	
Monaco	Monaco	23 January	Macron attended the funeral of Didier Guillaume.	
Poland	Oświęcim	27 January	Macron attended the commemoration of the 80th anniversary of the liberation of the Auschwitz concentration camp.	
Belgium	Brussels	3 February	Macron attended an informal European Council summit.	
United States	Washington, D.C.	24 February	Macron met with President Donald Trump at the White House to discuss about Ukraine.	
Portugal	Lisbon, Porto	27–28 February	Macron paid a state visit to Portugal, the first for a French president since 1999. He met with President Marcelo Rebelo de Sousa and Prime Minister Luís Montenegro.	
United Kingdom	London	2 March	Macron attended the Summit on Ukraine.	
Belgium	Brussels	6 March	Macron attended a Special European Council where the Ukrainian President Volodymyr Zelenskyy was invited to discuss continued support for Ukraine and European defense.	
Germany	Berlin	18 March	Macron met with Chancellor Olaf Scholz and with Friedrich Merz.	
Belgium	Brussels	20–21 March	Macron attended a European Council summit.	
Egypt	Cairo, Arish	6–8 April	Macron paid a three-day official visit to Egypt. In Cairo, he attended a trilateral summit with President Abdel Fattah el-Sisi and King Abdullah II of Jordan. He also visited the port of El-Arish, 50 kilometres west of the Gaza Strip.	
Madagascar	Antananarivo	23–24 April	Macron met with President Andry Rajoelina. He also attended the 5th Indian Ocean Commission summit in Antananarivo.	
Vatican City	Vatican City	25–26 April	Macron attended the funeral of Pope Francis.	
Ukraine	Kyiv	10 May	Macron travelled to Kyiv with German Chancellor Friedrich Merz, British Prime Minister Keir Starmer, and Polish Prime Minister Donald Tusk to meet Volodymyr Zelenskyy and display European unity in support of Ukraine.	
Albania	Tirana	16–17 May	Macron attended the 6th European Political Community Summit and signed cooperation agreements between Albania and France with Prime Minister Edi Rama. Macron also addressed FII Priority Summit.	
Vietnam	Hanoi	25–27 May	Macron paid a state visit to Vietnam. He met with the General Secretary of the Communist Party of Vietnam Tô Lâm and with President Lương Cường.	
Indonesia	Jakarta, Magelang	27–29 May	Macron paid a state visit to Indonesia. He met with President Prabowo Subianto to sign, demonstrate, and announce 21 key agreements spanning multiple sectors. He also visited the Borobudur temple and witnessed the establishment of five frameworks for cultural cooperation in order to improve strategic cooperation between the two nations.	
Singapore	Singapore	29–30 May	Macron paid a state visit to Singapore. He met with President Tharman Shanmugaratnam and Prime Minister Lawrence Wong. Macron delivered a speech to mark the opening of the 22nd Shangri-La Dialogue conference.	
Italy	Rome	3 June	Macron met with Prime Minister Giorgia Meloni.	
Monaco	Monaco	7–8 June	Macron paid a state visit to Monaco, the first for a French President since François Mitterrand in 1984.	
Greenland	Nuuk	15 June	Macron paid an official visit at the invitation of Danish Prime Minister Mette Frederiksen and Greenlandic Prime Minister Jens-Frederik Nielsen to support its territorial integrity following the dispute with the United States. It was the first visit to Greenland by a French president.	
Canada	Kananaskis	16–17 June	Macron attended the 51st G7 summit.	
Norway	Oslo	23–24 June	Macron paid an official visit to Norway, the first for a French president in 41 years. He met with Prime Minister Jonas Gahr Støre before a dinner with King Harald V and Queen Sonja.	
Netherlands	The Hague	24–26 June	Macron attended the 2025 NATO summit.	
Belgium	Brussels	26–27 June	Macron attended the European Council summit.	
Spain	Sevilla	30 June	Macron attended fourth United Nations conference on development.	
United Kingdom	London	8–10 July	Macron paid a state visit to the United Kingdom. He met with King Charles III, Queen Camilla and other members of the British royal family. Macron also met with Prime Minister Keir Starmer.	
Germany	Berlin	23 July	Macron met with Chancellor Friedrich Merz.	
United States	Washington, D.C.	18 August	Macron attended a White House multilateral meeting on Ukraine, in which he held peace talks with President Donald Trump, Ukrainian President Volodymyr Zelenskyy, and other European leaders following the Trump–Putin Alaska Summit.	
Moldova	Chișinău	27 August	Macron met with Moldovan President Maia Sandu along with German chancelor Friedrich Merz and Prime minister of Poland Donald Tusk.	
United States	New York	22–24 September	Macron attended the 80th session of the United Nations General Assembly.	
Denmark	Copenhagen	1–2 October	Macron attended an informal European Council as well as the 7th European Political Community Summit.	
Germany	Sarrebrücken	3 October	Macron attended German Unity Day, marking the 35th anniversary of the reunification.	
Luxembourg	Luxembourg City	3 October	Macron attended a dinner for the coronation of Luxembourg's new monarch, Guillaume V.	
Egypt	Sharm El Sheikh	13 October	Macron attended a Gaza Peace Deal co-hosted by US President Donald Trump and Egyptian President Abdel Fattah el-Sisi.	
Slovenia	Portoroz, Ljubljana	20–21 October	Macron attended the Med9 summit hosted by Prime Minister Robert Golob. He then paid a bilateral visit to Ljubljana and met with President Nataša Pirc Musar.	
Belgium	Brussels	23 October	Macron attended the European Council summit.	
Brazil	Salvador, Belem	5–6 November	Macron attended the COP30.	
Mexico	Mexico City	6–7 November	Macron paid an official visit and met with President Claudia Sheinbaum.	
Germany	Berlin	18 November	Macron attended a summit on european digital sovereignty.	
Mauritius	Port Louis	20–21 November	Macron paid an official visit to Mauritius, the first by a French president since 1993.	
South Africa	Johannesburg	22–23 November	Macron attended the G20 summit, the first held on the African continent.	
Gabon	Libreville	23–24 November	Macron met with President Brice Oligui Nguema.	
Angola	Luanda	24–25 November	Macron attended the European Union and the African Union summit.	
China	Beijing, Chengdu	3–5 December	Macron paid a state visit to China. He met with President Xi Jinping.	
United Kingdom	London	8 December	Macron met with Prime Minister Keir Starmer, Ukrainian President Volodymyr Zelenskyy, and German Chancelor Friedrich Merz.	
Germany	Berlin	15 December	Macron joined peace talks on Ukraine with Ukrainian President Volodymyr Zelenskyy, European leaders, and US envoys.	
Belgium	Brussels	18–19 December	Macron attended the European Council summit.	
United Arab Emirates	Abu Dhabi, Camp de la Paix	21–22 December	Macron visited the Zayed National Museum, held bilateral talks and lunch with Mohammed bin Zayed Al Nahyan, President of the United Arab Emirates. Emmanuel Macron also visited French soldiers stationed abroad, at Camp de la Paix, for an early Christmas celebration.	

== 2026 ==
Country	Areas visited	Date(s)	Details	Image
Switzerland	Martigny	9 January	Macron attended a national day of mourning ceremony in honor of the victims of the 2026 Crans-Montana bar fire.	
Switzerland	Davos	20 January	Macron made a speech in Davos at the 56th World Economic Forum.	
Belgium	Brussels	22 January	Macron attended an informal European Council summit.	
Belgium	Antwerp, Rijkhoven	11–12 February	Macron attended the 3rd European Industry Summit. Next day, he participated in the informal meeting of EU heads of state or government.	
Germany	Munich	13 February	Macron attended the first day of the 62nd Munich Security Conference.	
India	Mumbai, New Delhi	17–19 February	Macron paid an official visit to India and met with Prime Minister Narendra Modi. He also attended the AI Impact Summit.	
Cyprus	Paphos	9 March	Macron discussed strengthening security in the Eastern Mediterranean with President Nikos Christodoulides and Greek Prime Minister Kyriakos Mitsotakis.	
Belgium	Brussels	18–19 March	Macron attended the European Council.	
Japan	Tokyo	31 March–2 April	Macron paid an official visit to Japan. He met with Emperor Naruhito and had a working dinner with Prime Minister Sanae Takaichi.	
South Korea	Seoul	2–3 April	Macron paid a state visit to South Korea at the invitation of President Lee Jae Myung. The visit comes as South Korea and France celebrate the 140th anniversary of their diplomatic relations. It was the first visit by a French president in 11 years.	
Vatican City	Vatican City	9–10 April	Macron met with Pope Leo XIV.	
Poland	Gdańsk	20 April	Macron met with Prime Minister Donald Tusk.	
Cyprus	Nicosia	23–24 April	Macron attended an informal meeting of the European Council.	
Greece	Athens	24–25 April	Macron met with President Konstantinos Tasoulas and Prime Minister Kyriakos Mitsotakis.	
Andorra	Andorra la Vella	27–28 April	Macron travelled to Andorra in his capacity as Co-Prince of the Principality. He met with the other Co-Prince, Bishop Josep-Lluis Serrano Pentinat of Urgell, and Prime Minister Xavier Espot Zamora.	
Armenia	Yerevan, Gyumri	3–5 May	Macron attended the 8th European Political Community Summit after which he paid a state visit and met with President Vahagn Khachaturyan and Prime Minister Nikol Pashinyan.	
Egypt	Alexandria	9 May	Macron met with President Abdel Fattah al-Sisi and inaugurated Senghor University’s new campus, a Francophone institution.	
Kenya	Nairobi	10–12 May	Macron met with President William Ruto and attended the Africa Forward summit.	
Ethiopia	Addis Ababa	13 May	Macron met with Prime Minister Abiy Ahmed and UN Secretary General Antonio Guterres.	
Montenegro	Cetinje, Tivat	4–5 June	Macron paid an official visit to Montenegro. He met with President Jakov Milatović before attending the EU–Western Balkans Summit. He is the first French president to visit Montenegro.	
United Kingdom	London	7 June	Macron met with Prime Minister Keir Starmer, Ukrainian President Volodymyr Zelenskyy, and German Chancelor Friedrich Merz to discuss support for Ukraine.	
Belgium	Brussels	18–19 June	Macron attended the European Council.	
Germany	Berlin	24 June	Macron attended an E5 meeting with Chancellor Friedrich Merz, British Prime Minister Keir Starmer, Italian Prime Minister Giorgia Meloni, and Polish Prime Minister Donald Tusk, focused on preparation for the upcoming NATO summit.	
Syria	Damascus	6–7 July	Macron paid the first visit by a head of state from a Western power since the 2024 ousting of Bashar al-Assad and the first visit by a French president since Nicolas Sarkozy in 2009.	
Turkey	Ankara	7–8 July	Macron attended the 2026 Ankara NATO summit.	
Germany	Brühl	16–17 July	Macron met with Chancellor Friedrich Merz and attended the 26th Franco-German Ministerial Council.	
Sweden	Stockholm	31 August	Macron met with Prime Minister Ulf Kristersson. Both leaders boarded the new French frigate Amiral Ronarc'h to participate in a signing ceremony, including the official signing of Sweden's acquisition of four defense and intervention frigates from France's Naval Group.	
Netherlands	Eindhoven	2 September	Macron visited ASML headquarters and held talks with Dutch Prime Minister Rob Jetten regarding the strengthening of Europe's technological and industrial sovereignty.	
United Kingdom	London	2–3 September	Macron participated in an audience with King Charles III and attended the official opening of the Bayeux Tapestry exhibition at the British Museum. He also held a bilateral meeting with Prime Minister Andy Burnham at Downing Street.	
United States	New York City	21–23 September	Macron attended the 81th United Nations General Assembly. He also met with US President Donald Trump and Ukrainian President Volodymyr Zelenskyy.	
Spain	Madrid	29–30 September	Macron paid a state visit, the first by a French president since 2009. He met with King Felipe VI and Prime Minister Pedro Sánchez.	
Croatia	Split	7 October	Macron attended the 13th EU Med Summit.	
Belgium	Brussels	15–16 October	Macron attended the European Council.	
Kuwait	Kuwait City	19 October	Macron met with Emir Mishal Al-Ahmad Al-Jaber Al-Sabah at Bayan Palace. This is his first visit to Kuwait.	
United Arab Emirates	Abu Dhabi	19–20 October	Macron met with President Mohamed bin Zayed Al Nahyan at Qasr Al Watan. The two heads of state also visited defence manufacturers at Tawazun Industrial Park.	
Bahrain	Zallaq	20 October	Macron met with King Hamad bin Isa Al Khalifa at Al-Sakhir Palace. This is his first visit to Bahrain.	
Qatar	Doha	20–21 October	Macron paid a state visit. He met with Emir Tamim bin Hamad Al Thani at Lusail Palace and attended the One Planet Sovereign Wealth Funds.	
Saudi Arabia	Riyadh	21 October	Macron paid a surprise visit to meet with Crown Prince Mohammed bin Salman, becoming the first Western head of state to visit Saudi Arabia since the October 2026 Houthi attacks on Saudi Arabian airports.	
Ireland	Dublin	12–13 November	Macron attended the 9th European Political Community Summit and an informal European Council meeting of heads of state or government on AI.	
Cambodia	Phnom Penh, Siem Reap	14–16 November	Macron paid a state visit, the first by a French president since François Mitterrand in 1993. He met with King Norodom Sihamoni and Prime Minister Hun Manet. He also attended the 20th Organisation internationale de la Francophonie summit. To conclude his visit, Macron and King Norodom Sihamoni inaugurated the restored West Mebon temple at Angkor.	
Malaysia	Kuala Lumpur	16–17 November	Macron paid an official visit and met with Prime Minister Anwar Ibrahim. Several agreements have been signed to strengthen the bilateral relationship.	
Germany	Berlin	19 November	Macron attended a meeting of the Coalition of the willing (Russo-Ukrainian war).	

== Future trips ==
Country	Areas visited	Date(s)	Details
United States	Miami	14–15 December	Macron is scheduled to attend the 2026 G20 Miami summit.
Belgium	Brussels	17–18 December	Macron is scheduled to attend the European Council summit.

== Multilateral meetings ==
Multilateral meetings of the following intergovernmental organizations took place during Emmanuel Macron's presidency (2017–present).

Group	Year									
Group	2017	2018	2019	2020	2021	2022	2023	2024	2025	2026
UN GA	18–20 September, (United States) New York City	24–26 September, (United States) New York City	23–25 September, (United States) New York City	22 September, (United States) New York City (videoconference)	27 September,^{[a]} (United States) New York City	20 September, (United States) New York City	21 September,^{[b]} (United States) New York City	25 September, (United States) New York City	23 September, (United States) New York City	22 September, (United States) New York City
G7	26–27 May, (Italy) Taormina	8–9 June, (Canada) La Malbaie	24–26 August, (France) Biarritz	10–12 June, (United States) Camp David (cancelled)	11–13 June, (United Kingdom) Carbis Bay	26–28 June, (Germany) Schloss Elmau	19–21 May, (Japan) Hiroshima	13–15 June, (Italy) Apulia	16–17 June, (Canada) Kananaskis	15–17 June, (France) Évian-les-Bains
G20	7–8 July, (Germany) Hamburg	30 November–1 December, (Argentina) Buenos Aires	28–29 June, (Japan) Osaka	21–22 November, (Saudi Arabia) Riyadh (videoconference)	30–31 October, (Italy) Rome	15–16 November, (Indonesia) Bali	9–10 September, (India) New Delhi	18–19 November, (Brazil) Rio de Janeiro	22–23 November, (South Africa) Johannesburg	14–15 December, (United States) Miami
NATO	25 May, (Belgium) Brussels	11–12 July, (Belgium) Brussels	3–4 December, (United Kingdom) Watford	none	14 June, (Belgium) Brussels	24 March, (Belgium) Brussels	11–12 July, (Lithuania) Vilnius	9–11 July, (United States) Washington	24–25 June, (Netherlands) The Hague	7–8 July, (Turkey) Ankara
NATO	25 May, (Belgium) Brussels	11–12 July, (Belgium) Brussels	3–4 December, (United Kingdom) Watford	none	14 June, (Belgium) Brussels	28–30 June, (Spain) Madrid	11–12 July, (Lithuania) Vilnius	9–11 July, (United States) Washington	24–25 June, (Netherlands) The Hague	7–8 July, (Turkey) Ankara
COP	15 November, (Germany) Bonn	2 December–15 December, (Poland) Katowice	2 December–15 December, (Spain) Madrid	none	1 November, (United Kingdom) Glasgow	7 November, (Egypt) Sharm el-Sheikh	1 December, (United Arab Emirates) Dubai	11 November–22 November, (Azerbaijan) Baku	6 November, (Brazil) Belém	9 November–20 November, (Turkey) Antalya
EPC	Didn't exist					6 October, (Czech Republic) Prague	1 June, (Moldova) Bulboaca	18 July, (United Kingdom) Woodstock	16 May, (Albania) Tirana	4 May, (Armenia) Yerevan
EPC	Didn't exist					6 October, (Czech Republic) Prague	5 October, (Spain) Granada	7 November, (Hungary) Budapest	2 October, (Denmark) Copenhagen	12 November, (Republic of Ireland) Dublin
MED7/9		10 January, (Italy) Rome	29 January, (Cyprus) Nicosia	10 September, (France) Porticcio	17 September, (Greece) Athens	9 December, (Spain) Alicante	29 September, (Malta) Mdina	11 October, (Cyprus) Paphos	20 October, (Slovenia) Portorož	7 October, (Croatia) Split
MED7/9		10 January, (Italy) Rome	14 June, (Malta) Valletta	10 September, (France) Porticcio	17 September, (Greece) Athens	9 December, (Spain) Alicante	29 September, (Malta) Mdina	11 October, (Cyprus) Paphos	20 October, (Slovenia) Portorož	7 October, (Croatia) Split
OIF	none	11–12 October, (Armenia) Yerevan	none	none	none	19–20 November, (Tunisia) Djerba	none	4–5 October, (France) Villers-Cotterêts	none	15–16 November, (Cambodia) Phnom Penh
EP	24 November, (Belgium) Brussels	none	none	none	15 December, (Belgium) Brussels	none	none	none	none	none
ASEM	none	18–19 October, (Belgium) Brussels	none	none	21–22 November, (Cambodia) Phnom Penh (videoconference)	none	none	none	none	none
EU–CELAC	26–27 October, (El Salvador) San Salvador	none	none	none	none	none	17–18 July, (Belgium) Brussels	none	9–10 November, (Colombia) Santa Marta	none
EU	22–23 June, 19–20 October, 14–15 December, (Belgium) Brussels	23 February, 22–23 March, 28–29 June, 17–18 October, 25 November, 13–14 December, (Belgium) Brussels	21–22 March, 10 April, 20–21 June, 30 June – 2 July, 17–18 October, 12–13 December, (Belgium) Brussels	10 March (videoconference); 17 March (videoconference), 26 March (videoconference), 23 April (videoconference), 19 June (videoconference), 15–16 October, 10–11 December, (Belgium) Brussels	24–25 May, 24–25 June, 21–22 October, 16 December, (Belgium) Brussels	24–25 March, 23–24 June, 20–21 October, 15 December, (Belgium) Brussels	23–24 March, 29–30 June, 26–27 October, 14–15 December, (Belgium) Brussels	21–22 March, 27–28 June, 16–17 October, 18 December, (Belgium) Brussels	20–21 March, 26–27 June, 23 October, 18–19 December, (Belgium) Brussels	18–19 March, 18–19 June, (Belgium) Brussels
Euro summit	15 December, (Belgium) Brussels	23 March, 29 June, 18 October, 14 December, (Belgium) Brussels	21 June, 13 December, (Belgium) Brussels	11 December, (Belgium) Brussels	25 March (videoconference), 25 June, 16 December, (Belgium) Brussels	24 June, (Belgium) Brussels	24 March, 27 October (Belgium) Brussels	22 March, (Belgium) Brussels		
North Sea Summit	Didn't exist					18 May, (Denmark) Esbjerg	24 April, (Belgium) Ostend	none	none	26 January, (Germany) Hamburg
Others	none	none	Normandy Format; 9 December, (France); Paris	none	none	none	Coronation of King Charles III and Queen Camilla; 5–6 May, (United Kingdom) London	Global Peace Summit; 15–16 June, (Switzerland) Lucerne	Securing our future 2 March, (United Kingdom) London	Together for peace and security summit 6 January, (France) Paris
Others	none	none	Normandy Format; 9 December, (France); Paris	none	none	none	Coronation of King Charles III and Queen Camilla; 5–6 May, (United Kingdom) London	Global Peace Summit; 15–16 June, (Switzerland) Lucerne	15 March, (videoconference); United Kingdom	Determined to act 13 July, (France) Paris
Others	none	none	Normandy Format; 9 December, (France); Paris	none	none	none	Coronation of King Charles III and Queen Camilla; 5–6 May, (United Kingdom) London	Global Peace Summit; 15–16 June, (Switzerland) Lucerne	Building a robust peace for Ukraine and Europe; 27 March, (France) Paris	Determined to act 13 July, (France) Paris
██ = Did not attend; ██ = Future event.^aForeign Minister Jean-Yves Le Drian attended in the President's place.^bForeign Minister Catherine Colonna attended in the President's place.

== See also ==
- Foreign relations of France
- List of international trips made by presidents of France
- List of presidential trips made by Emmanuel Macron
- List of international presidential trips made by François Hollande, his predecessor
