= 43rd G7 summit =

2017 international leader meeting in Italy

Coordinates: 34°18′30″N 136°49′7″E

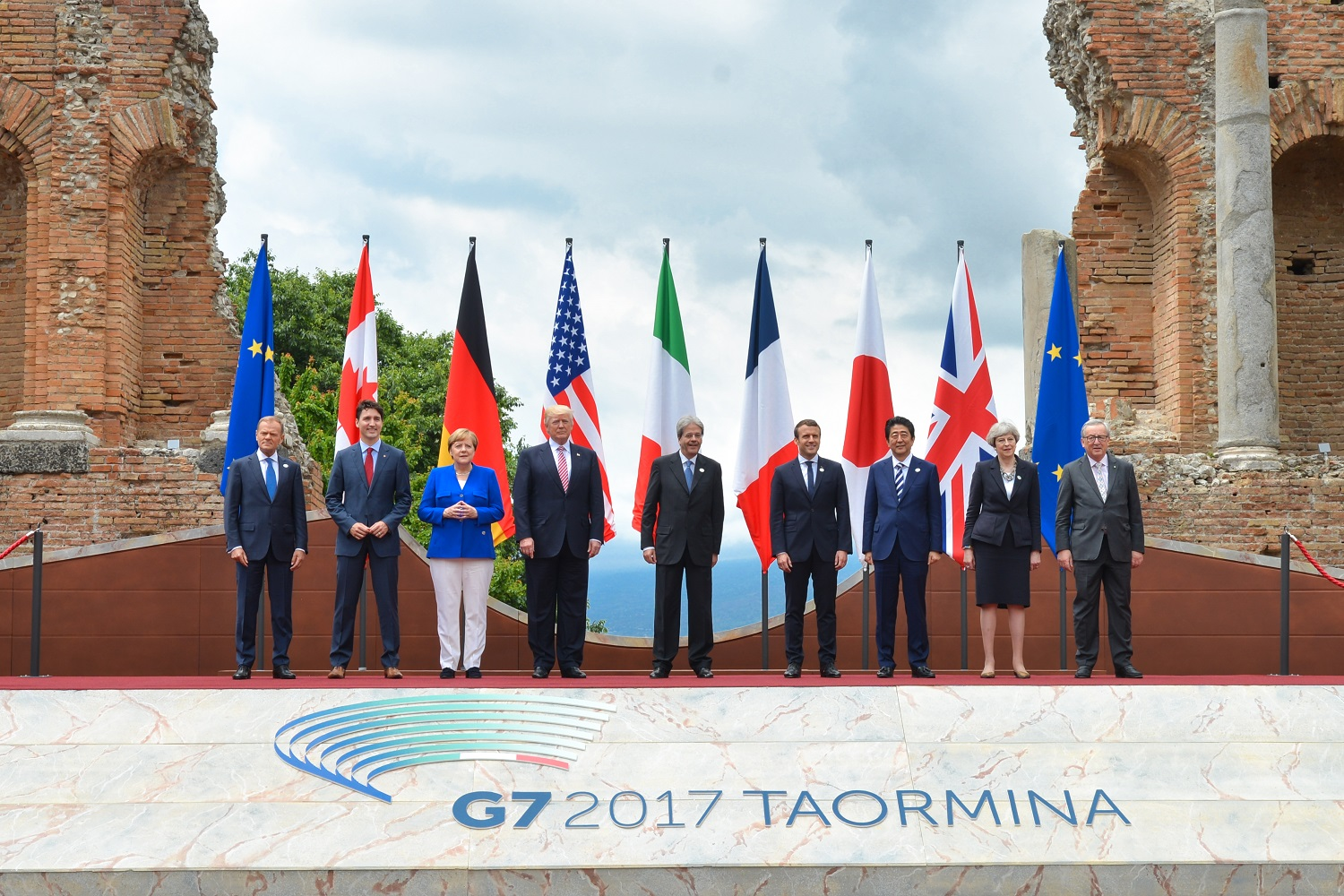
- Host country: Italy
- Date: 26–27 May 2017
- Cities: Taormina
- Venues: Palazzo dei Congressi
- Participants: Canada; France; Germany; Italy; Japan; United Kingdom; United States; European Union; Invited guests: Ethiopia; Guinea; Kenya; Niger; Nigeria; Tunisia
- Follows: 42nd G7 summit
- Precedes: 44th G7 summit
- Website: www.g7italy.it/en

The 43rd G7 summit was held on 26–27 May 2017 in Taormina (ME), Sicily, Italy. In March 2014, the G7 declared that a meaningful discussion was currently not possible with Russia in the context of the G8. Since then, meetings have continued within the G7 process.

It was the first time since 1987 that the G7 summit held in Italy was not hosted by Silvio Berlusconi. The participation of Angela Merkel and Theresa May made it the first time two G7 female leaders were principals in the G7 summit.

The choice of Taormina as the headquarters of the G7 was announced by then Prime Minister Matteo Renzi on 4 July 2016. The summit was initially scheduled to take place in Florence. Among the reasons for the change of choice, Renzi cited the words of an international leader at a previous summit that with a joke had highlighted his prejudice against Sicily pointing out as the land of the Mafia and claimed that those words had convinced him to fix the G7 in Sicily.

== Leaders at the summit ==
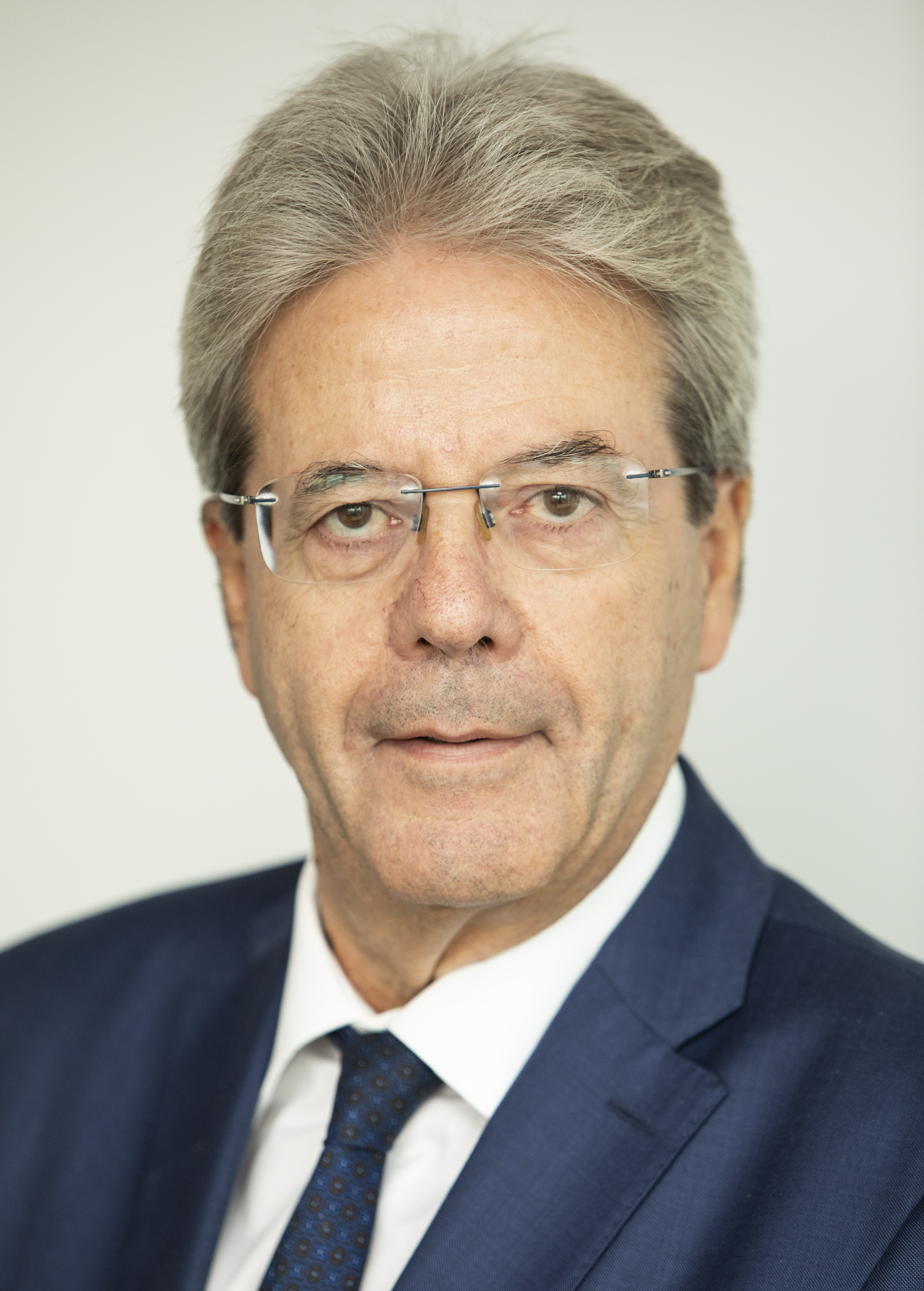
Paolo Gentiloni chaired the 43rd G7 summit.

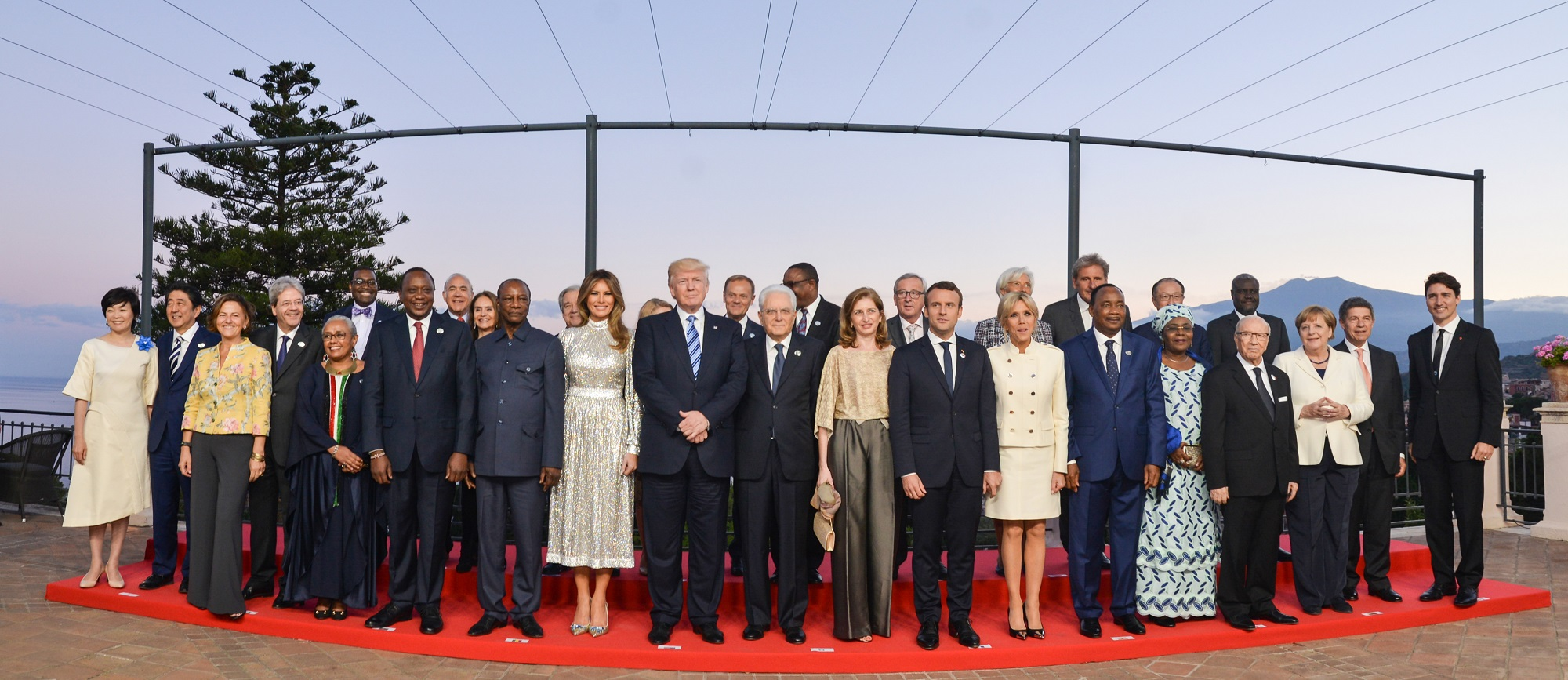
Official photo of the dinner with the President of Italy

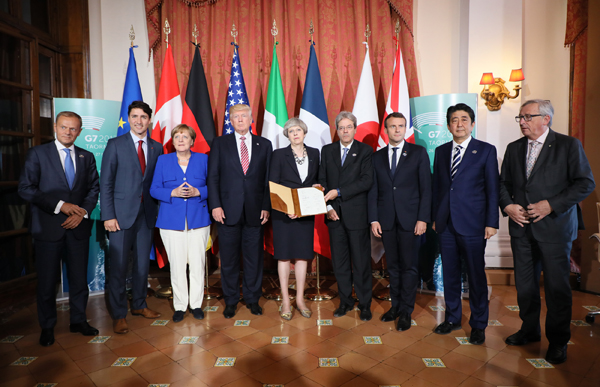
G7 leaders after signing the statement on the fight against terrorism and violent extremism on 27 May 2017. The document was signed just a few days after the Manchester Arena bombing

The attendees include the leaders of the seven G7 member states as well as representatives of the European Union. The President of the European Commission has been a consistent participant at all meetings and decision-making since 1981.

The 43rd G7 summit was the first summit for British Prime Minister Theresa May, French President Emmanuel Macron, and US President Donald Trump. It was also the first and only summit for Italian Prime Minister Paolo Gentiloni.

=== Participants ===
**Core G7 members** Host state and leader are shown in bold text.
Member		Represented by	Title
(Canada)	Canada	Justin Trudeau	Prime Minister
(France)	France	Emmanuel Macron	President
(Germany)	Germany	Angela Merkel	Chancellor
(Italy)	**Italy**	**Paolo Gentiloni**	**Prime Minister**
(Japan)	Japan	Shinzō Abe	Prime Minister
(United Kingdom)	United Kingdom	Theresa May	Prime Minister
(United States)	United States	Donald Trump	President
(European Union)	European Union	Jean-Claude Juncker	Commission President
(European Union)	European Union	Donald Tusk	Council President
**Guest Invitees (Countries)**
Member		Represented by	Title
(Ethiopia)	Ethiopia	Hailemariam Desalegn	Prime Minister
(Guinea)	Guinea	Alpha Conde	President
(Kenya)	Kenya	Uhuru Kenyatta	President
(Niger)	Niger	Mahamadou Issoufou	President
(Nigeria)	Nigeria	Yemi Osinbajo	Acting President
(Tunisia)	Tunisia	Beji Caid Essebsi	President

== Agenda ==
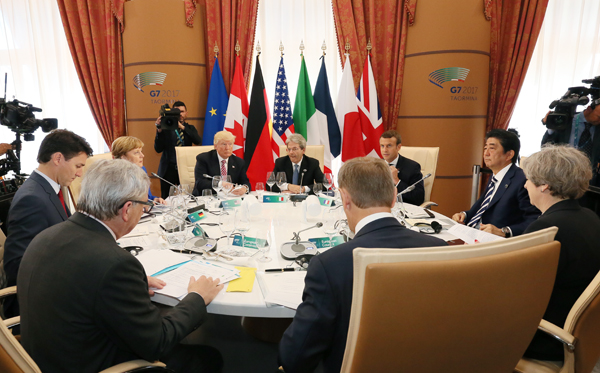
Working session on 26 May 2017

The G7 leaders emphasized common endeavours: to end the Syrian crisis, to fulfill the UN mission in Libya and reducing the presence of ISIS, ISIL and Da'esh in Syria and Iraq. North Korea was urged to comply with UN resolutions, Russian responsibility was stressed for the war in Ukraine. Supporting economic activity and ensuring price stability was demanded while inequalities in trade and gender were called to be challenged. It was agreed to help countries in creating conditions that address the drivers of migration: ending hunger, increasing competitiveness and advancing global health security.

== Gallery of participating leaders ==
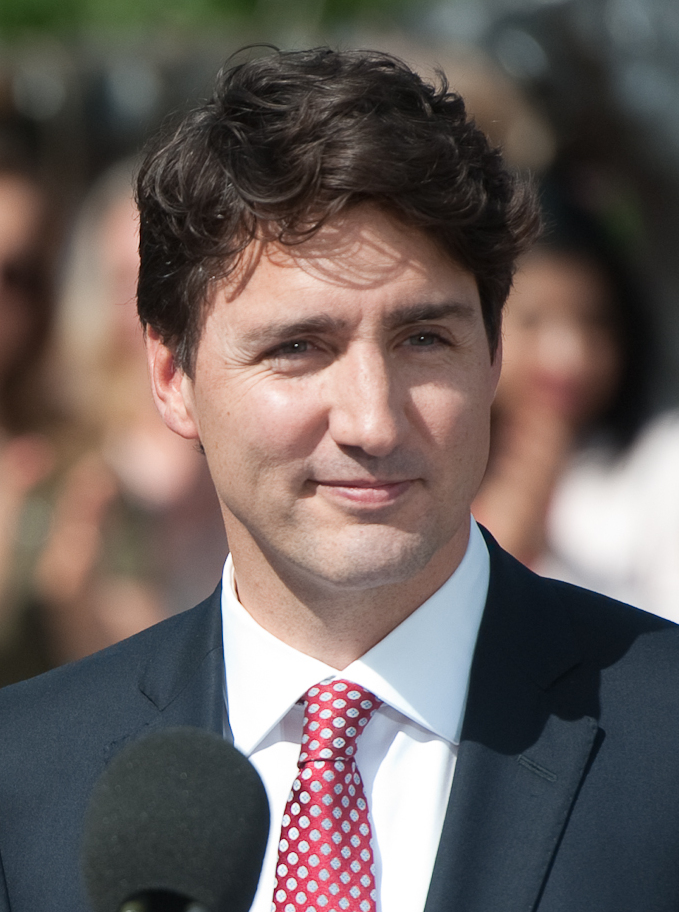
(Canada) Canada
Justin Trudeau,
Prime Minister

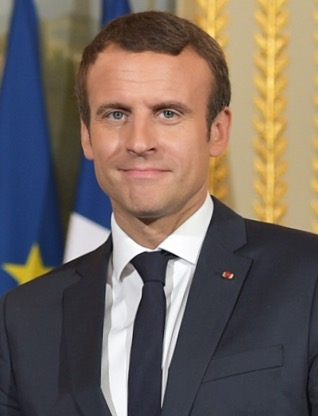
(France) France
Emmanuel Macron,
President

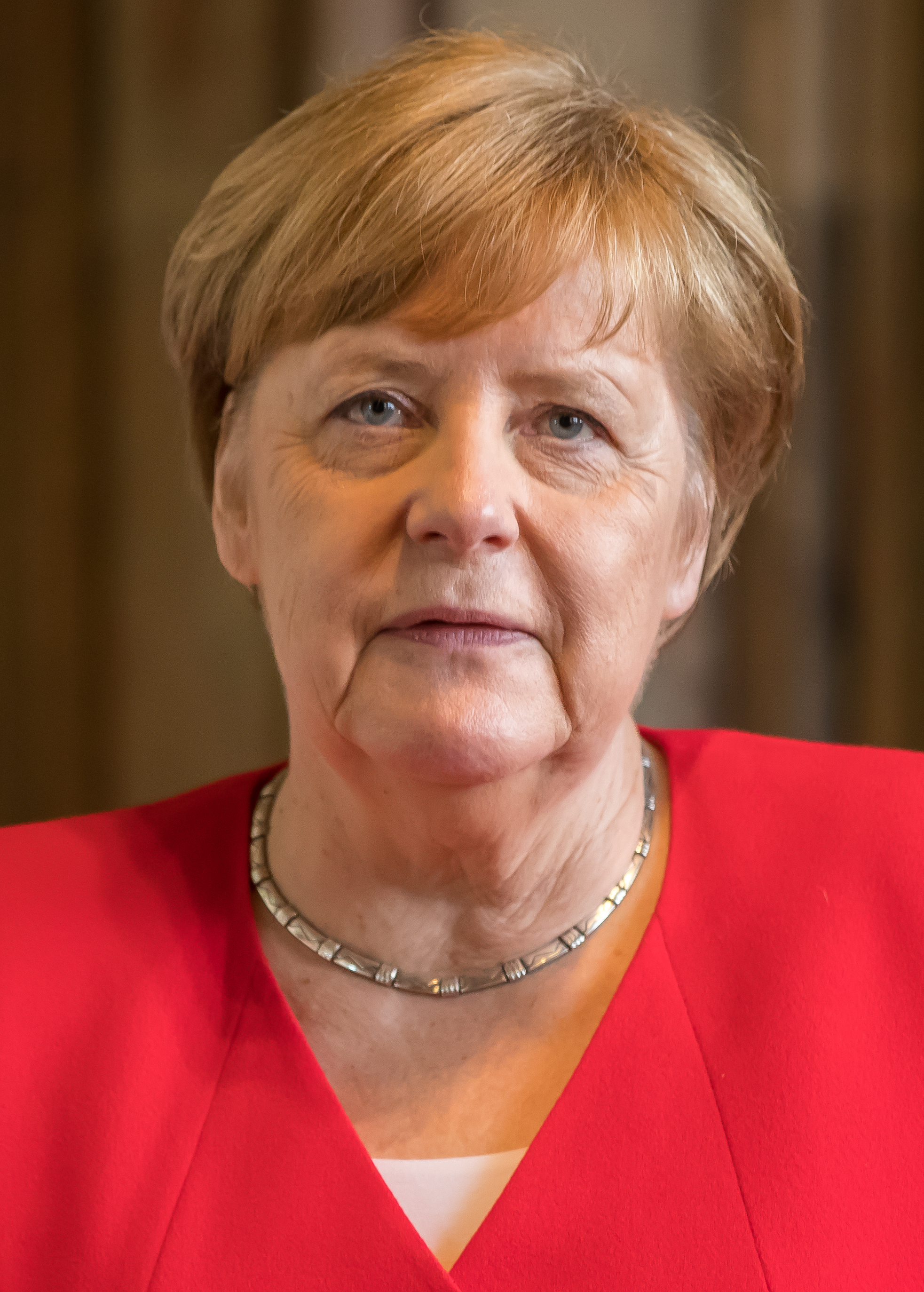
(Germany) Germany
Angela Merkel,
Chancellor

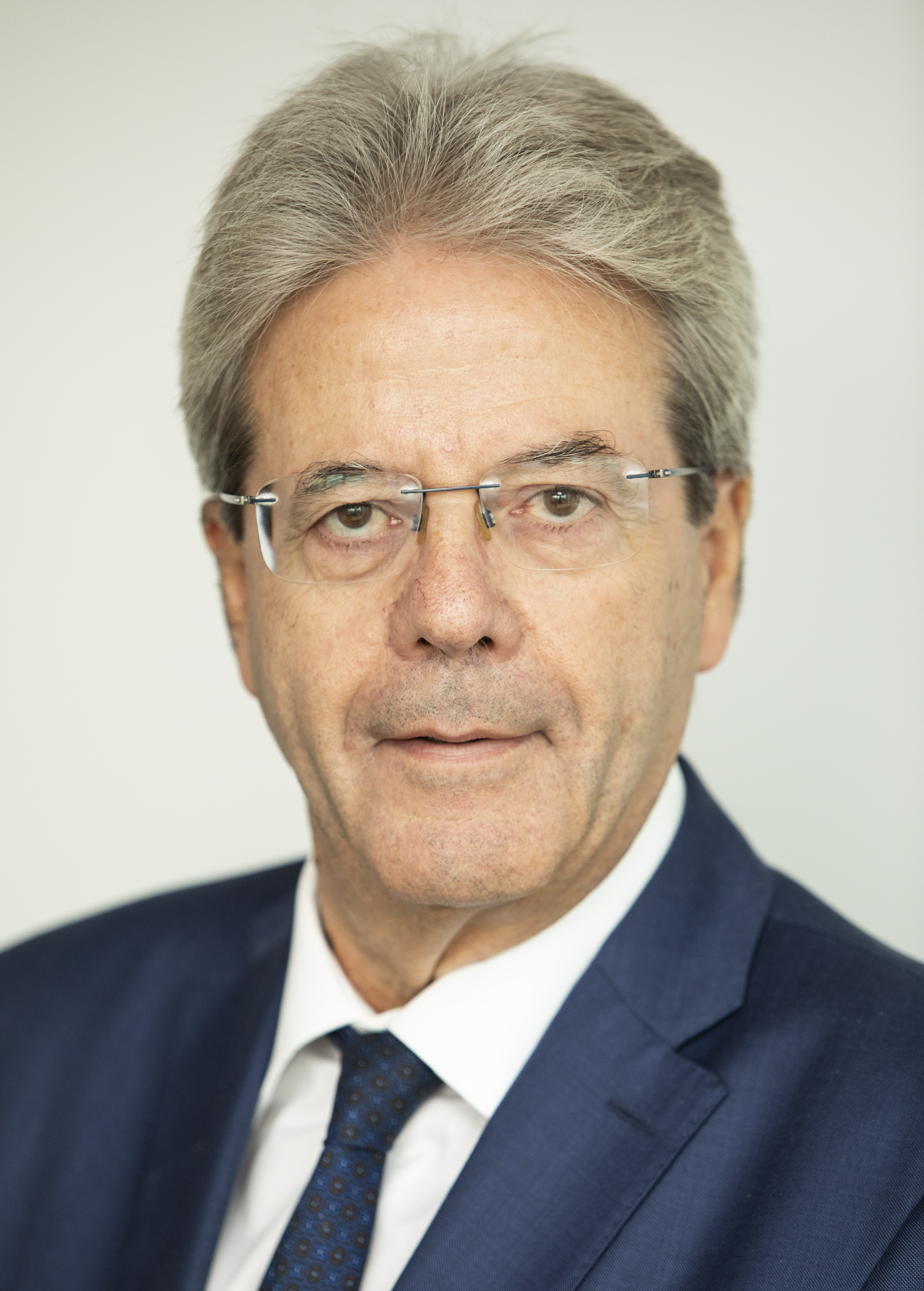
(Italy) Italy
Paolo Gentiloni,
Prime Minister (Host)

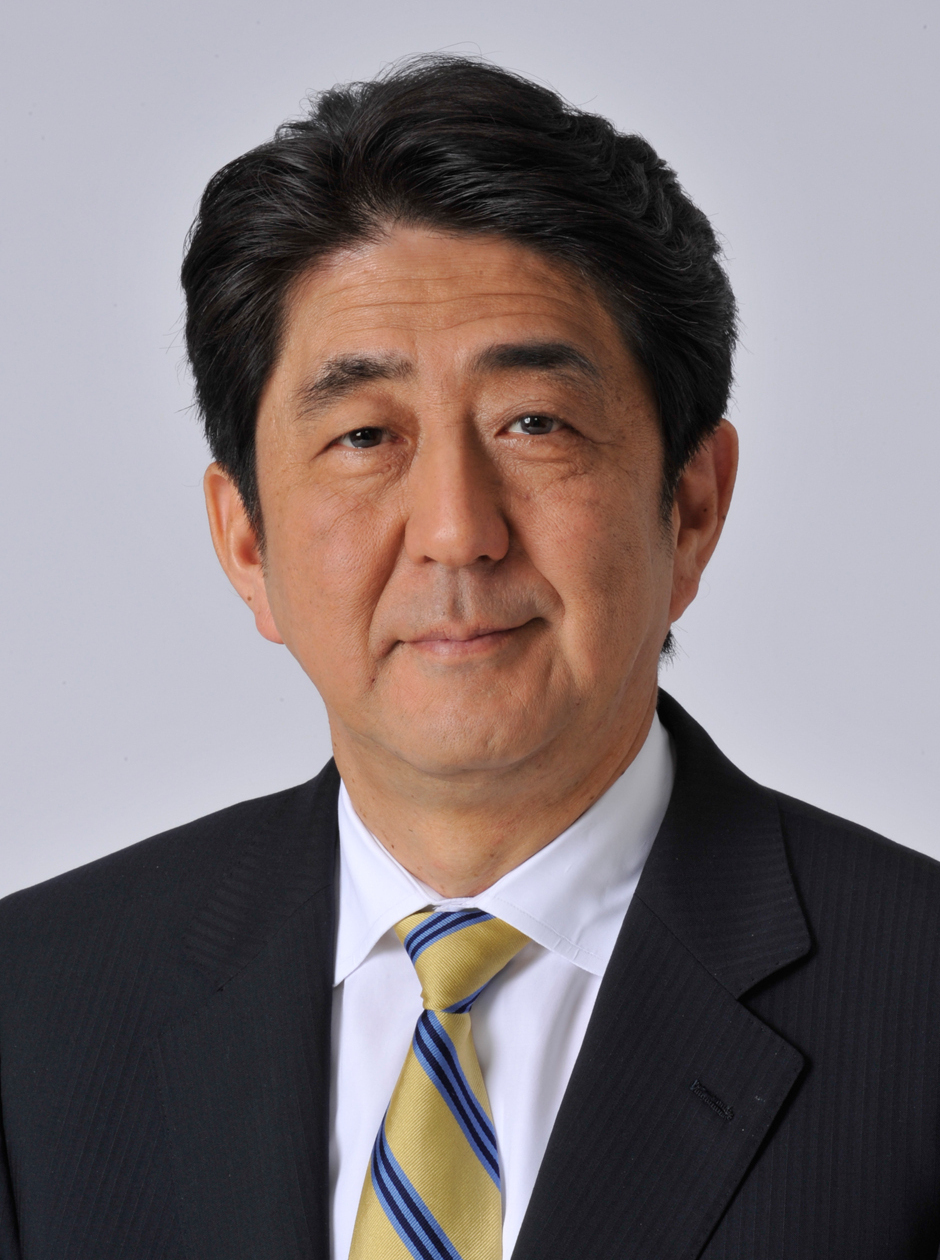
(Japan) Japan
Shinzō Abe,
Prime Minister

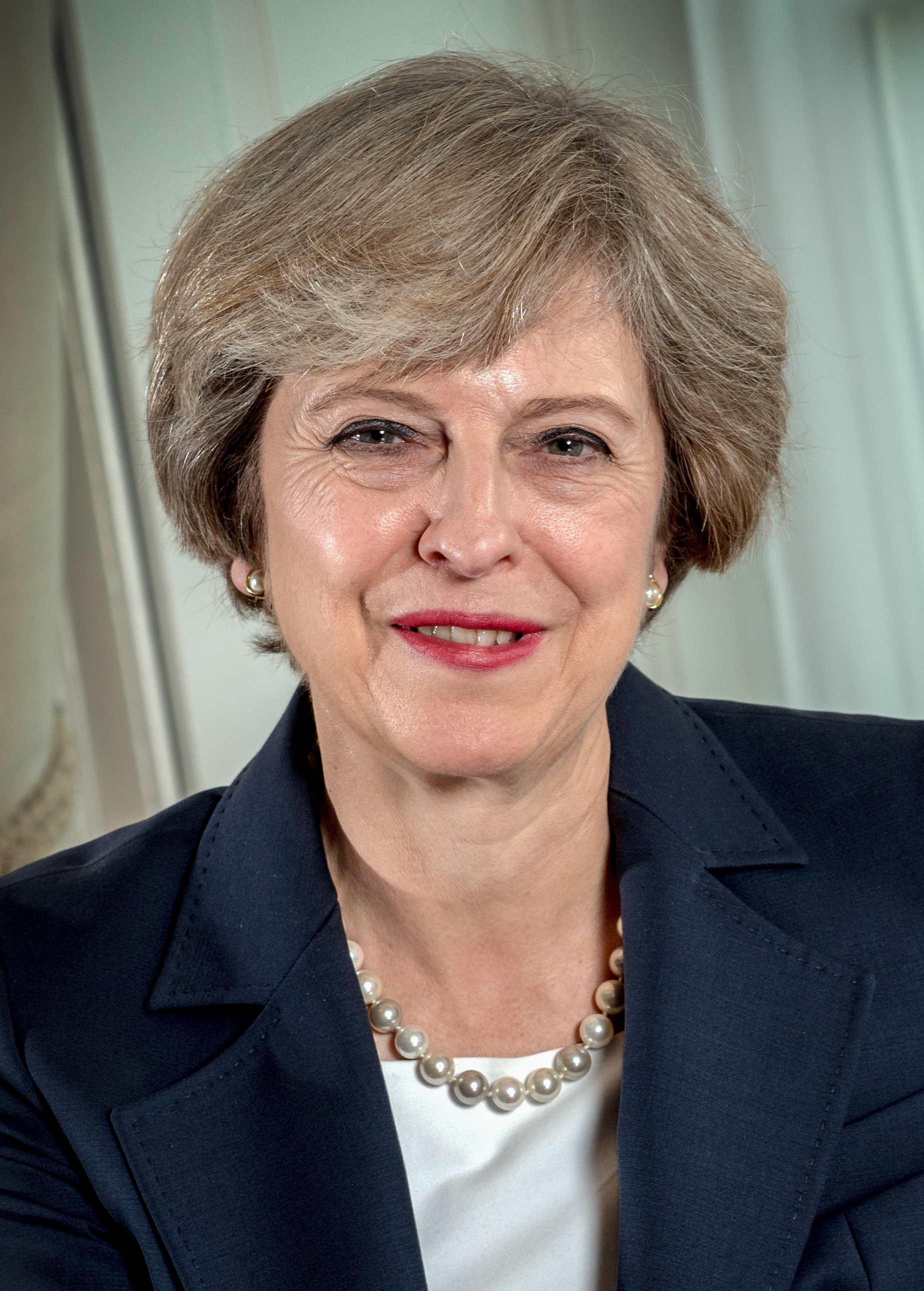
(United Kingdom) United Kingdom
Theresa May,
Prime Minister

(United States) United States
Donald Trump,
President
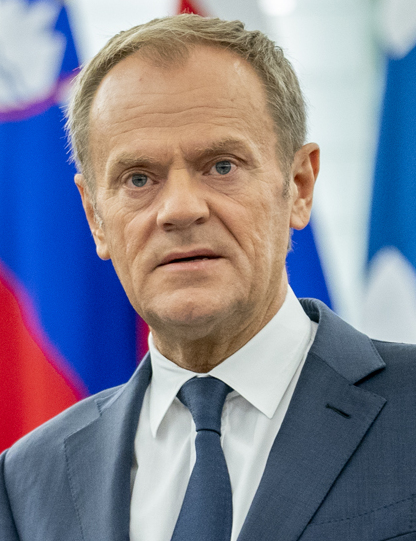
(European Union) European Union
Donald Tusk,
Council President

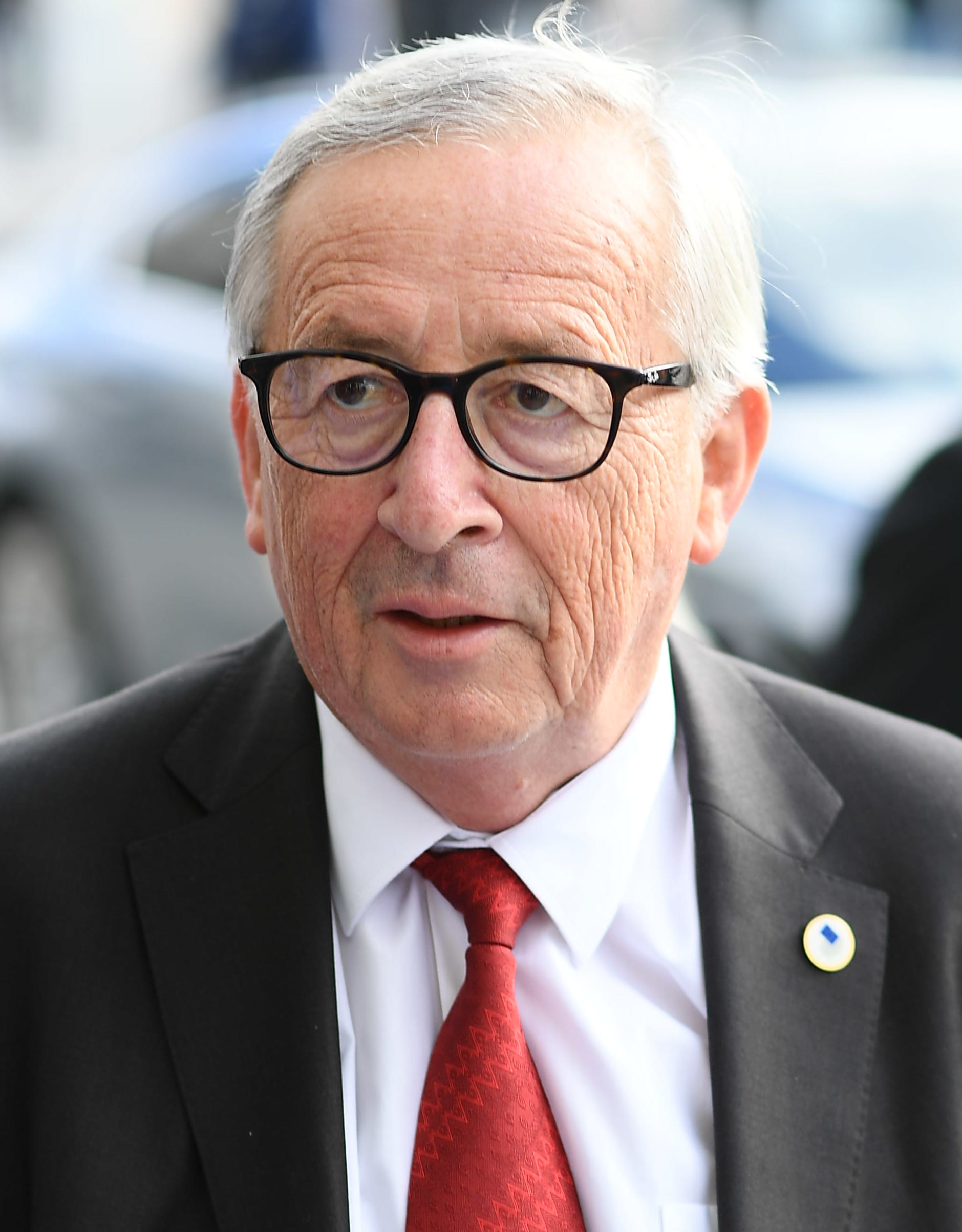
(European Union) European Union
Jean-Claude Juncker,
Commission President

=== Invited guests ===
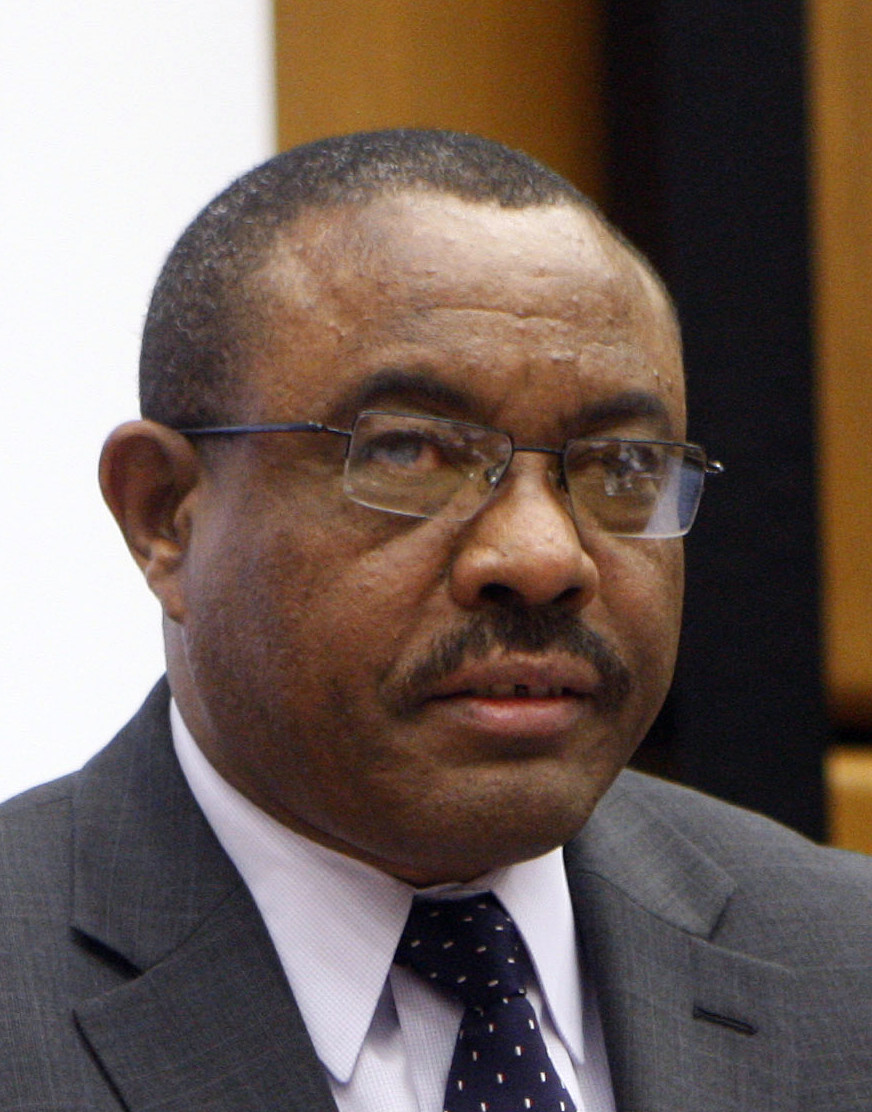
Ethiopia
Hailemariam Desalegn,
Prime Minister

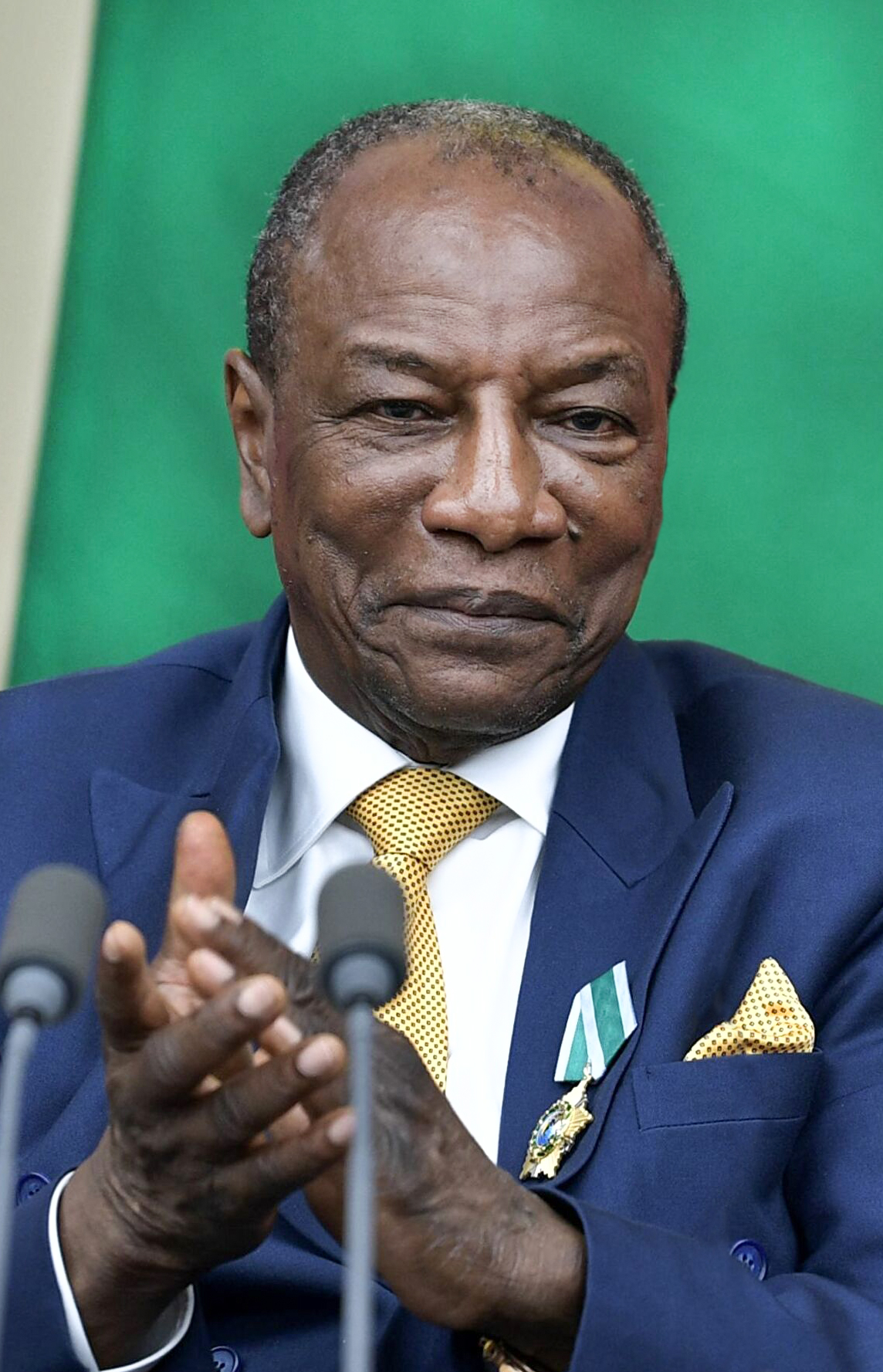
Guinea
Alpha Conde,
President

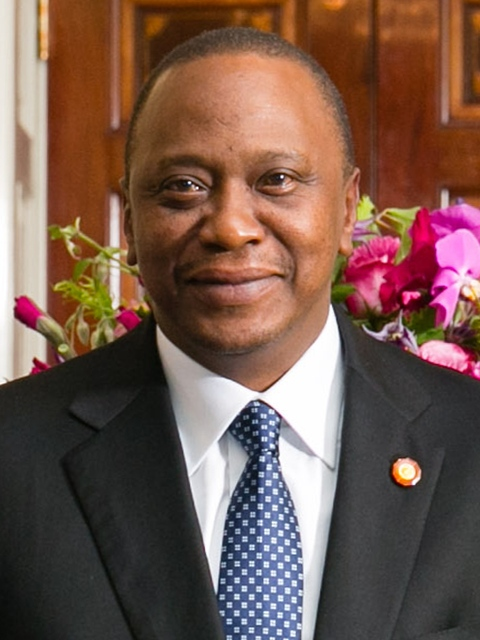
(Kenya) Kenya
Uhuru Kenyatta,
President

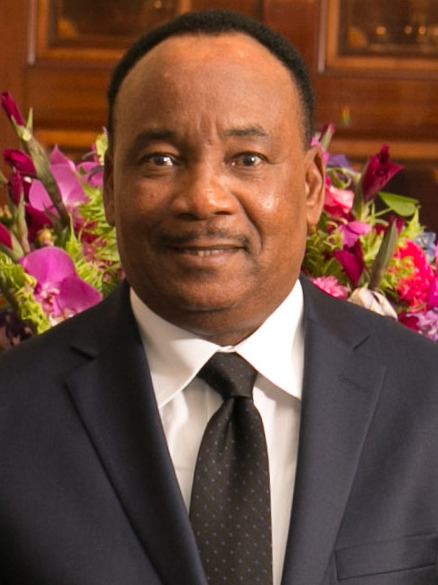
Niger
Mahamadou Issoufou,
President

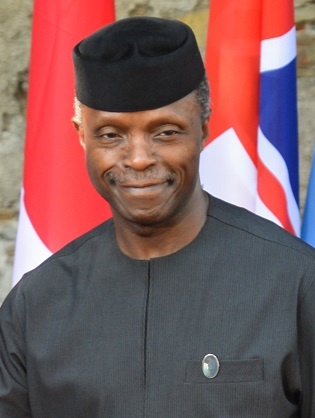
Nigeria
Yemi Osinbajo,
Acting President

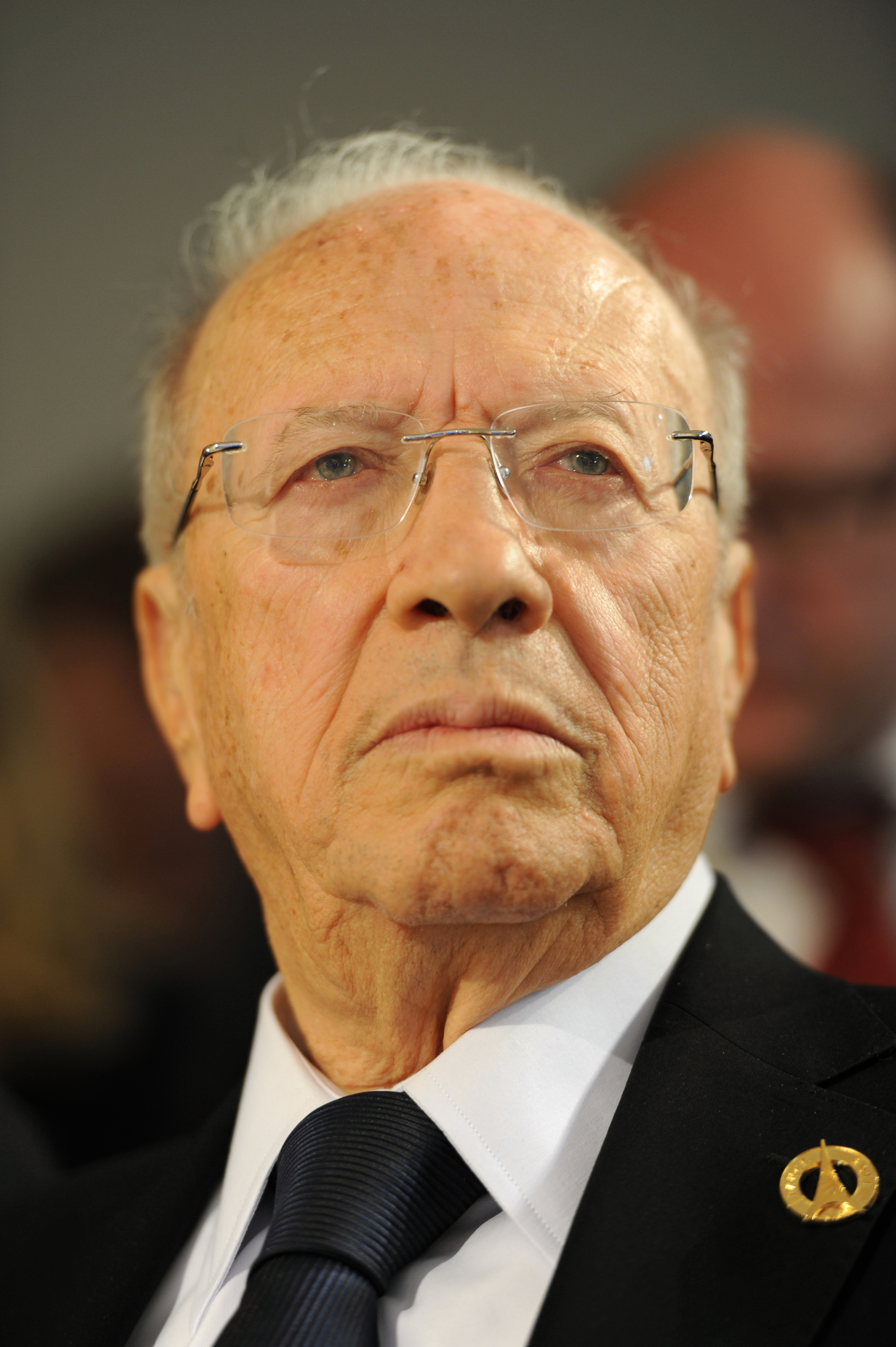
Tunisia
Beji Caid Essebsi,
President

=== International organizations ===
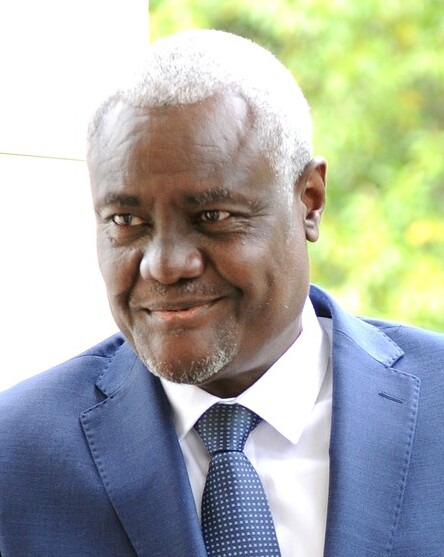
African Union
Moussa Faki,
Commission Chair

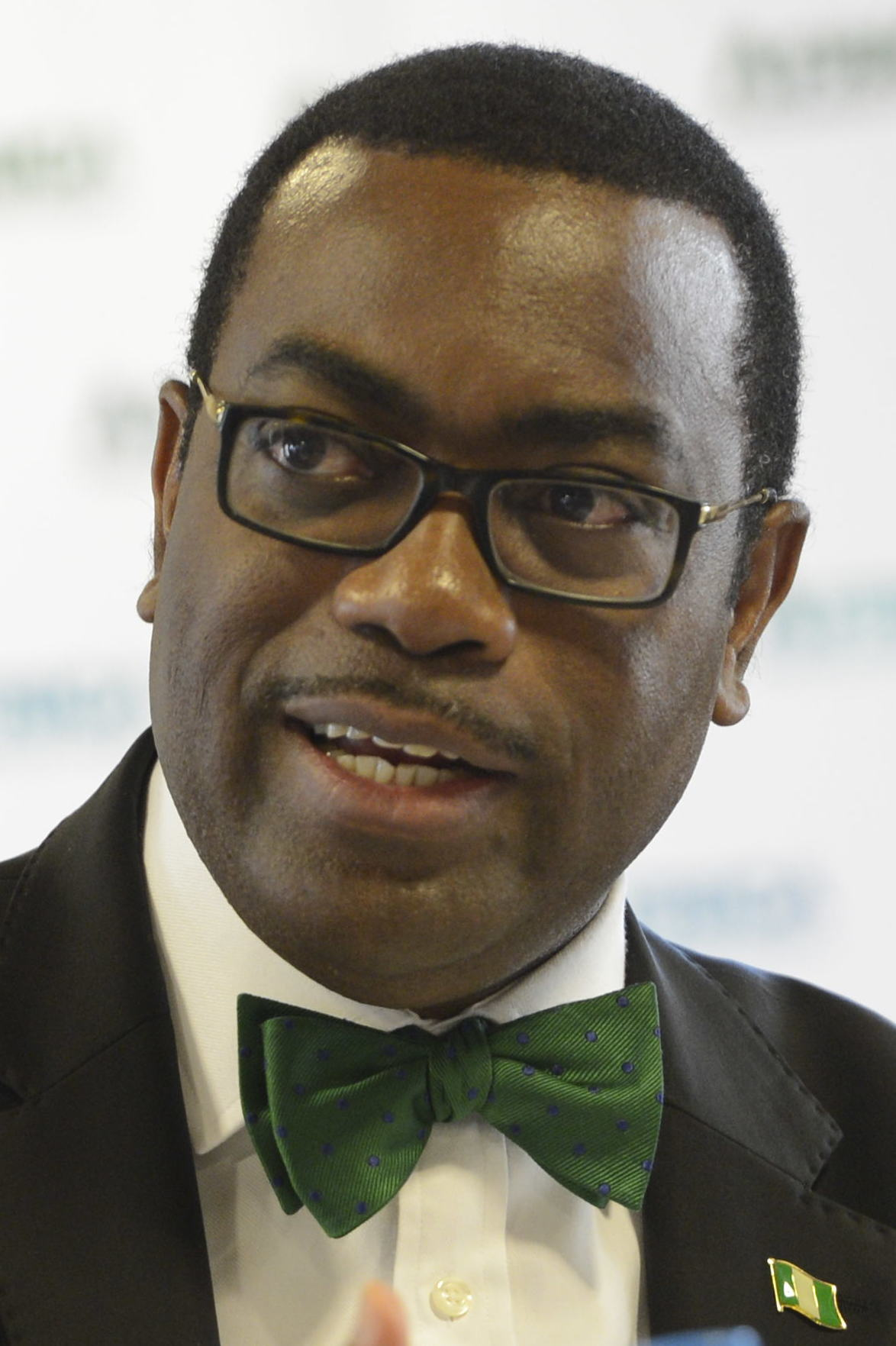
African Development Bank
Akinwumi Adesina,
President

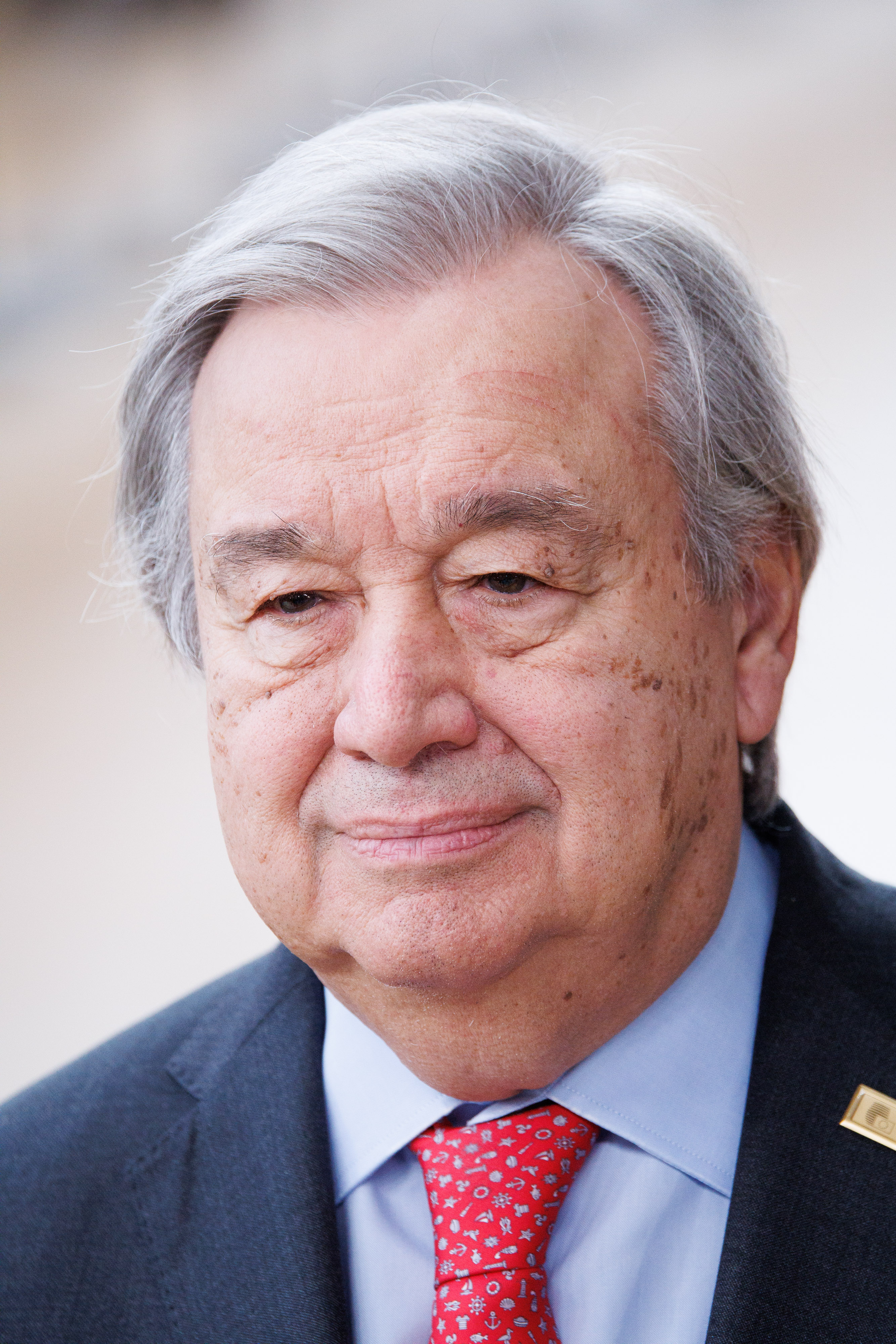
United Nations
António Guterres,
Secretary-General

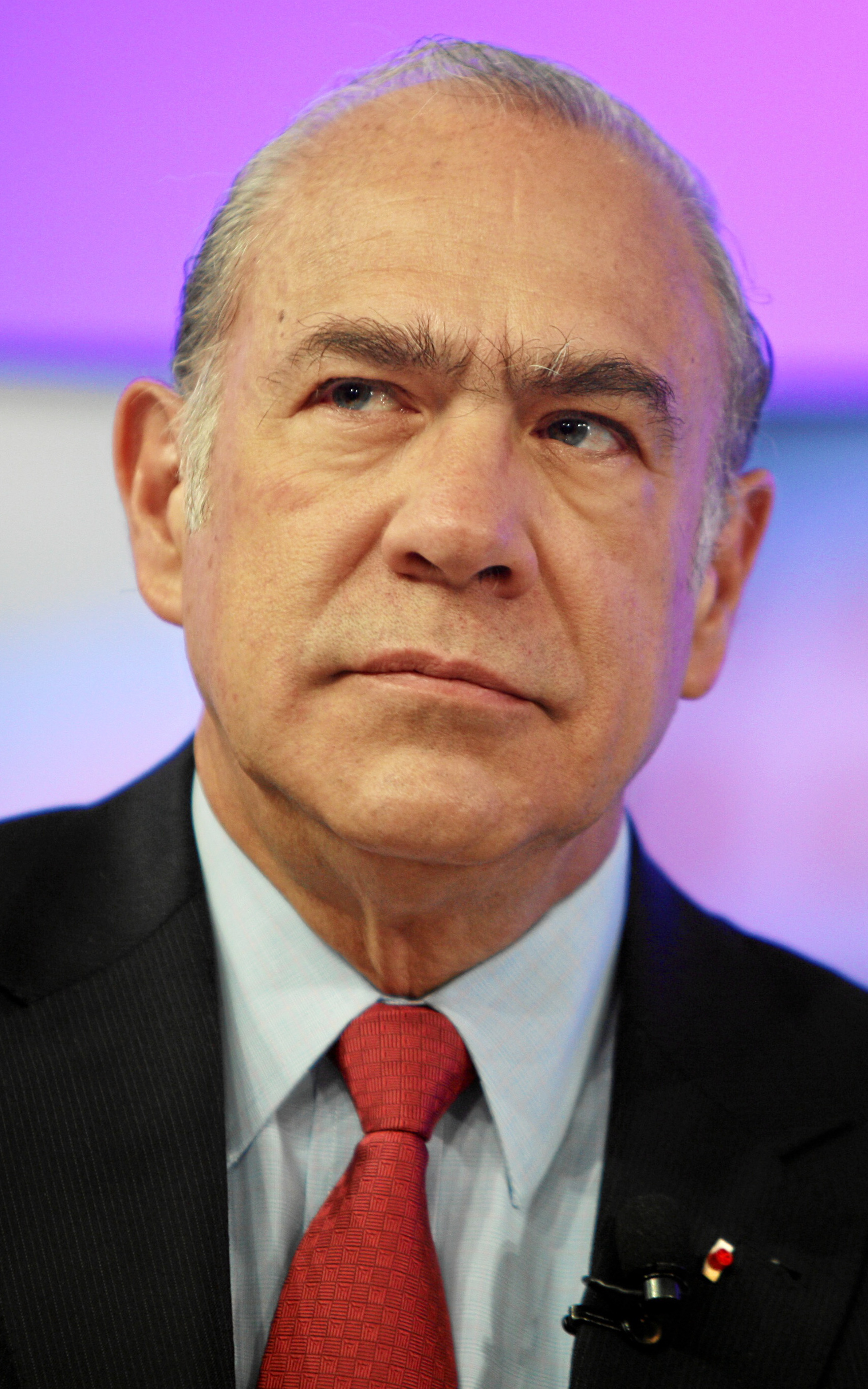
OECD
José Ángel Gurría,
Secretary-General

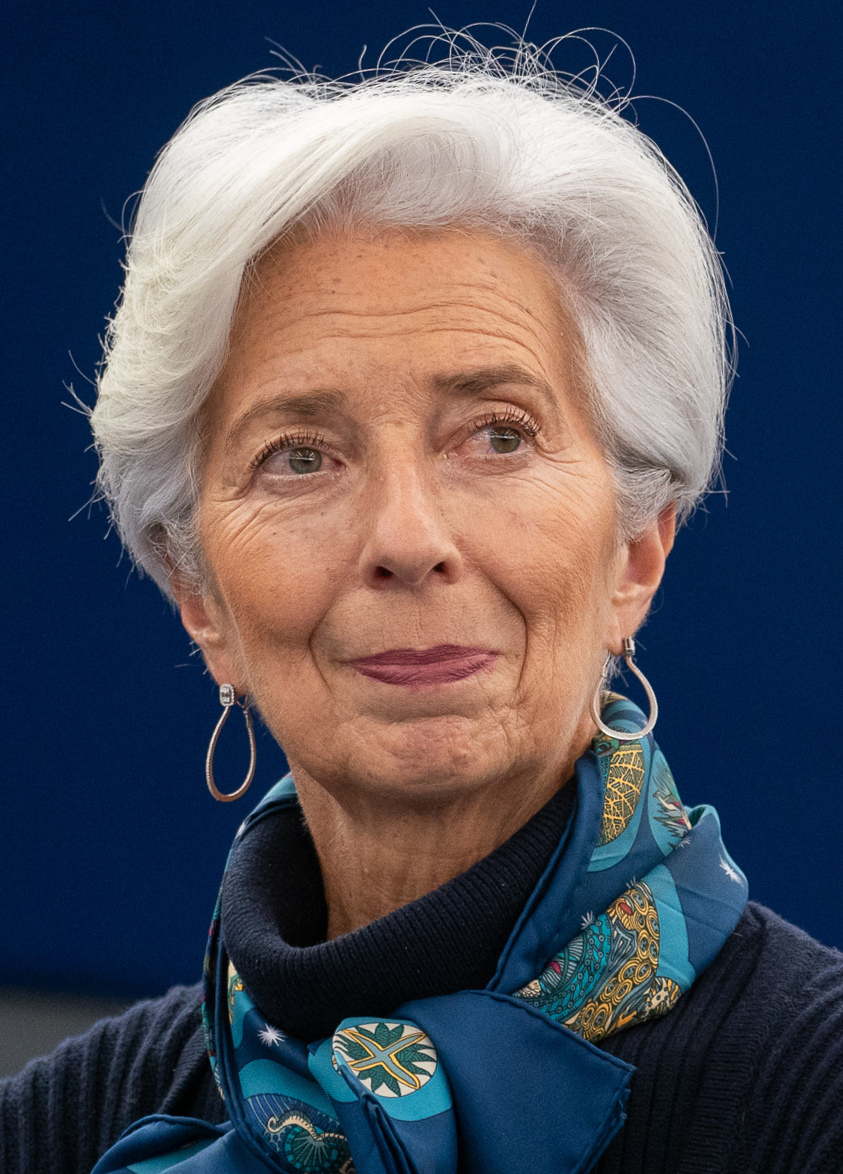
International Monetary Fund
Christine Lagarde,
managing director

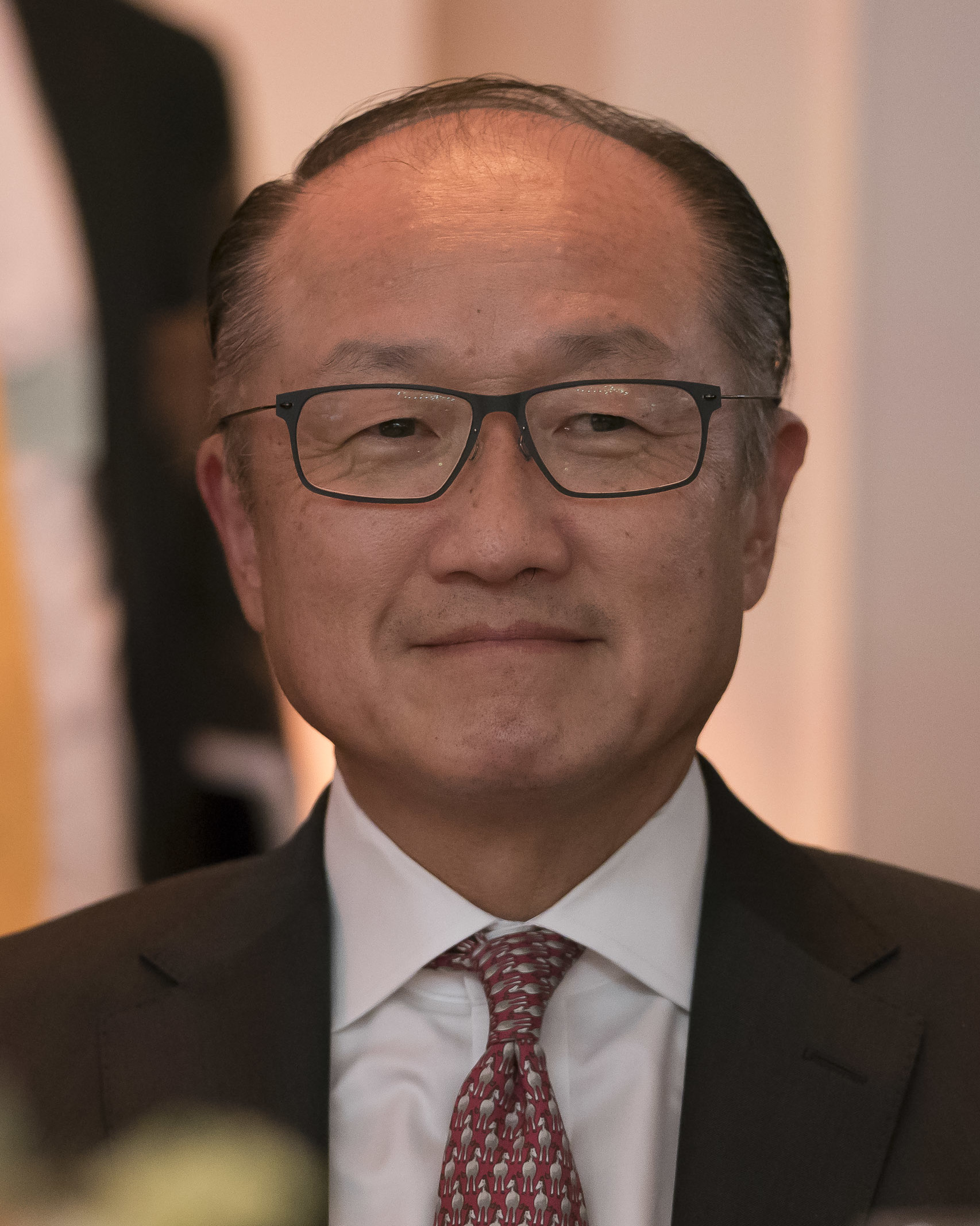
World Bank
Jim Yong Kim,
President

== See also ==
- G8
