= Yi Ming (artist) =

Chinese painter, calligrapher and designer

- 易茗
- Born: March 4, 1974 (age 52); Hubei, China
- Education: Central Academy of Drama
- Notable work: Olympic visual identity, Enigma, Auspicious Clouds
- Style: Oil painting, Ink painting, Calligraphy

Yi Ming (易茗; born 4 March 1974) is a Chinese painter, calligrapher and cross-disciplinary designer whose practice spans studio ink painting, oil painting, Olympic visual identity and cinematic art direction. His synthesis of traditional brushwork with contemporary graphic design has been commissioned for the 2008 Beijing Summer Olympics and the 2022 Beijing Winter Olympics, while his ink, oil paintings and calligraphy have entered public and private collections in China and abroad.

== Early life and education ==
Yi Ming grew up in Wuhan and mastered expressive ink lines by the age of ten. A mentor introduced him to classical calligraphic models such as Yi Bingshou. He moved to Beijing to study stage and image design at the Central Academy of Drama under professors Huo Qidi and Guo Shuyi.

== Career ==
=== Olympic and state commissions ===
Yi Ming was appointed chief image designer for the 2008 Beijing Summer Olympics, weaving auspicious-cloud motifs and kinetic brush forms into the Games' visual narrative. He reprised the role for the 2022 Beijing Winter Olympics, adapting icy palettes and fluid strokes to articulate themes of resilience and unity. Between the two Olympiads he served as chief stylist for the 2016 G20 Summit in Hangzhou and principal designer of the "Beijing Eight Minutes" cultural segment at the closing ceremony of the 2018 Winter Olympics.

=== Studio practice and reception ===
Alongside design work, Yi Ming maintains a studio practice in painting and calligraphy. His oil painting Enigma realised ¥1.288 million and Auspicious Clouds fetched ¥402,500 at the Beijing Rongbao autumn art auction in 2023. At the 2024 spring session his oil painting Spring Charm set a personal record of ¥3.22 million. Critics writing in Minsheng Weekly note that his brush economy balances fullness and void, allowing the eye to oscillate between substance and breath, an approach Yi links to Chan-Buddhist conceptions of emptiness. He lectures on image aesthetics at universities and authored Civil Servant Image Handbook (2003), regarded as China's first professional guide to visual presentation in public service.

== Exhibitions ==
Yi's work featured in the "Beijing Double-Olympics Retrospective Art Exhibition" at the Beijing Olympic Museum from 4 February to 10 May 2024, a survey of art created for both the 2008 and 2022 Games. On 11 December 2023 his canvases Auspicious Clouds and Enigma were displayed ahead of sale in the Contemporary Art section of Beijing Rongbao's autumn auction, where their paired hanging highlighted his manipulation of colour-field luminosity. A solo exhibition titled "Exploration·Traces" is scheduled for later part of 2025 as part of the China–Singapore 60th-anniversary cultural programme and will include live calligraphy demonstrations.
