= List of international prime ministerial trips made by Mark Carney =

Mark Carney, the 24th and current prime minister of Canada, has made 29 trips to 32 countries since his premiership began on March 14, 2025.

== Summary ==
The number of visits per country where Prime Minister Carney travelled are:

- One visit to Antigua and Barbuda, Armenia, Australia, Belgium, Cambodia, Egypt, Germany, India, Japan, Latvia, Malaysia, Mexico, the Netherlands, Norway, the Philippines, Poland, Qatar, Saudi Arabia, Singapore, South Africa, Switzerland, South Korea, Ukraine, United Arab Emirates and the Vatican City
- Two visits to China, Ireland and Turkey
- Three visits to Italy
- Four visits to the United Kingdom
- Six visits to France
- Seven visits to the United States

World map highlighting countries visited by Mark Carney during his premiership, as of November 2026 One visit Two visits Three visits Four visits Five visits Six visits Seven or more visits Canada

== 2025 ==
#	Country	Location	Date	Details	Image
1	France	Paris	March 17	Carney met with President Emmanuel Macron in Paris for his first foreign destination as Prime Minister.	
1	United Kingdom	London	March 17–18	Carney met with Prime Minister Keir Starmer and King Charles III.	
2	United States	Washington, D.C.	May 5–6	Carney met with President Donald Trump.	
3	Italy	Rome	May 17–18	Carney attended the inauguration of Pope Leo XIV. He also met with Italian Prime Minister Giorgia Meloni, German Chancellor Friedrich Merz, President of the European Commission Ursula von der Leyen and Ukrainian President Volodymyr Zelenskyy.	
3	Vatican City	Vatican City	May 18	Prime Minister Carney briefly met with Pope Leo XIV at St. Peter's Basilica.	
4	Belgium	Brussels, Antwerp	June 22–24	Carney attended the EU-Canada Summit and met with European Commission President Ursula von der Leyen and European Council President António Costa.	
4	Netherlands	The Hague	June 24–25	Carney attended the 2025 NATO summit.	
5	Ukraine	Kyiv	August 24	Carney met with President Volodymyr Zelenskyy and Prime Minister Yulia Svyrydenko.	
5	Poland	Warsaw, Rzeszów	August 23–25	Carney met with Prime Minister Donald Tusk and President Karol Nawrocki. He had earlier transited through Przemyśl Główny railway station to head to Kyiv.	
5	Germany	Berlin, Kiel	August 25–26	Carney met with Chancellor Friedrich Merz. He also visited a defence manufacturing facility in Kiel.	
5	Latvia	Riga, Ādaži	August 26–27	Carney met with Prime Minister Evika Siliņa. Carney also visited Canadian troops stationed at Ādaži Military Camp and extended Canada's peacekeeping mission in Latvia to 2029.	
6	Mexico	Mexico City	September 18–19	Carney met with President Claudia Sheinbaum and launched a Comprehensive Strategic Partnership.	
7	United States	New York City	September 21–24	Carney participated in the Eightieth session of the United Nations General Assembly. Carney also recognized Palestine's statehood in a speech to the United Nations.	
8	United Kingdom	London	September 26–28	Carney met with Prime Minister Keir Starmer. He also attended the Global Progress Action Summit.	
9	United States	Washington, D.C.	October 6–7	Carney met with President Donald Trump. Carney also met with Vice President JD Vance.	
10	Egypt	Sharm El-Sheikh	October 13–14	Carney attended the 2025 Gaza peace summit and the signing of the Middle East peace plan as the first-stage implementation of the bigger Gaza peace plan, which sought an end to the Gaza War. A Bombardier Global Express was chartered to ferry him to the last-minute organized summit, due to a lack of available Royal Canadian Air Force VIP aircraft and crew on standby.	
11	Malaysia	Kuala Lumpur	October 25–28	Carney participated in the 20th East Asia Summit and the 47th ASEAN summit.	
11	Singapore	Singapore	October 28–29	Carney met with Prime Minister Lawrence Wong and celebrated 60 years of Canada–Singapore relations.	
11	South Korea	Gyeongju	October 29 – November 1	Carney attended dinner with other world leaders and the APEC summit.	
12	United Arab Emirates	Abu Dhabi	November 20–21	Carney met with President Sheikh Mohamed bin Zayed.	
12	South Africa	Johannesburg	November 22–23	Carney attended the 2025 G20 summit.	
13	United States	Washington, D.C.	December 5	Special guest at the FIFA World Cup Draw; trilateral meeting, parallel to the event, with Donald Trump, President of the United States and Claudia Sheinbaum, President of Mexico.	

== 2026 ==
#	Country	Location	Date	Details	Image
14	France	Paris	January 5–6	Carney participated in the Coalition of the Willing meeting with fellow leaders.	
15	China	Beijing	January 13–17	Carney met with President Xi Jinping.	
15	Qatar	Doha	January 17–19	Carney met with Emir Tamim bin Hamad Al Thani and expanded bilateral trade with the nation. First sitting Canadian Prime Minister to visit the country.	
15	Switzerland	Davos	January 19–21	Carney attended the annual World Economic Forum and delivered his Davos speech.	
16	India	Mumbai, New Delhi	February 27 – March 2	Carney met with Prime Minister Narendra Modi. He and Modi announced a myriad of new deals between the two countries, with Carney opened up about a potential trade deal between the two countries materializing at the end of the year.	
16	Australia	Sydney, Canberra	March 3–6	Carney met with Prime Minister Anthony Albanese and addressed the Australian parliament. He also took part in a conversation with the Lowy Institute.	
16	Japan	Tokyo	March 6–7	Carney met with Prime Minister Sanae Takaichi as part of his efforts to diversify Canada's trade.	
17	Norway	Oslo, Bardufoss	March 13–15	Carney observed the Norwegian-led NATO exercise Nordic Response in Bardufoss. He then traveled onto Oslo to meet with Prime Minister Jonas Gahr Støre to advance Canada-Norway trade relation and mutual Arctic security defence.	
17	United Kingdom	London	March 15–16	Carney met with Prime Minister Keir Starmer to discuss a range of issues, including collective defence, global economic shifts and the ongoing situation in the Middle East. He then met with King Charles III.	
17	Italy	Rome	March 16–23	Carney headed to Rome for a week-long vacation with family.	
18	Armenia	Yerevan	May 3–4	Carney participated in the 8th European Political Community Summit, marking the first time a non-European leader joined the event.	
19	United States	New York City	May 27–28	Carney delivered remarks and took part in a featured conversation with the Economic Club of New York.	
20	France	Paris	June 12–13	Carney met with President Emmanuel Macron and attended a working dinner held at the Élysée Palace.	
20	Ireland	Dublin, Aghagower, Westport, County Mayo	June 13–15	First bilateral visit of a sitting Canadian Prime Minister in nearly a decade. Carney met with the Taoiseach of Ireland, Micheál Martin, in Dublin; as well as with the President of Ireland, Catherine Connolly, in County Mayo. He also visited his ancestral home in Aghagower.	
20	France	Évian-les-Bains	June 15–17	Arriving and departing via Geneva Airport, Carney attended the 52nd G7 summit.	
21	Turkey	Ankara	July 7–8	Carney attended the 2026 NATO summit.	
21	Saudi Arabia	Jeddah	July 8–10	First bilateral visit by a sitting Canadian Prime Minister in 25 years, Carney met with Crown Prince Mohammad bin Salman to deepen trade, technology and defence partnerships.	
22	United States	East Rutherford	July 19	Carney attended the 2026 FIFA World Cup final at MetLife Stadium in New Jersey, alongside Mexican President Claudia Sheinbaum and US President Donald Trump. Other notable foreign dignitaries included Spanish Prime Minister Pedro Sánchez, as well as the entire Spanish Royal Family.	
23	Italy	Grosseto	August 8–16	Carney headed to Tuscany for a week-long summer vacation.	
24	France	Strasbourg	September 16–17	Carney became the first sitting Canadian Prime Minister to attend the State of the European Union address. He also addressed the European Parliament at the invitation of the President of the European Parliament, Roberta Metsola.	
24	United Kingdom	Liverpool	September 16	Carney attended a match between Wolverhampton Wanderers F.C. and Everton F.C., together with newly appointed Prime Minister Andy Burnham, at Hill Dickinson Stadium.	
25	France	Saint-Pierre and Miquelon	September 20	Carney met with President Emmanuel Macron for a bilateral meeting. First incumbent Canadian prime minister to visit Saint-Pierre and Miquelon.	
26	United States	New York City	September 21–23	Carney participated in the 81st United Nations General Assembly. He also launched the OceanEye International Alliance for the Global Ocean Observing System during the trip, alongside European Commission President Ursula von der Leyen.	
27	Turkey	Ankara, Istanbul	October 22–24	Carney met with President Recep Tayyip Erdoğan. First bilateral visit by an incumbent Canadian prime minister to the country.	
28	Antigua and Barbuda	St. John's	November 2–3	Carney attended the 2026 Commonwealth Heads of Government Meeting.	
29	Ireland	Dublin	November 12	Carney participated in the 9th European Political Community Summit.	
29	Philippines	Metro Manila	November 14–15	Carney took part in the 49th ASEAN Summit and Related Summits and wrapped up negotiations for a free trade agreement with ASEAN. On the summit's sidelines, he met with President Bongbong Marcos as Canada and the Philippines concluded their own negotiations on another free trade agreement; both are expected to be signed in 2027. He also met with Brazilian President Luiz Inácio Lula da Silva. Carney had spent roughly 23 hours flying on the considerably longer westbound route from Dublin to Manila, crossing the Atlantic, Arctic and Pacific Oceans, and the International Date Line, with a fuel stop in Anchorage to avoid Russian and Middle Eastern airspace.	
29	Cambodia	Phnom Penh	November 15–16	Carney attended the 20th Organisation internationale de la Francophonie summit.	
29	China	Shenzhen	November 16–19	Carney attended the APEC China 2026.	

== Future trips ==
Country	Location	Date	Details
United States	Doral	December 14–15	Carney is scheduled to attend the 2026 G20 summit.
Dominican Republic	Punta Cana	TBD	Carney is expected to attend the 10th Summit of the Americas.
Brazil	TBD	First quarter of 2027	The Governments of Brazil and Canada have agreed to exchange bilateral visits at the highest level, with both visits slated to happen within the first half of 2027.

== Multilateral meetings ==
Mark Carney is scheduled to attend the following summits during his premiership:

Group	2025	2026	2027	2028
UNGA	September 21–24, (United States) New York City	September 21–23, (United States) New York City	TBD, (United States) New York City	TBD, (United States) New York City
APEC	October 31 – November 1, (South Korea) Gyeongju	November 18–19, (China) Shenzhen	TBD, (Vietnam) Phú Quốc	TBD, Mexico
ASEAN	October 26–28, (Malaysia) Kuala Lumpur	November 15–17, (Philippines) Pasay	not a member	
G7	June 16–17, (Canada) Kananaskis	June 15–17, (France) Évian-les-Bains	TBD, United States	TBD, United Kingdom
G20	November 22–23, (South Africa) Johannesburg	December 14–15, (United States) Doral	TBA	TBA
NATO	June 24–25, (Netherlands) The Hague	July 7–8, (Turkey) Ankara	TBD, (Albania) Tirana	TBA
SOA (OAS)	none	TBD, (Dominican Republic) Punta Cana	TBA	TBA
NALS	TBA	TBA	TBA	TBA
OIF	none	November 15–16, (Cambodia) Phnom Penh	none	TBD, (Canada) Ottawa–Gatineau
CHOGM	none	November 3–4, (Antigua and Barbuda) St John's	none	TBD
Others	March 15, (videoconference) (United Kingdom) London	Together for peace and security summit January 6, (France) Paris		
Others	Canada–EU Summit; June 22–23, (Belgium) Brussels	8th European Political Community Summit; May 3–4, (Armenia) Yerevan		
Others	Global Progress Action Summit; September 26–28, (United Kingdom) London	Canada–EU Summit; October 29–30, Montreal		
Others	Gaza peace summit October 13, (Egypt) Sharm el-Sheikh	9th European Political Community Summit; November 12, (Republic of Ireland) Dublin		
Others	██ = Future event ██ = Did not attend			

== See also ==
- Foreign relations of Canada
- List of international prime ministerial trips made by Justin Trudeau, his predecessor
- List of international trips made by prime ministers of Canada
