= List of international prime ministerial trips made by Justin Trudeau =

Justin Trudeau, the 23rd prime minister of Canada, had made 96 trips to 50 countries during his premiership from November 4, 2015, to March 14, 2025. Trudeau did not make any international trips between February 2020 and June 2021, due to the COVID-19 pandemic.

== Summary ==
The number of visits per country where Prime Minister Trudeau travelled are:

- One visit to Armenia, Bermuda, Brazil, Cambodia, Cuba, Ethiopia, Iceland, Ireland, Israel, Kuwait, Laos, Liberia, Lithuania, Madagascar, Mali, Malta, the Netherlands, Papua New Guinea, Portugal, Rwanda, Saint Kitts and Nevis, Senegal, Spain, South Korea, Thailand, Tunisia, Turkey, Vatican City, and Vietnam
- Two visits to Argentina, the Bahamas, China, Costa Rica, India, Indonesia, Jamaica, Mexico, the Philippines, and Singapore
- Three visits to Italy, Japan, Latvia, Peru, and Switzerland
- Four visits to Poland
- Five visits to Germany
- Six visits to Belgium and Ukraine
- Eleven visits to France and the United Kingdom
- Thirty-four visits to the United States

World map highlighting countries visited by Justin Trudeau while prime minister, as of December 2022 1 visit 2 visits 3 visits 4 visits 5 visits 6 visits 7 or more visits Canada

== 2015 ==
#	Country	Location	Date	Details	Image
1	Turkey	Antalya	November 14–16	Trudeau travelled to Antalya to attend the G-20 summit. Trudeau met with Indonesian president Joko Widodo, German chancellor Angela Merkel, Mexican president Enrique Peña Nieto, Chinese president Xi Jinping, and Italian prime minister Matteo Renzi.	
1	Philippines	Manila	November 17–19	Trudeau travelled to Manila to attend the APEC meeting. Trudeau met with Japanese prime minister Shinzō Abe, Filipino president Benigno Aquino III, South Korean president Park Geun-hye, and United States president Barack Obama.	
2	United Kingdom	London	November 24–26	Trudeau travelled to London to meet with Prime Minister David Cameron and Queen Elizabeth II.	
2	Malta	Valletta	November 26–28	Trudeau travelled to Valletta to attend the 2015 Commonwealth Heads of Government Meeting. Trudeau met with Maltese prime minister Joseph Muscat and Australian prime minister Malcolm Turnbull. Gave toast as newest Commonwealth leader at dinner with Queen Elizabeth II and all other Commonwealth leaders.	
2	France	Paris	November 28–30	Trudeau travelled to Paris to attend the 2015 United Nations Climate Change Conference. Trudeau met separately with French president François Hollande, Ukrainian president Petro Poroshenko, Israeli prime minister Benjamin Netanyahu, President of the European Council Donald Tusk, and President of the European Commission Jean-Claude Juncker.	
3	Saint Kitts and Nevis	Nevis	December	Trudeau travelled to Saint Kitts and Nevis for Christmas vacation.	

== 2016 ==
#	Country	Location	Date	Details	Image
4	Switzerland	Davos	January 20–23	Trudeau travelled to Davos to attend the World Economic Forum Annual Meeting 2016. Trudeau met with President of the European Parliament Martin Schulz and President of the Swiss Confederation Johann Schneider-Ammann.	
5	United States	Washington, D.C.	March 9–11	Trudeau travelled to Washington, D.C. to meet with President Barack Obama. Trudeau attended the State Dinner at the White House.	
6	United States	New York City	March 16–17	Trudeau travelled to New York City to visit the UN Headquarters. Trudeau announced Canada's bid to take a seat in the UN Security Council for a two-year term beginning in 2021.	
7	United States	Washington, D.C.	March 30 – April 1	Trudeau travelled to Washington, D.C. to attend the 2016 Nuclear Security Summit. Trudeau met with Argentine president Mauricio Macri, British prime minister David Cameron and Indian prime minister Narendra Modi. Trudeau attended a working luncheon given by Japanese prime minister Shinzō Abe. Trudeau attended Working Leaders' Dinner at White House.	
8	Japan	Tokyo, Shima	May 22–27	Trudeau travelled to Tokyo to meet with Emperor Akihito and Empress Michiko and Prime Minister Shinzō Abe. Trudeau met with representatives from Honda and Toyota as well as other industry leaders. Trudeau later attended the G7 summit in Shima, Mie Prefecture with other G7 leaders, including French president François Hollande.	
9	United States	Sun Valley, Idaho	July 6	Trudeau travelled to Sun Valley, Idaho, to participate in the Allen & Company Sun Valley Conference.	
10	Poland	Warsaw	July 7–10	Trudeau travelled to Warsaw to attend the 27th NATO Summit. Trudeau committed 450 Canadian troops to NATO deployment in Baltic region. Trudeau met with Afghan president Ashraf Ghani, Danish prime minister Lars Løkke Rasmussen and Latvian president Raimonds Vējonis.	
10	Ukraine	Kyiv	July 10–12	Trudeau travelled to Kyiv to meet with President Petro Poroshenko. Trudeau signed the Canada-Ukraine Free Trade Agreement.	
11	China	Beijing, Hangzhou	August 30 – September 7	Trudeau travelled to Beijing to meet with President Xi Jinping and Premier Li Keqiang. Trudeau later attended the G-20 summit in Hangzhou. Trudeau was nicknamed "小土豆 xiao tudou" (Potato Jr) by the Chinese public.	
12	United States	New York City	September 19–20	Trudeau travelled to New York City to participate in the General Debate of the seventy-first session of the United Nations General Assembly.	
13	Israel	Jerusalem	September 29–30	Trudeau travelled to Jerusalem to attend the memorial service for former president Shimon Peres. Trudeau led the Canadian delegation.	
14	Belgium	Brussels	October 30	Trudeau travelled to Brussels to sign the CETA.	
15	Cuba	Havana	November 15–16	Trudeau travelled to Havana to meet with President Raúl Castro.	
15	Argentina	Buenos Aires	November 16–18	Trudeau travelled to Buenos Aires to meet with President Mauricio Macri. Trudeau discussed the Falkland Islands dispute.	
15	Peru	Lima	November 18–20	Trudeau travelled to Lima to attend the APEC meeting. Trudeau met with Australian prime minister Malcolm Turnbull, Mexican president Enrique Peña Nieto, Vietnamese prime minister Nguyen Xuan Phuc and United States president Barack Obama. Trudeau discussed TPP with other signatory nations' leaders on sidelines.	
16	Liberia	Monrovia	November 24–25	Trudeau travelled to Monrovia to meet President Ellen Johnson Sirleaf and discussed girls' education.	
16	Madagascar	Antananarivo	November 25–27	Trudeau travelled to Antananarivo to attend the Organisation internationale de la Francophonie Summit.	
17	The Bahamas	Bell Island	December	Trudeau travelled to The Bahamas for Christmas vacation. Trudeau was invited to the island by the Aga Khan who Trudeau claimed to be a "close family friend".	

== 2017 ==
#	Country	Location	Date	Details	Image
18	United States	Washington, D.C.	February 13	Trudeau travelled to Washington, D.C. to meet with President Donald Trump. Trudeau also met with House Speaker Paul Ryan and Senate Majority Leader Mitch McConnell.	
19	France	Paris	February 16	Trudeau travelled to Paris to address the European Parliament.	
19	Germany	Berlin, Hamburg	February 16–17	Trudeau travelled to Berlin to meet Chancellor Angela Merkel. Trudeau attended the St. Matthew's Day banquet in Hamburg.	
20	United States	Houston, Texas	March 9–10	Trudeau travelled to Houston, Texas, to attend the CERAWeek gathering.	
21	United States	Broadway, New York City	March 14–16	Trudeau travelled to the Gerald Schoenfeld Theatre in New York City to watch the musical Come From Away.	
22	United States	New York City	April 6	Trudeau travelled to New York City to attend the Women in the World summit.	
23	France	Lille, Courseulles-sur-Mer	April 8–10	Trudeau travelled to Lille to attend the commemoration of the 100th anniversary of the Battle of Vimy Ridge. Trudeau met with President François Hollande. He travelled to the Juno Beach Centre before returning to Canada.	
24	United States	Redmond, Washington	May 17–18	Trudeau travelled to Redmond, Washington, to attend Microsoft CEO summit.	
25	Belgium	Brussels	May 24–26	Trudeau travelled to Brussels to attend the 28th NATO summit.	
25	Italy	Taormina, Amatrice, Rome	May 26–31	Trudeau travelled to Taormina, Sicily to attend the G7 summit. Trudeau met with French president Emmanuel Macron. Trudeau later visited Amatrice since it was devastated by the powerful earthquake in August 2016. Trudeau travelled to Rome to meet with Prime Minister Paolo Gentiloni and President Sergio Mattarella.	
25	Vatican City	Vatican City	May 29	Trudeau travelled to Vatican City to meet with Pope Francis.	
26	Ireland	Dublin	July 3–5	Trudeau travelled to Dublin to meet with Taoiseach Leo Varadkar and President Michael D. Higgins.	
26	United Kingdom	Edinburgh	July 5–6	Trudeau travelled to Edinburgh to meet with Queen Elizabeth II. Trudeau also received an honorary degree (Doctor honoris causa) from the University of Edinburgh.	
26	Germany	Hamburg	July 6–8	Trudeau travelled to Hamburg to attend the G-20 summit. Trudeau met with French president Emmanuel Macron, Indian prime minister Narendra Modi and Mexican president Enrique Peña Nieto. Trudeau also addressed the Global Citizen Festival.	
27	United States	Providence	July 14	Trudeau travelled to Providence to meet with Governors and Vice President Mike Pence at the 2017 National Governors Association summer meeting.	
28	United States	New York City	September 19–20	Trudeau travelled to New York City to participate in the General Debate of the seventy-second session of the United Nations General Assembly.	
29	United States	Washington, D.C.	October 10–11	Trudeau travelled to Washington, D.C. to participate in a keynote conversation at the Fortune Most Powerful Women Summit. Trudeau also met President Donald Trump.	
29	Mexico	Mexico City	October 12–13	Trudeau travelled to Mexico City to meet with President Enrique Peña Nieto.	
30	Vietnam	Hanoi, Ho Chi Minh City, Da Nang	November 8–11	Trudeau travelled to Hanoi to meet with President Trần Đại Quang and Prime Minister Nguyễn Xuân Phúc. Trudeau later attended the APEC Vietnam 2017 in Da Nang. Trudeau met with Australian prime minister Malcolm Turnbull, Japanese prime minister Shinzō Abe and Mexican president Enrique Peña Nieto.	
30	Philippines	Manila	November 12–14	Trudeau travelled to Manila to attend the 31st ASEAN Summit.	
31	China	Beijing, Guangzhou	December 3–7	Trudeau travelled to Beijing to meet with President Xi Jinping and Premier Li Keqiang.	

== 2018 ==
#	Country	Location	Date	Details	Image
32	Switzerland	Davos	January 22–25	Trudeau travelled to Davos to attend the World Economic Forum Annual Meeting 2018.	
33	United States	Chicago, San Francisco, Los Angeles, Simi Valley	February 7–10	Trudeau travelled to the United States to "further strengthen the deep bonds that unite Canada and the United States".	
34	India	New Delhi, Agra, Amritsar, Ahmedabad, Mumbai	February 17–23	Trudeau travelled to India to meet with Prime Minister Narendra Modi.	
35	United States	Florida	March 15–18	Trudeau travelled to Florida for a vacation.	
36	Peru	Lima	April 13–14	Trudeau travelled to Lima to attend the Summit of the Americas.	
36	France	Paris	April 15–17	Trudeau travelled to Paris to meet with President Emmanuel Macron and Prime Minister Édouard Philippe. Trudeau later addressed the Assemblee Nationale.	
36	United Kingdom	London, Windsor	April 17–20	Trudeau travelled to the United Kingdom to attended the 2018 Commonwealth Heads of Government Meeting. Trudeau met with Prime Minister Theresa May and Queen Elizabeth II.	
37	United States	New York City, Boston, Vermont	May 16–21	Trudeau accepted an honorary doctor of laws degree at New York University's 186th commencement ceremony, addressed the Economic Club of New York, and participated in the Solve at MIT conference. He then spent the Victoria Day long weekend in Vermont.	
38	Latvia	Riga	July 9–10	Trudeau travelled to Riga to meet Prime Minister Māris Kučinskis and President Raimonds Vējonis. Trudeau toured the Ādaži Military Base and met with members of the Canadian-led multinational NATO Enhanced Forward Presence battlegroup Latvia and the Canadian Armed Forces deployed on Operation REASSURANCE.	
38	Belgium	Brussels	July 11–12	Trudeau travelled to Brussels to attend the 29th NATO summit.	
39	United States	New York City	September 24–26	Trudeau travelled to New York City to attend the seventy-third session of the United Nations General Assembly.	
40	Armenia	Yerevan	October 11–13	Trudeau travelled to Yerevan to attend the Organisation internationale de la Francophonie Summit.	
41	France	Lille, Vimy and Paris	November 10–12	Trudeau travelled to Lille to attend the commemoration of the 100th anniversary of the Armistice with Germany that brought major hostilities of World War I to an end.	
41	Singapore	Singapore	November 13–16	Trudeau travelled to Singapore to attend a leaders' meeting at the 33rd ASEAN Summit.	
41	Papua New Guinea	Port Moresby	November 16–18	Trudeau travelled to Port Moresby to attend the APEC Papua New Guinea 2018.	
42	Argentina	Buenos Aires	November 29 – December 1	Trudeau travelled to Buenos Aires to attend the G20 summit. Trudeau met with British prime minister Theresa May, French president Emmanuel Macron and South African president Cyril Ramaphosa. Trudeau also signed the United States Mexico Canada Agreement with outgoing Mexican president Enrique Peña Nieto and United States president Donald Trump.	
43	Mali	Gao	December 22	Trudeau travelled to Mali to visit the troops.	

== 2019 ==
#	Country	Location	Date	Details	Image
44	United States	Florida	March 10–11	Trudeau travelled to Florida for a vacation.	
45	United States	Chicago	May 12	Trudeau travelled to Chicago to attend his mother's show.	
46	France	Paris	May 15–17	Trudeau travelled to Paris to meet with President Emmanuel Macron.	
47	United Kingdom	Portsmouth	June 5	Trudeau travelled to Portsmouth to attend the 75th anniversary of D-Day commemorative ceremonies. Trudeau met with Prime Minister Theresa May.	
47	France	Juno Beach, Paris	June 6–7	Trudeau travelled to France to attend the 75th anniversary of D-Day and the Battle of Normandy. Trudeau met with President Emmanuel Macron.	
48	United States	Washington, D.C.	June 20	Trudeau travelled to Washington, D.C. to meet with President Donald Trump. Trudeau also met with House Speaker Nancy Pelosi and Senate Majority Leader Mitch McConnell.	
49	Japan	Osaka	June 27–29	Trudeau travelled to Osaka to attend the G20 summit. Trudeau met with South Korean president Moon Jae-in.	
50	France	Biarritz	August 23–26	Trudeau travelled to Biarritz to attend the G7 summit. Trudeau met with British prime minister Boris Johnson, German chancellor Angela Merkel, Japanese prime minister Shinzō Abe and United States president Donald Trump.	
51	United Kingdom	London, Watford	December 3–4	Trudeau travelled to Watford to attend the 30th NATO summit. Trudeau met with Prince Charles, Latvian president Egils Levits, and United States president Donald Trump.	
52	Costa Rica		December 20	Trudeau went to Costa Rica for a Christmas vacation.	

== 2020 ==
#	Country	Location	Date	Details	Image
53	Ethiopia	Addis Ababa	February 6–10	Trudeau met with Prime Minister Abiy Ahmed and President Sahle-Work Zewde.	
53	Kuwait	Kuwait City	February 11	Trudeau met with Emir Sheikh Sabah Al-Ahmad Al-Jaber Al-Sabah and Canadian troops.	
53	Senegal	Dakar	February 11–14	Trudeau met with President Macky Sall.	
53	Germany	Munich	February 14	Trudeau attended the Munich Security Conference.	

== 2021 ==
#	Country	Location	Date	Details	Image
54	United Kingdom	Carbis Bay	June 10–13	Trudeau travelled to Carbis Bay to attend the G7 summit. Trudeau met with British prime minister Boris Johnson French president Emmanuel Macron, German chancellor Angela Merkel, Italian prime minister Mario Draghi and Japanese prime minister Yoshihide Suga.	
54	Belgium	Brussels	June 13–14	Trudeau travelled to Brussels to attend the 31st NATO summit.	
55	Netherlands	The Hague	October 29	Trudeau travelled to The Hague to meet with Prime Minister Mark Rutte. He also addressed Dutch parliamentarians and travelled to the Canadian War Cemetery with Princess Margriet of the Netherlands.	
55	Italy	Rome	October 29–31	Trudeau travelled to Rome to attend the G20 summit. Trudeau met with British prime minister Boris Johnson.	
55	United Kingdom	Glasgow	November 1–2	Trudeau travelled to Glasgow to attend the 2021 United Nations Climate Change Conference. Trudeau met with Argentine President Alberto Fernández.	
56	United States	Washington, D.C.	November 17–18	Trudeau travelled to Washington, D.C. to attend the North American Leaders' Summit with President Joe Biden and Mexican president Andrés Manuel López Obrador. Trudeau also met with House Speaker Nancy Pelosi, Senate Majority Leader Chuck Schumer and Vice President Kamala Harris.	

== 2022 ==
#	Country	Location	Date	Details	Image
57	United Kingdom	London	March 6–8	Trudeau travelled to London to meet with Prime Minister Boris Johnson and Queen Elizabeth II. Trudeau also met with Dutch prime minister Mark Rutte.	
57	Latvia	Riga	March 8–9	Trudeau travelled to Riga to meet with Prime Minister Krišjānis Kariņš and President Egils Levits. Trudeau also met with Spanish prime minister Pedro Sánchez and NATO Secretary General Jens Stoltenberg.	
57	Germany	Berlin	March 9–10	Trudeau travelled to Berlin to meet with Chancellor Olaf Scholz and President Frank-Walter Steinmeier.	
57	Poland	Warsaw	March 10–11	Trudeau travelled to Warsaw to meet with Prime Minister Mateusz Morawiecki and President Andrzej Duda. Trudeau also meet with U.S. Vice President Kamala Harris.	
58	Belgium	Brussels	March 23–24	Trudeau travelled to Brussels to attend the extraordinary NATO summit to discuss the Russian invasion of Ukraine.	
59	Ukraine	Kyiv; Irpin	May 8	Trudeau travelled to Kyiv to meet with President Volodymyr Zelenskyy.	
60	United States	Los Angeles	June 7–11	Trudeau travelled to Los Angeles to attend the Summit of the Americas. Trudeau met with President Joe Biden.	
61	Rwanda	Kigali	June 22–25	Trudeau travelled to Kigali to attend the 2022 Commonwealth Heads of Government Meeting.	
61	Germany	Schloss Elmau	June 25–28	Trudeau travelled to Schloss Elmau to attend the G7 summit. Trudeau met with British prime minister Boris Johnson, French president Emmanuel Macron, and Japanese prime minister Fumio Kishida.	
61	Spain	Madrid	June 28–30	Trudeau travelled to Madrid to attend the 32nd NATO summit.	
62	Costa Rica		August 1–14	Trudeau went to Costa Rica for a vacation.	
63	United Kingdom	London	September 16–19	Trudeau and others, including Governor General Mary Simon, attended the state funeral of Queen Elizabeth II. Trudeau met with new monarch King Charles III and also held bilateral meetings with Prime Minister Liz Truss and Australian prime minister Anthony Albanese.	
63	United States	New York City	September 19–22	Trudeau travelled to New York City to attend the seventy-seventh session of the United Nations General Assembly.	
64	Cambodia	Phnom Penh	November 11–14	Trudeau travelled to Phnom Penh to attend a leaders' meeting at the ASEAN Summit.	
64	Indonesia	Bali	November 14–17	Trudeau travelled to Bali to attend the G20 summit.	
64	Thailand	Bangkok	November 17–18	Trudeau travelled to Bangkok to attend the APEC summit.	
64	Tunisia	Djerba	November 19–20	Trudeau travelled to Djerba to attend the Organisation internationale de la Francophonie Summit.	
65	Jamaica		December 26–January 4, 2023	Trudeau travelled to Jamaica for a vacation.	

== 2023 ==
#	Country	Location	Date	Details	Image
66	Mexico	Mexico City	January 9–11	Trudeau travelled to Mexico City to attend the North American Leaders' Summit with President Andrés Manuel López Obrador and U.S. president Joe Biden.	
67	The Bahamas	Nassau	February 15–16	Trudeau travelled to be a special guest at the 44th Conference of Heads of Government of the Caribbean Community.	
68	United States	Montana	April 6–10	Trudeau travelled for a personal trip.	
69	United States	New York City	April 26–28	Trudeau travelled to attend the Global Citizen NOW summit.	
70	United Kingdom	London	May 6	Trudeau travelled to London to attend the coronation of King Charles III. Trudeau met with Prime Minister Rishi Sunak.	
71	South Korea	Seoul, Gapyeong	May 16–18	Trudeau travelled to Seoul to meet with President Yoon Suk-yeol.	
71	Japan	Hiroshima	May 18–21	Trudeau travelled to Hiroshima to attend the G7 summit. Trudeau met with Prime Minister Fumio Kishida and French president Emmanuel Macron. Trudeau met with French president Emmanuel Macron and Italian prime minister Giorgia Meloni.	
72	Ukraine	Kyiv	June 10	Trudeau travelled to Kyiv to meet with President Volodymyr Zelenskyy and Prime Minister Denys Shmyhal.	
73	Iceland	Reykjavík, Landeyjahöfn, Selfoss and Vestmannaeyjar	June 25–26	Trudeau travelled to Iceland to meet with Nordic leaders.	
74	Latvia	Riga	July 10–11	Trudeau travelled to Riga to meet with President Edgars Rinkēvičs.	
74	Lithuania	Vilnius	July 11–12	Trudeau travelled to Vilnius to attend the 33rd NATO summit.	
75	United States	New York City	July 21	Trudeau travelled to New York to attend the World Law Congress.	
76	Indonesia	Jakarta	September 5–7	Trudeau travelled to Jakarta to attend the 43rd ASEAN Summit.	
76	Singapore	Singapore	September 7–8	Trudeau travelled to Singapore for a bilateral visit.	
76	India	New Delhi	September 9–12	Trudeau travelled to New Delhi to attend the G20 summit.	
77	United States	New York City	September 19–21	Trudeau travelled to New York City to attend the seventy-eighth session of the United Nations General Assembly.	
78	United States	Washington, D.C.	November 3	Trudeau travelled to Washington, D.C. to attend the Americas Partnership for Economic Prosperity Leaders’ Summit.	
79	United States	San Francisco	November 15–17	Trudeau travelled to San Francisco to attend the APEC summit.	
80	Jamaica		December 26–January 4, 2024	Trudeau and his family travelled to Jamaica for a vacation.	

== 2024 ==
#	Country	Location	Date	Details	Image
81	Ukraine	Kyiv	February 24	Trudeau made the unannounced visit to Kyiv to take part in a display of international solidarity to mark the second anniversary of the Russian invasion of Ukraine, together with European Commission President Ursula von der Leyen, Belgian prime minister Alexander De Croo, and Italian prime minister Giorgia Meloni.	
81	Poland	Warsaw	February 25–26	Trudeau travelled to Warsaw to meet with President Andrzej Duda and Prime Minister Donald Tusk.	
82	United States	Philadelphia	May 20–21	Trudeau travelled to Philadelphia to meet with Vice President Kamala Harris and Governor Josh Shapiro.	
83	France	Juno Beach	June 5–6	Trudeau travelled to Juno Beach to attend the 80th anniversary of D-Day and the Battle of Normandy.	
84	Italy	Apulia	June 12–15	Trudeau travelled to Apulia to attend the G7 summit.	
84	Switzerland	Lucerne	June 15–16	Trudeau travelled to Nidwalden to attend the Global peace summit.	
85	United States	Washington, D.C.	July 8	Trudeau travelled to Washington, D.C. for trade meetings with U.S. politicians and business leaders.	
85	United States	Washington, D.C.	July 9–11	Trudeau travelled to Washington, D.C. to attend the 34th NATO summit.	
86	United States	New York City	September 22–25	Trudeau travelled to New York City to attend the seventy-ninth session of the United Nations General Assembly.	
87	France	Villers-Cotterêts	October 3–5	Trudeau travelled to Villers-Cotterêts to attend the Organisation internationale de la Francophonie Summit.	
88	Laos	Vientiane	October 8–11	Trudeau travelled to Vientiane to attend the 45th ASEAN Summit.	
89	Bermuda	Hamilton	November 13	Trudeau delivered a personal eulogy at the funeral of close family friend Peter Green.	
90	Peru	Lima	November 14–17	Trudeau travelled to Lima to attend the APEC summit.	
90	Brazil	Rio de Janeiro	November 17–19	Trudeau travelled to Rio de Janeiro to attend the G20 summit.	
91	United States	Mar-a-Lago	November 29–30	Trudeau travelled to Mar-a-Lago to meet with President-elect Donald Trump.	

== 2025 ==
#	Country	Location	Date	Details	Image
92	United States	Washington, D.C.	January 9	Trudeau travelled to Washington, D.C. to attend the state funeral of former president Jimmy Carter.	
93	Poland	Kraków, Oświęcim, Warsaw	January 26–28	Trudeau travelled to Poland to meet with Canadian Holocaust survivors of the Auschwitz Birkenau German Nazi Concentration and Extermination Camp. Trudeau toured the Auschwitz Research Centre on Hate, Extremism and Radicalization (ARCHER at House 88) and attended a commemoration ceremony marking 80 years since the liberation of the Auschwitz Birkenau German Nazi Concentration and Extermination Camp in Oswiecim. Trudeau and Prime Minister Donald Tusk signed the Canada-Poland Nuclear Energy Cooperation Agreement in Warsaw.	
94	Portugal	Lisbon	February 8	Trudeau travelled to Lisbon to attend the funeral of Aga Khan IV.	
94	France	Paris	February 8–11	Trudeau travelled to Paris to attend the Artificial Intelligence Action Summit.	
94	Belgium	Brussels	February 12	Trudeau travelled to Brussels to meet with European Commission President Ursula von der Leyen and European Council President António Costa.	
95	Ukraine	Kyiv	February 24	Trudeau travelled to Kyiv to mark the third anniversary of the Russian invasion of Ukraine.	
96	United Kingdom	London and Sandringham House	March 1–3	Trudeau travelled to London to attend the Summit on Ukraine. Trudeau also met with Prime Minister Keir Starmer and King Charles III.	

== Multilateral meetings ==
Justin Trudeau participated in the following summits during his premiership:

Group	Year										
Group	2015	2016	2017	2018	2019	2020	2021	2022	2023	2024	2025
UNGA		September 20, (United States) New York City	September 19–21, (United States) New York City	September 24–26, (United States) New York City	September 30, (United States) New York City	September 25, (videoconference) (United States) New York City	September 27, (United States) New York City	September 20–22, (United States) New York City	September 19–21, (United States) New York City	September 22–25, (United States) New York City	
APEC	November 18–19, (Philippines) Manila	November 19–20, (Peru) Lima	November 10–11, (Vietnam) Đà Nẵng	November 17–18, (Papua New Guinea) Port Moresby	November 16–17, (cancelled) (Chile) Santiago	November 20, (videoconference) (Malaysia) Kuala Lumpur	November 12, (videoconference) (New Zealand) Auckland	November 18–19, (Thailand) Bangkok	November 15–17, (United States) San Francisco	November 15–16, (Peru) Lima	
ASEAN (not a member)	Not Invited		November 13–14, (Philippines) Manila	November 14–15, Singapore	Not Invited			November 12–13, (Cambodia) Phnom Penh	September 6–7, (Indonesia) Jakarta	October 10–11, (Laos) Vientiane	
G7		May 26–27, (Japan) Shima	May 26–27, (Italy) Taormina	June 8–9, (Canada) La Malbaie	August 24–26, (France) Biarritz	June 10–12, (cancelled) (United States) Camp David	June 11–13, (United Kingdom) Carbis Bay	June 26–28, (Germany) Schloss Elmau	May 19–21, (Japan) Hiroshima	June 13–15, (Italy) Apulia	
G20	November 15–16, (Turkey) Antalya	September 4–5, (China) Hangzhou	July 7–8, (Germany) Hamburg	November 30 – December 1, (Argentina) Buenos Aires	June 28–29, (Japan) Osaka	November 21–22, (videoconference) (Saudi Arabia) Riyadh	October 30–31, (Italy) Rome	November 15–16, (Indonesia) Bali	September 9–10, (India) New Delhi	November 18–19, (Brazil) Rio de Janeiro	
NATO	None	July 8–9, (Poland) Warsaw	May 25, (Belgium) Brussels	July 11–12, (Belgium) Brussels	December 3–4, (United Kingdom) Watford	None	June 14, (Belgium) Brussels	March 24, (Belgium) Brussels	July 11–12, (Lithuania) Vilnius	July 9–11, (United States) Washington, D.C.	
NATO	None	July 8–9, (Poland) Warsaw	May 25, (Belgium) Brussels	July 11–12, (Belgium) Brussels	December 3–4, (United Kingdom) Watford	None	June 14, (Belgium) Brussels	June 28–30, (Spain) Madrid	July 11–12, (Lithuania) Vilnius	July 9–11, (United States) Washington, D.C.	
SOA (OAS)		None		April 13–14, (Peru) Lima	None			June 8–10, (United States) Los Angeles	None		
NALS	None	June 29, (Canada) Ottawa	None				November 18, (United States) Washington, D.C.	None	January 10, Mexico City	None	None
OIF	None	November 26–27, (Madagascar) Antananarivo	None	October 11–12, (Armenia) Yerevan	None			November 19–20, (Tunisia) Djerba	None	October 4–5, (France) Villers-Cotterêts	None
CHOGM	November 27–28 (Malta) Valletta	None		April 18–20, (United Kingdom) London	None			June 24–25, (Rwanda) Kigali	May 5–6, (United Kingdom) London	October 25–26, (Samoa) Apia	None
Others	UN Climate Change; November 30, (France) Paris	Nuclear Security Summit; March 31 – April 1, (United States) Washington, D.C.	None				UN Climate Change; November 1–2, (United Kingdom) Glasgow	None		Global peace summit June 15–16, (Switzerland) Lucerne	AI Action; February 8–11, (France) Paris
Others	UN Climate Change; November 30, (France) Paris	Nuclear Security Summit; March 31 – April 1, (United States) Washington, D.C.	None				UN Climate Change; November 1–2, (United Kingdom) Glasgow	None		Global peace summit June 15–16, (Switzerland) Lucerne	Canada–EU Summit; February 12, (Belgium) Brussels
Others	UN Climate Change; November 30, (France) Paris	Nuclear Security Summit; March 31 – April 1, (United States) Washington, D.C.	None				UN Climate Change; November 1–2, (United Kingdom) Glasgow	None		Global peace summit June 15–16, (Switzerland) Lucerne	Securing our future March 2, (United Kingdom) London
██ = Did not attend

== See also ==
- Foreign policy of the Justin Trudeau government
- Foreign relations of Canada
- List of international prime ministerial trips made by Stephen Harper, his predecessor
- List of international prime ministerial trips made by Mark Carney, his successor
