= Doral =

Doral may refer to:

== Businesses and brands ==
- Doral (cigarette), an American brand
- Doral Financial Corporation, the holding company of Doral Bank
- Doral Hotel, now the Miami Beach Resort and Spa, Florida, U.S.
- Trump National Doral Miami, a golf resort in Doral, Florida, U.S.
- Doral, a trade name for the sleep medicine quazepam

== People ==
- Doral Moore (born 1997), American basketball player
- Doral Pilling (1906–1982), Canadian javelin thrower

== Other uses ==
- Doral, Florida, U.S., a suburb of Miami
- Aaron Doral, a fictional character from Battlestar Galactica
- The Doral, a minor noble in the Robert A. Heinlein novel Glory Road

== See also ==
- Doral Open, a golf tournament held in Doral, Florida, U.S.
