= 2016 G20 Hangzhou summit =

11th meeting of the Group of Twenty (G20)

2016 G20 Hangzhou summit 11th G20 summit
- 3-4–5 September 2016

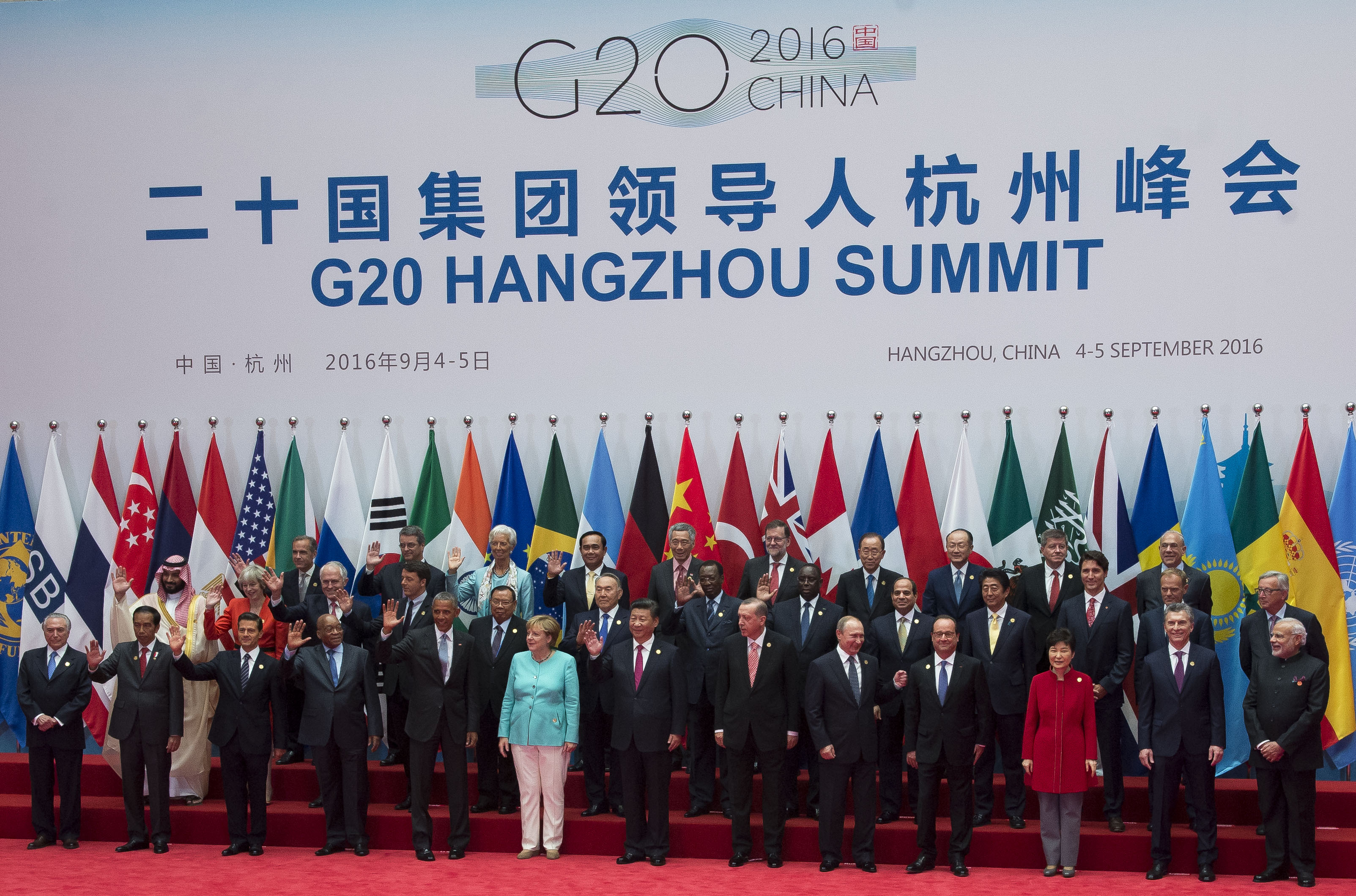
- Group photo, on 4 September 2016
- Host country: China
- Motto: Towards an Innovative, Invigorated, Interconnected, and Inclusive World Economy
- Cities: Hangzhou, Zhejiang
- Venues: Hangzhou International Exhibition Centre
- Participants: G20 members.: Guest invitees: Chad, Egypt, Kazakhstan, Laos, Senegal, Spain, Singapore, & Thailand; Invited bodies: African Union; United Nations.:
- Chair: Xi Jinping

The 2016 G20 Hangzhou summit was the eleventh meeting of the Group of Twenty (G20). It was held in the city of Hangzhou, Zhejiang. It was the first ever G20 summit to be hosted in China and the second in an Asian country after 2010 G20 Seoul summit was hosted in South Korea.

== Context ==
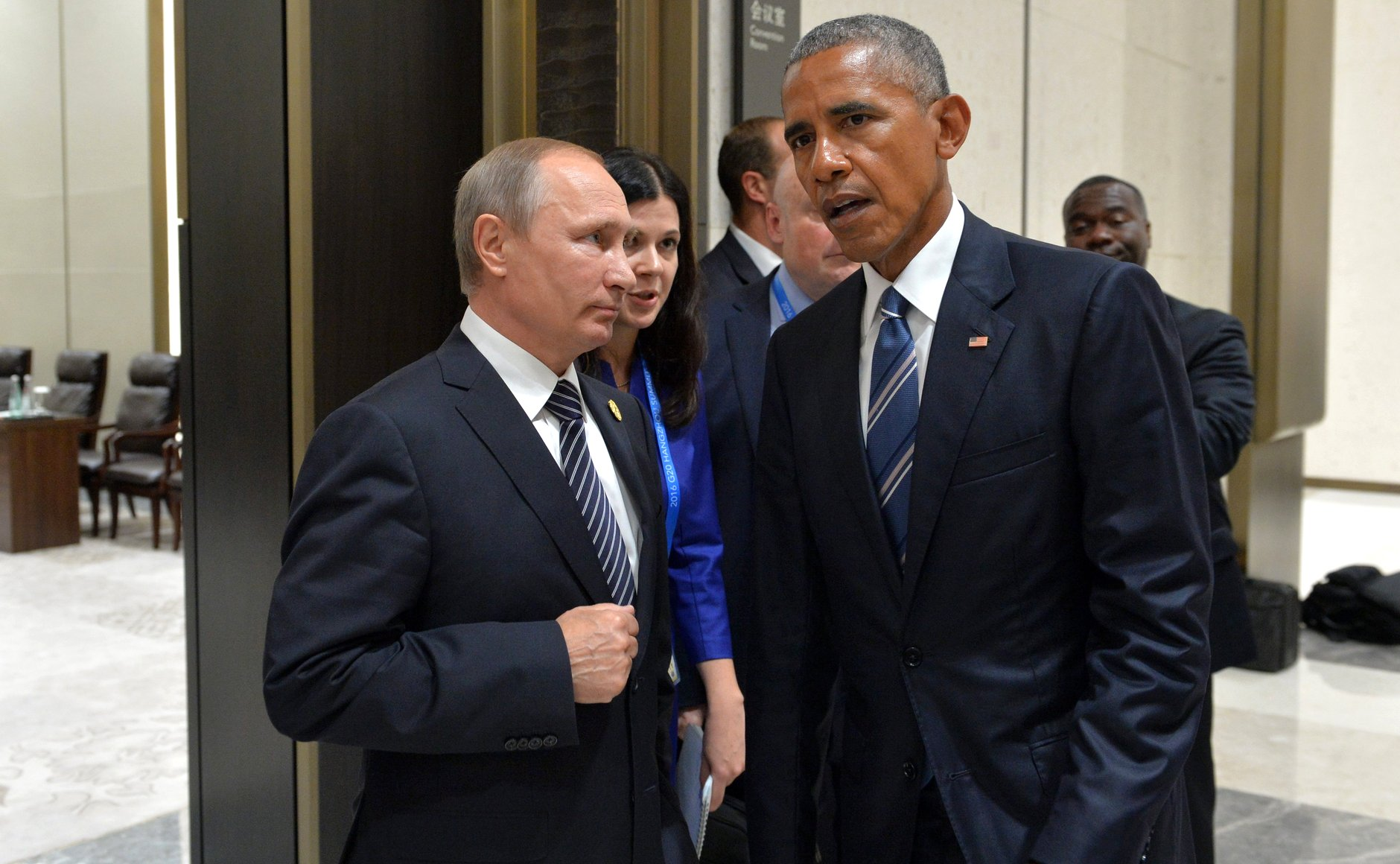
Vladimir Putin and Barack Obama, on 5 September 2016.

=== Pollution in China ===
In the days before the G20 Hangzhou summit, only some vehicles were allowed through the city, construction sites were stopped, inhabitants received a week-long holidays (and were encouraged to leave the city) and factories in the region (including more than two hundred steel mills) were asked to stop their production (in order to temporarily reduce air pollution).

=== Climate change ===
On 3 September 2016, US President Barack Obama and CCP General Secretary Xi Jinping announced the ratification of the Paris Agreement (of the 2015 United Nations Climate Change Conference) by their countries, bringing the total number of countries ratifying the agreement to 26; the United States and China represent respectively 18 percent and 20 percent of global carbon dioxide emissions (the driving force behind global warming).

=== Economic statements ===
The main themes of final communiqué of the summit are:

- Fight against tax evasion (asking the OECD for a black list of tax havens).
- Favour international trade and investments and opposition to protectionism.
- Fiscal stimulus and innovation to boost economic growth.
- Combating "populist attacks" against globalization.
- Strengthen support for refugees.

=== Summit documents ===
The heads of state and government of G20 issued a joint statement with a summary of the main results of the meeting. The statement is divided in the following documents:

- Communiqué 2016
- Annex to the Leaders' Declaration
- Hangzhou Action Plan
- Blueprint on Innovative Growth
- G20 Action Plan on the 2030 Agenda for Sustainable Development

== Participating leaders ==
List of leaders who took part in the 2016 G20 Hangzhou summit:

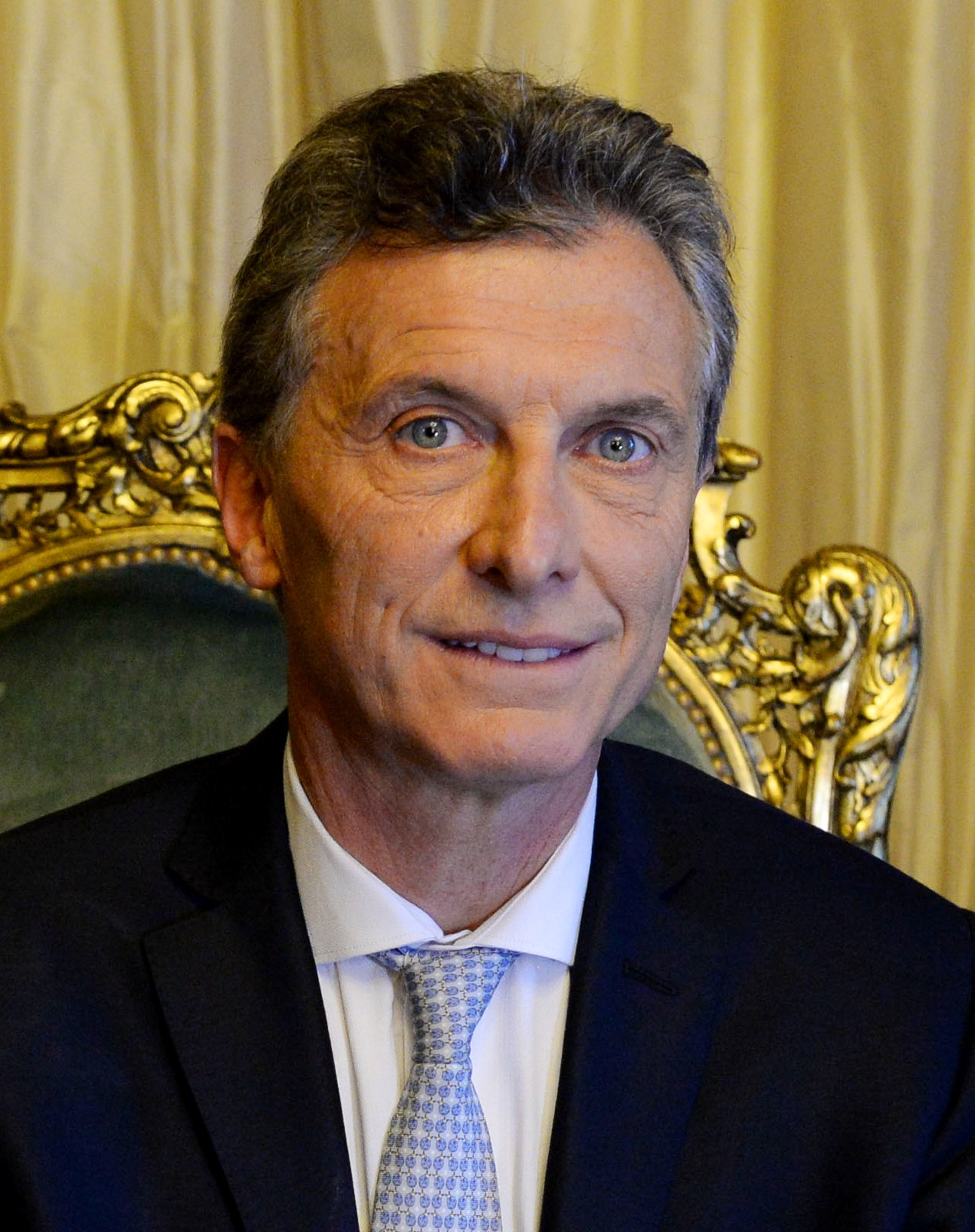
Argentina
Mauricio Macri, President

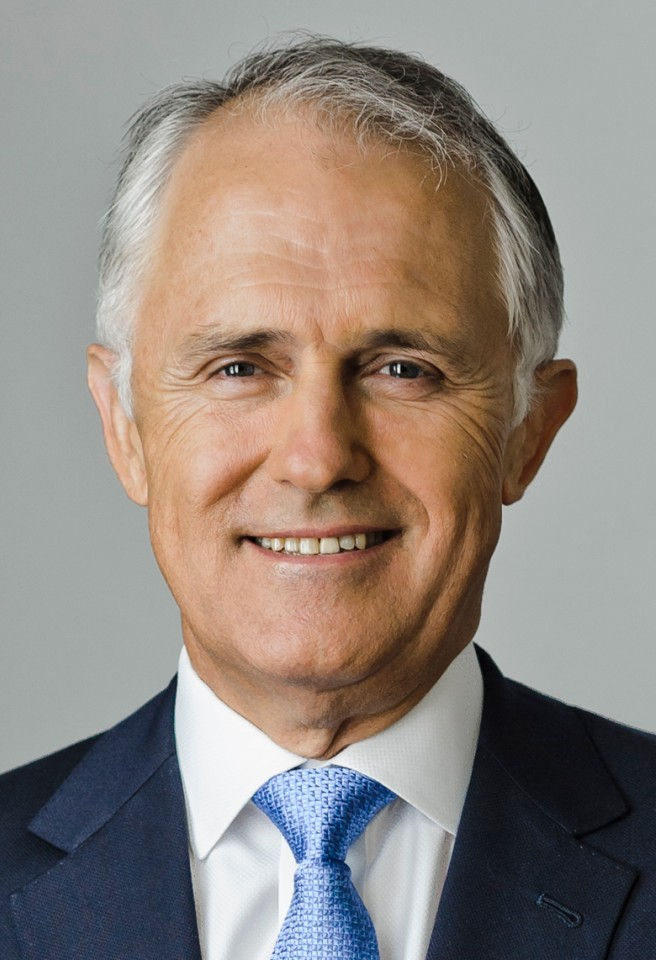
Australia
Malcolm Turnbull, Prime Minister

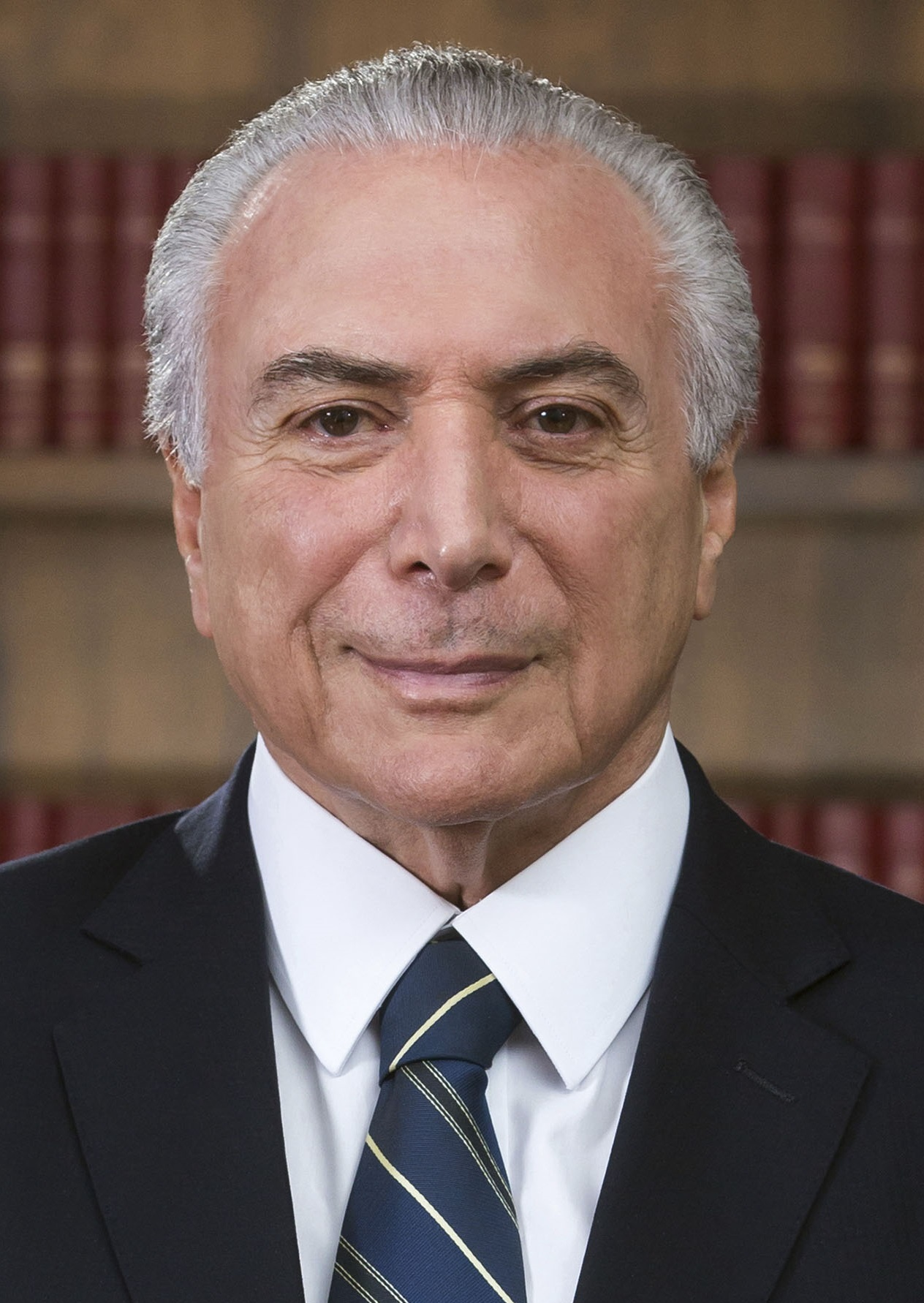
Brazil
Michel Temer, President

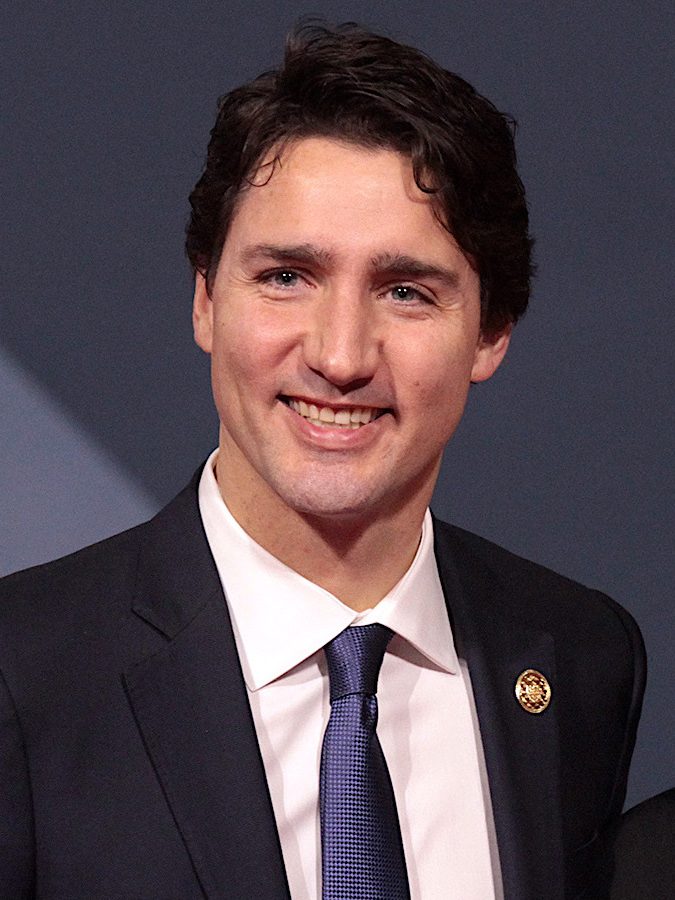
Canada
Justin Trudeau, Prime Minister

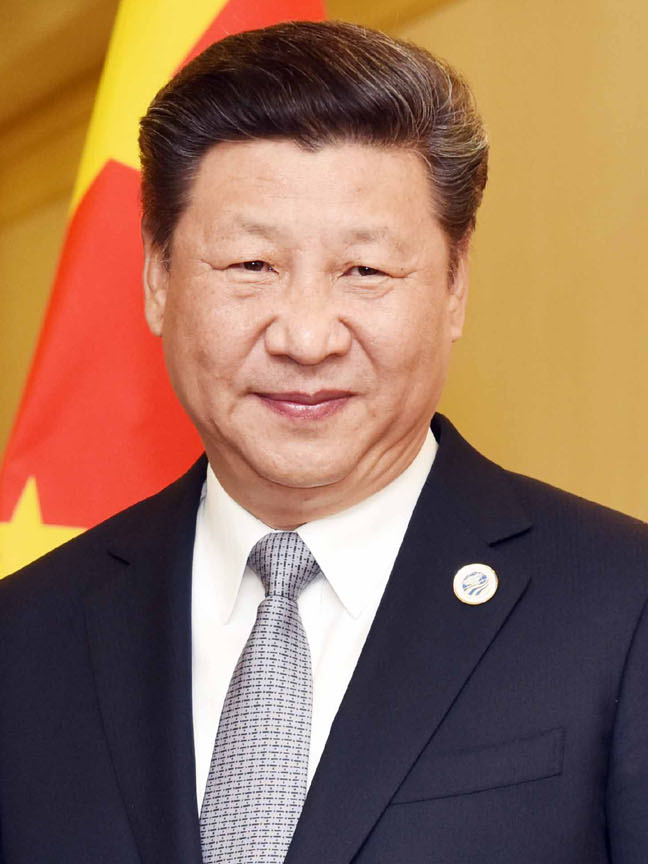
China
Xi Jinping, CCP General Secretary and President (host) (Note: The president of China is legally a ceremonial office, but the general secretary of the Chinese Communist Party (de facto leader in a one-party communist state) has always held this office since 1993 except for the months of transition, and the current general secretary is Xi Jinping, who is also the Chinese president.)

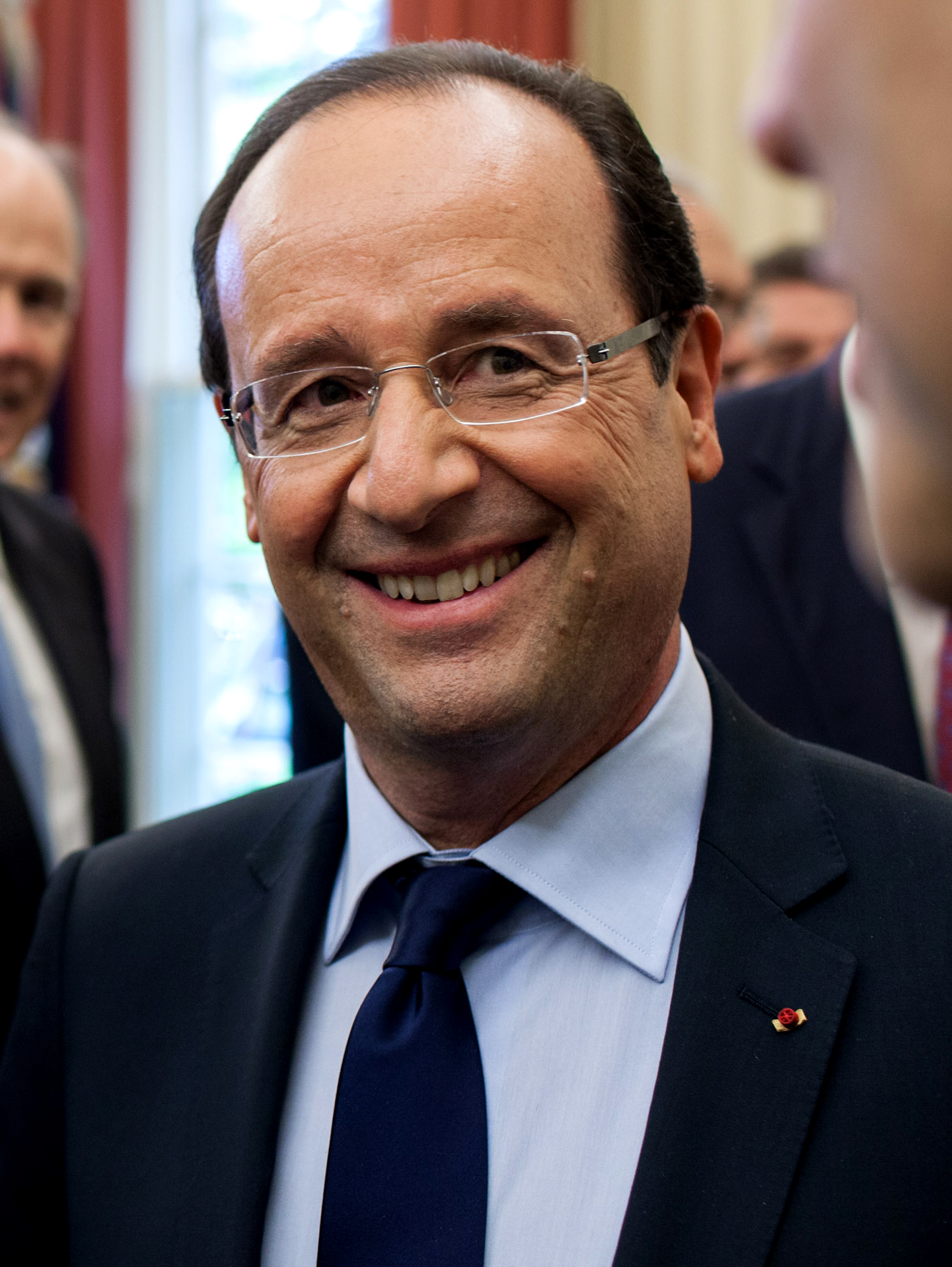
France
François Hollande, President

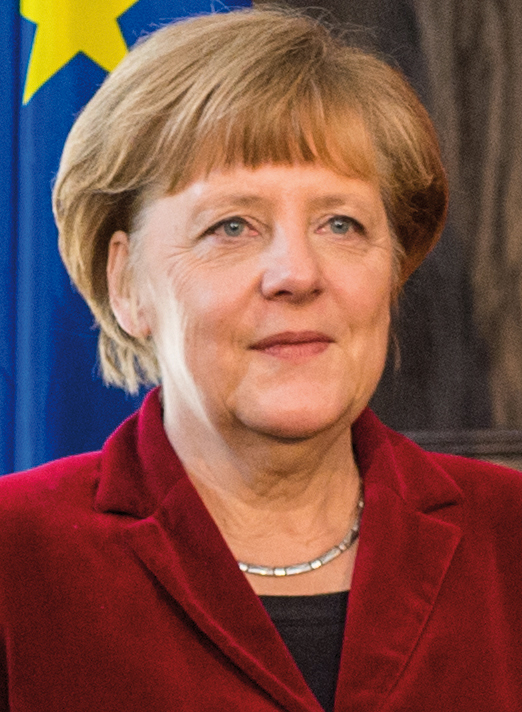
Germany
Angela Merkel, Chancellor

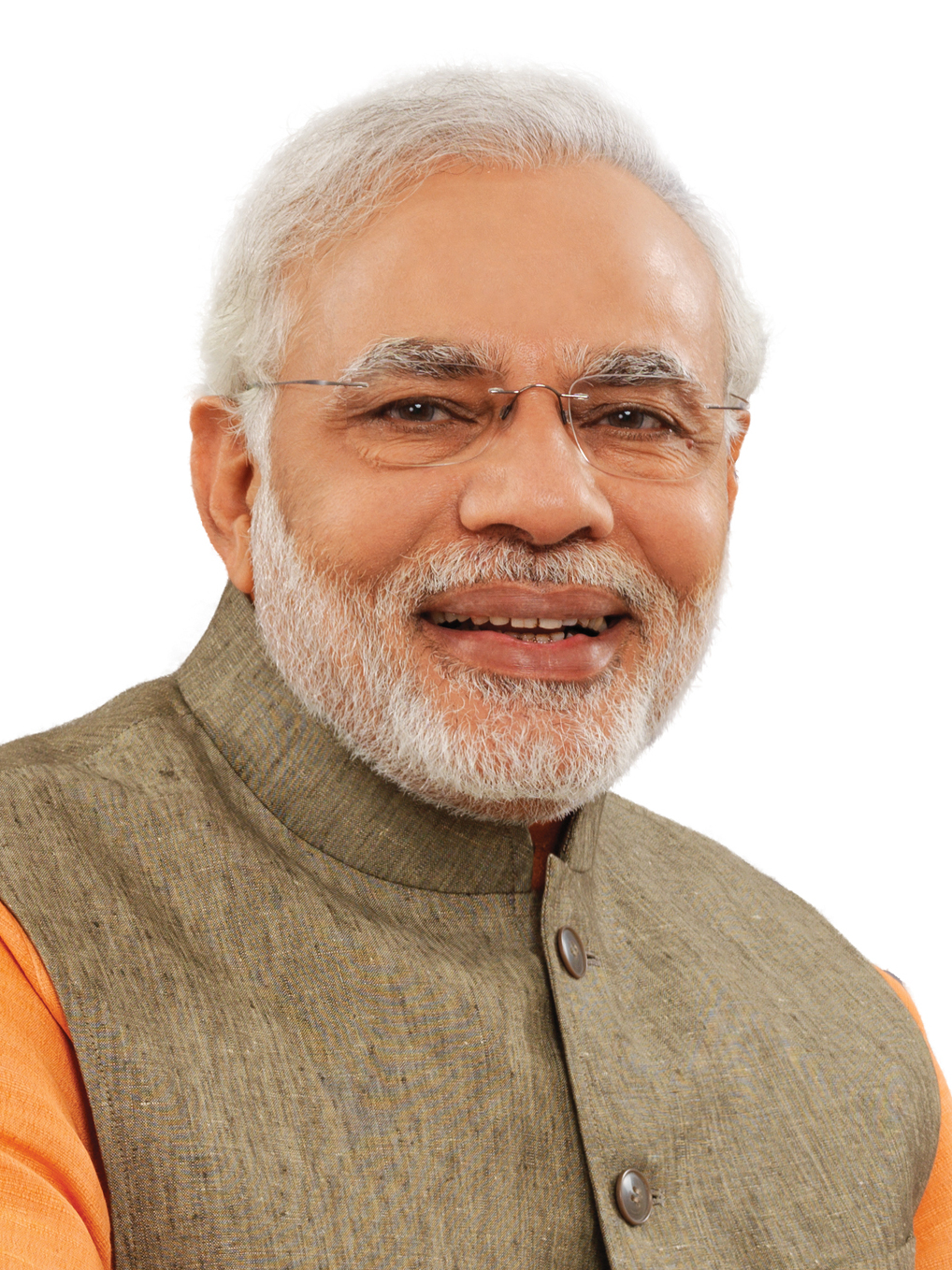
India
Narendra Modi, Prime Minister

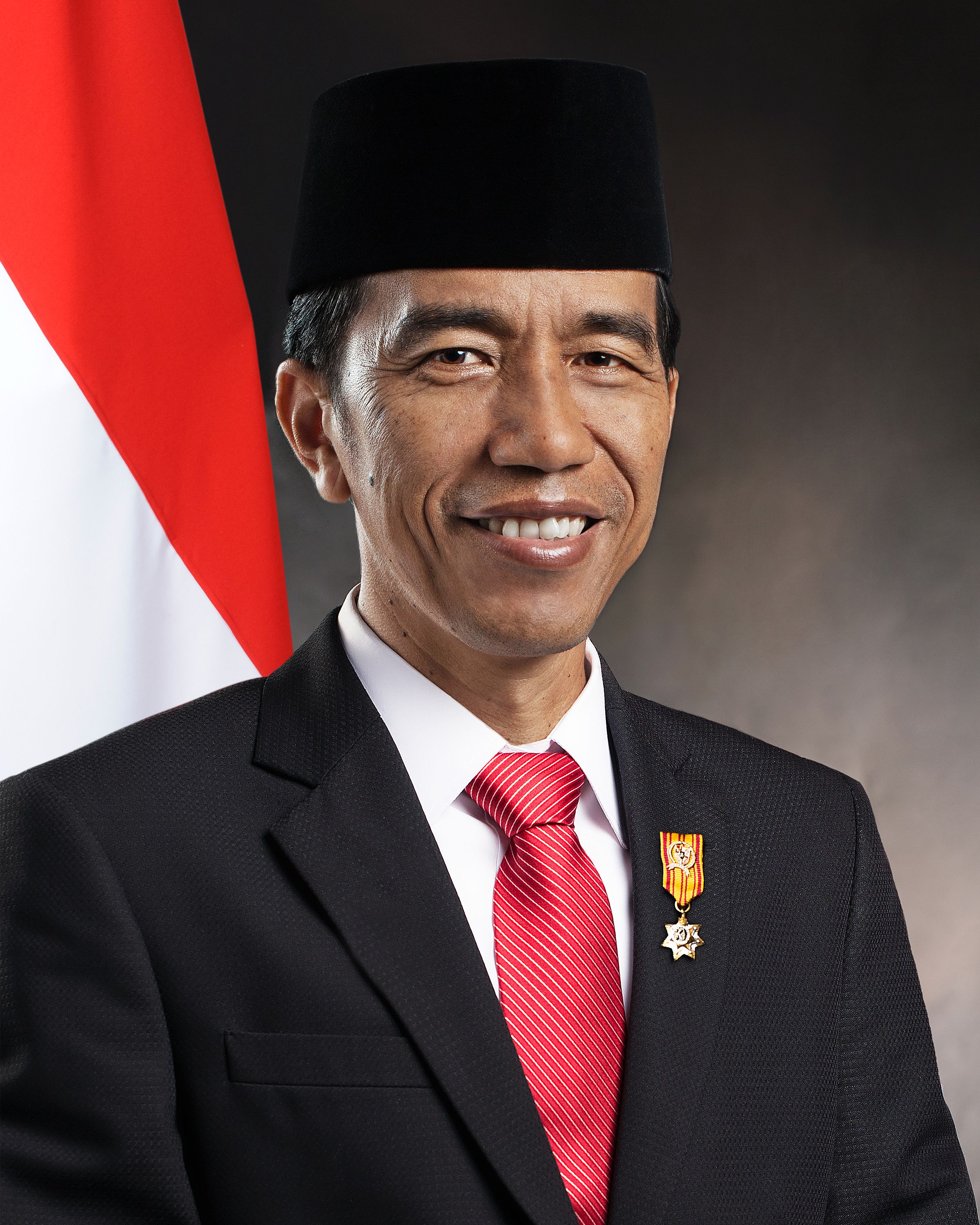
Indonesia
Joko Widodo, President

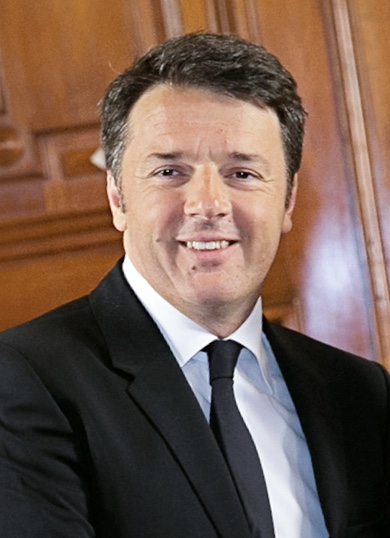
Italy
Matteo Renzi, Prime Minister

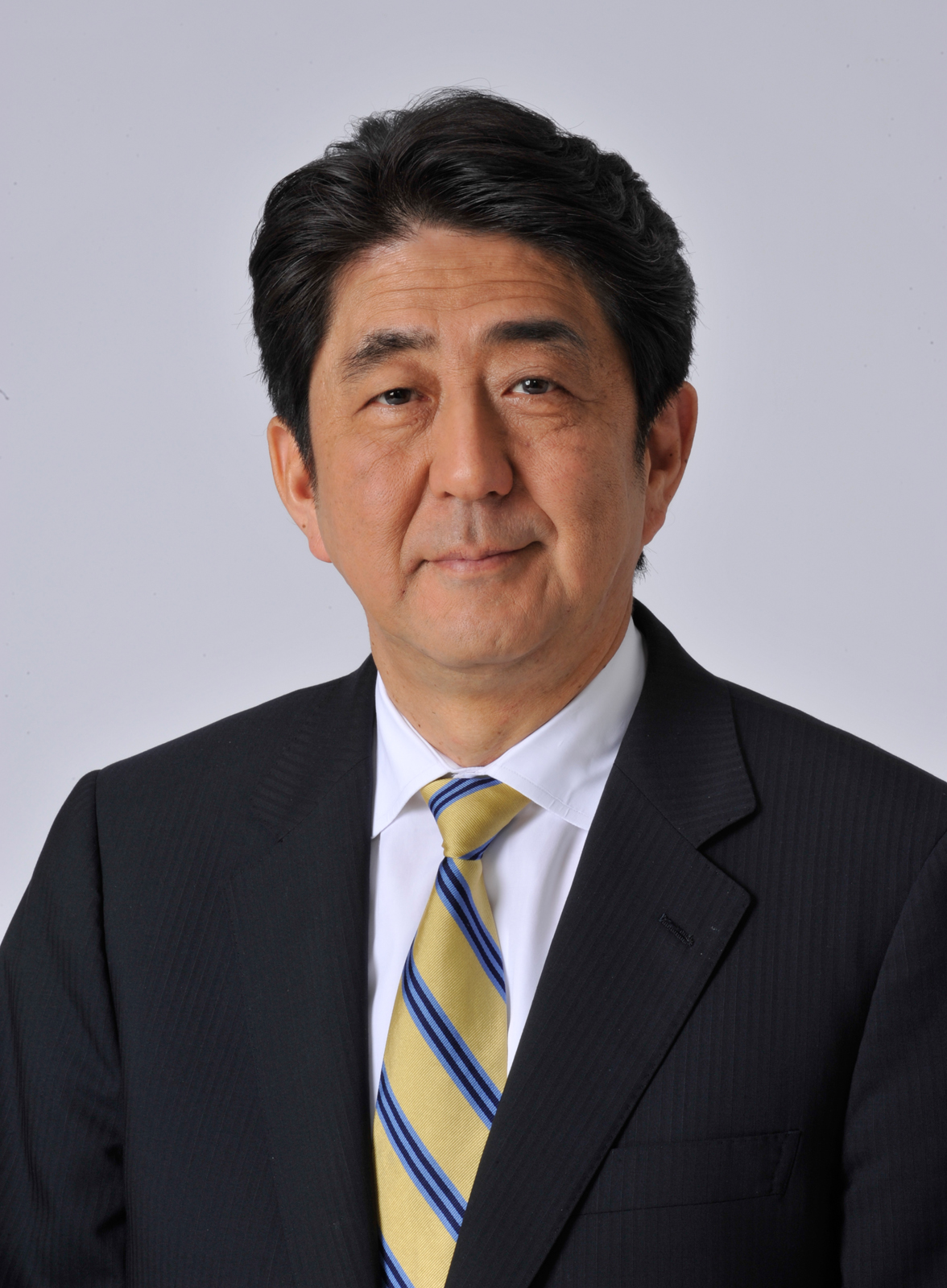
Japan
Shinzō Abe, Prime Minister

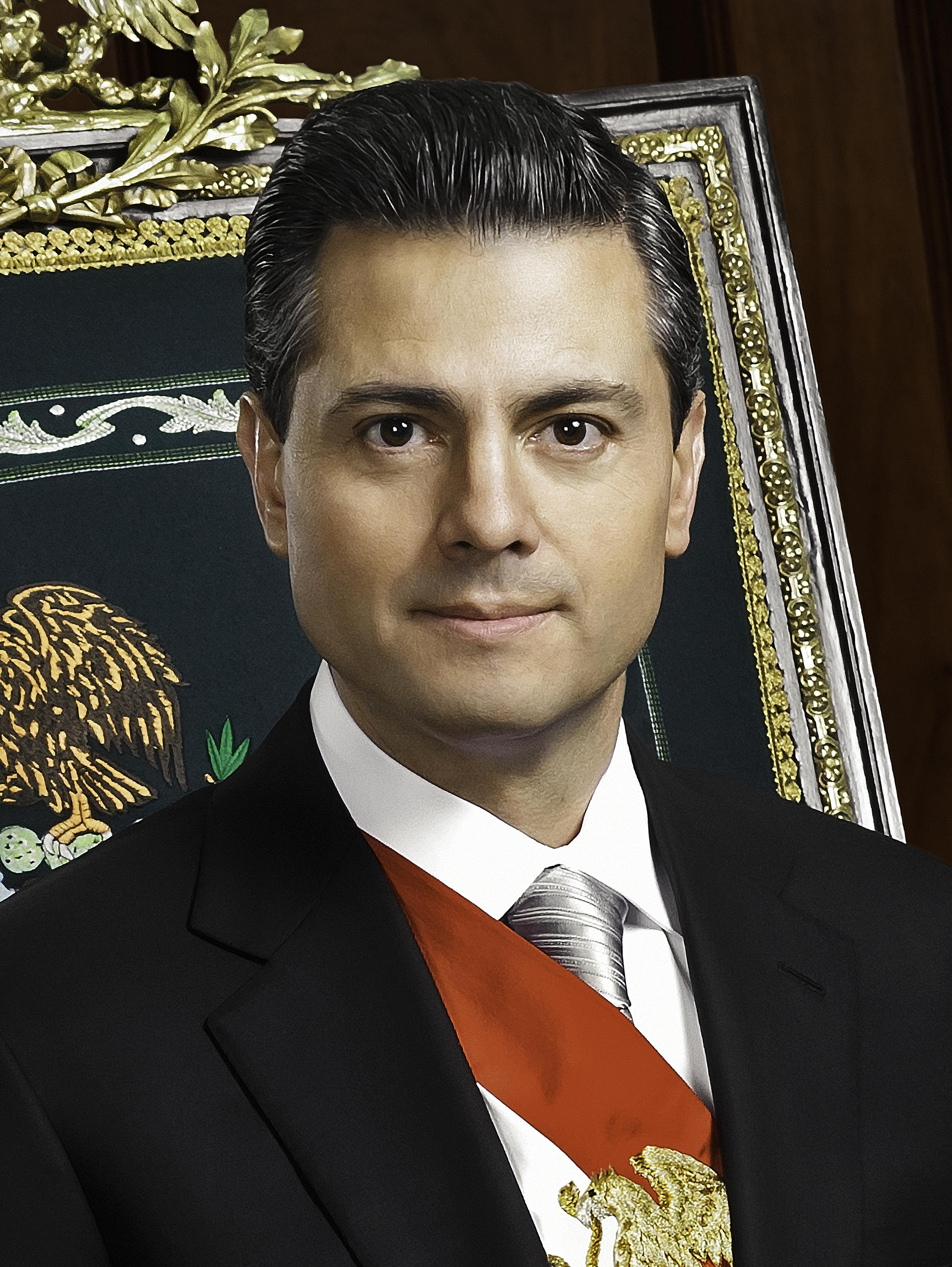
Mexico
Enrique Peña Nieto, President

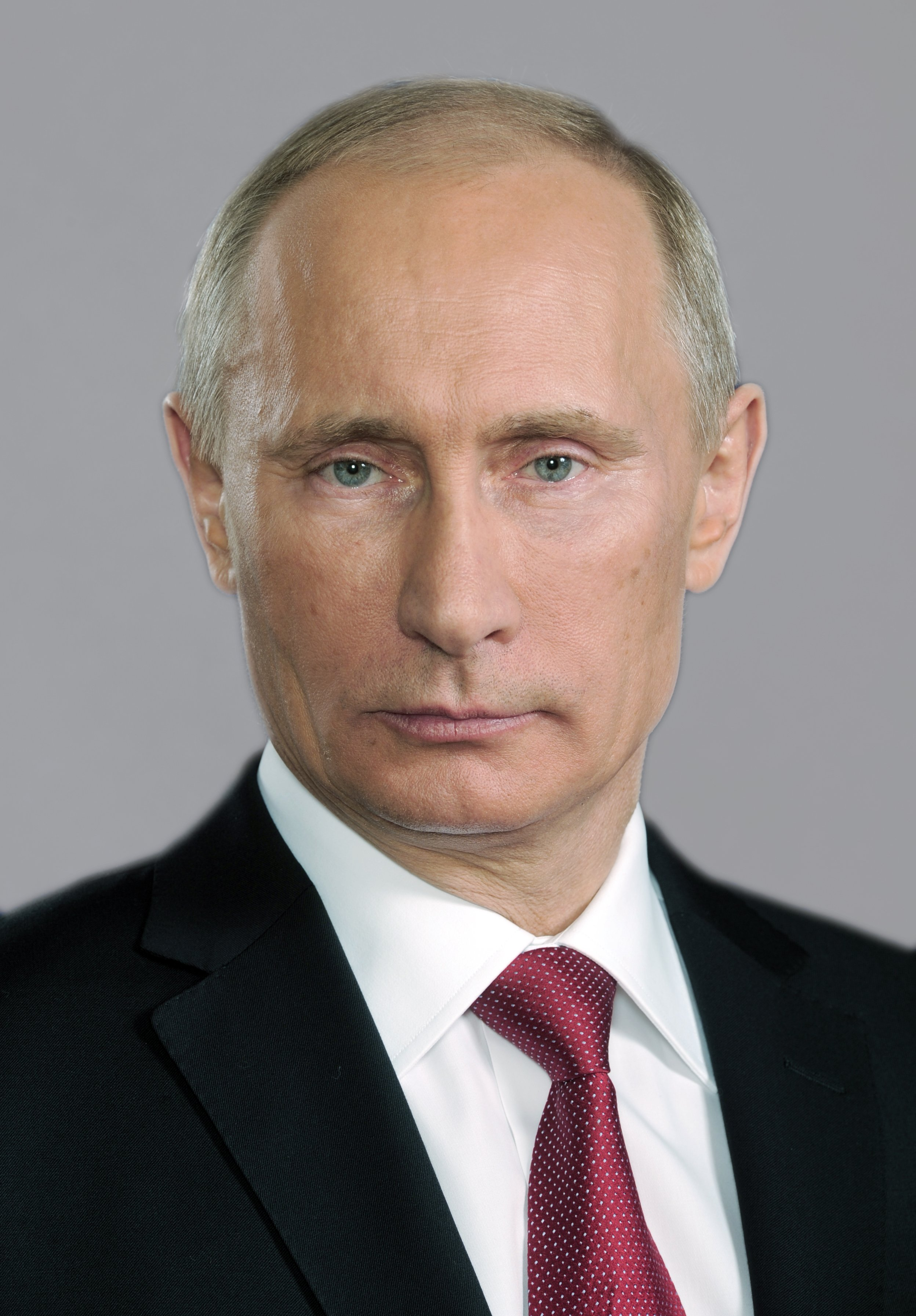
Russia
Vladimir Putin, President

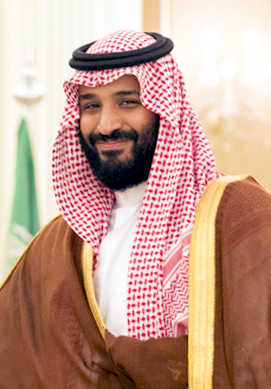
Saudi Arabia
Mohammad bin Salman Al Saud, Deputy Crown Prince

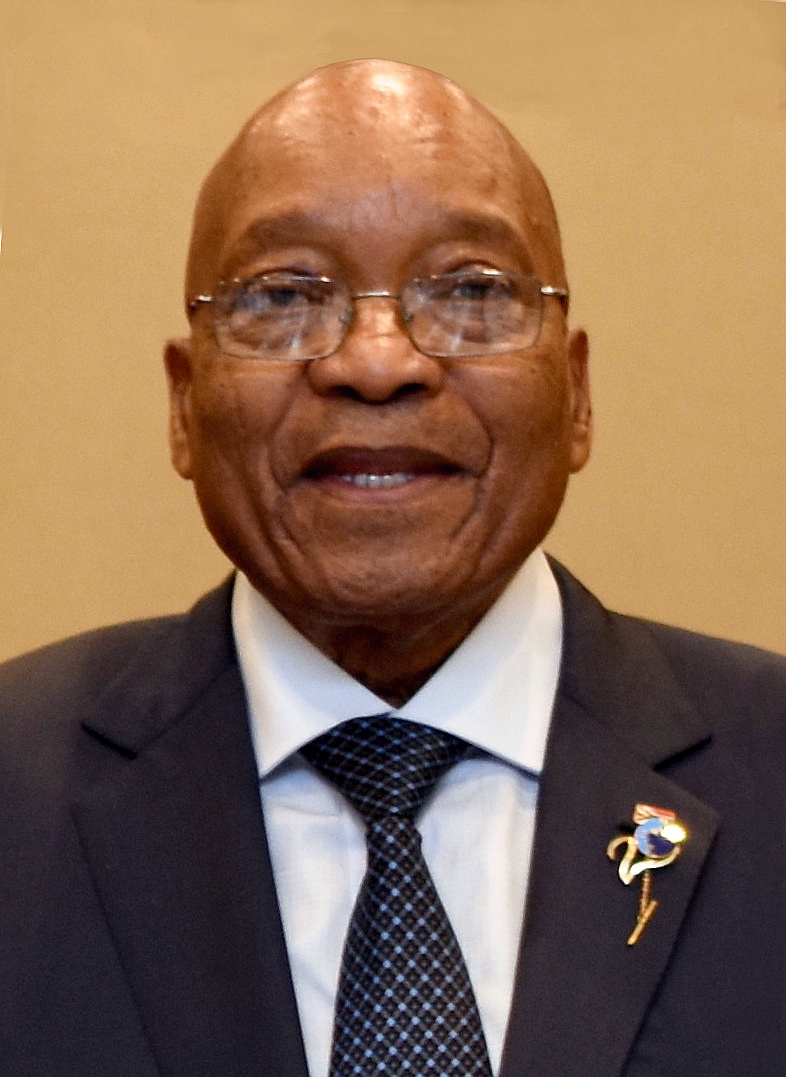
South Africa
Jacob Zuma, President

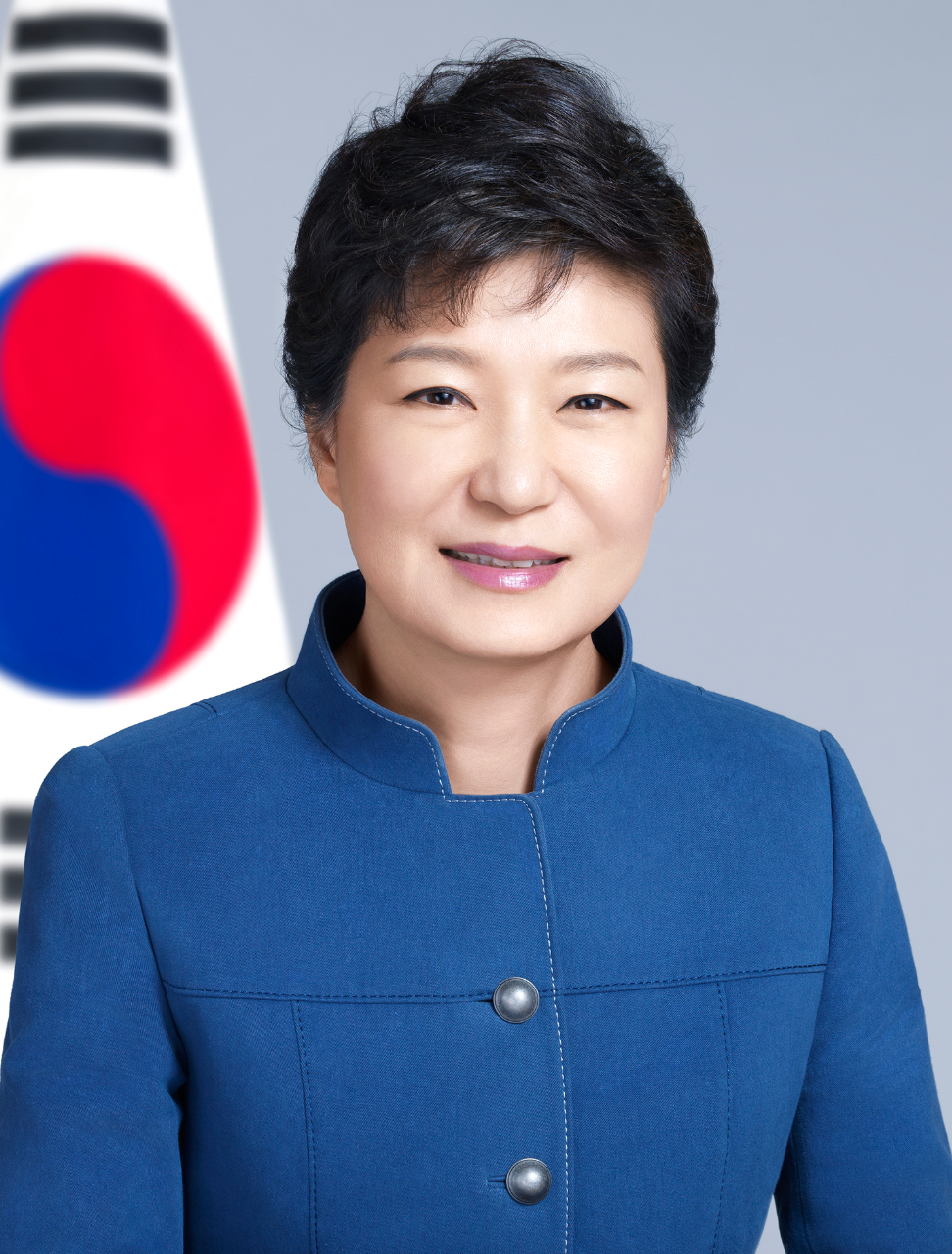
South Korea
Park Geun-hye, President

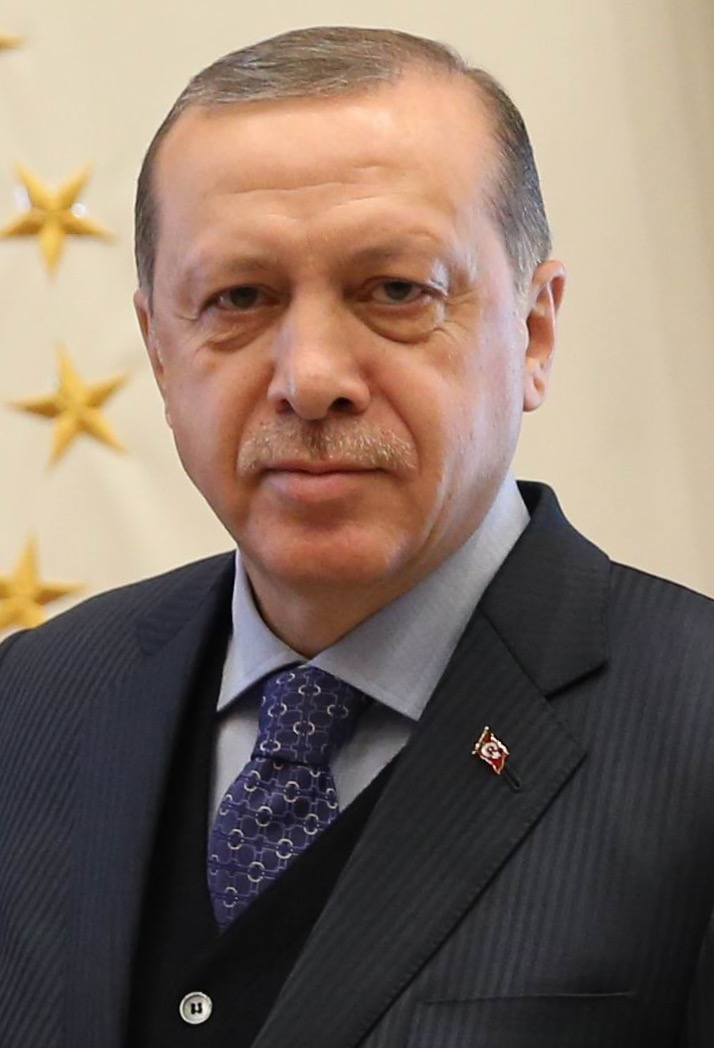
Turkey
Recep Tayyip Erdoğan, President

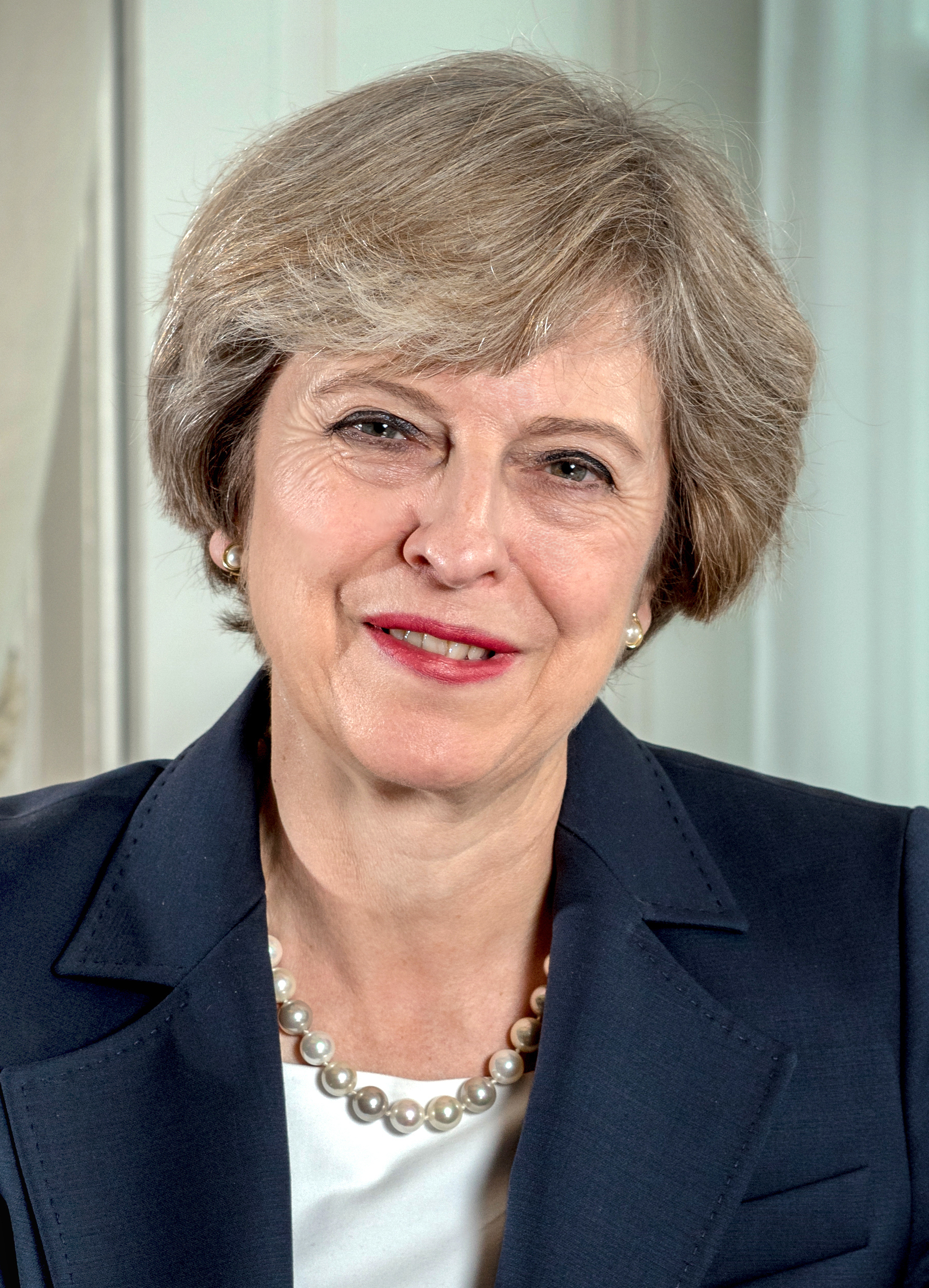
United Kingdom
Theresa May, Prime Minister

United States
Barack Obama, President

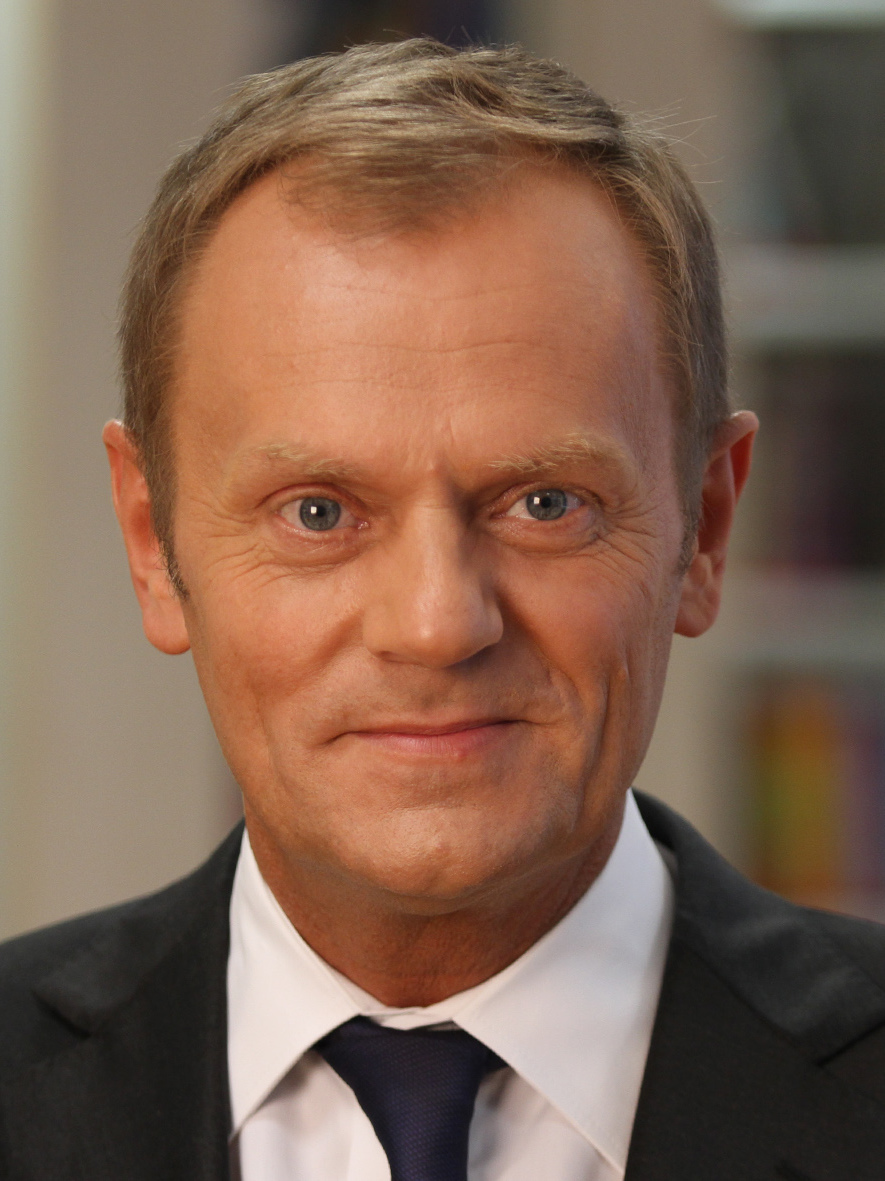
European Union
Donald Tusk, President of the European Council

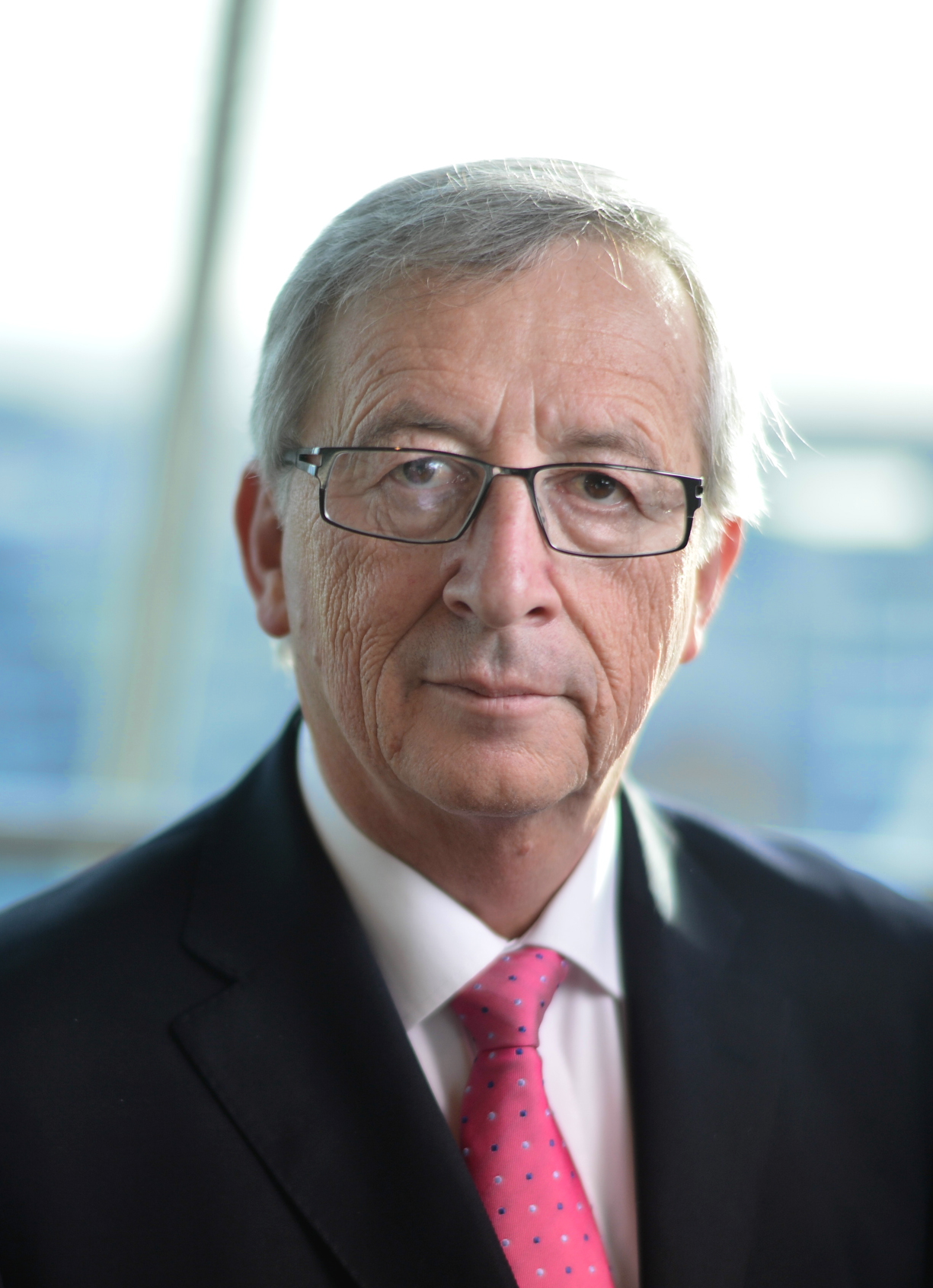
European Union
Jean-Claude Juncker, President of the European Commission

=== Invited guests ===
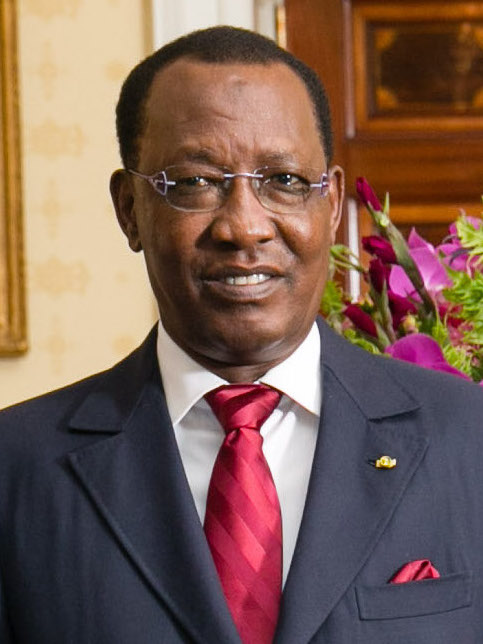
(Chad) Chad
Idriss Déby,
President, chairperson of the African Union for 2016

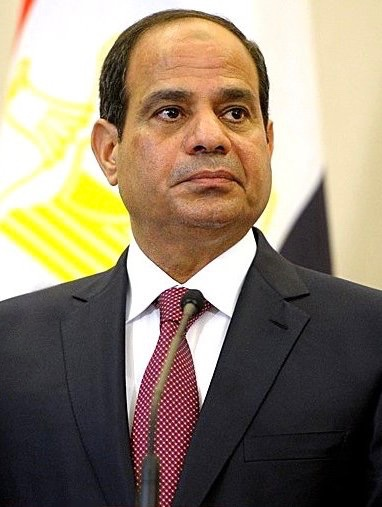
Egypt
Abdel Fattah al-Sisi, President, guest invitee

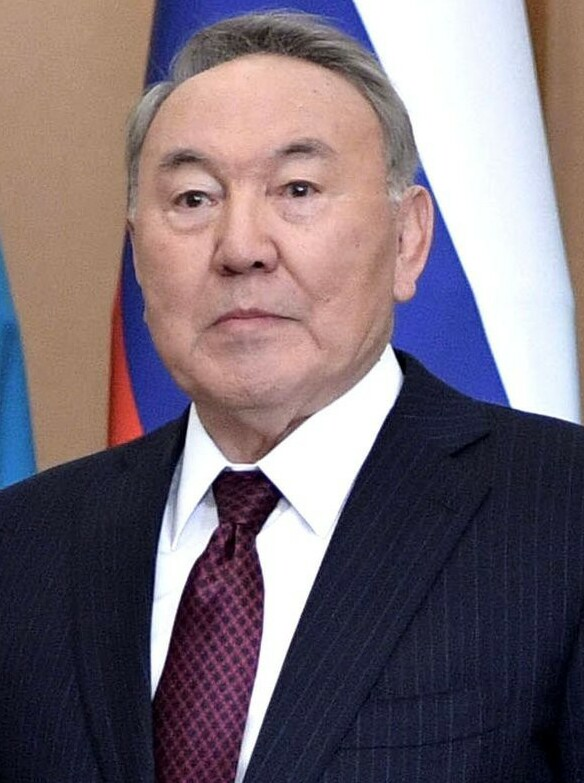
Kazakhstan
Nursultan Nazarbayev, President, guest invitee

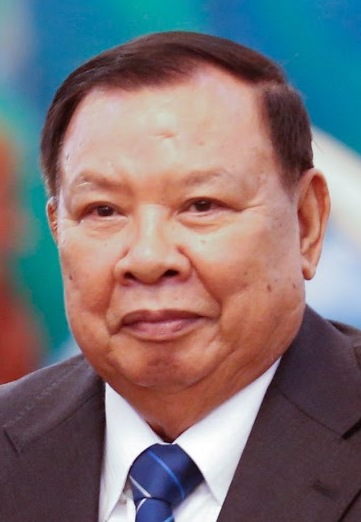
Laos
Bounnhang Vorachith, President, chair of the Association of Southeast Asian Nations for 2016

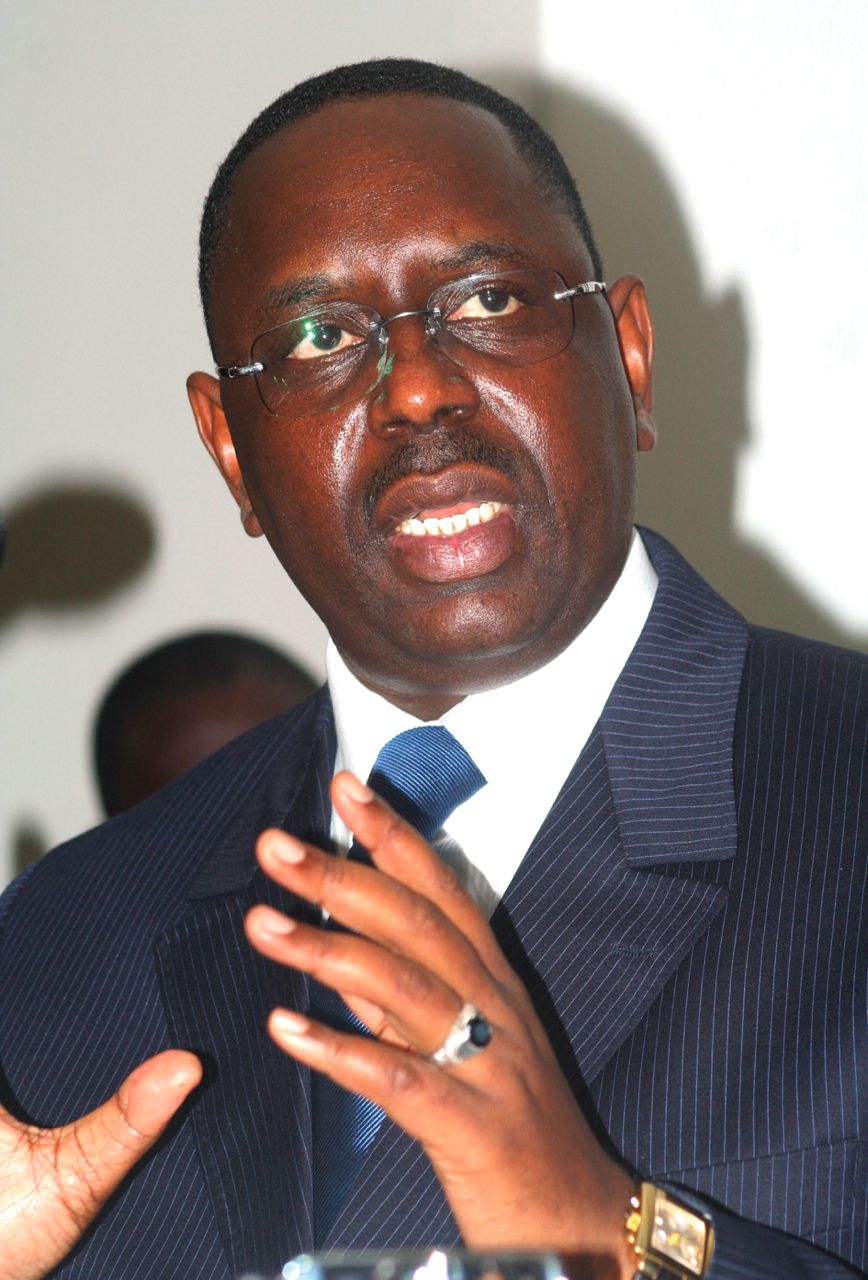
Senegal
Macky Sall, President, president of New Partnership for Africa's Development

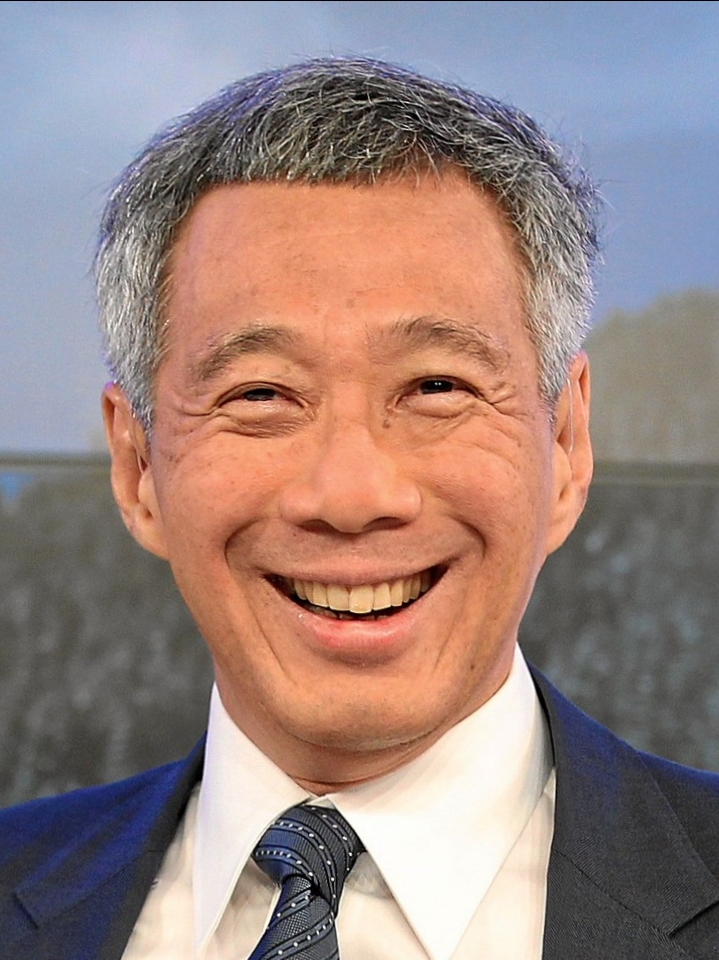
Singapore
Lee Hsien Loong, Prime Minister, guest invitee

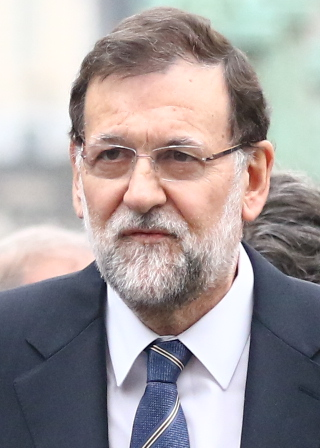
Spain
Mariano Rajoy, Prime Minister, permanent guest invitee

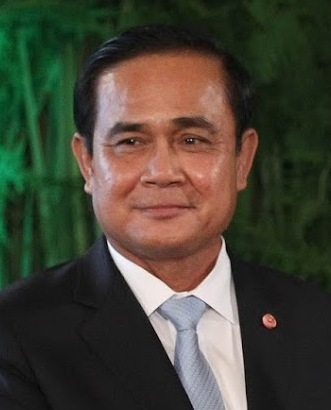
Thailand
Prayut Chan-o-cha, Prime Minister, guest invitee

=== International organizations ===
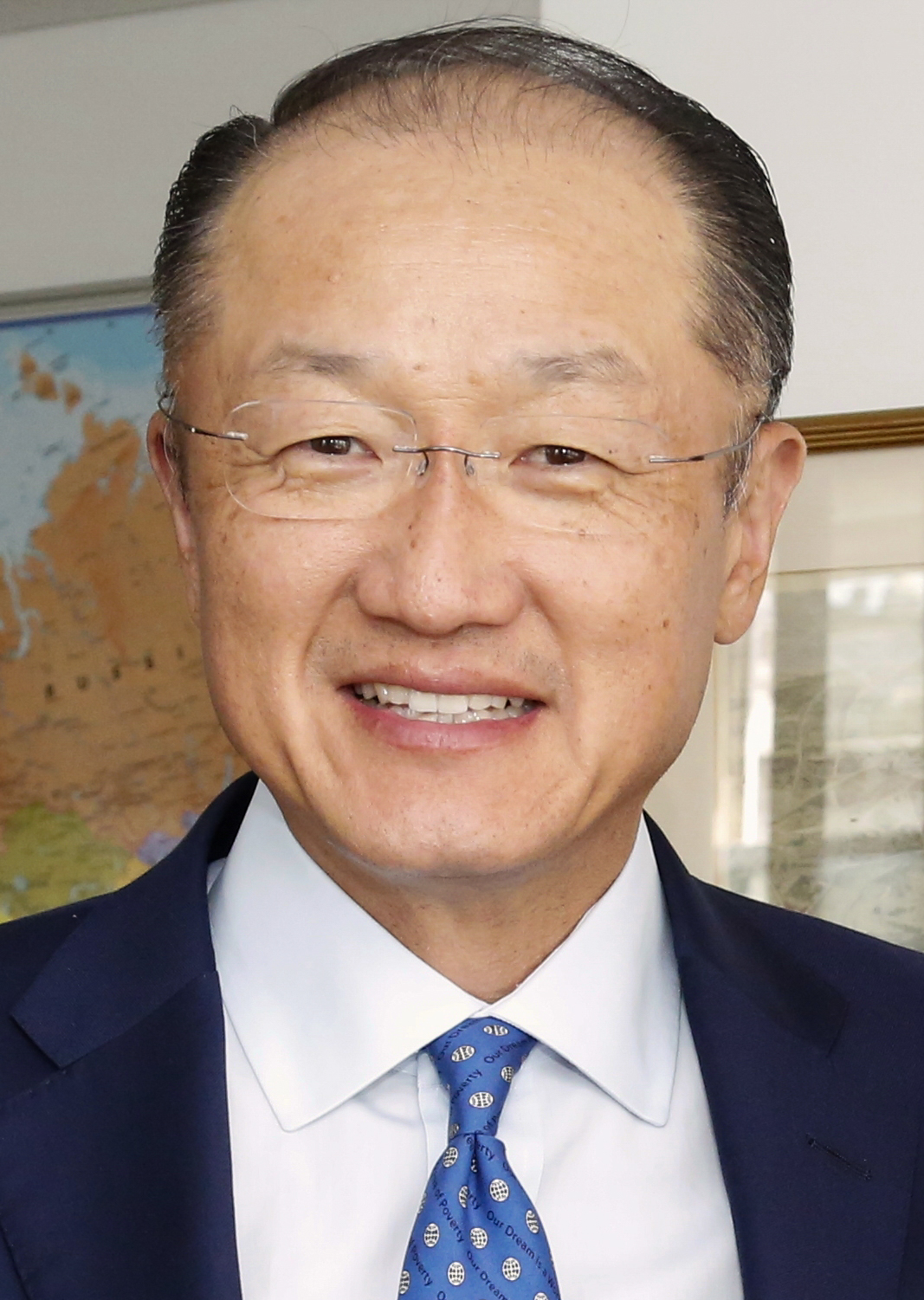
World Bank
Jim Yong Kim, president

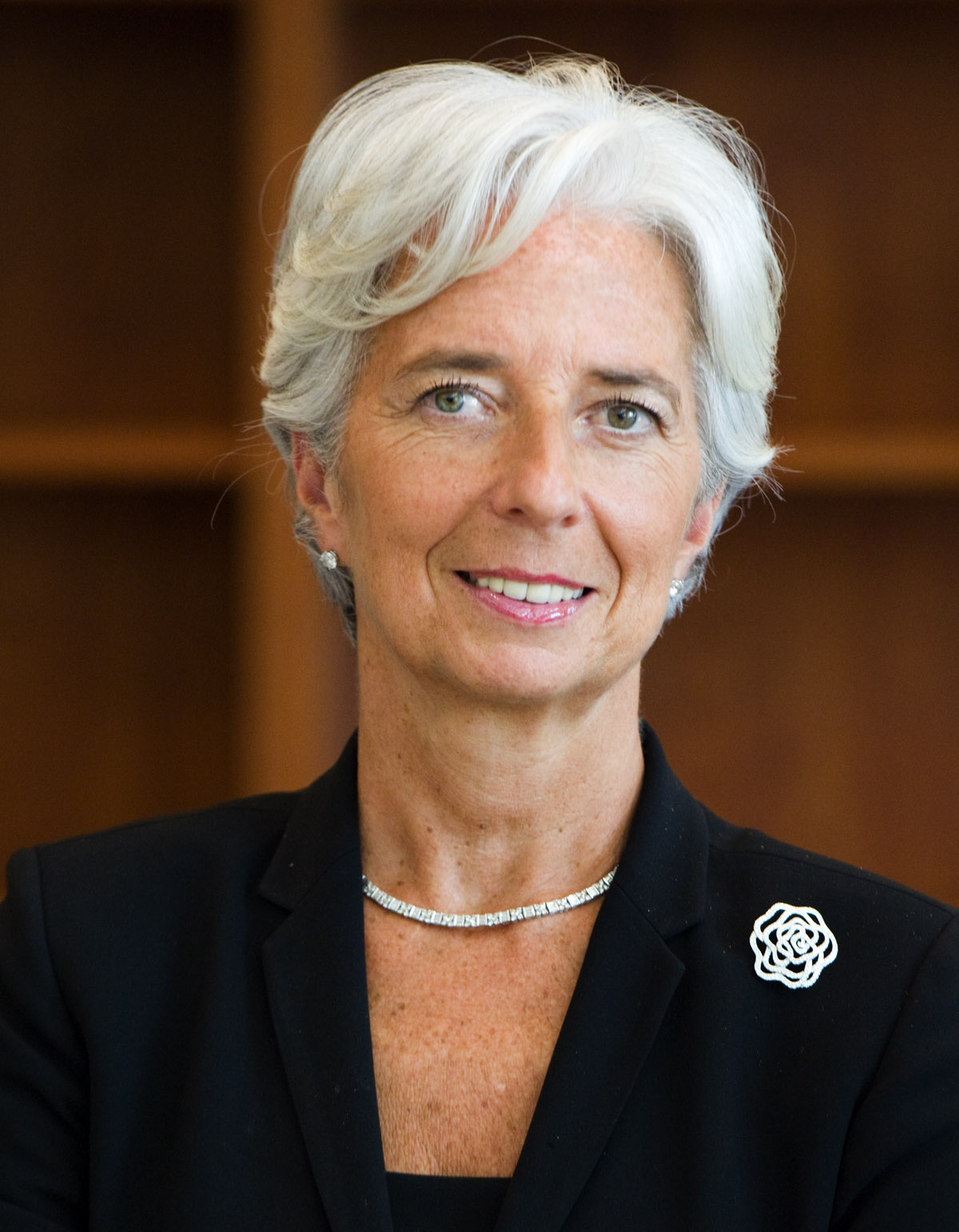
International Monetary Fund
Christine Lagarde, managing director

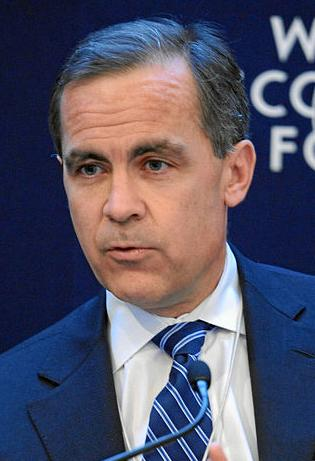
Financial Stability Board
Mark Carney, chairman

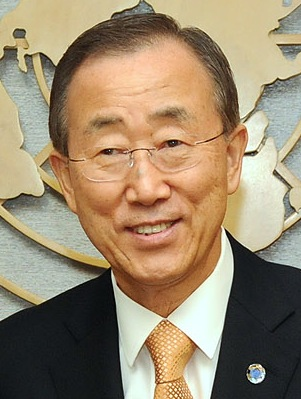
United Nations
Ban Ki-moon, Secretary-General

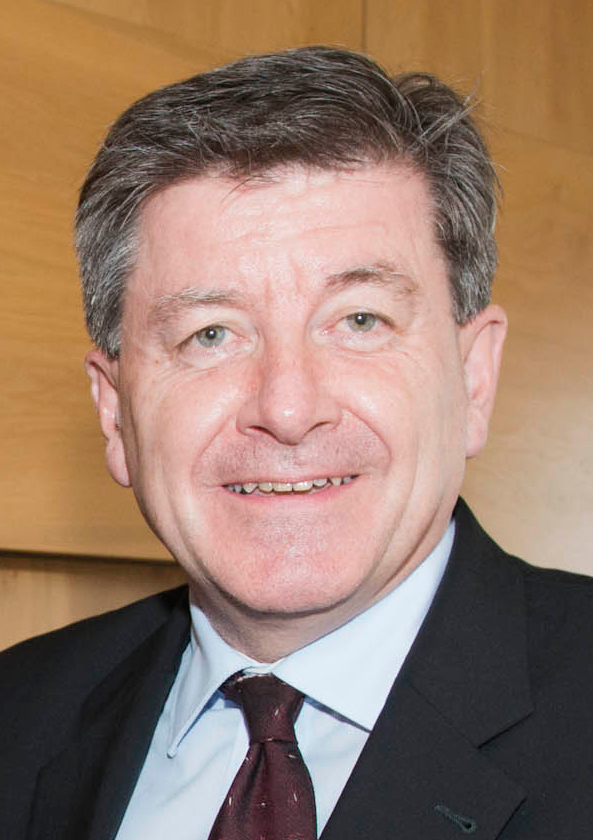
International Labour Organization
Guy Ryder, director-general

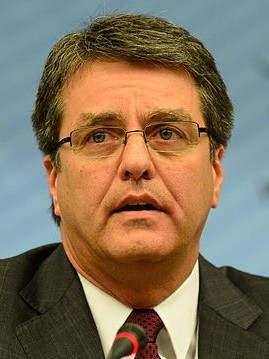
World Trade Organization
Roberto Azevêdo, director-general

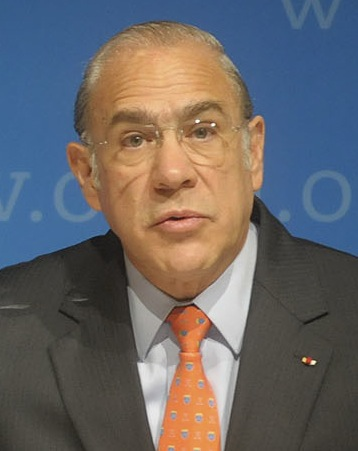
OECD
José Ángel Gurría, secretary-general

== Controversies ==
President Obama was snubbed by CCP General Secretary Xi Jinping and the Chinese Communist Party (CCP) as he descended from Air Force One to the tarmac of Hangzhou International Airport without the usual red carpet welcome.

=== Internet censorship ===
CCP general secretary Xi Jinping in the speech quoted "Guoyu", Traditional Chinese history books, in Chapter 9 of the "通商宽农" (tōng shāng kuān nóng, meaning reducing taxes and make road easy to walk, promote commercialization, and relax agriculture), but he mistakenly pronounced it as "通商宽衣" ("宽衣" kuān yī means Undress), the Central Propaganda Department ordered media and social platforms to prohibit this discussion.

=== Russian hacking of 2016 United States elections ===
In December 2016, President Obama stated that, when Obama was in China in early September 2016, he told Vladimir Putin not to hack the U.S. election infrastructure. Obama stated, "What I was concerned about in particular was making sure the 2016 DNC hack wasn't compounded by potential hacking that could hamper vote counting, affect the actual election process itself." He continued, "So in early September, when I saw President Putin in China, I felt that the most effective way to ensure that that didn’t happen was to talk to him directly and tell him to cut it out and there were going to be serious consequences if he didn’t. And in fact we did not see further tampering of the election process."
