= List of international prime ministerial trips made by Xavier Bettel =

This is a list of international prime ministerial trips made by Xavier Bettel, who served as the Prime Minister of Luxembourg from 4 December 2013 to 17 November 2023.

== Summary ==
Bettel has visited 27 countries during his tenure as prime minister. The number of visits per country where Bettel has traveled are:

- One visit to Albania, Czech Republic, Ireland, Kosovo, Iceland, Italy, Moldova, Portugal, Russia, Serbia, South Korea, Ukraine and Vietnam
- Two visits to Canada, Estonia, Japan, Spain, Tunisia and Vatican City
- Three visits to the Netherlands and Slovenia
- Four visits to Germany and Poland
- Six visits to the United Kingdom and the United States
- Eight visits to France
- Eighteen visits to Belgium

== 2013 ==
Country	Location(s)	Dates	Details
Belgium	Brussels	16 December	First visit. Met with European Council President Van Rompuy for a working lunch and to discuss the European Summit, to be held in Brussels later this week
France	Paris	16 December	Bettel travelled to Paris to meet President Hollande to discuss European and international affairs, including the summit, as well as bilateral relations between both countries.

== 2014 ==
Country	Location(s)	Dates	Details
Netherlands	The Hague	28 January	Bettel met with Prime Minister Mark Rutte in his residence Catshuis. They addressed several topics including bilateral economic cooperation between the two countries. They also discussed several European level subjects as well as the upcoming Benelux Social Summit.
France	Normandy	5–6 June	Bettel travelled to Juno Beach to attend the 70th anniversary of D-Day and the Battle of Normandy.
United Kingdom	Newport, Wales	4–5 September	Bettel attended the 2014 Wales NATO summit.
United States	New York City	26 September	Bettel attended the General debate of the sixty-ninth session of the United Nations General Assembly.

== 2015 ==
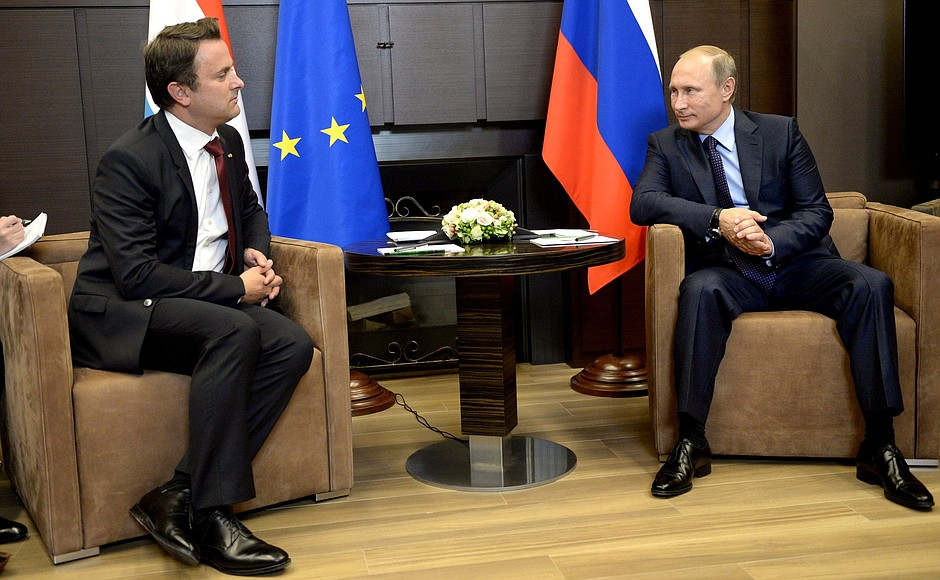
Bettel and Putin (6 October)

Country	Location(s)	Dates	Details
Poland	Oświęcim	27 January	Bettel together with Grand Duke Henri and Grand Duchess Maria Teresa attended the commemoration of the 70th anniversary of the liberation of the Auschwitz concentration camp.
Japan	Tokyo	16–18 July	Met with Prime Minister Shinzo Abe. They discussed various bilateral issues, current events in the European Union, as well as the relationship between the European Union and Japan following the EU-Japan Summit on 29 May in this year. Bettel chose Japan as his first country to visit outside the European Union (EU) since Luxembourg assumed the presidency of the Council of the EU in July.
Vatican City	Vatican City	17 September	Met with Pope Francis to strengthen Holy See-Luxembourg ties, discuss Church-State relations, religious freedom, EU issues, conflicts, migration, and aid for refugees and persecuted minorities.
Russia	Sochi	6 October	Official visit. Met with President Vladimir Putin. The discussion covered bilateral cooperation and the international agenda, as well as prospects for relations between Russia and the EU in view of Luxembourg’s Presidency of the Council of the European Union.
United Kingdom	London	27 October	Met with Prime Minister David Cameron at 10 Downing Street. They discussed bilateral relations and European and International political current affairs.

== 2016 ==
Country	Location(s)	Dates	Details
Poland	Warsaw	8–10 July	Bettel travelled to Warsaw to attend the 27th NATO Summit.
Germany	Berlin	30–31 August	Bettel focused on innovation, media, and start-up ecosystems during a visit to Berlin. The visit included meetings and site visits aimed at strengthening cooperation in the creative and digital sectors between Luxembourg and Germany.
United States	New York City	23 September	Bettel attended the General debate of the seventy-first session of the United Nations General Assembly.
Tunisia	Tunis	6 December	Bettel visits the country together with his Benelux counterparts.

== 2017 ==
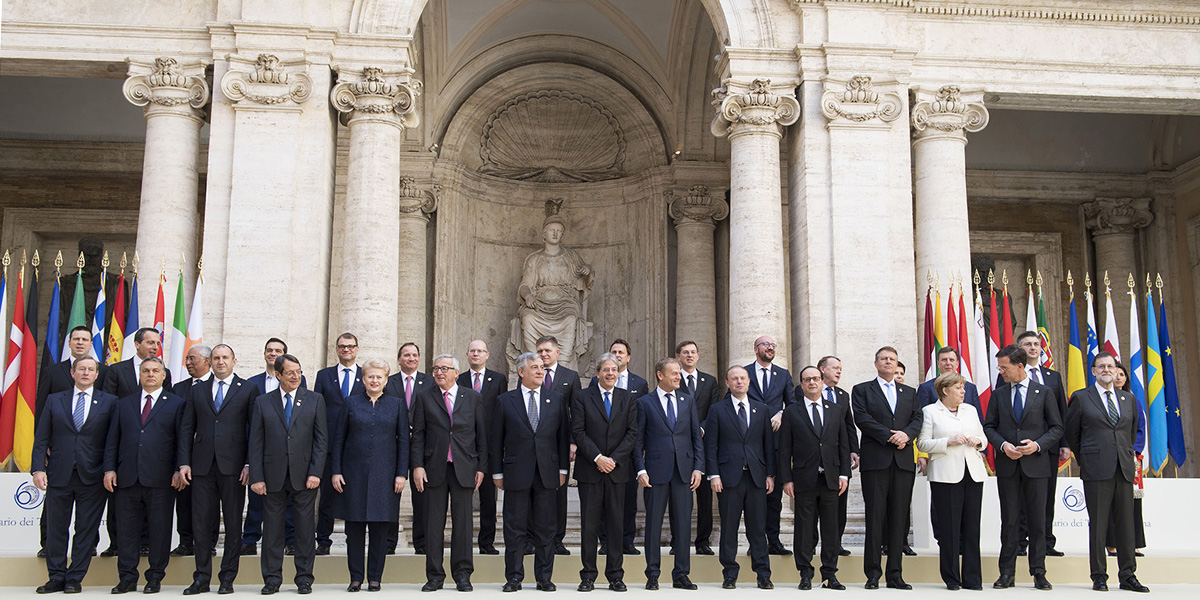
Treaty of Rome anniversary group photograph 2017-03-25 03

Country	Location(s)	Dates	Details
Estonia	Tallinn	17 March	Met with Prime Minister Jüri Ratas for an interview at Stenbock House, and spoke with Eiki Nestor, President of the Estonian State Assembly. The discussions covered bilateral relations, the upcoming Estonian Presidency of the Council of the European Union as well as topical political events in Europe and globally.
Vatican City	Vatican City	24 March	Bettel visits the Vatican with his 27 EU-counterparts.
Italy	Rome	25 March	Bettel attends the Rome Treaty celebration.
Canada	Ottawa	18–20 April	Bettel travelled to Ottawa to meet with Prime Minister Justin Trudeau to discuss issues of mutual interest, strengthen commercial ties, and explore how to harness innovation and technology to create jobs in both countries, including by taking advantage of opportunities created by the Canada-European Union Comprehensive Economic and Trade Agreement (CETA).
Belgium	Brussels	24–26 May	Bettel travelled to Brussels to attend the 28th NATO summit.
Poland	Warsaw	19 June	Bettel met with his Benelux and Visegrad counterparts.
Netherlands	The Hague	20 June	Bettel attended Benelux Meeting with Baltic and Nordic countries at The Hague
Estonia	Tallinn	28 September	Bettel attended Tallinn Digital Summit.
Netherlands	The Hague	9 November	Bettel attended the Benelux summit.

== 2018 ==
Country	Location(s)	Dates	Details
Slovenia	Ljubljana	5–6 February	Attended Benelux-Slovenia Summit.
Ireland	Dublin	5 March	Met with the Irish Prime Minister Leo Varadkar. They discussed about the bilateral relations between the two countries, but also about the future of the European Union and particularly Brexit.
United Kingdom	London	14 March	Met with Prime Minister Theresa May, at 10 Downing Street. They discussed bilateral relations between the two countries, as well as European and international politics.
Belgium	Brussels	11–12 July	Bettel travelled to Brussels to attend the 29th NATO summit.

== 2019 ==
Country	Location(s)	Dates	Details
United Kingdom	Portsmouth	5 June	Bettel travelled to Portsmouth to attend the 75th anniversary of D-Day commemorative ceremonies. Trudeau met with Prime Minister Theresa May.
Belgium	Brussels	20–21 June	Bettel attended the European Council.
France	Paris	17 September	Met with President Emmanuel Macron.
United States	New York City	26 September	Attended General debate of the seventy-fourth session of the United Nations General Assembly.
United Kingdom	London, Watford	3–4 December	Bettel travelled to Watford to attend the 30th NATO summit.

== 2020 ==
Country	Location(s)	Dates	Details
France	Paris	10 January	Met with President Emmanuel Macron.
Poland	Oświęcim	27 January	Bettel together with Grand Duke Henri attended the commemoration of the 75th anniversary of the liberation of the Auschwitz concentration camp.
Belgium	Brussels	16–20 July	Bettel attended an extraordinary European Council to decide the EU economic response to the COVID-19 recession which deeply affected the continent. The summit was among the longest ones in history. The meetings focused on negotiating the EU coronavirus recovery plan and the long-term EU budget.
Belgium	Brussels	1–2 October	Bettel attended an extraordinary European Council.

== 2021 ==
Country	Location(s)	Dates	Details
Portugal	Porto	7–8 May	Bettel attended the EU Social Summit.
Belgium	Brussels	13–14 June	Bettel travelled to Brussels to attend the 31st NATO summit.
Belgium	Brussels	24–25 June	Bettel attended the European Council.
United States	New York City	24 September	Bettel attended the General debate of the seventy-sixth session of the United Nations General Assembly.
Slovenia	Ljubljana	5–6 October	Bettel attended an informal European Council and the EU-Western Balkans summit.
Germany	Berlin	18 October	Met with Chancellor Angela Merkel. They talked about issues to be addressed by the European Council at the end of the week. These include the rising energy prices and the digital agenda. Merkel said that the rule of law was also an important topic.
Belgium	Brussels	21–22 October	Bettel attended the European Council.
United Kingdom	Glasgow	1–2 November	Bettel attended the 2021 United Nations Climate Change Conference.

== 2022 ==
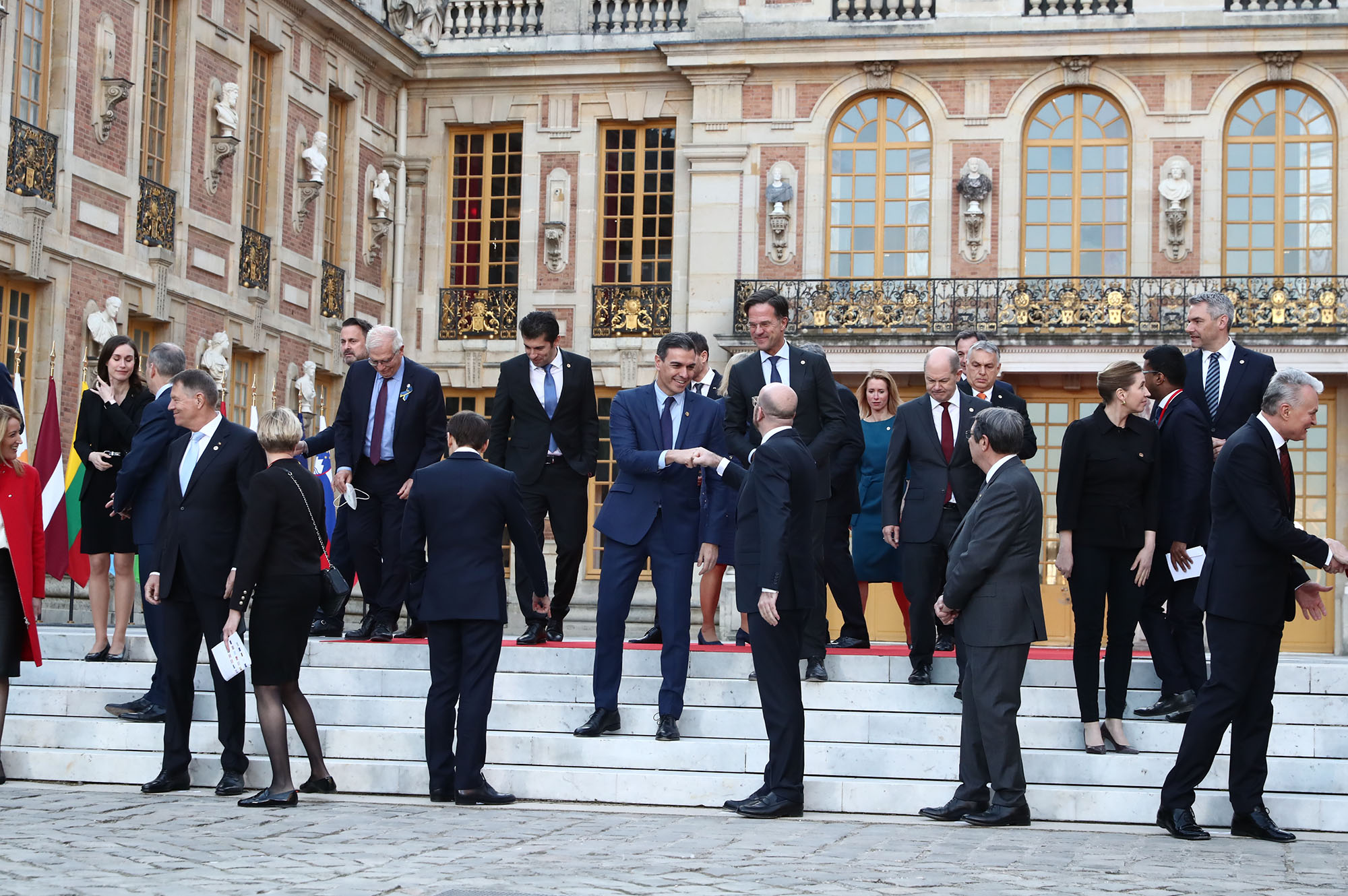
Heads of government preparing to take a group photo at the 2022 Versailles informal summit of EU Heads of State and Government.

Country	Location(s)	Dates	Details
Belgium	Brussels	24 February	Bettel attended a special meeting of the European Council to discuss the Russian invasion of Ukraine.
Germany	Berlin	1 March	Met with Chancellor Olaf Scholz.
France	Versailles	10–11 March	Participation in the informal meeting of EU Heads of State and Government.
Belgium	Brussels	23–24 March	Bettel travelled to Brussels to attend the extraordinary NATO summit to discuss the Russian invasion of Ukraine. He also attended the European Council.
Ukraine	Kyiv	21 June	Met with President Volodymyr Zelenskyy. They discussed the restoration of Ukraine. The issue of reconstruction will be discussed in more detail at a conference in Lugano, Switzerland, in July this year, and Luxembourg will be involved.
Belgium	Brussels	23–24 June	Bettel attended in Brussels an EU-Western Balkans Leaders meeting, a European Council and a Euro summit.
Spain	Madrid	28–30 June	Bettel travelled to Madrid to attend the 32nd NATO summit.
United States	New York City	23 September	Bettel attended the General debate of the seventy-seventh session of the United Nations General Assembly.
Czech Republic	Prague	6–7 October	Bettel attended at Prague Castle the 1st European Political Community Summit and an informal European Council.
Japan	Tokyo	18 October	Met with Prime Minister Fumio Kishida. They held talks focusing on strengthening bilateral relations, including economic cooperation, finance, and innovation. They also discussed Russia's aggression against Ukraine, cooperation within the G7, and broader global challenges such as maintaining a rules-based international order, addressing security issues, regional issues including China and North Korea, and strongly condemned ballistic missile launches by North Korea which has been conducted at an extremely high frequency, including the launch of a ballistic missile that passed over Japan on the 4 October. They confirmed that they would continue to work together in addressing North Korea, including the abductions issue. They further exchanged views on deepening ties between Japan and Luxembourg in the international arena.
Belgium	Brussels	20–21 October	Bettel attended the European Council.
Canada	Ottawa	1 November	Met with Prime Minister Justin Trudeau. They discussed Russia’s illegal and unjustifiable invasion of Ukraine and its global impacts on food and energy security, among others. They agreed on the importance of maintaining strong unity amongst allies to increase support to those impacted, in Ukraine and internationally.
Tunisia	Djerba	19–20 November	Bettel travelled to Djerba to attend the Organisation internationale de la Francophonie Summit.
Albania	Tirana	6 December	Attended EU-Western Balkans summit.
Belgium	Brussels	15 December	Bettel attended the European Council.

== 2023 ==
Country	Location(s)	Dates	Details
Belgium	Brussels	9–10 February	Bettel attended the European Council.
Slovenia	Ljubljana	22 February	Met the Prime Minister Robert Golob. They reaffirmed their desire to deepen bilateral relations between Luxembourg and Slovenia, particularly in the economic field. In particular, they highlighted possible cooperation in the field of European quantum communication infrastructure, in particular with regard to satellites, as well as cooperation between the Luxembourg Wood Cluster and the Slovenian Industry Wood Cluster.
Vietnam	Hanoi	3–5 May	He held talks with Prime Minister Phạm Minh Chính on strengthening bilateral relations, economic and financial cooperation, and European Union–Vietnam relations. The visit included the signing of agreements, notably in green finance, as well as meetings with senior officials and participation in a business forum. Bettel also attended cultural and commemorative events marking the 50th anniversary of diplomatic relations and took part in economic engagements, including discussions with business representatives and visits related to financial cooperation and sustainable development.
Iceland	Reykjavík	16–17 May	Bettel attended the 4th Council of Europe summit.
Germany	Berlin	22 May	Met with Chancellor Olaf Scholz. They discussed European issues, including the multiannual financial framework, economic governance and institutional reform of the European Union. They also discussed current international issues, in particular Russia's war of aggression against Ukraine and relations between Europe and China. Finally, they discussed bilateral issues, such as cross-border cooperation.
Moldova	Chișinău, Bulboaca	1 June	Bettel attended the 2nd European Political Community Summit.
Belgium	Brussels	29–30 June	Bettel attended the European Council.
Serbia	Belgrade	3 July	Bettel visits Serbian prime minister Aleksandar Vučić together with Dutch prime minister Mark Rutte in light of the increasing tensions between Serbia and Kosovo
Kosovo	Pristina	4 July	Bettel visits Kosovan president Vjosa Osmani and Kosovan prime minister Albin Kurti together with Dutch prime minister Mark Rutte in light of the increasing tensions between Serbia and Kosovo
Lithuania	Vilnius	11–12 July	Bettel attended the 33rd NATO summit.
Belgium	Brussels	17–18 July	Attended the 3rd EU–CELAC summit.
South Korea	Seoul, Busan	25–27 July	Bettel paid an official visit to South Korea, where he met with President Yoon Suk-yeol to discuss strengthening bilateral relations, economic cooperation, and ties between Europe and Asia. The discussions covered cooperation in trade, investment, and innovation, as well as broader international issues. During the visit, Bettel participated in events marking the 70th anniversary of the Korean War Armistice, including memorial ceremonies honoring veterans and those who served during the conflict. He also met with representatives of Korean businesses to promote economic partnerships and highlight opportunities for cooperation between Luxembourg and South Korea. The visit emphasized both the historical ties between the two countries and their shared commitment to international cooperation, security, and strengthening relations with partners in the Indo-Pacific region.
United States	New York City	22 September	Bettel attended the General debate of the seventy-eighth session of the United Nations General Assembly.
Spain	Granada	5–6 October	Bettel attended the 3rd European Political Community Summit.

== Multilateral meetings ==
Xavier Bettel participated in the following summits during his premiership:

Group	Year									
Group	2014	2015	2016	2017	2018	2019	2020	2021	2022	2023
UNGA	26 September, (United States) New York City	25–30 September, (United States) New York City	23 September, (United States) New York City	21 September, (United States) New York City	26 September, (United States) New York City	26 September, (United States) New York City	26 September, (videoconference) (United States) New York City	24 September, (United States) New York City	23 September, (United States) New York City	22 September, (United States) New York City
NATO	4–5 September, (United Kingdom) Newport	None	8–9 July, (Poland) Warsaw	25 May, (Belgium) Brussels	11–12 July, (Belgium) Brussels	3–4 December, (United Kingdom) Watford	None	14 June, (Belgium) Brussels	24 March, (Belgium) Brussels	11–12 July, (Lithuania) Vilnius
NATO	4–5 September, (United Kingdom) Newport	None	8–9 July, (Poland) Warsaw	25 May, (Belgium) Brussels	11–12 July, (Belgium) Brussels	3–4 December, (United Kingdom) Watford	None	14 June, (Belgium) Brussels	28–30 June, (Spain) Madrid	11–12 July, (Lithuania) Vilnius
EU–CELAC	None	10 June, (Belgium) Brussels	None	26–27 October, (El Salvador) San Salvador	None					17–18 July, (Belgium) Brussels
OIF	29–30 November, (Senegal) Dakar	none	26–27 November, (Madagascar) Antananarivo	none	11–12 October, (Armenia) Yerevan	none	none	none	19–20 November, (Tunisia) Djerba	none
EPC	Didn't exist								6 October, (Czech Republic) Prague	1 June, (Moldova) Bulboaca
EPC	Didn't exist								6 October, (Czech Republic) Prague	5 October, (Spain) Granada
██ = Did not attend
