= List of international prime ministerial trips made by António Costa =

Foreign trips made by António Costa as Prime minister of Portugal between 2016 and 2017.

This is the list of international prime ministerial trips made by António Costa, who served as the 119th Prime Minister of Portugal from 26 November 2015 to April 2 2024.

== 2015 ==
Country	Location(s)	Dates	Details
France	Paris	30 November	António Costa attended the 2015 United Nations Climate Change Conference.
Belgium	Brussels	17–18 December	António Costa attended the European Council meeting.

== 2016 ==
Country	Location(s)	Dates	Details
Cape Verde	Praia	17-19 January	António Costa, on his first official visit to Cape Verde as Prime Minister, was accompanied by the Minister of Foreign Affairs, Augusto Santos Silva, and the Minister of Culture, João Soares.
Germany	Berlin	5 February	António Costa visited Chancellor Angela Merkel to discuss the budget and refugees, among other topics.
Belgium	Brussels	18–20 February	António Costa attended the European Council meeting.
Belgium	Brussels	17–18 March	António Costa attended the European Council meeting.
Greece	Athens	11-12 April	Met with Greek counterpart Alexis Tsipras in the afternoon at the Eleonas refugee camp in Athens. In an interview with the newspaper Ekathimerini, Costa advocated for "more Europe".
France	Paris	10–12 June	The Prime Minister celebrated Portugal Day outside of national territory for the first time.
France	Paris	18 June	Costa attended to the game Portugal vs Austria of UEFA Euro 2016.
Belgium	Brussels	28–29 June	António Costa attended the European Council meeting.
France	Paris	30 June	Costa attended to the game Portugal vs Poland of UEFA Euro 2016.
France	Paris	6 July	Costa attended to the game Portugal vs Wales of UEFA Euro 2016.
Poland	Warsaw	8–9 July	António Costa attended the 2016 Warsaw NATO summit.
France	Paris	10 July	The Prime Minister attended the final of the 2016 European Football Championship, in which Portugal won against France.
Brazil	São Paulo	5–8 September	The Prime Minister was in São Paulo for a four-day visit, which included economic and cultural events. At the end of the first day, Costa met with the Governor of São Paulo.
Greece	Athens	9 September	Prime Minister António Costa was in Athens for a summit of leaders from southern European Union countries, where they prepared for the informal EU member states summit scheduled for the following week.
Slovakia	Bratislava	16 September	Informal summit in the Slovak capital, Bratislava, where the Prime Minister met with several European leaders.
Sweden	Stockholm	3 October	Met with Prime Minister Stefan Lövfen. They discussed bilateral relations – which are celebrating 375 years.
China	Beijing	8–12 October	He was on a five-day official visit to China, with stops in Shanghai and Macau, and an institutional agenda that included a meeting with Xi Jinping.
Belgium	Brussels	20–21 October	António Costa attended the European Council meeting.
Colombia	Cartagena de Indias	29–30 October	Costa attended the XXV Ibero-American Summit.
Brazil	Brasília	31 October–1 November	Costa attended the XI CPLP Summit and the XII Portugal–Brazil Summit.
Spain	Madrid	14 November	Despite the political instability in Spain, King Felipe VI and Queen Letizia opened the doors of the royal palace and offered a dinner in honor of Marcelo Rebelo de Sousa.
Morocco	Marrakesh	15-16 November	António Costa participated in the climate change conference held in Marrakesh. He was also in Casablanca for a meeting with Portuguese and Moroccan business leaders.
United States	New York City	12 December	Costa attended the swearing-in ceremony of the new Secretary-General of the United Nations, António Guterres.
Belgium	Brussels	15 December	Costa attended an informal meeting of EU heads of state or government.

== 2017 ==
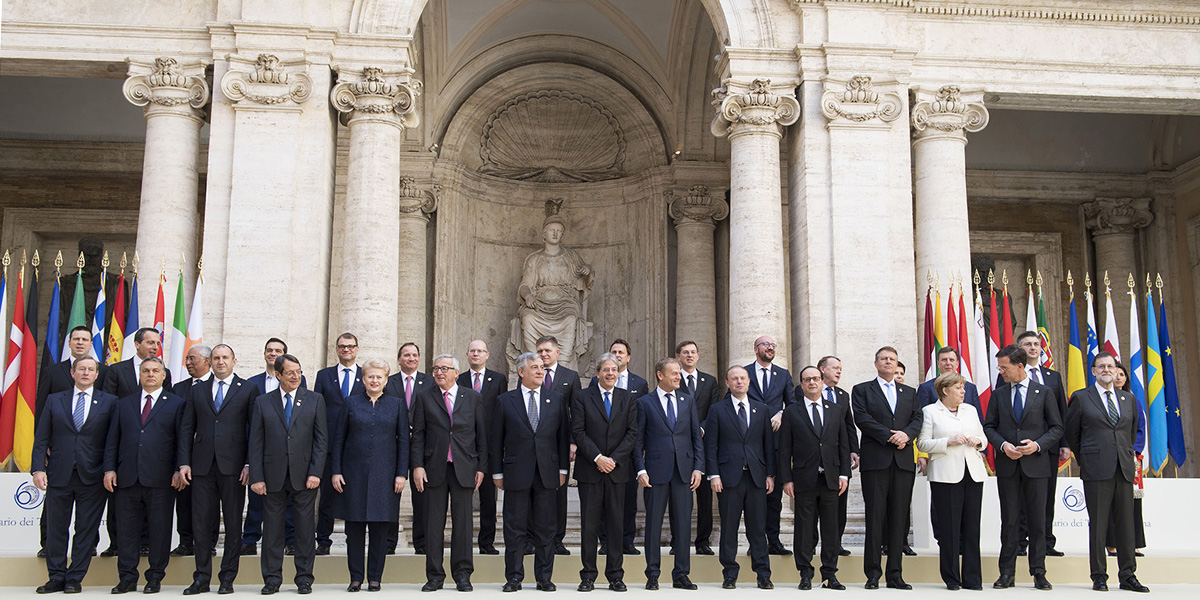
Treaty of Rome anniversary group photograph 2017-03-25 03

Country	Location(s)	Dates	Details
India	New Delhi, Bangalore, Ahmedabad, Goa	6–12 January	Costa made a State Visit to India.
Malta	Valletta	3 February	Costa attended an informal European Council meeting.
Central African Republic	Bangui	12 February	Costa made a surprise visit to Portuguese military personnel participating in the UN MINUSCA mission.
Cape Verde	Praia	20 February	Costa participate in the IV Portugal–Cape Verde Summit.
Belgium	Brussels	9 March	Costa attended the European Council meeting.
Vatican City	Vatican City	24 March	Costa visits the Vatican with his 27 EU-counterparts.
Italy	Rome	25 March	Costa attends the Rome Treaty celebration.
Luxembourg	Luxembourg City	5 April	Costa made an official bilateral visit, and met with Prime Minister Xavier Bettel.
Spain	Madrid	10 April	Costa participate in the Southern European Countries Summit.
Qatar	Doha	8 May	Costa made an official 24-hour visit, and met with Emir Tamim bin Hamad Al Thani.
Belgium	Brussels	25 May	Costa attended the 2017 Brussels NATO summit.
Brazil	São Paulo, Rio de Janeiro	10–11 June	Costa participate in the Portugal Day celebrations.
Argentina	Buenos Aires	12–13 June	Costa made an official visit and met with President Mauricio Macri.
Chile	Santiago	14–15 June	Costa made an official visit and met with President Michelle Bachelet.
Belgium	Brussels	22–23 June	Costa attended the European Council meeting.
France	Paris	28 July	Costa made a working visit and met with President Emmanuel Macron at the Élysée Palace.
Belgium	Brussels	19–20 October	Costa attended the European Council meeting.
Sweden	Gothenburg	17 November	Costa participate in the Social Summit for Fair Jobs and Growth.
Tunisia	Tunis	20–21 November	Costa attended the 4th Portugal–Tunisia Summit.
Ivory Coast	Abidjan	29–30 November	Costa attended the 5th African Union–European Union Summit.
Morocco	Rabat	4–5 December	Costa attended the 13th Portugal–Morocco Summit.
Belgium	Brussels	14–15 December	Costa attended the European Council meeting.

== 2018 ==
Country	Location(s)	Dates	Details
Italy	Rome	10 January	Costa attended the 4th MED7 Summit.
Switzerland	Davos	23–26 January	Costa attended the 48th World Economic Forum.
Belgium	Brussels	31 January	Costa had multiple european institutional meetings.
Belgium	Brussels	22–23 February	Costa attended an informal meeting of EU leaders.
Belgium	Brussels	22–23 March	Costa attended the European Council and Euro Summit.
France	Paris, Richebourg and La Couture	8–9 April	Costa attended the centenary commemorations of the Battle of La Lys.
United Kingdom	London	10–11 April	Costa had a bilateral meeting with Prime Minister Theresa May at 10 Downing Street.
Canada	Ottawa, Kingston, Toronto and Montreal	1–5 May	Costa made a State Visit to Canada.
Bulgaria	Sofia	16–17 May	Costa attended an informal European Council meeting and the EU–Western Balkans Summit.
United States	Boston, Providence, San Francisco, Sacramento, New York City, Newark	10–16 June	Costa attended the Portugal Day celebrations and had an official programme.
Russia	Saransk	25 June	Costa watched the game Portugal vs Iran of 2018 FIFA World Cup.
Belgium	Brussels	28–29 June	Costa attended the European Council and Euro Summit.
Belgium	Brussels	11–12 July	Costa attended the 2018 Brussels NATO summit.
Angola	Luanda	17–18 September	Costa made an official bilateral visit.
Austria	Salzburg	19–20 September	Costa attended an informal European Council meeting.
Belgium	Brussels	17–18 October	Costa attended the European Council meeting.
Mexico	Mexico City, Guadalajara	1–2 December	Costa made an official visit for the inauguration of President Andrés Manuel López Obrador, with further engagements in Guadalajara.
Belgium	Brussels	13–14 December	Costa attended the final European Council meeting and the Euro Summit.

== 2019 ==
Country	Location(s)	Dates	Details
Cyprus	Nicosia	29 January	Costa attended the 5th MED7 Summit.
Belgium	Brussels	21–22 March	Costa attended the European Council meeting.
Belgium	Brussels	10 April	Costa attended an extraordinary European Council meeting.
Romania	Sibiu	9 May	Costa attended an informal European Council meeting.
Belgium	Brussels	28 May	Costa participated in the informal dinner of EU heads of state and government following the European Parliament elections.
Cape Verde	Mindelo	11 June	Costa participated in the celebrations of Portugal Day, Camões and the Portuguese Communities.
Malta	Valletta	14 June	Costa attended the 6th MED7 Summit.
Belgium	Brussels	20–21 June	Costa attended the European Council and Euro Summit.
Belgium	Brussels	30 June–2 July	Costa attended an extraordinary European Council meeting.
Belgium	Brussels	17–18 October	Costa attended the European Council meeting.
France	Paris	25 November	Costa attended the UNESCO General Conference.
Spain	Madrid	2 December	Costa attended the 2019 United Nations Climate Change Conference.
United Kingdom	London	3–4 December	Costa attended the 2019 London NATO summit.
Belgium	Brussels	12–13 December	Costa attended the European Council meeting.
Greece	Samos	17 December	Costa visited the Portuguese Maritime Police personnel stationed on the Greek island of Samos.
India	New Delhi	19 December	Costa participate in the second meeting of the Committee for the 150th anniversary celebrations of Mahatma Gandhi.

== 2020 ==
Country	Location(s)	Dates	Details
Belgium	Brussels	20–21 February	Costa attended an special European Council meeting on the EU's long-term budget.
Spain	Badajoz	1 July	Costa attended the ceremony of the reopening of the Portugal–Spain border.
Netherlands	The Hague	13 July	Costa had an bilateral meeting with Prime Minister Mark Rutte.
Belgium	Brussels	17–21 July	Costa attended an extraordinary European Council meeting on the recovery fund.
France	Porticcio	10 September	Costa attended the 7th EU MED9 Summit.
Belgium	Brussels	1–2 October	Costa attended an extraordinary European Council.
Belgium	Brussels	15–16 October	Costa attended the European Council meeting.
Belgium	Brussels	1 December	Costa met with European Council President Charles Michel.
Belgium	Brussels	10–11 December	Costa attended the European Council meeting.
France	Paris	16 December	Costa had a working meeting with President Emmanuel Macron.

== 2021 ==
Country	Location(s)	Dates	Details
Belgium	Brussels	10 March	Costa attended the Conference on the Future of Europe.
Andorra	Andorra la Vella	20–21 April	Costa attended the XXVII Ibero-American Summit.
France	Paris	18–19 May	Costa participate in the Summit on Financing African Economies.
Belgium	Brussels	24-25 May	Costa attended the Special Meeting of the European Council.
Belgium	Brussels	14 June	Costa attended the 2021 Brussels NATO summit.
Germany	Munich	19 June	Costa watched the game Portugal vs Germany of UEFA Euro 2020.
Belgium	Brussels	24–25 June	Costa attended the European Council meeting.
Slovenia	Ljubljana, Brdo pri Kranju	5–6 October	Costa attended an informal European Council and the EU-Western Balkans summit.
Belgium	Brussels	21–22 October	Costa attended the European Council.
Spain	Trujillo	28 October	Costa attended the 32nd Portuguese-Spanish Summit.
Germany	Berlin	10 November	Costa met with Angela Merkel and Olaf Scholz at the Meseberg Palace.
São Tomé and Príncipe	São Tomé	19 December	Costa visited the Portuguese military personnel and had a bilateral meeting.

== 2022 ==
Country	Location(s)	Dates	Details
France	Paris	11-12 February	Costa attended the opening of the France–Portugal Cultural Season.
Belgium	Brussels	17-18 February	Costa attended the 6th European Union–African Union Summit.
Belgium	Brussels	24 February	Costa attended a special meeting of the European Council to discuss the Russian invasion of Ukraine.
Guinea-Bissau	Bissau	5 March	Costa made an official visit and bilateral cooperation summit.
Cabo Verde	Praia	6–7 March	Costa attended the VI Portugal–Cabo Verde Summit.
France	Versailles	10–11 March	Participation in the informal meeting of EU Heads of State and Government.
Belgium	Brussels	24-25 March	Costa travelled to Brussels to attend the extraordinary 2022 Brussels extraordinary NATO summit to discuss the Russian invasion of Ukraine.
Romania	Bucharest, Caracal	18–19 May	Costa visited to Portuguese NATO forces and bilateral meetings.
Poland	Warsaw	19–20 May	Costa met with polish leadership and visit to a Ukrainian refugee reception centre.
Ukraine	Kyiv	21 May	Travelled to Kyiv to meet with Ukrainian President Volodymyr Zelenskyy.
Germany	Hanover	29–30 May	Costa attended the Hannover Messe 2022, alongside Chancellor Olaf Scholz.
France	Paris	7 June	Costa attended the Portugal–France cultural season and had a working lunch with Emmanuel Macron.
United Kingdom	London	13 June	Costa met with Prime Minister Boris Johnson in 10 Downing Street and they signed a UK–Portugal Joint Declaration on Bilateral Cooperation.
Netherlands	The Hague	14 June	Met with Prime Minister of Latvia Krišjānis Kariņš, NATO secretary general Jens Stoltenberg, Prime Minister Mark Rutte, Prime Minister of Denmark Mette Frederiksen, Prime Minister of Belgium Alexander De Croo and Prime Minister of Poland Mateusz Morawiecki on the Catshuis after a meeting in preparation for the NATO summit in Madrid. The discussions include the Russian invasion of Ukraine
Belgium	Brussels	23–24 June	Costa attended the European Council meeting.
Spain	Madrid	28–30 June	Costa attended the 2022 Madrid summit.
Mozambique	Maputo	1–2 September	Costa attended the V Portugal–Mozambique Summit.
Czech Republic	Prague	6 October	Costa travelled to Prague to attend the 1st European Political Community Summit.
Germany	Berlin	14 October	Costa met with Olaf Scholz and Pedro Sánchez to prepare for the European Council and discuss energy connections and the war in Ukraine.
Belgium	Brussels	20-21 October	Costa attended the European Council meeting.
Egypt	Sharm el-Sheikh	6–8 November	Costa attended the 2022 United Nations Climate Change Conference.
Qatar	Lusail	6 December	Costa watched the game Portugal vs Switzerland of 2022 FIFA World Cup.
Albania	Tirana	6 December	Attended the EU-Western Balkans summit.
Spain	Alicante	9 December	Costa attended the 9th EU MED9 Summit.
Belgium	Brussels	14–15 December	Costa attended the European Council meeting.

== 2023 ==
Country	Location(s)	Dates	Details
Belgium	Brussels	19–20 January	Costa made an official visit to the European Commission.
Belgium	Brussels	9 February	Costa attended an extraordinary European Council, including discussions on Ukraine.
Ethiopia	Addis Ababa	18-19 February	Costa attended, as an observer, the 36th African Union Summit.
Spain	Lanzarote	14-15 March	Costa attended the 34th Portugal–Spain Summit, with Pedro Sánchez.
Belgium	Brussels	23-24 March	Costa attended the European Council meeting, covering economic competitiveness, growth and employment.
Dominican Republic	Santo Domingo	24–25 March	Costa attended the XXVIII Ibero-American Summit.
South Korea	Seoul	11-12 April	Costa made an official visit focused on political, scientific and economic cooperation, particularly semiconductors, electronics, automotive industries and renewable energy.
Iceland	Reykjavík	15–17 May	Costa made the first official visit to Iceland, meeting Katrín Jakobsdóttir to discuss bilateral ties and energy issues.
Hungary	Budapest	31 May	Costa made a stopover during the journey to Moldova; Costa attended the UEFA Europa League final.
Moldova	Bulboaca	1 June	Costa attended the 2nd European Political Community Summit.
Angola	Luanda	5–6 June	Costa made an official bilateral visit, including meetings with President João Lourenço.
South Africa	Pretoria	7 June	Costa participate in the celebrations with the Portuguese community, alongside President Marcelo Rebelo de Sousa.
France	Paris	28 June	Costa attended the 6th Portugal–France High-Level Meeting, chaired with Élisabeth Borne.
Belgium	Brussels	29–30 June	Costa attended the European Council meeting.
Lithuania	Vilnius, Šiauliai	10–12 July	Costa attended the 2023 Vilnius summit. The day before, he visited the portuguese Air Force personnel at Šiauliai Air Base.
Belgium	Brussels	17–18 July	Costa attended the 3rd EU–CELAC summit.
New Zealand	Dunedin	23 July	Costa attended the Portugal's opening match in the FIFA Women's World Cup.
Timor-Leste	Dili	25–26 July	Costa made an official bilateral visit, meeting President José Ramos-Horta and Prime Minister Xanana Gusmão.
Chile	Santiago	10–11 September	Costa participate in the international commemorations marking 50 years since the 1973 coup d'état.
Malta	Mdina	29 September	Costa attended the 10th EU MED9 Summit.
Spain	Granada	5 October	Costa attended the 3rd European Political Community Summit.
Belgium	Brussels	23 October	Costa attended the Global Gateway Forum, including the closing ceremony.
Belgium	Brussels	26–27 October	Costa attended the European Council meeting.
United Arab Emirates	Dubai	1–2 December	Costa attended the 2023 United Nations Climate Change Conference.
Albania	Tirana	3 December	Costa met with Prime Minister Edi Rama.
North Macedonia	Skopje	4 December	Costa met with Prime Minister Dimitar Kovačevski.
Montenegro	Podgorica	4 December	Costa met with Prime Minister Milojko Spajić.
Belgium	Brussels	14-15 December	Costa attended the European Council meeting.

== 2024 ==
Country	Location(s)	Dates	Details
Belgium	Brussels	31 January–1 February	Costa participate in the Jacques Delors memorial ceremony on 31 January and attended the extraordinary European Council on 1 February.
United States	New York City	18 March	Costa made an official visit to the United Nations.
Belgium	Brussels	21-22 March	Costa attended the European Council meeting and bilateral meetings with European leaders.
France	Paris	22–23 March	Costa attended cultural events commemorating the 50th anniversary of the Portuguese Revolution.

== Multilateral meetings ==
António Costa participated in the following summits during his premiership:

Group	Year							
Group	2016	2017	2018	2019	2020	2021	2022	2023
NATO	8–9 July, (Poland) Warsaw	25 May, (Belgium) Brussels	11–12 July, (Belgium) Brussels	3–4 December, (United Kingdom) Watford	None	14 June, (Belgium) Brussels	24 March, (Belgium) Brussels	11–12 July, (Lithuania) Vilnius
NATO	8–9 July, (Poland) Warsaw	25 May, (Belgium) Brussels	11–12 July, (Belgium) Brussels	3–4 December, (United Kingdom) Watford	None	14 June, (Belgium) Brussels	28–30 June, (Spain) Madrid	11–12 July, (Lithuania) Vilnius
MED7/9	9 September, (Greece) Athens	28 January, (Portugal) Lisbon	10 January, (Italy) Rome	29 January, (Cyprus) Nicosia	10 September, (France) Porticcio	17 September, (Greece) Athens	9 December, (Spain) Alicante	29 September, (Malta) Mdina
MED7/9	9 September, (Greece) Athens	28 January, (Portugal) Lisbon	10 January, (Italy) Rome	14 June, (Malta) Valletta	10 September, (France) Porticcio	17 September, (Greece) Athens	9 December, (Spain) Alicante	29 September, (Malta) Mdina
EU–CELAC	None	26–27 October, (El Salvador) San Salvador	None					17–18 July, (Belgium) Brussels
EPC	Didn't exist						6 October, (Czech Republic) Prague	1 June, (Moldova) Bulboaca
EPC	Didn't exist						6 October, (Czech Republic) Prague	5 October, (Spain) Granada

== See also ==
- Foreign relations of Portugal
