= List of international presidential trips made by Klaus Iohannis =

This is a list of international presidential trips made by Klaus Werner Iohannis during his time as President of Romania (21 December 2014 to 12 February 2025).

== List ==
Date	Country	City	Notes				
2015
11 January	France	Paris	Republican marches in memory of the victims of the terrorist attacks in Paris				
15–16 January	Belgium	Brussels	Official visit to Brussels Meeting with the Secretary General of NATO, Jens Stoltenberg				
10 February	France	Paris	Official visit to France Talks with President François Hollande on French–Romanian relations, combating terrorism and Ukraine				
12 February	Belgium	Brussels	European Council EPP Summit				
25 February	Moldova	Chișinău	Official visit to the Republic of Moldova Meeting with President Nicolae Timofti. Talks with pro-European parties on bilateral relations and the process of European integration of Moldova				
26 February	Germany	Berlin	Official visit to Germany Talks with German Chancellor Angela Merkel on the situation in Ukraine, investments, European projects and strengthening the rule of law Meeting with the German President				
12–13 March	Poland	Warsaw	Official visit to Poland Talks with President Bronisław Komorowski on Ukraine, NATO and Moldova Meeting with the Prime Minister Ewa Kopacz				
17 March	Ukraine	Kyiv	Official visit to Ukraine				
19–20 March	Belgium	Brussels	European Council EPP Summit				
23 April	Belgium	Brussels	Special meeting of the European Council				
27–28 April	Italy	Rome	Official visit to Italy				
7 May	Poland	Gdańsk	Events to commemorate 70 years since the end of the Second World War				
14–15 May	Italy	Milan, Rome	Meeting with Romanian community in Milan and Pope Francis Official visit to the Holy See Visit to the Romanian Pavilion at the World Expo in Milano				
21–22 May	Latvia	Riga	Eastern Partnership Summit				
11 June	Belgium	Brussels	UE-CELAC Summit				
15–16 June	Croatia	Zagreb	Official visit to Croatia Meeting with President Kolinda Grabar-Kitarović, Prime Minister Zoran Milanović and President of the Sabor Josip Leko				
25–26 June	Belgium	Brussels	European Council				
12–13 July	Spain	Madrid	Official visit to Spain Meeting with King Felipe VI, Prime Minister Mariano Rajoy and Romanian community representatives				
16 July	Serbia	Belgrade	Official visit to Serbia				
26 July	Austria	Salzburg	Work meeting with the President of Austria, Heinz Fischer				
24–30 September	United States	New York City, Washington, D.C.	Represented Romania at the United Nations General Assembly Met with the United States President Barack Obama and Vice-president Joe Biden				
23–24 September	Belgium	Brussels	Special informal meeting of the European Council				
15–16 October	Belgium	Brussels	European Council				
25 October	Belgium	Brussels	Meeting organised by the European Commission on migration in the Western Balkans				
11–12 November	Belgium	Brussels	Informal meeting of the European Council EU-Africa Summit				
18–19 November	Slovakia	Bratislava	Official visit to Slovakia				
29 November	Belgium	Brussels	European Union – Türkiye Summit				
30 November	France	Paris	United Nations Conference on Climate Change – COP21				
2016
11–13 February	Germany	Munich	Munich Security Conference Meetings with the authorities of the Land of Bavaria				
18–20 February	Belgium	Brussels	European Council EPP Summit				
7–9 March	Israel	Jerusalem	State visit to the State of Israel				
10 March	Palestine	Ramallah	State visit to the State of Palestine				
17–18 March	Belgium	Brussels	European Council Working meeting between the EU leaders and the Prime Minister of Türkiye				
23–24 March	Turkey	Ankara	State visit to Türkiye				
31 March–1 April	United States	Washington, D.C.	Nuclear Security Summit Meeting with the Romanian Community Visit to the Holocaust Museum Working Dinner at the White House hosted by US President Barack Obama				
1 May	Afghanistan	Military base	Visiting the Romanian Troops deployed to Afghanistan				
18 May	Lithuania	Vilnius	State visit to Lithuania				
6–7 June	Luxembourg	Luxembourg City	Official visit to Luxembourg				
15–16 June	Bulgaria	Sofia, Pordim, Giurgiu-Ruse, Grivița, Pleven	Official visit to Bulgaria				
28 June	Belgium	Brussels	European Council				
8–9 July	Poland	Warsaw	NATO Summit				
10 July	Poland	Warsaw	Official visit to Poland				
9 September	Germany	Berlin	Work meeting with Federal Chancellor Angela Merkel, the Prime-Minister of Belgium, Charles Michel, and the Prime-Minister of Luxembourg, Xavier Bettel				
16 September	Slovakia	Bratislava	Informal meeting of the European Council				
28 September	Germany	Kiel	Receiving the Hermann Ehlers award, Hermann Ehlers Foundation				
30 September	Israel	Jerusalem	International funeral of the former President of Israel, Shimon Peres				
20–21 October	Belgium	Brussels	European Council				
15 December	Belgium	Brussels	European Council				
2017
24–25 January	France	Strasbourg	Official visit to the Council of Europe, as well as the European Court of Human Rights				
3 February	Malta	Valletta	Informal meeting of the European Council				
9–10 March	Belgium	Brussels	European Council				
24–25 March	Italy	Rome	Informal meeting of the European Council Celebration of 60 years since the Rome Treaties				
30 March	Malta	Valletta	EPP Summit				
29 April	Belgium	Brussels	European Council				
25 May	Belgium	Brussels	NATO Leaders Reunion				
5–9 June	United States	Washington, D.C.	Visit to the United States Meeting at the White House with the President of the United States Joint press conference with United States President Donald Trump Meeting with the Romanian community Meetings with the American authorities				
19–20 June	Germany	Berlin	Visit to Germany Meetings with the President of Germany and the Federal Chancellor Receiving the Semper Opera Ball Dresden Medal of St. George				
22–23 June	Belgium	Brussels	European Council				
6 July	Poland	Warsaw	The Three Seas Initiative Summit				
19–22 September	United States	New York CityPhiladelphia	Represented Romania at the 72nd General Assembly of the United Nations Meeting with the Romanian Community				
28–29 September	Estonia	Tallinn	Informal meeting of the European Council – Digital Summit				
19–20 October	Belgium	Brussels	European Council EPP Summit				
17 November	Sweden	Gothenburg	Social Summit				
24 November	Belgium	Brussels	European Council				
14–15 December	Belgium	Brussels	Eastern Partnership Summit				
2018
31 January	Belgium	Brussels	Visit to Brussels Meetings with the leaders of the European institutions				
23 February	Belgium	Brussels	European Council				
22–23 March	Belgium	Brussels	European Council EPP Summit				
4 May	Bulgaria	Ruse	Informal meeting of the Presidents of Romania, Bulgaria and Austria				
16 May	Bulgaria	Sofia	Informal meeting of the European Council				
17 May	Bulgaria	Sofia	European Union – Western Balkans Summit				
1–2 June	Germany	Munich	Visit to Bavaria Receiving the Franz Josef Strauss award, Hanns Seidel Foundation				
7 June	Poland	Warsaw	Bilateral visit to Poland				
8 June	Poland	Warsaw	Bucharest Nine Format Summit				
28–29 June	Belgium	Brussels	European Council				
11–12 July	Belgium	Brussels	NATO Summit				
19–20 September	Austria	Salzburg	Informal meeting of the European Council				
24–27 September	United States	New York City	Represented Romania at the 72nd General Assembly of the United Nations				
14–17 October	Italy	Rome, Naples	State visit in Italy				
18 October	Belgium	Brussels	European Council				
18–19 October	Belgium	Brussels	ASEM 12 Summit				
23 October	France	Strasbourg	Debate regarding the Future of Europe in the European Parliament				
10–11 November	France	Paris	Centenary of the end of World War I and first Paris Peace Forum				
14 November	United Kingdom	London	Event dedicated to his Royal Highness Charles, Prince of Wales, on the occasion of his 70th birthday				
25 November	Belgium	Brussels	Special meeting of the European Council				
26–27 November	France	Paris	Official visit to France Official opening of the Romania-France Cultural Season				
13–14 December	Belgium	Brussels	European Council				
17–18 December	Austria	Vienna	Europa-Africa High-Level Forum				
2019
22 January	Germany	Aachen	The signing of the Treaty of Aachen on Franco-German Cooperation and Integration				
16 February	Germany	Munich	The 55th Munich Security Conference Bilateral meeting with the Vicepresident of the United States of America, Mike Pence				
23–25 February	Egypt	Sharm El-Sheikh	EU – League of Arab States Summit				
28 February	Slovakia	Košice	Bucharest Nine Format Summit				
21–22 March	Belgium	Brussels	European Council EPP Summit Anual Trans-Atlantic Conference (AmCham EU)				
10 April	Belgium	Brussels	Special meeting of the European Council				
3–4 May	Italy	Florence	The State of the Union Conference				
13 May	Belgium	Brussels	Meeting of the representatives of the Eastern Partnership				
28 May	Belgium	Brussels	European Council EPP Summit				
5–6 June	Slovenia	Brdo	The Three Seas Initiative Summit				
20–21 June	Belgium	Brussels	European Council EPP Summit				
30 June–2 July	Belgium	Brussels	Special meeting of the European Council EPP Summit				
20 August	United States	Washington, D.C.	Visit to the White House				
24–26 September	United States	New York City	Represented Romania at the 74th General Assembly of the United Nations				
1 October	Belgium	Brussels	Official opening of the Europalia International Art Festival				
17–18 October	Belgium	Brussels	European Council				
21–22 October	Japan	Tokyo	The enthronement festivities of Emperor Naruhito				
20 November	Croatia	Zagreb	EPP Summit				
3–4 December	United Kingdom	Watford	NATO Summit				
12–13 December	Belgium	Brussels	European Council				
2020
7 January	Germany	Bavaria	Working visit to the Land of Bavaria				
21–23 January	Israel	Jerusalem	The Fifth World Holocaust Forum				
20–21 February	Belgium	Brussels	Special meeting of the European Council				
17–20 July	Belgium	Brussels	European Council				
1–2 October	Belgium	Brussels	European Council				
14 October	Germany	Magdeburg	Receiving the Emperor Otto Prize, awarded by the City of Magdeburg				
15–16 October	Belgium	Brussels	European Council				
10 December	Belgium	Brussels	European Council				
29 December	Moldova	Chișinău	Official visit to the Republic of Moldova				
2021							
7–8 May	Portugal	Porto	Informal meeting of the European Council (Social Summit) Work meeting of the EU-India Format				
24–25 May	Belgium	Brussels	Special meeting of the European Council				
14 June	Belgium	Brussels	NATO Summit				
16–17 June	Estonia	Tallinn	State visit in Estonia				
24–25 June	Belgium	Brussels	European Council EPP Summit				
8–9 July	Bulgaria	Sofia	The Three Seas Initiative Summit				
27 August	Moldova	Chișinău	Took part in Independence Day Celebrations Meeting with the Presidents of the Republic of Moldova, Poland and Ukraine				
9 September	Switzerland	Bern	Official visit to Switzerland				
21–22 September	United States	New York City	Represented Romania at the 76th session of the United Nations General Assembly				
1–2 October	Germany	Aachen	Receiving the Charlemagne Prize, awarded by the City of Aachen				
5–6 October	Slovenia	Bled	Informal meeting of the European Council European Union – Western Balkans Summit				
13 October	Sweden	Malmö	Malmö International Forum on Holocaust Remembrance and Combating Antisemitism				
21–22 October	Belgium	Brussels	European Council				
27 October	Egypt	Cairo	State visit in Egypt Meeting with President Abdel Fattah el-Sisi				
1–2 November	United Kingdom	Glasgow	2021 United Nations Climate Change Conference – COP26				
15 December	Belgium	Brussels	Eastern Partnership Summit				
16 December	Belgium	Brussels	European Council				
2022
16 February	France	Versailles	Attended the informal meeting of European Council regarding security situation in Sahel at the invitation of President Emmanuel Macron				
17 February	Belgium	Brussels	Informal meeting of the European Council				
17–18 February	Belgium	Brussels	European Union – African Union Summit				
24 February	Belgium	Brussels	Iohannis attended a special meeting of the European Council to discuss the Russian invasion of Ukraine.				
10 March	France	Versailles	Informal meeting of European Council				
16 March	Moldova	Chișinău	Meeting with President Maia Sandu in the context of war in Ukraine				
24 March	Belgium	Brussels	Extraordinary NATO Summit				
24–25 March	Belgium	Brussels	European Council				
30–31 May	Belgium	Brussels	Special meeting of the European Council				
4 June	Germany	Hof	Receiving the European Charles IV Prize of the Sudeten German Homeland Association				
14 June	Netherlands	The Hague	Informal meeting of leaders before the NATO Summit in Madrid				
16 June	Ukraine	Kyiv	Visit with the President of France, the Chancellor of Germany, and the Prime Minister of Italy				
20 June	Latvia	Riga	The Three Seas Initiative Summit and Business Forum				
23 June	Belgium	Brussels	European Union – Western Balkans Summit				
23–24 June	Belgium	Brussels	European Council				
28–30 June	Spain	Madrid	NATO Summit				
18–19 September	United Kingdom	London	Attended the state funeral of Elizabeth II				
20–23 September	United States	New York City, San Francisco	Represented Romania at the 77th General Assembly of the United Nations Visit to San Francisco, meetings with the Romanian Community from the West Coast of the US				
6–7 October	Czech Republic	Prague	Informal Summit of the European Council				
20–21 October	Belgium	Brussels	European Council				
7–8 November	Egypt	Sharm El-Sheikh	2022 United Nations Climate Change Conference – COP27				
11–12 November	France	Paris	Paris Peace Forum				
23 November	Latvia	Riga	Official visit to Latvia				
24 November	Lithuania	Vilnius Kaunas	Official visit to Lithuania Meeting of the Presidents of Lithuania, Latvia, Poland and Romania				
2 December	Greece	Athens	Working visit to Greece				
3 December	Greece	Athens	EPP Leaders Summit				
6 December	Albania	Tirana	European Union – Western Balkans Summit				
14 December	Belgium	Brussels	EU-ASEAN Summit				
15 December	Belgium	Brussels	European Council				
2023
2–3 February	Azerbaijan	Baku	Official visit to Azerbaijan				
9 February	Belgium	Brussels	Extraordinary European Council				
22 February	Poland	Warsaw	Bucharest Nine Format Summit				
27 February	Luxembourg	Luxembourg City	European Investment Bank Group Forum				
6–8 March	Japan	Tokyo and Kyoto	Official visit to Japan				
9–10 March	Singapore	Singapore	State visit to Singapore				
15 March	Bulgaria	Sofia	Official visit to Bulgaria				
March	United Arab Emirates	Abu Dhabi and Dubai	Official visit to the United Arab Emirates				
23–24 March	Belgium	Brussels	European Council				
April	Argentina, Chile, Brazil	Buenos Aires Santiago de Chile Brasília, Rio de Janeiro	Official visit to Argentina, Chile and Brazil				
5–6 May	United Kingdom	London	Attended the coronation of Charles III and Camilla				
16–17 May	Iceland	Reykjavík	Council of Europe Summit				
1 June	Moldova	Chișinău	European Political Community Summit, in Bulboaca				
3–4 June	Germany	Düsseldorf and Frankfurt	Receiving the German Civic Award, conferred by the Bad Harzburg Civic Foundation Receiving the Franz Werfel Human Rights Award, granted by the Centre Against Expulsions in Bonn				
6 June	Slovakia	Bratislava	Bucharest Nine Format Summit				
27 June	Netherlands	The Hague	Informal meeting of leaders before the NATO Summit in Lithuania				
29–30 June	Belgium	Brussels	European Council				
11–12 July	Lithuania	Vilnius	2023 NATO Summit				
17–18 July	Belgium	Brussels	EU-CELAC Summit				
19–21 September	United States	New York	Represented Romania at the 78th General Assembly of the United Nations				
5 October	Spain	Granada	European Political Community Summit				
6 October	Spain	Granada	Informal summit of the European Council				
7–9 October	Portugal	Porto and Lisbon	State visit in the Republic of Portugal				
11 October	Hungary	Budapest	Official visit to Hungary				
26–27 October	Belgium	Brussels	European Council				
2024
11 June	Latvia	Riga					
9–11 July	United States	Washington, D.C.	2024 NATO summit				
18 July	United Kingdom	Woodstock	4th European Political Community Summit				
7 November	Hungary	Budapest	5th European Political Community Summit.				
2025				3 February	Belgium	Brussels	Iohannis attended an informal European Council summit.

== Multilateral meetings ==
Group	Year									
Group	2015	2016	2017	2018	2019	2020	2021	2022	2023	2024
NATO	None	8–9 July, (Poland) Warsaw	25 May, (Belgium) Brussels	11–12 July, (Belgium) Brussels	3–4 December, (United Kingdom) Watford	None	14 June, (Belgium) Brussels	24 March, (Belgium) Brussels	11–12 July, (Lithuania) Vilnius	9–11 July, (United States) Washington, D.C.
NATO	None	8–9 July, (Poland) Warsaw	25 May, (Belgium) Brussels	11–12 July, (Belgium) Brussels	3–4 December, (United Kingdom) Watford	None	14 June, (Belgium) Brussels	28–30 June, (Spain) Madrid	11–12 July, (Lithuania) Vilnius	9–11 July, (United States) Washington, D.C.
Bucharest Nine	4 November, (Romania) Bucharest	None	None	8 June, (Poland) Warsaw	25 February, (Slovakia) Košice	None	10 May, (Romania) Bucharest	25 February, (Poland) Warsaw	22 February, (Poland) Warsaw	11 June, (Latvia) Riga
Bucharest Nine	4 November, (Romania) Bucharest	None	None	8 June, (Poland) Warsaw	25 February, (Slovakia) Košice	None	10 May, (Romania) Bucharest	10 June, (Romania) Bucharest	6 June, (Slovakia) Bratislava	11 June, (Latvia) Riga
Three Seas Initiative	None	25–26 August, (Croatia) Dubrovnik	6–7 July, (Poland) Warsaw	17–18 September, (Romania) Bucharest	5–6 June, (Slovenia) Ljubljana	19 October, (videoconference) (Estonia) Tallinn	8–9 July, (Bulgaria) Sofia	20–21 June, (Latvia) Riga	6–7 September, (Romania) Bucharest	11 April, (Lithuania) Vilnius
EU–CELAC	10 June, (Belgium) Brussels	None	26–27 October, (El Salvador) San Salvador	None					17–18 July, (Belgium) Brussels	None
EPC	Didn't exist							6 October, (Czech Republic) Prague	1 June, (Moldova) Bulboaca	18 July, (United Kingdom) Woodstock
EPC	Didn't exist							6 October, (Czech Republic) Prague	5 October, (Spain) Granada	7 November, (Hungary) Budapest
OIF	None	26–27 November, (Madagascar) Antananarivo	None	11–12 October, (Armenia) Yerevan	None			19–20 November, (Tunisia) Djerba	None	4–5 October, (France) Villers-Cotterêts
Others	None	Nuclear Security Summit; 31 March – 1 April, (United States) Washington, D.C.	None	None	None	None	None	None	5–6 May, (United Kingdom) London	Global Peace Summit; 15–16 June, (Switzerland) Lucerne
