= 2017 Brussels NATO summit =

2017 NATO summit meeting in Brussels, Belgium

NATO Summit Brussels 2017 2017 Brussels Summit

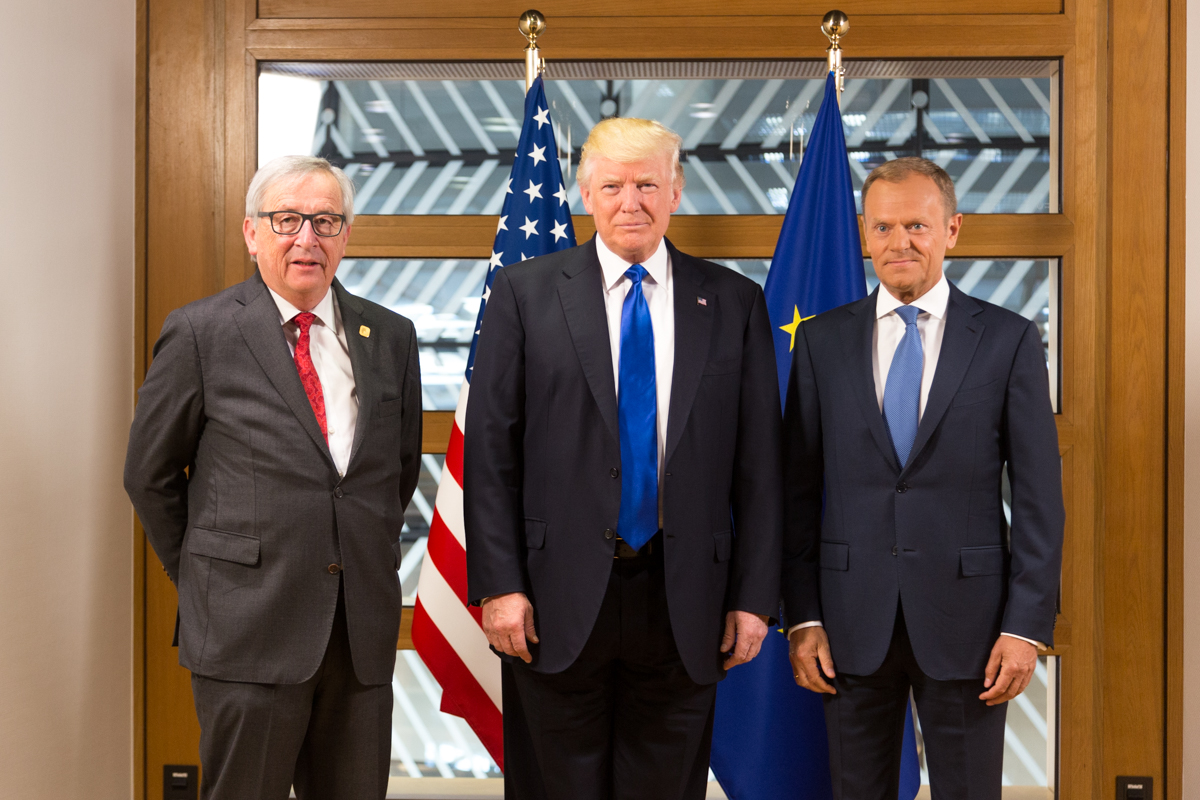
- Jean-Claude Juncker, Donald Trump and Donald Tusk at the 2017 Brussels Summit
- Host country: Belgium
- Date: 25 May 2017
- Cities: Brussels
- Venues: NATO Headquarters in Brussels, Belgium
- Follows: 2016 Warsaw summit
- Precedes: 2018 Brussels summit

The 2017 Brussels Summit of the North Atlantic Treaty Organization (NATO) was a NATO summit of the heads of state and heads of government of the North Atlantic Treaty Organization, held in Brussels, Belgium, on 25 May 2017.

== Agenda ==
There had been multiple competing agendas leading up to the summit, with Southern European members concerned with security in North Africa and the Middle East and the European migrant crisis and Eastern European members concerned more about Russia's policies. There was also concern about the Russia–Turkey relationship. Donald Trump, the President of the United States, urged the NATO members to meet the 2014 agreement to seek to spend at least two percent of their gross domestic product on defense. According to at least one senior White House official, Donald Trump had expressed interest in inviting Russia to the G7 summit and was considering leaving the NATO alliance. During the opening ceremony of the new NATO headquarters building, President Trump gave a speech which did not mention Article 5 of the North Atlantic Treaty, surprising H. R. McMaster, the National Security Advisor, James Mattis, the United States Secretary of Defense, and Rex Tillerson, the United States Secretary of State, who had approved a different speech that explicitly included the collective security commitment.

== Accomplishments ==
NATO was set to become a full member of the Global Coalition, alongside NATO pledging to increase its support to the Coalition. A terrorism intelligence cell was agreed to be set up within the new intelligence division, which is intended to improve the sharing of information between members.

The Alliance leaders agreed to submit national action plans by December, which were to set out how members intend to meet the pledge to spend at least two percent of their GDP on defense by 2024.

Montenegro, represented by the prime minister Duško Marković, joined the meeting, days before it was to officially become a member of the organization on 5 June 2017. The possibility of NATO membership was said to remain open to other states.

== Aftermath ==
A few days after, also following a G7 meeting, German Chancellor Angela Merkel told a crowd in a Bavarian beer hall that "we Europeans must really take our fate into our own hands – of course in friendship with the United States of America, in friendship with Great Britain and as good neighbors wherever that is possible also with other countries, even with Russia. But we have to know that we must fight for our future on our own, for our destiny as Europeans."

== Future summits ==
The next major summit (28th) was to take place in Istanbul, Turkey in 2018. However, France, Germany, the Netherlands and Denmark have reportedly led a drive to block it.

On 20 October 2017 the NATO Secretary General announces that the 28th summit would be on 11 and 12 July 2018 in Brussels.

== Leaders and other dignitaries in attendance ==
=== Member states ===
- Albania – Prime Minister Edi Rama
- Belgium – King Philippe and Prime Minister Charles Michel
- Bulgaria – President Rumen Radev
- Canada – Prime Minister Justin Trudeau
- Croatia – President Kolinda Grabar-Kitarović
- Czech Republic – President Miloš Zeman
- Denmark – Prime Minister Lars Løkke Rasmussen
- Estonia – Prime Minister Jüri Ratas
- France – President Emmanuel Macron
- Germany – Chancellor Angela Merkel
- Greece – Prime Minister Alexis Tsipras
- Hungary – Prime Minister Viktor Orbán
- Iceland – Prime Minister Bjarni Benediktsson
- Italy – Prime Minister Paolo Gentiloni
- Latvia – President Raimonds Vējonis
- Lithuania – President Dalia Grybauskaitė
- Luxembourg – Prime Minister Xavier Bettel
- Netherlands – Prime Minister Mark Rutte
- Norway – Prime Minister Erna Solberg
- Poland – President Andrzej Duda
- Portugal – Prime Minister António Costa
- Romania – President Klaus Iohannis
- Slovakia – President Andrej Kiska
- Slovenia – Prime Minister Miro Cerar
- Spain – Prime Minister Mariano Rajoy
- Turkey – President Recep Tayyip Erdoğan
- United Kingdom – Prime Minister Theresa May
- United States – President Donald Trump
- NATO – Secretary General Jens Stoltenberg

=== Non-member states and organisations ===
- Montenegro – Prime Minister Duško Marković
