= 2018 Brussels NATO summit =

2018 NATO summit meeting in Brussels, Belgium

NATO Summit Brussels 2018 2018 Brussels Summit
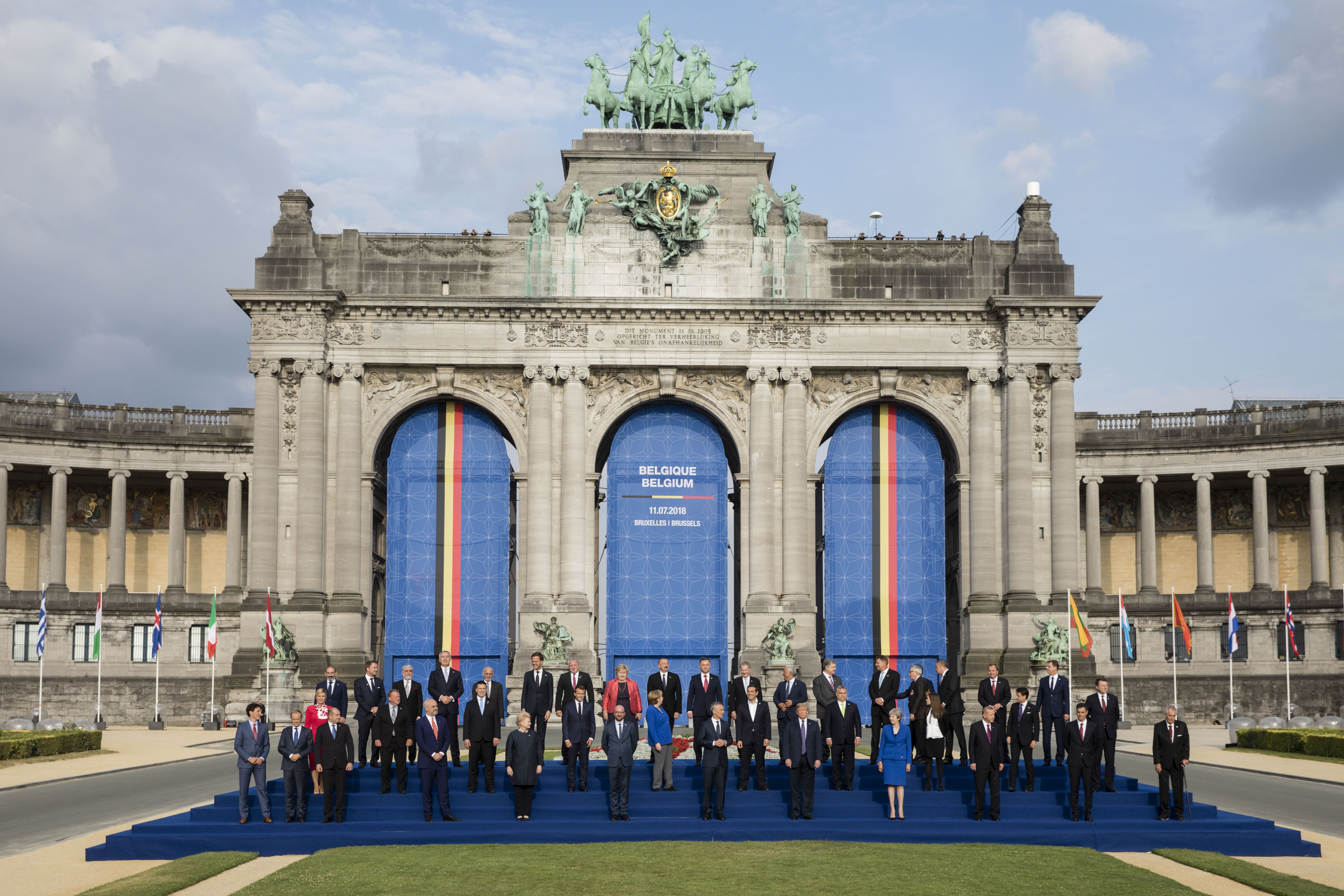
- Host country: Belgium
- Date: 11–12 July 2018
- Cities: Brussels
- Venues: NATO Headquarters in Brussels, Belgium
- Follows: 2017 Brussels summit
- Precedes: 2019 London summit

The 2018 Brussels Summit of the North Atlantic Treaty Organization (NATO) was the formal meeting of the heads of state and heads of government of the North Atlantic Treaty Organization, held in Brussels, Belgium, on 11 and 12 July 2018.

== Events ==
On 10 July 2018 the so-called 2018 Brussels Joint Declaration was signed, between Jean-Claude Juncker, Donald Tusk and Jens Stoltenberg.

On the opening day of the conference the President of the United States, Donald Trump, caused controversy by asserting that Germany is beholden to Russia over its involvement in the Nord Stream 1 gas pipeline project aimed at doubling energy imports from Russia. This was the first time he addressed the leaders since the inauguration ceremony of the new NATO Headquarters, at which he stressed a similar point. German Chancellor Angela Merkel reacted defensively to Trump's comments and tried to deflect them with: "I am very happy that today we are united in freedom, the Federal Republic of Germany. Because of that we can say that we can make our independent policies and make independent decisions."

== Leaders and other dignitaries in attendance ==
=== Member states ===
- Albania – Prime Minister Edi Rama
- Belgium – King Philippe and Prime Minister Charles Michel
- Bulgaria – President Rumen Radev
- Canada – Prime Minister Justin Trudeau
- Croatia – President Kolinda Grabar-Kitarović
- Czech Republic – President Miloš Zeman
- Denmark – Prime Minister Lars Løkke Rasmussen
- Estonia – Prime Minister Jüri Ratas
- France – President Emmanuel Macron
- Germany – Chancellor Angela Merkel
- Greece – Prime Minister Alexis Tsipras
- Hungary – Prime Minister Viktor Orbán
- Iceland – Prime Minister Katrín Jakobsdóttir
- Italy – Prime Minister Giuseppe Conte
- Latvia – President Raimonds Vējonis
- Lithuania – President Dalia Grybauskaitė
- Luxembourg – Prime Minister Xavier Bettel
- Montenegro – Prime Minister Duško Marković
- Netherlands – Prime Minister Mark Rutte
- Norway – Prime Minister Erna Solberg
- Poland – President Andrzej Duda
- Portugal – Prime Minister António Costa
- Romania – President Klaus Iohannis
- Slovakia – President Andrej Kiska
- Slovenia – Prime Minister Miro Cerar
- Spain – Prime Minister Pedro Sánchez
- Turkey – President Recep Tayyip Erdoğan
- United Kingdom – Prime Minister Theresa May
- United States – President Donald Trump
- NATO – Secretary General Jens Stoltenberg

=== Non-member states and organisations ===
- Afghanistan – President Ashraf Ghani
- Armenia – Prime Minister Nikol Pashinyan
- Azerbaijan – President Ilham Aliyev
- Finland – President Sauli Niinistö
- Georgia – President Giorgi Margvelashvili
- Republic of Macedonia – Prime Minister Zoran Zaev
- Sweden – Prime Minister Stefan Löfven
- Ukraine – President Petro Poroshenko

== Security ==
For the first time a RF Drone Detection System was used (a white dome seen at the right rooftop of the summit picture).

== Aftermath ==
The New York Times reported on 9 August 2018 that Trump's senior national security advisors, concerned that Trump might disrupt the summit as he did by refusing to sign the communiqué at the June G7 summit, scrambled to secure a formal policy agreement during the weeks before the summit.

== See also ==
- 2018 Russia–United States Summit
