= 2016 Warsaw NATO summit =

2016 NATO summit meeting in Warsaw, Poland

NATO Summit Warsaw 2016 2016 Warsaw Summit
- Logo of the Warsaw Summit
- Host country: Poland
- Date: 8–9 July 2016
- Cities: Warsaw
- Venues: National Stadium
- Precedes: 2017 Brussels summit
- Website: http://www.nato.int/cps/en/natohq/events_132023.htm/

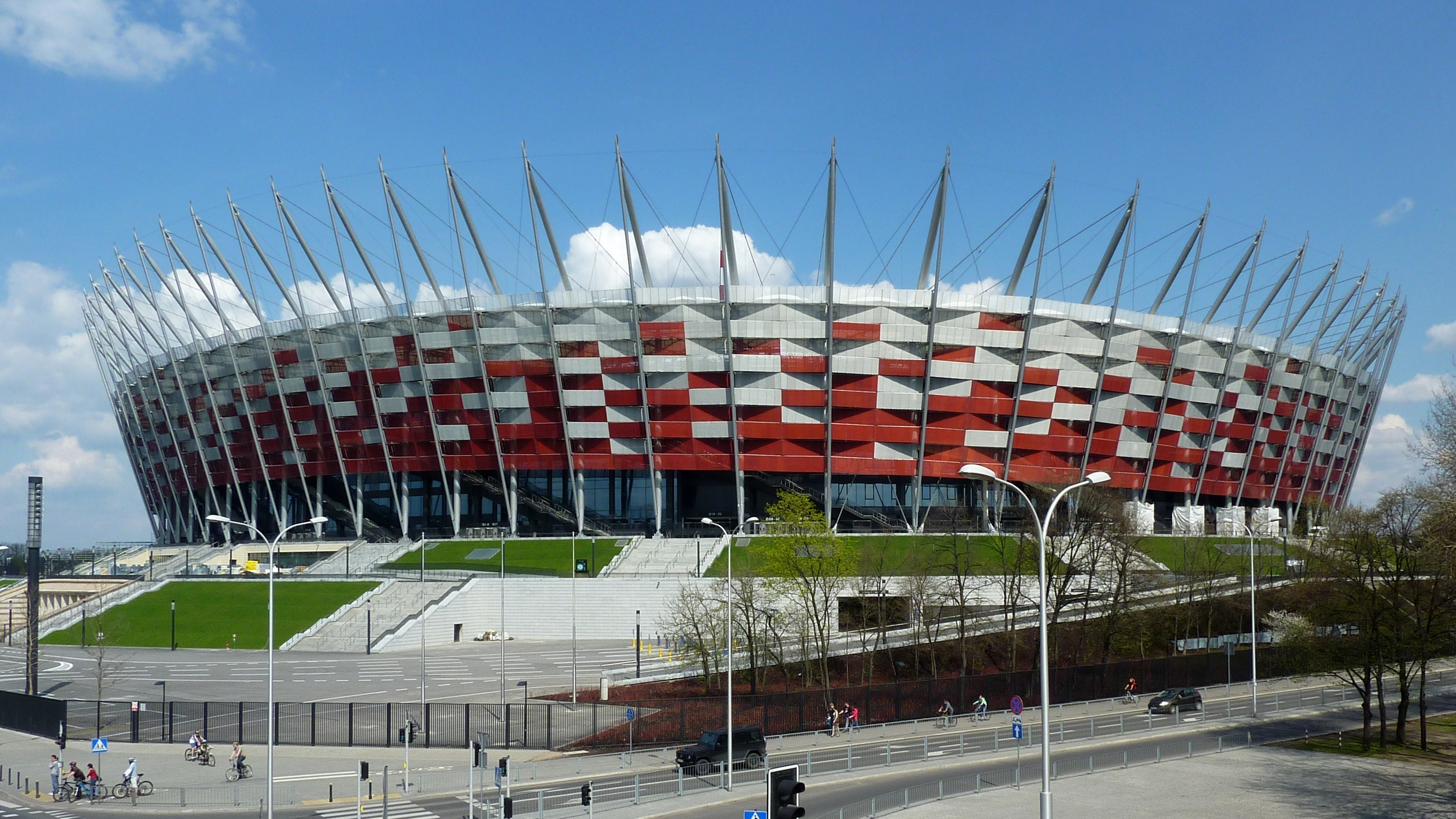
The 2016 NATO summit was held at the National Stadium in Warsaw

The 2016 Warsaw Summit of the North Atlantic Treaty Organization (NATO) was the formal summit of the heads of state and heads of government of the North Atlantic Treaty Organization, held at the National Stadium in Warsaw, Poland, on 8 and 9 July 2016.

== Agenda ==
=== Poland ===
Polish president Andrzej Duda announced in August 2015 that NATO bases in Central Europe were a priority for the Warsaw Summit, and wanted for Poland to be included in the Normandy Format talks. Members of NATO on its eastern flank, who in November 2015 convened into a group called the Bucharest Nine, felt threatened by a revanchist Russia, and he said he will raise the issue with Angela Merkel, who had "previously blocked efforts to place NATO troops in central and eastern Europe, saying it might strain relations with Russia."

== Outcomes ==
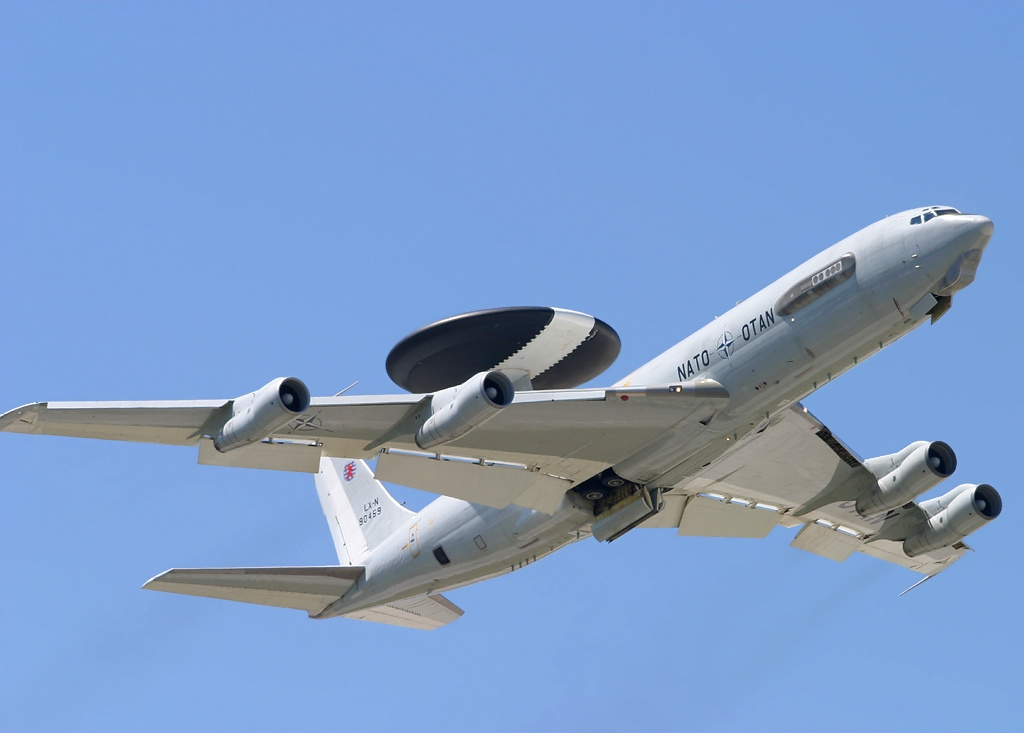
One of 16 NATO Boeing E-3 Sentry AWACS aircraft that will monitor ISIL activities from Turkish and international airspace

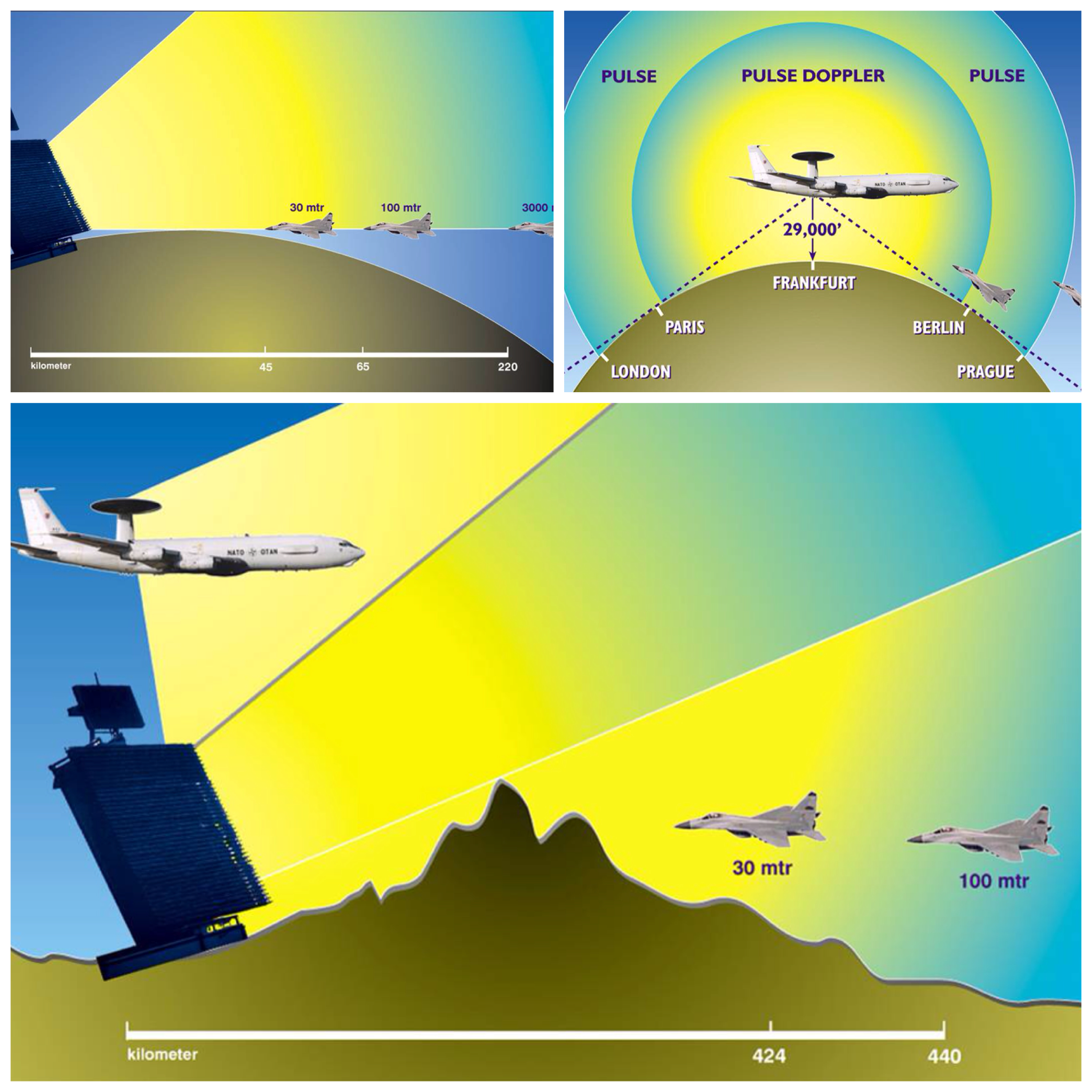
At an altitude of 30,000 feet a single E-3A has over 312,000 km^{2} in its field of view and can continuously survey airspace within a radius of more than 400 km

- Strengthening the alliance's military presence in the east, with four battalions in Poland, Estonia, Latvia, and Lithuania on a rotational basis – to be in place by 2017. This became known as NATO Enhanced Forward Presence.
- Allies declared Initial Operational Capability of NATO's Ballistic Missile Defence to counter threats posed by Iran and further afield, North Korea, to the European continent.
- Pledge to strengthen individual nations' and collective cyber defences, and recognise cyberspace as a new operational domain.
- Commitment to improve member state resilience.
- Start training and capacity building inside Iraq.
- NATO Boeing E-3 Sentry AWACS surveillance planes to provide information and intelligence to the Global Coalition to counter ISIL from Turkish and international airspace.
- Agreed to an expanded maritime presence in the Mediterranean Sea to cope with the European migrant crisis and human trafficking.
- Continue the Resolute Support Mission in Afghanistan beyond 2016, confirmed funding commitments for Afghan forces until 2020.
- NATO-Ukraine Commission reviewed the security situation in Ukraine, endorsed government plans for reform, agreed a Comprehensive Assistance Package for Ukraine.
- NATO Secretary General signed a Joint Declaration with the Presidents of the European Council and the European Commission to take partnership between NATO and the European Union to a higher level. Declaration sets out areas where NATO and the EU will step up cooperation – including maritime security and countering hybrid threats posed by a more aggressive Russia.

== Future summits ==
Normally NATO summits take place every two years, but after the Warsaw summit it was announced that the next alliance summit (27th) would take place in 2017 in Brussels to inaugurate the new €1 billion NATO headquarters building.

The next major summit (27th) took place in Brussels in 2017.

== Leaders and other dignitaries in attendance ==
Countries in attendance

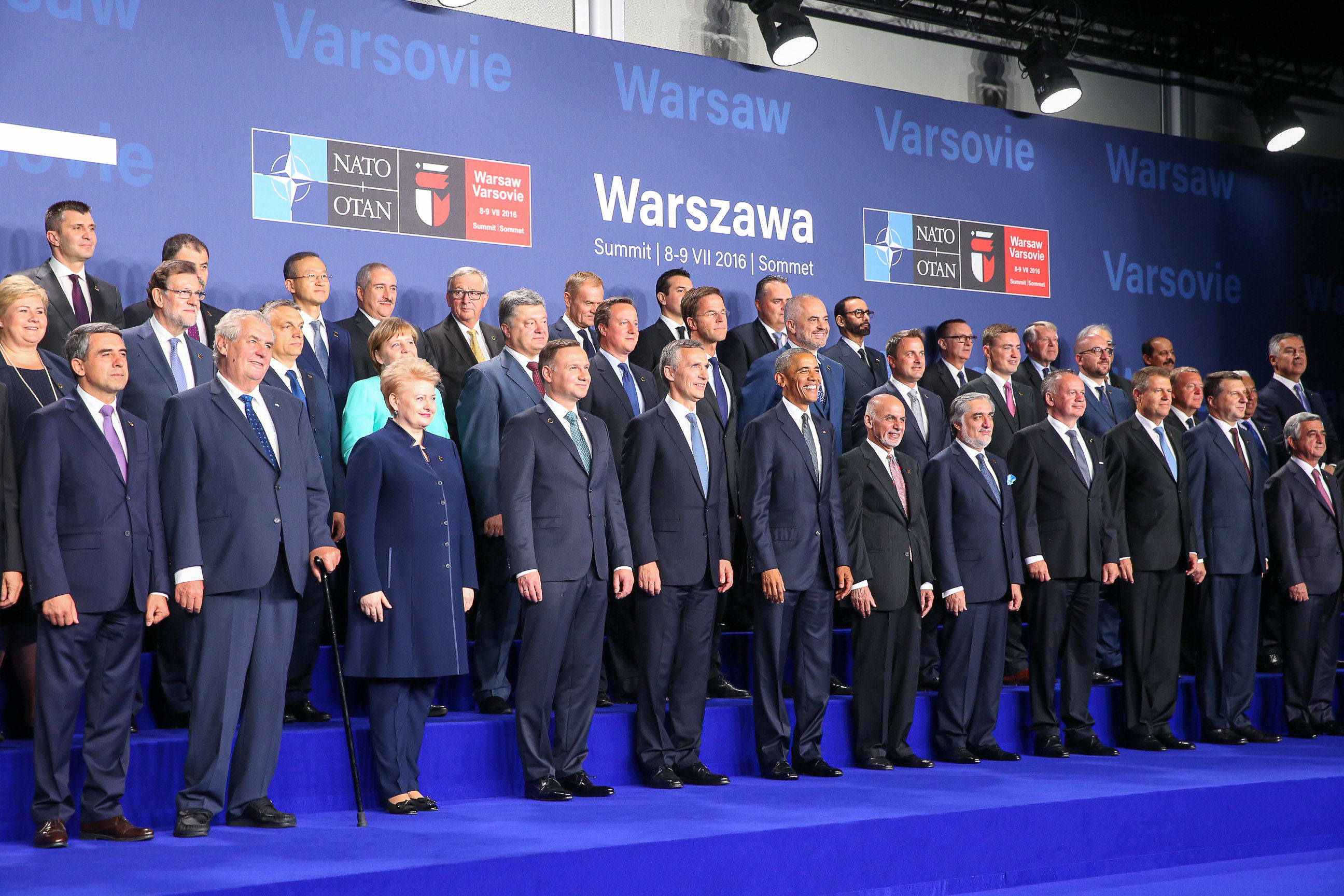
Country leaders, family photo

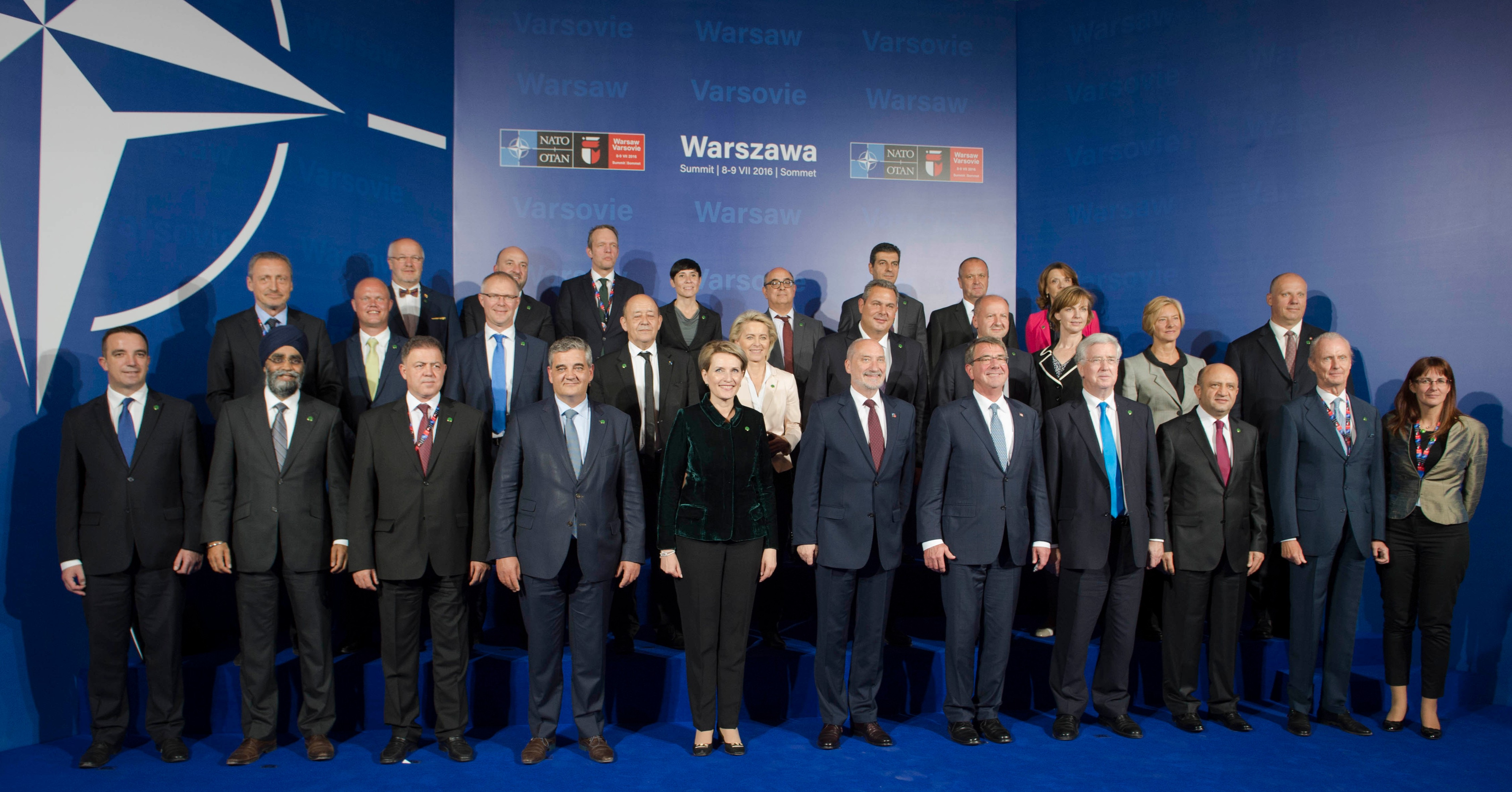
NATO Defence Ministers gather at the 2016 Warsaw summit in Poland

Key
Non-NATO member

Country or organization	Head of Delegation	Title	Ref.
NATO	Jens Stoltenberg	Secretary General	
Afghanistan (Note: Afghanistan, Armenia, Australia, Austria, Azerbaijan, Bosnia and Herzegovina, Finland, Georgia, Ireland, Jordan, Macedonia, Moldova, Montenegro, Sweden, Switzerland, Ukraine and United Arab Emirates were not member states of NATO but were invited to attend and participate in the summit. The presidents of the European Council and European Commission were also invited,)	Ashraf Ghani	President	
Albania	Edi Rama	Prime Minister	
Armenia	Serzh Sargsyan	President	
Australia	Mark Higgie	Ambassador	
Austria	Hans Peter Doskozil	Defence Minister	
Azerbaijan	Ilham Aliyev	President	
Belgium	Charles Michel	Prime Minister	
Bulgaria	Rosen Plevneliev	President	
Bosnia and Herzegovina	Bakir Izetbegović	Chairman of the Presidency	
Canada	Justin Trudeau	Prime Minister	
Croatia	Kolinda Grabar-Kitarović	President	
Czech Republic	Miloš Zeman	President	
Denmark	Lars Løkke Rasmussen	Prime Minister	
Estonia	Taavi Rõivas	Prime Minister	
European Union	Donald Tusk	Council President	
European Union	Jean-Claude Juncker	Commission President	
Finland	Sauli Niinistö	President	
France	François Hollande	President	
Georgia	Giorgi Margvelashvili	President	
Germany	Angela Merkel	Chancellor	
Greece	Alexis Tsipras	Prime Minister	
Hungary	Viktor Orbán	Prime Minister	
Iceland	Sigurður Ingi Jóhannsson	Prime Minister	
Ireland	Paul Kehoe	Defence Minister	
Italy	Matteo Renzi	Prime Minister	
Jordan	Nasser Judeh	Deputy Prime Minister and Foreign Minister	
Latvia	Raimonds Vējonis	President	
Lithuania	Dalia Grybauskaitė	President	
Luxembourg	Xavier Bettel	Prime Minister	
Macedonia	Zoran Jolevski	Defence Minister	
Moldova	Anatol Șalaru	Defence Minister	
Montenegro	Milo Đukanović	Prime Minister	
Netherlands	Mark Rutte	Prime Minister	
Norway	Erna Solberg	Prime Minister	
Poland	Andrzej Duda (host)	President	
Portugal	António Costa	Prime Minister	
Romania	Klaus Iohannis	President	
Slovakia	Andrej Kiska	President	
Slovenia	Miro Cerar	Prime Minister	
Spain	Mariano Rajoy	Prime Minister	
Sweden	Stefan Löfven	Prime Minister	
Switzerland	Guy Parmelin	Defence Minister	
Turkey	Recep Tayyip Erdoğan	President	
Ukraine	Petro Poroshenko	President	
United Arab Emirates	Mohammed Ahmad Al Bowardi	Defence Minister	
United Kingdom	David Cameron	Prime Minister	
United States	Barack Obama	President	

== See also ==
- Article 3 of the North Atlantic Treaty
