= 3rd EU–CELAC summit =

Hosted by Brussels, Belgium, in 2023

III EU–CELAC Summit 2023
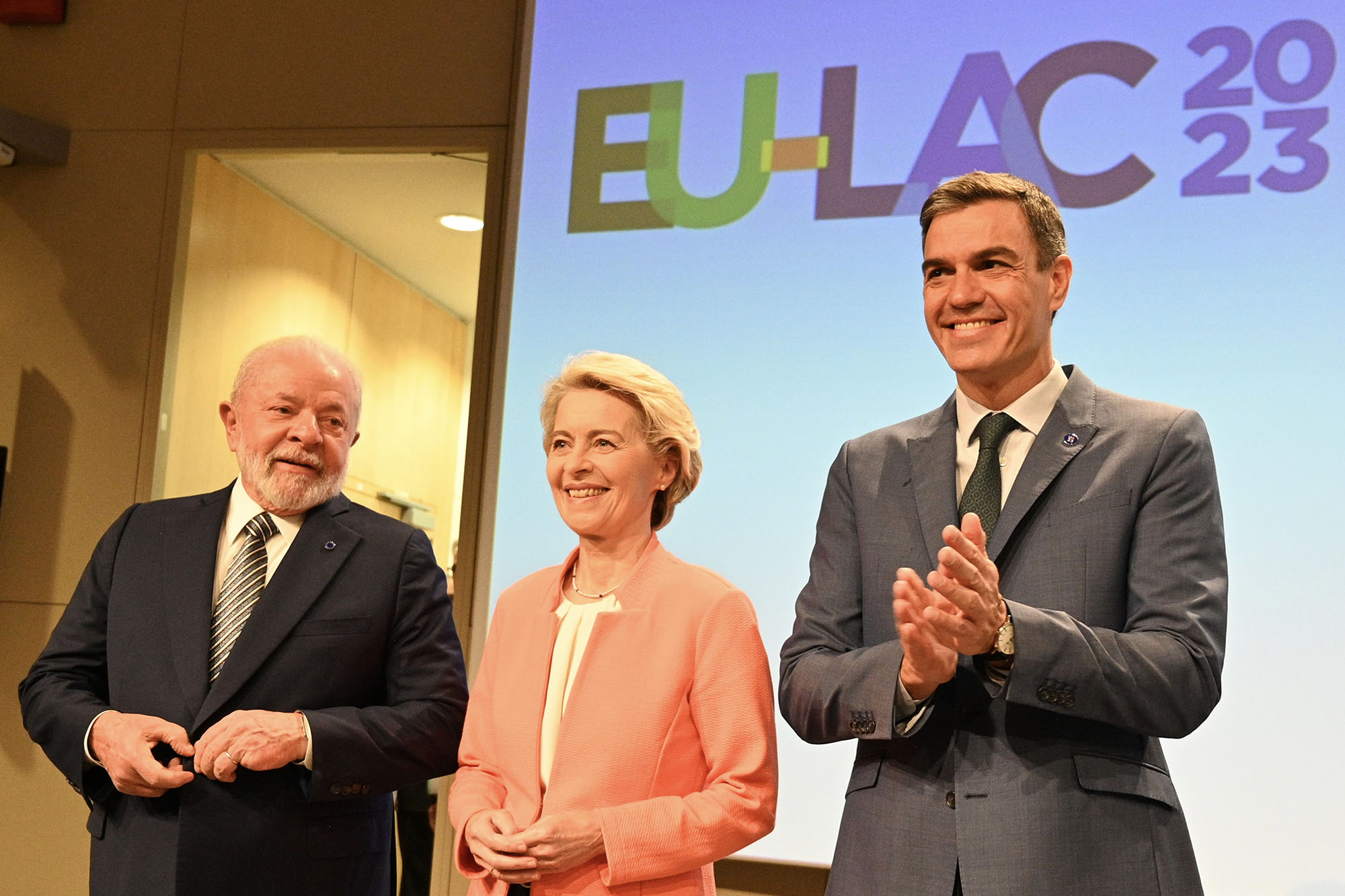
- Leaders (Note: Pictured are Brazilian president Luiz Inácio Lula da Silva (left), European Commission president Ursula von der Leyen (center), and Spanish prime minister Pedro Sánchez (right).) of the European Union and the Community of Latin American and Caribbean States on the first day of the summit
- Date: 17–18 July 2023
- Cities: Brussels, Belgium
- Follows: 2nd EU–CELAC summit
- Website: https://eulacfoundation.org/en/iii-eu-celac-summit-2023

The third summit between the European Union (EU) and the Community of Latin American and Caribbean States (CELAC) took place in Brussels, Belgium, over two days, from 17 July to 18 July 2023.

It took place while Spain held the presidency of the Council of the European Union and Ralph Gonsalves, the prime minister of Saint Vincent and the Grenadines, held the pro tempore presidency of CELAC. It was the first such summit in eight years; the previous summit was held in 2015.

== Overview ==
The summit was seen as a way to revitalize the relationship between the two parties and possibly make progress on finalizing a trade agreement between the EU and Mercosur, a South American trade bloc. (Note: The parties had already mostly agreed to the deal in 2019.) Shortly before the summit, European Commission president Ursula von der Leyen announced that the EU was planning to invest 45 billion euros into Latin America and the Caribbean, as part of the EU's Global Gateway strategy. (Note: Global Gateway is an infrastructure development strategy considered to be a competitor to China's Belt and Road Initiative.)

The participants had significant trouble coming to an agreement over what to include in a joint declaration of the summit: the EU parties wanted a strong condemnation of the Russian invasion of Ukraine, while some of the CELAC parties maintained strong relations with Russia and wished to avoid making such a statement. In addition, many of the CELAC countries wanted to address the issue of paying reparations for slavery, an idea which received pushback from the EU countries, with Irish taoiseach Leo Varadkar pointing out that not every European country had colonies or partook in the slave trade.

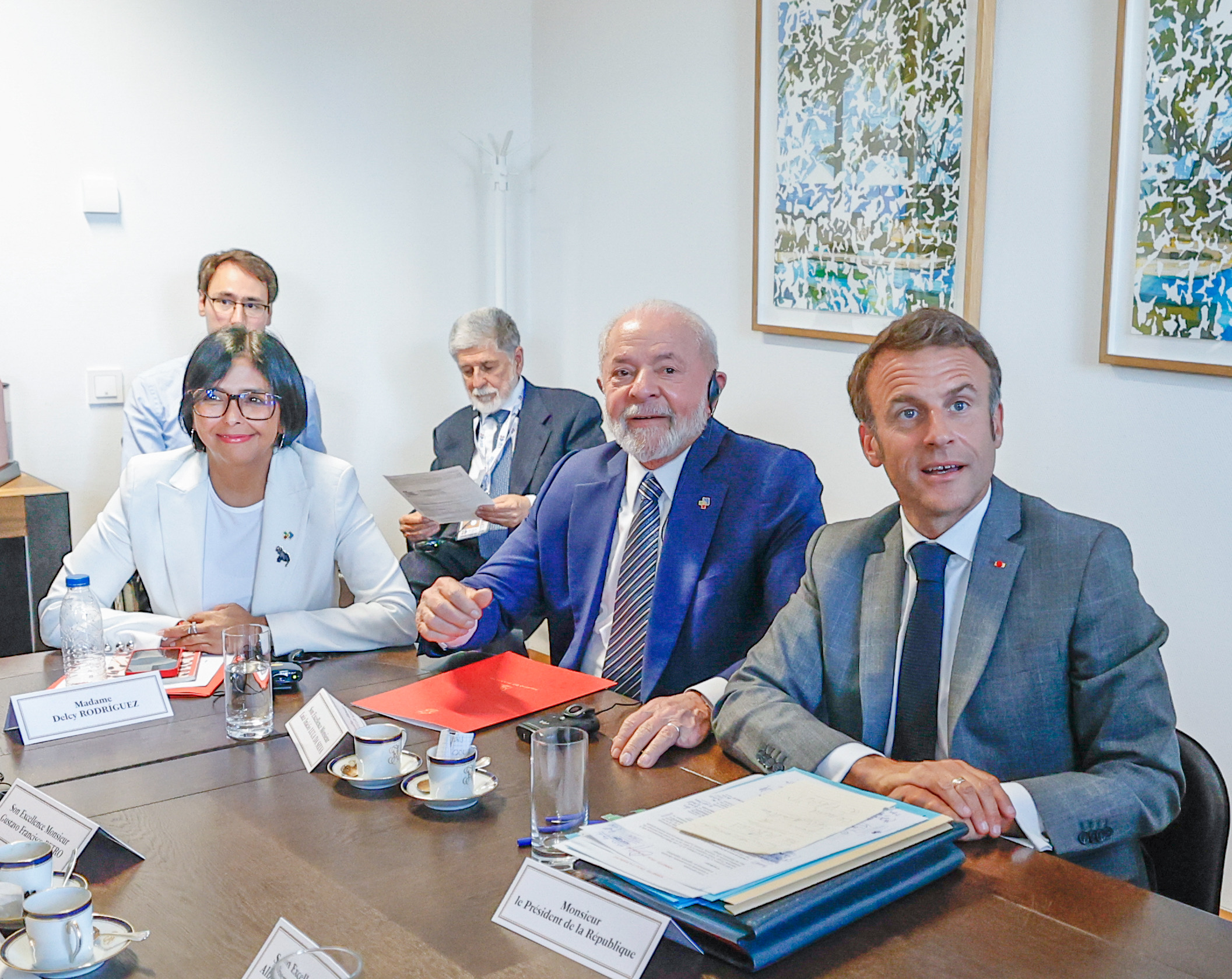
Venezuelan Vice President Delcy Rodríguez, Brazilian President Luiz Inácio Lula da Silva and French President Emmanuel Macron on the first day of the summit

In the end, the summit managed to produce what El País described as a "lukewarm condemnation of the war" that made no mention of Russia, despite attempts by Nicaragua to block such a condemnation. (Note: Nicaragua ended up not endorsing the declaration due to the language condemning the war.) In addition, although the final declaration did not commit to the payment of reparations, it stated that the parties "profoundly regret" the suffering that the slave trade had caused. Furthermore, the parties agreed to hold summits every two years, with the next meeting scheduled to be held in Colombia in 2025.

Not much progress was made on the trade agreement; it was only briefly mentioned in the final declaration. European diplomats were hoping for commitments addressing their concerns about the environment, after Brazilian former president Jair Bolsonaro had allowed the deforestation of the Amazon rainforest to reach a 15-year high. Their CELAC counterparts demurred, stating that environmentalism should not be used as a pretext for protectionism. Some of the EU countries have also voiced concerns about the possible flooding of beef from countries such as Argentina and Brazil.

== Reactions ==
Brazilian president Luiz Inácio Lula da Silva, who also held the pro tempore presidency of Mercosur during the summit, remarked that he had "rarely seen so much political and economic interest from the EU countries towards Latin America" and considered the summit "extremely successful". European Council president Charles Michel said that he had left the summit "feeling that we had done our duty".

British prime minister Rishi Sunak condemned the EU because the final declaration of the summit had used the term "Islas Malvinas" next to the term "Falkland Islands", which led a spokesperson for the EU to clarify that the union had not changed its position regarding the islands.

== Gallery ==
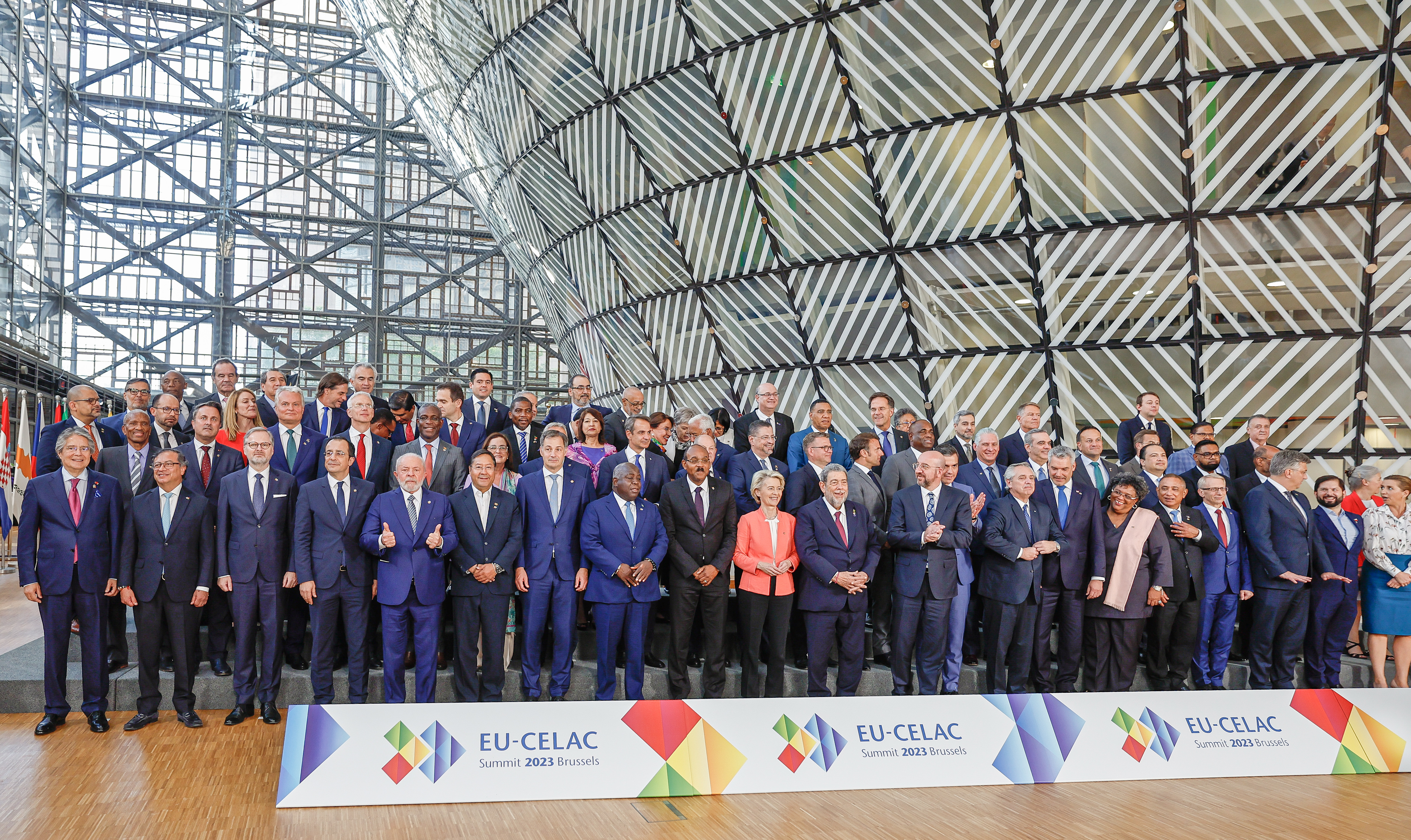
Participants in the Europa building on the first day of the summit
