= 2024 G20 Rio de Janeiro summit =

Summit of the leaders of all G20 member nations in Rio de Janeiro, Brazil

2024 G20 Rio de Janeiro summit 19th G20 Summit
- 16–19 November 2024

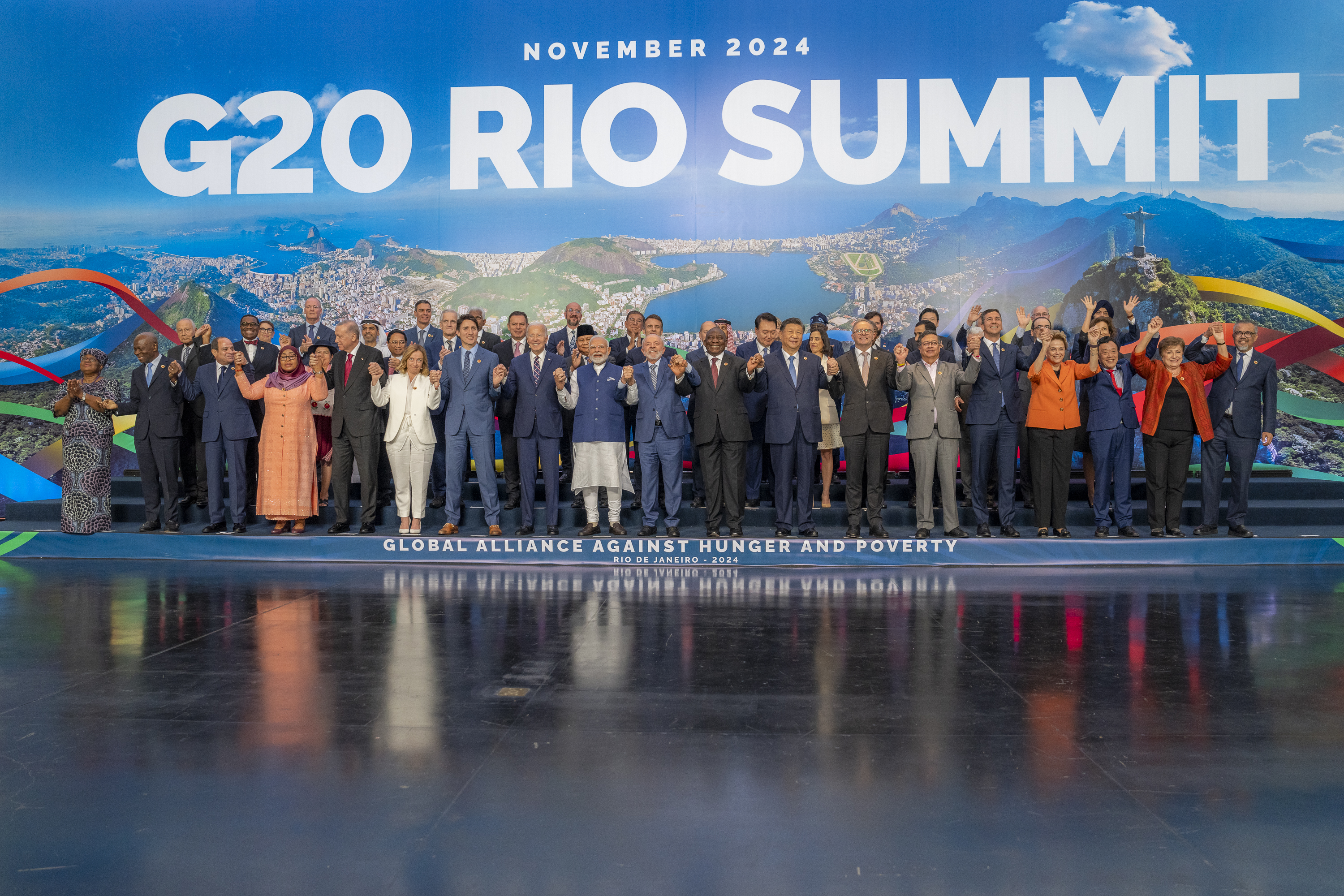
- 2024 G20 summit attendees
- Host country: Brazil
- Motto: Building a Just World and a Sustainable Planet (Portuguese: Construindo um Mundo Justo e um Planeta Sustentável)
- Cities: Rio de Janeiro
- Venues: Museum of Modern Art
- Participants: G20 members Invited states: Angola; Bolivia; Chile; Colombia; Egypt; Holy See; Malaysia; Nigeria; Norway; Paraguay; Portugal; Qatar; Singapore; Spain; United Arab Emirates; International bodies: AFDB, CAF, FSB, FAO, IDB, ILO, IMF, LAS, NDB, UN, AU; UNCTAD, UNESCO, World Bank, WHO, WTO.:
- Chair: Luiz Inácio Lula da Silva, President of Brazil

The 2024 G20 Rio de Janeiro summit (Portuguese: Cúpula do G20 Rio de Janeiro 2024) was the nineteenth meeting of Group of Twenty (G20), a Heads of State and Government meeting held at the Museum of Modern Art in Rio de Janeiro from 18 to 19 November 2024. It was the first G20 summit to be hosted in Brazil. Additionally, It marked the first full G20 summit with the African Union as a member, following its inclusion during the previous summit in 2023.

== Presidency ==
The Brazilian presidency officially started on 1 December 2023, with President Luiz Inácio Lula da Silva as chair, under its theme being Building a Just World and a Sustainable Planet.

== Agenda priorities ==
G20 Brazil set three main agenda priorities for the G20 dialogue in 2024:

- Social inclusion and the fight against hunger
- Energy transition and sustainable development in its social, economic and environmental aspects
- Reform of the global governance institutions

Addressing the G20 countries in India on 10 September 2023, Lula announced the creation of the Global Mobilization Against Climate Change working group, aimed at generating income and reduce inequalities for the people affected by climate change. Another focus of the Brazilian presidency was advocating for comprehensive reform of global institutions, such as the World Bank, International Monetary Fund and World Trade Organization, in addition to the reforming the United Nations Security Council to enhance the representation and influence of the Global South on the world stage.

=== G20 Social ===
The Brazilian presidency launched the G20 Social, space where for the first time, the organization will bring the civil society into the debate where it can participate and contribute to discussions and policy formulations regarding to the summit.

== Treaty against hunger and poverty ==
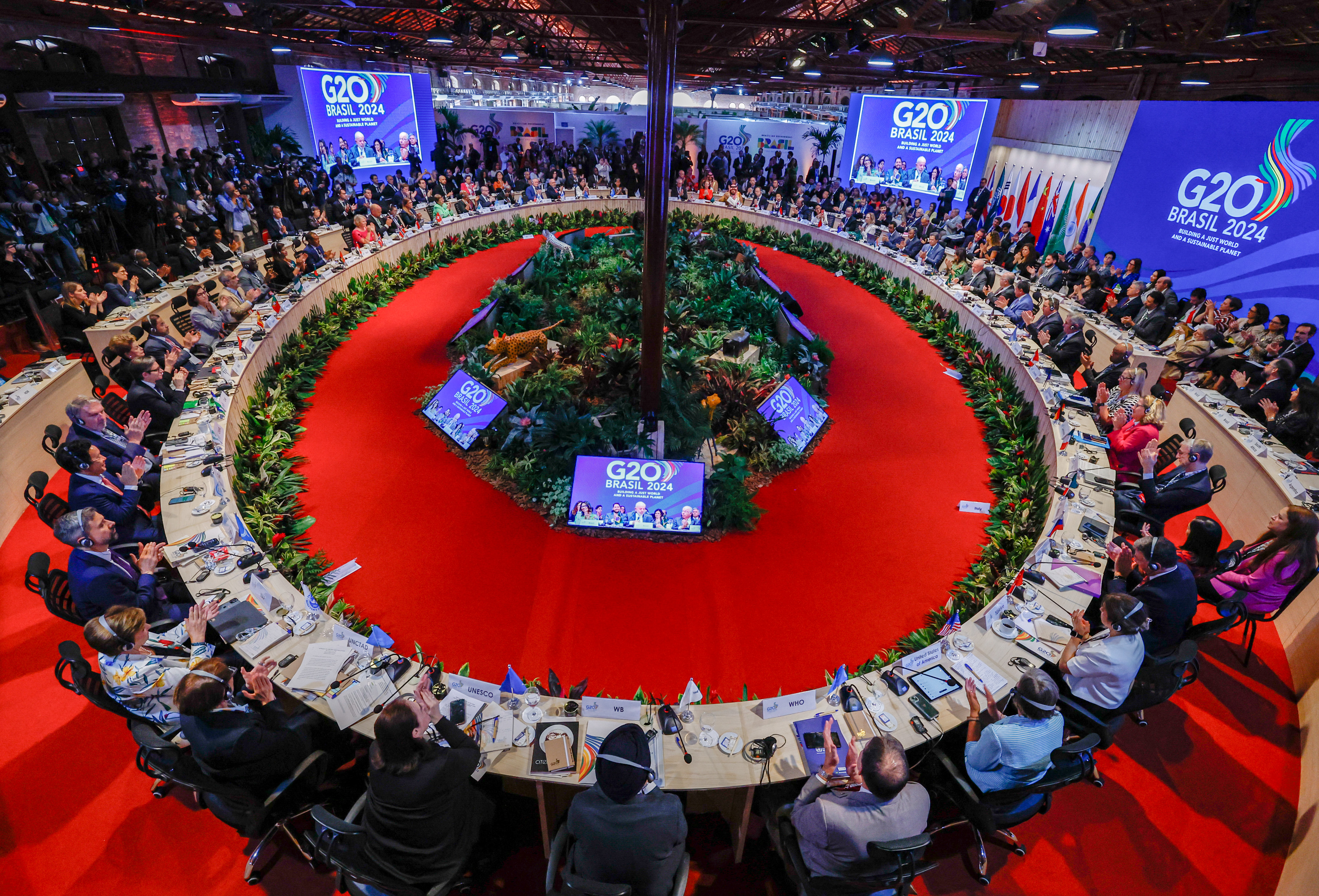
Ministerial meeting on launch of the Global Alliance Against Hunger and Poverty

On 24 July 2024, the Global Alliance Against Hunger and Poverty multilateral treaty was drafted by the federal government of Brazil, with the G20 countries and international organizations, to support and accelerate efforts to eradicate hunger and poverty, while reducing inequalities. The ratification by all parties is expected for November 2024 during the leaders summit.

== Preparations ==
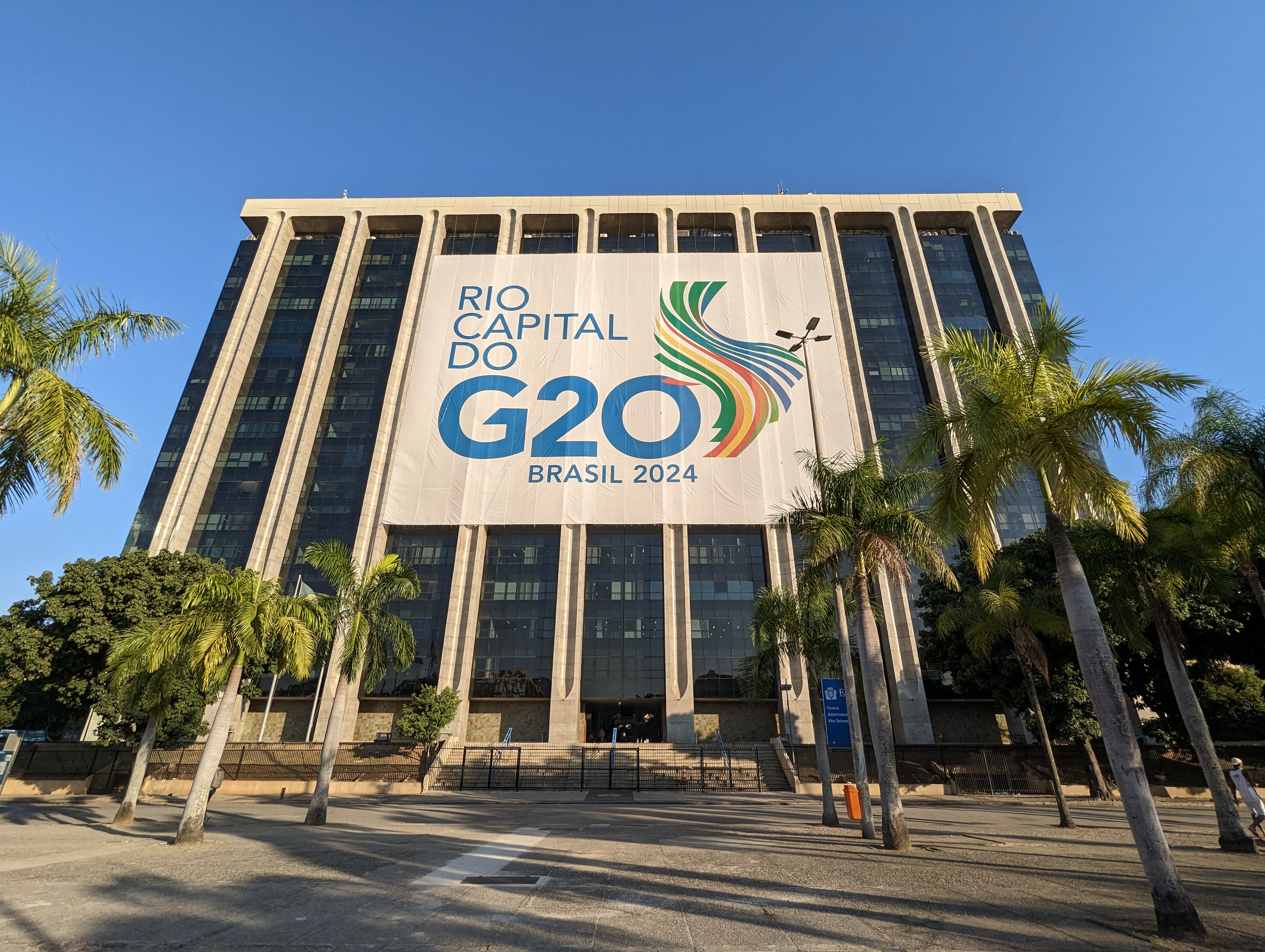
Banner promoting the G20 events on the municipal prefecture of Rio de Janeiro

The government of Brazil budgeted R$ 300 million (US$60 million) for the G20 events in 15 cities. For the security of the foreign ministers event in February 21–22, the government has deployed 1,200 security personnel of the Armed Forces and the Federal Police. The Museum of Modern Art in Rio, housing sixteen thousand works of art, the main venue of the summit, underwent an extensive renovation and restoration, budgeted in R$ 40 million (US$7.6 million).

In April, the Police of Rio de Janeiro simulated a terrorist attack against the Christ the Redeemer statue as part of an exercise in preparation for the leaders summit. The Santos Dumont Airport will be closed for the leaders summit, and an aerial exclusion zone will be implemented by the Brazilian Air Force. For the leaders summit, the government has deployed 20,000 security personnel of the Armed Forces and National Force together with eight intelligence centers.

== Issues ==
=== Russia and Ukraine ===
Following the Russian invasion of Ukraine, the International Criminal Court issued an arrest warrant for war crimes against Russian president Vladimir Putin. On 9 September 2023, Lula stated that Putin "can attend next year's G20 summit in Rio de Janeiro without fear", adding that "if I'm Brazil's president, and if he comes to Brazil, there's no reason he'll be arrested". His chief foreign policy advisor, Celso Amorim, later confirmed the government's intention to invite Putin to the summit. However, in December 2023, Lula said that Putin could be arrested in Brazil, but that would be decided by Brazil's independent courts, not his government.

On 18 October 2024, President Vladimir Putin announced that he will not go to the summit, "my possible visit would wreck the group's work", stated Putin.

=== Other issues ===
Dialogue on the rising of global temperatures and the principles of the digital economy were among themes of the agenda. The Brazilian presidency also prioritised discussions on the Gaza war and growing bloc confrontation between the United States and China.

Work at the summit was also directed to promoting global debt reform.

During a speech about fake news, Rosângela Lula da Silva, first lady of Brazil, swore at Elon Musk, saying: "I'm not afraid of you. Fuck you, Elon Musk" (Eu não tenho medo de você. Inclusive, fuck you, Elon Musk, in Portuguese). Hours later, he wrote on X (formerly Twitter): "They're going to lose the elections soon", responding to a post with Janja's video.

== Participating leaders ==
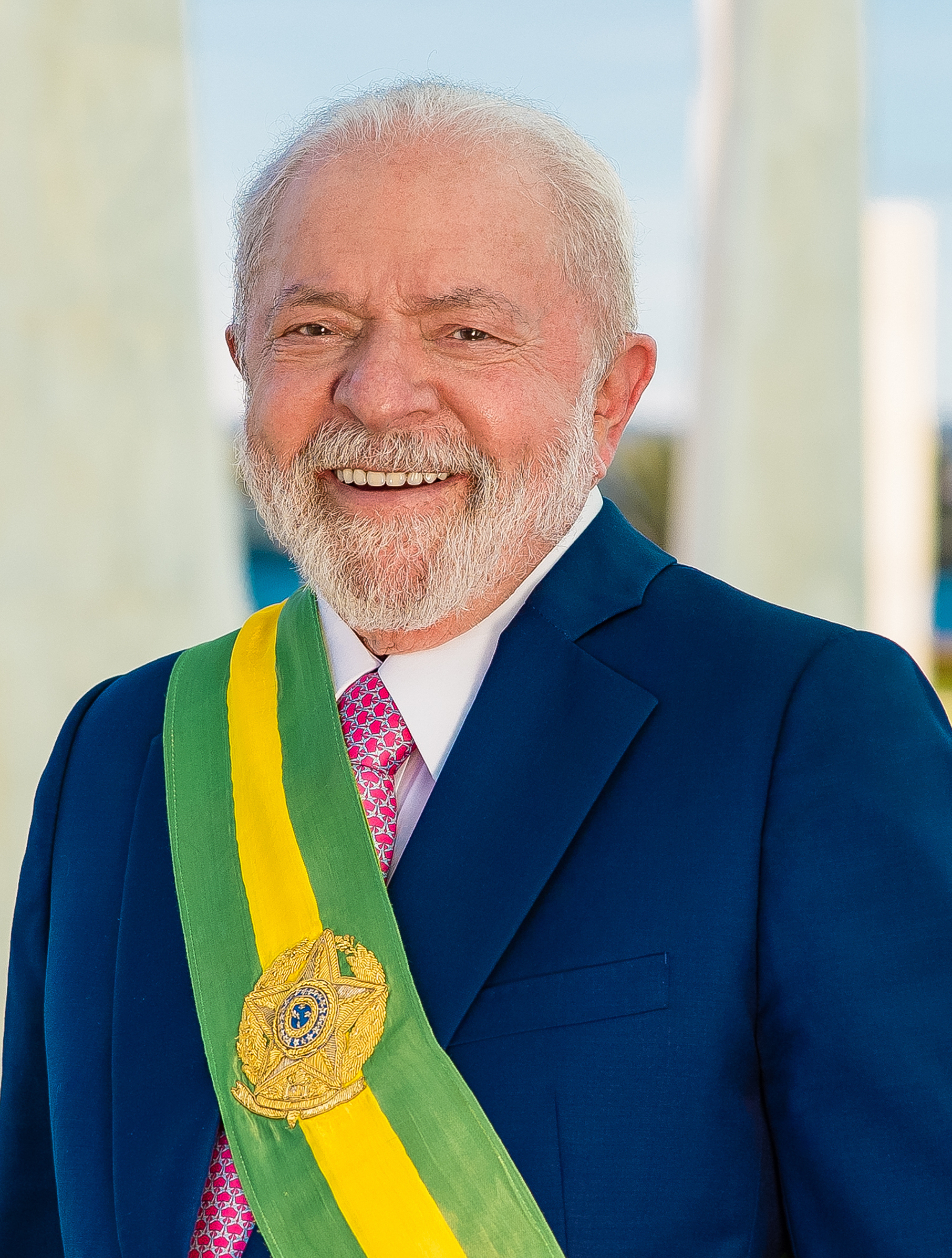
Brazil
Luiz Inácio Lula da Silva, President
(Host)

United States
Joe Biden, President

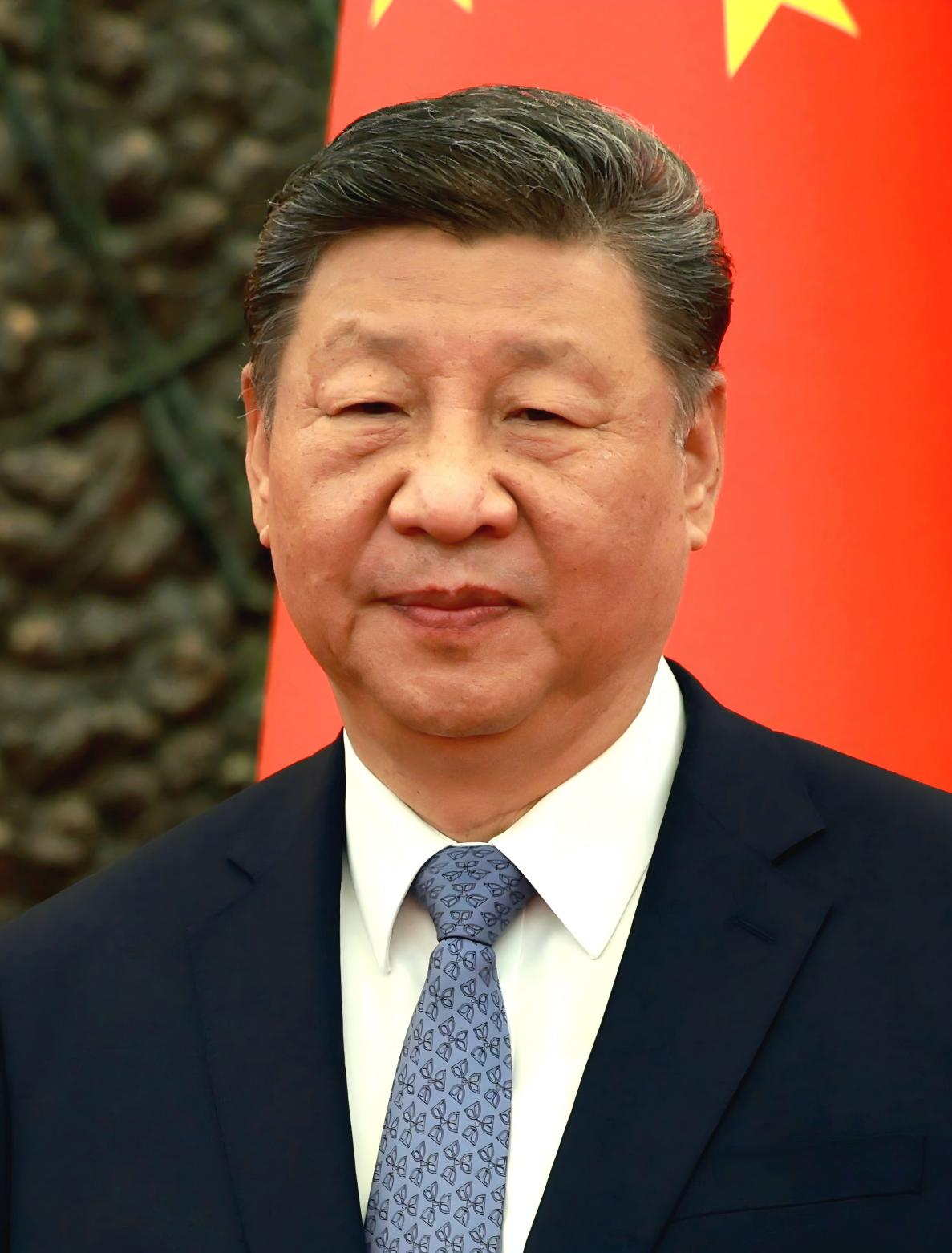
China
Xi Jinping, CCP General Secretary and President (Note: The president of China is legally a ceremonial office, but the general secretary of the Chinese Communist Party (de facto leader in a one-party communist state) has always held this office since 1993 except for the months of transition, and the current general secretary is Xi Jinping, who is also the Chinese president.) (Note: Absent from the 2023 summit in India, the paramount leader of China, Xi Jinping, is expected to be present at the Rio summit, as part of a state visit to Brazil, celebrating 50 years of diplomatic relations between the two countries, and following Lula's visit to Beijing in 2023.)

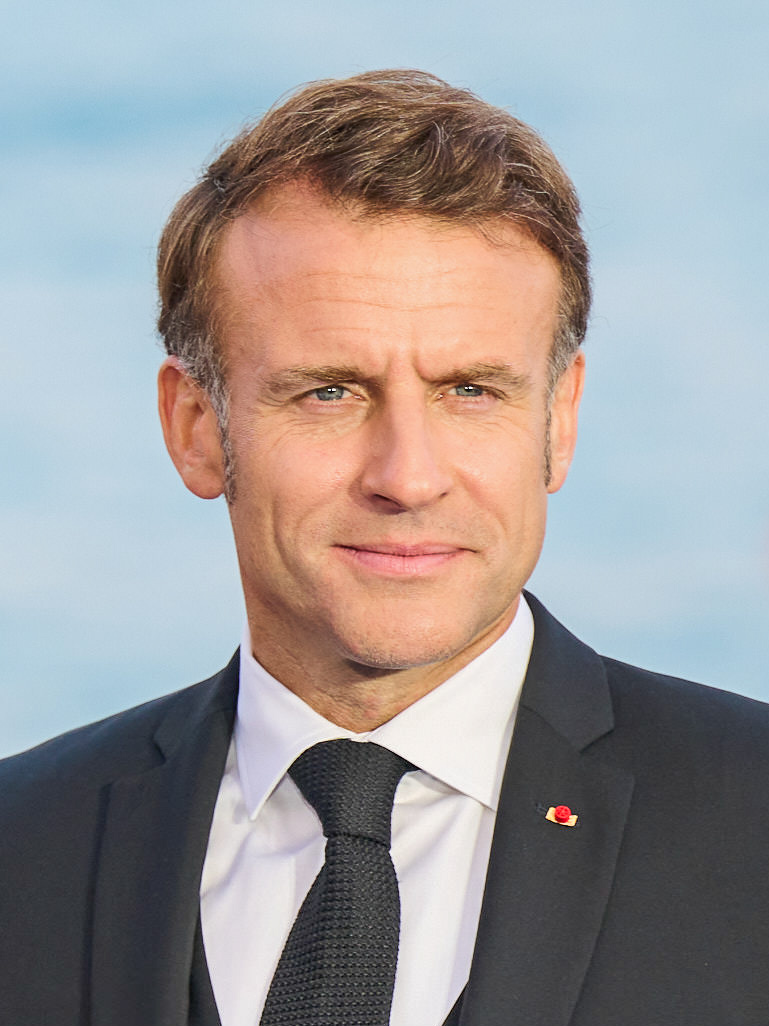
France
Emmanuel Macron, President

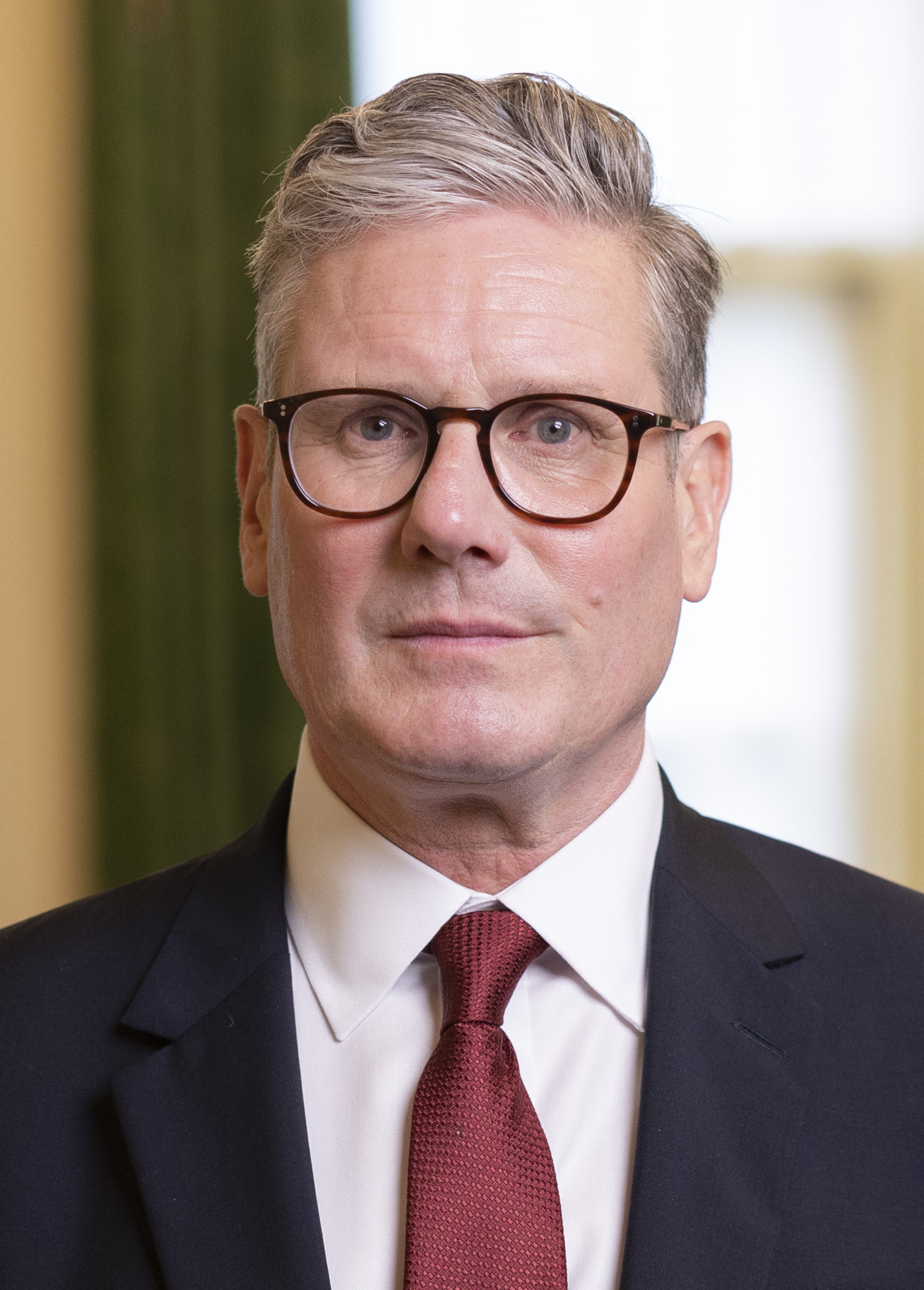
United Kingdom
Keir Starmer, Prime Minister

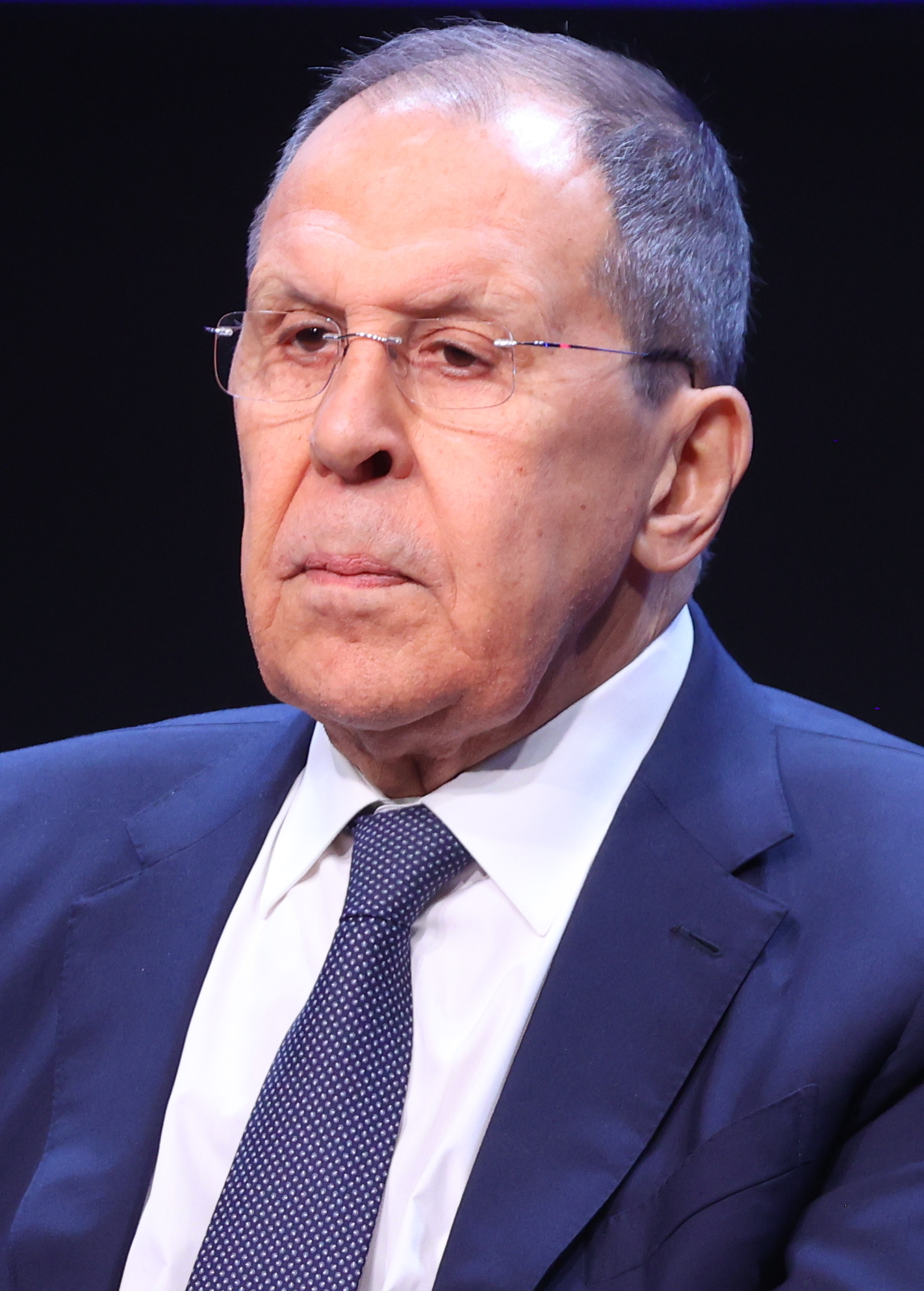
Russia
Sergey Lavrov, Foreign Minister

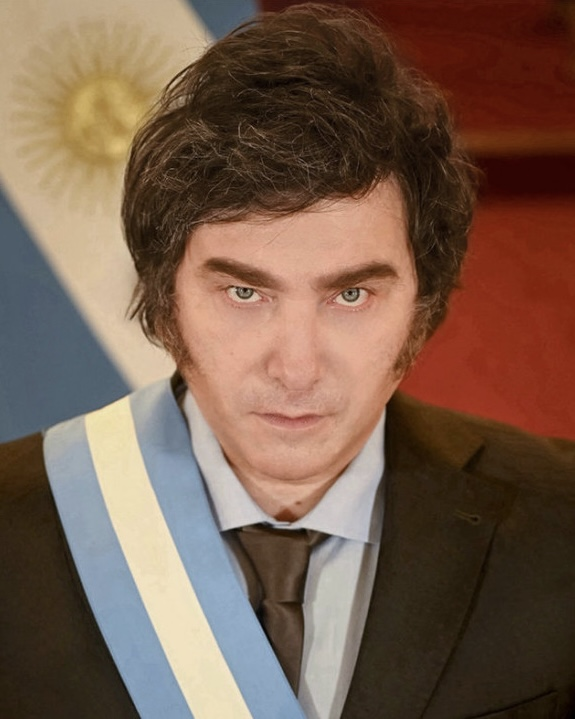
Argentina
Javier Milei, President

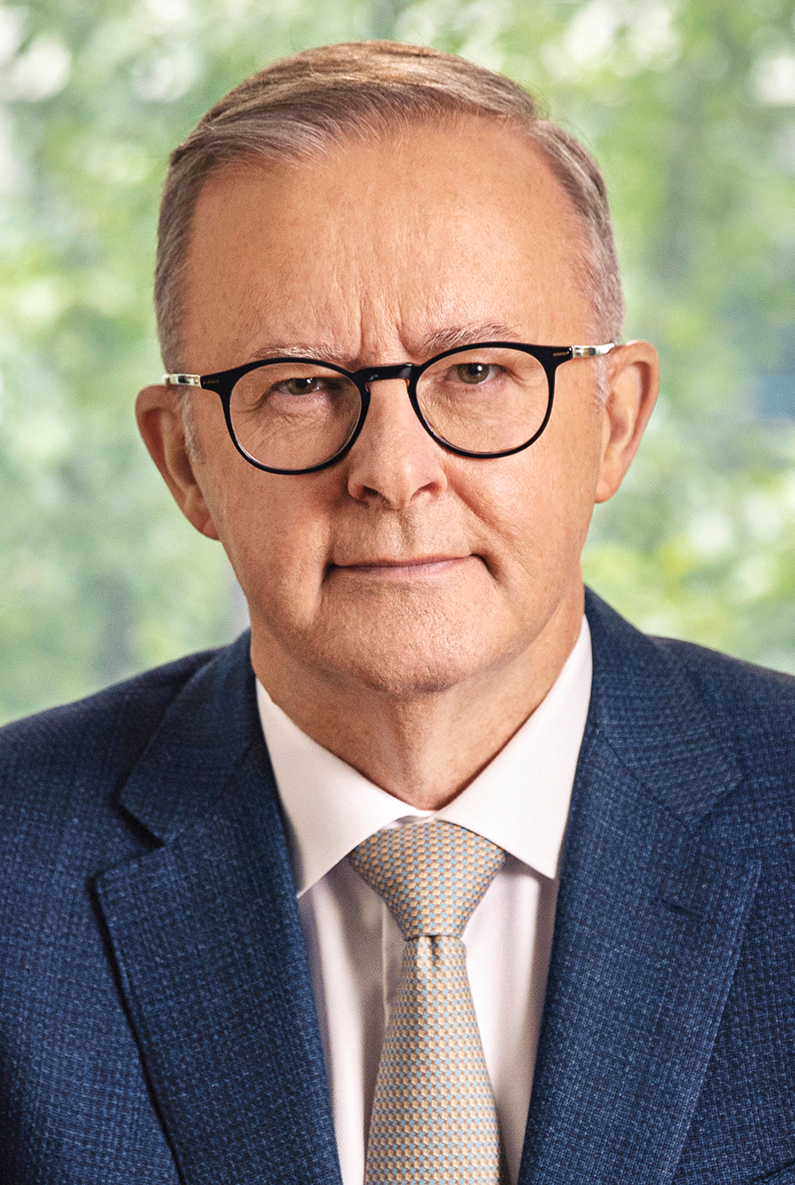
Australia
Anthony Albanese, Prime Minister

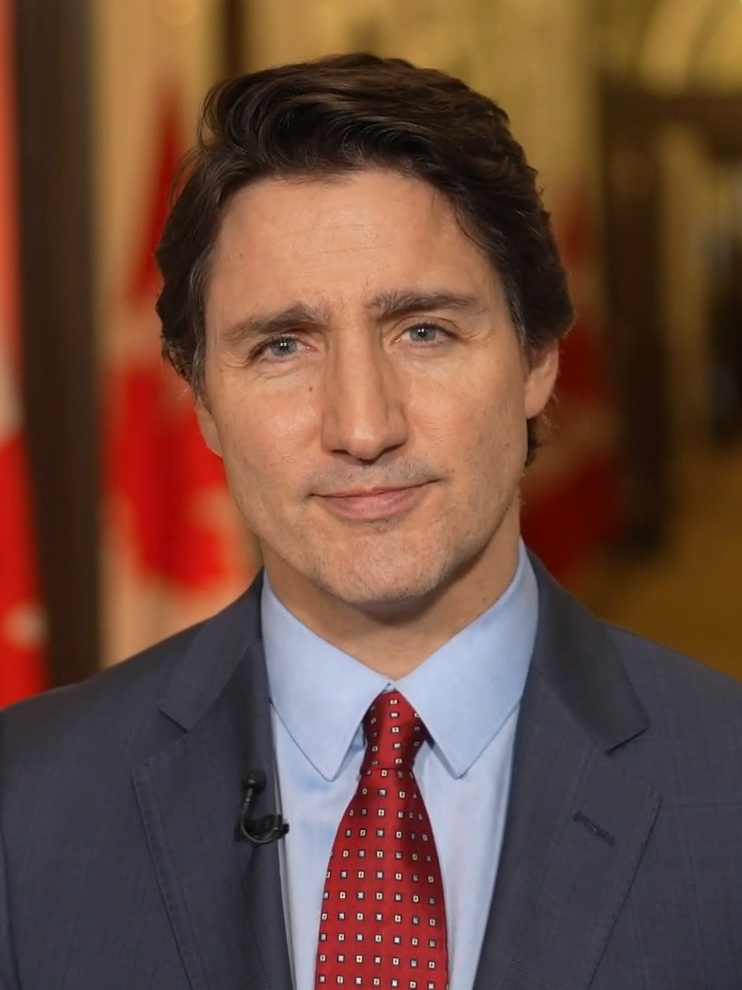
Canada
Justin Trudeau, Prime Minister

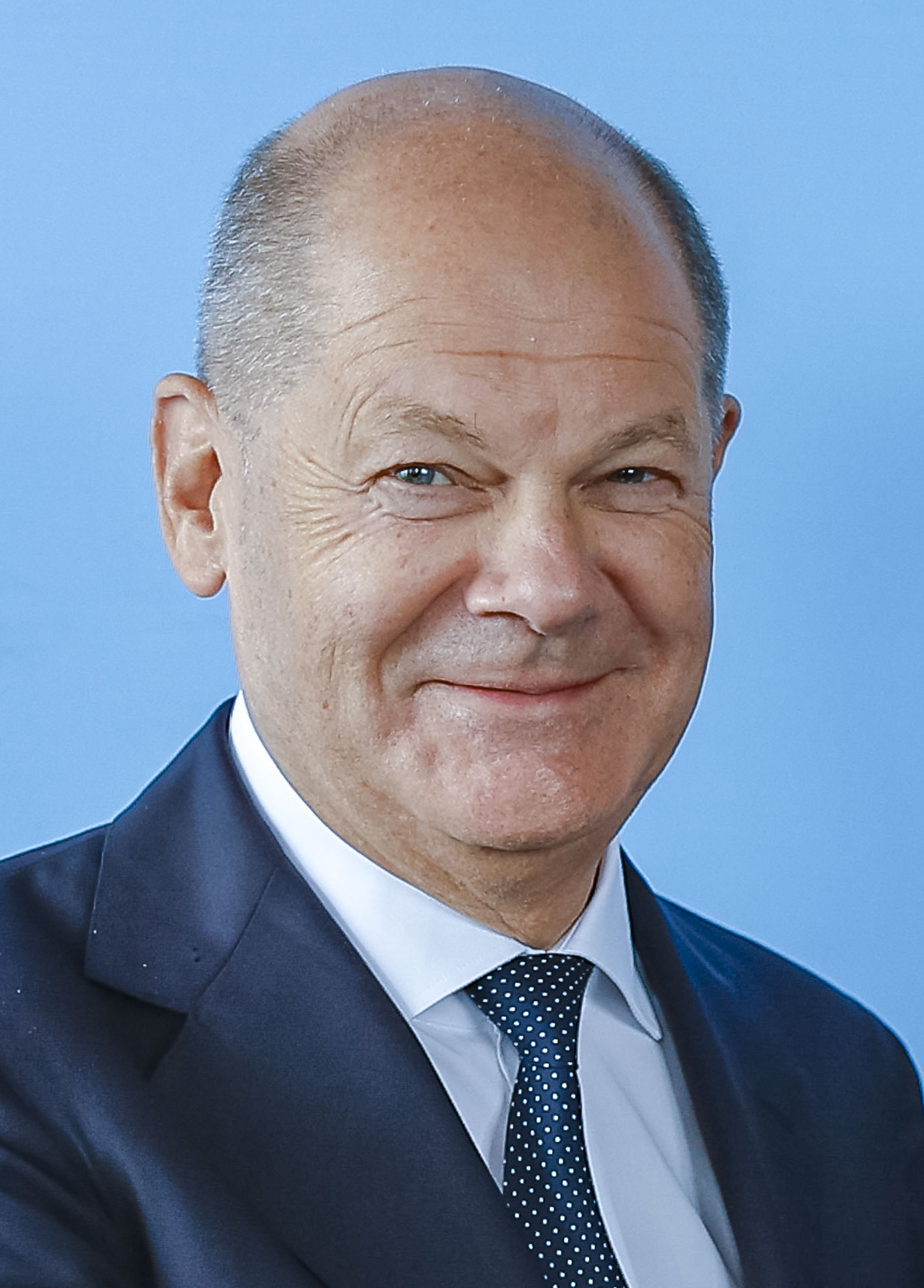
Germany
Olaf Scholz, Chancellor

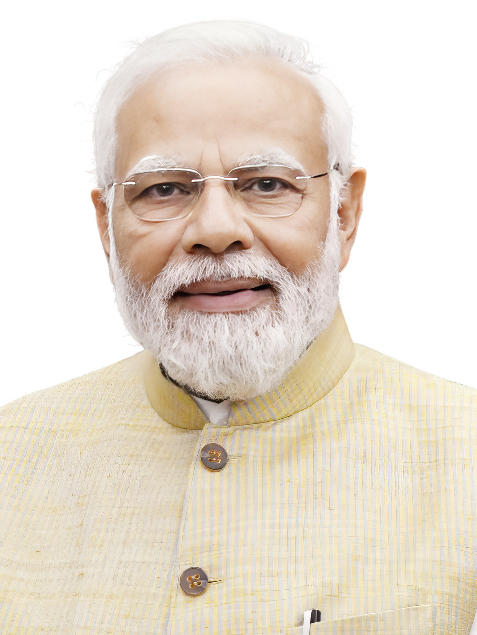
India
Narendra Modi, Prime Minister

Indonesia
Prabowo Subianto, President

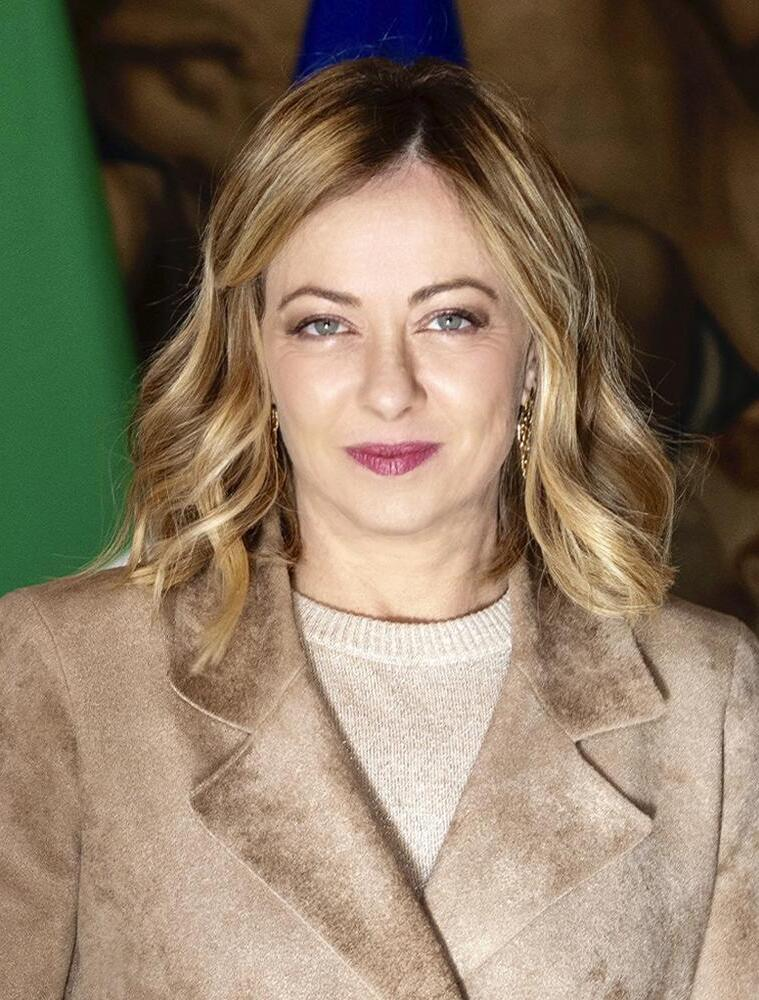
Italy
Giorgia Meloni, Prime Minister

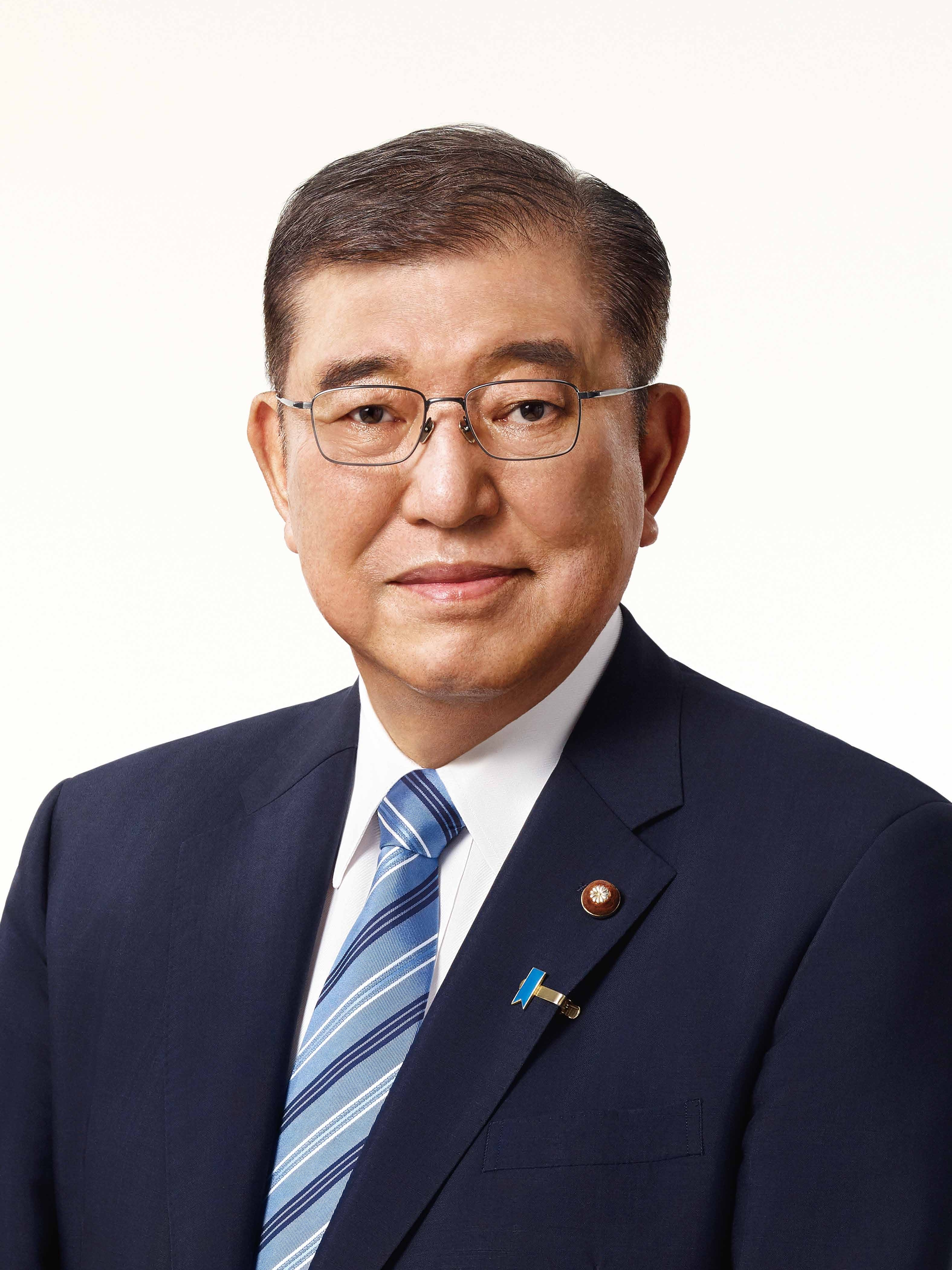
Japan
Shigeru Ishiba, Prime Minister

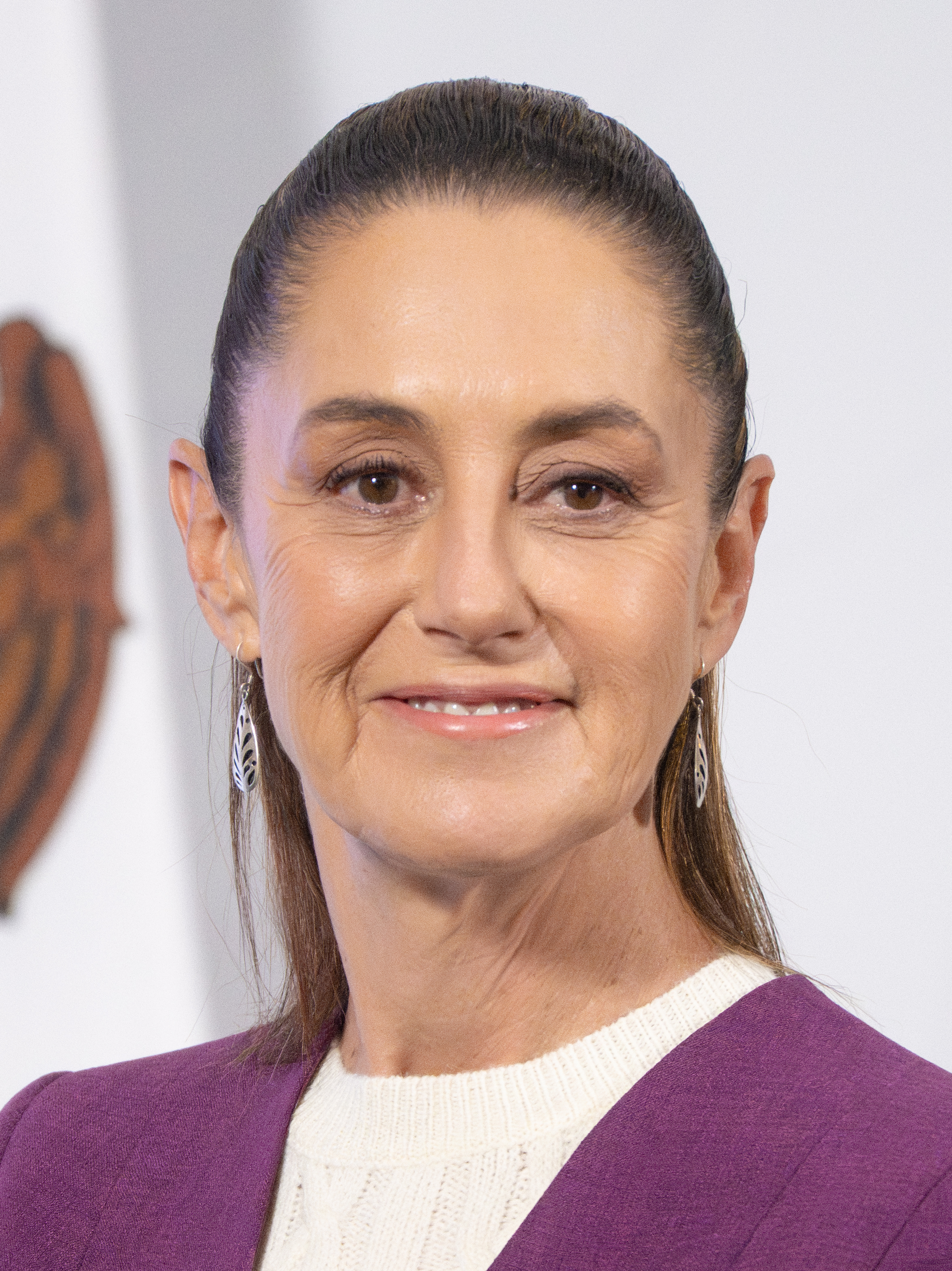
Mexico
Claudia Sheinbaum, President

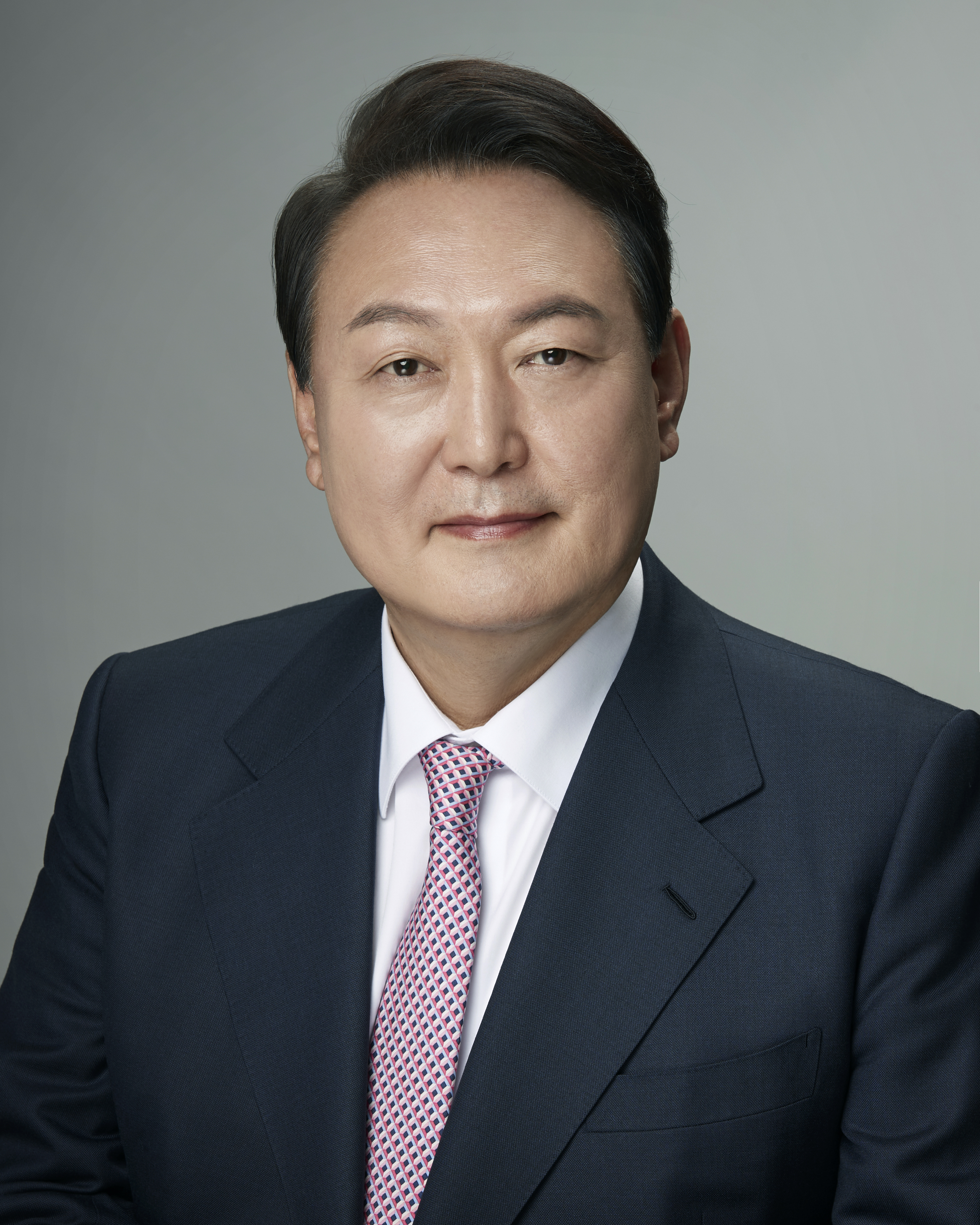
South Korea
Yoon Suk Yeol, President

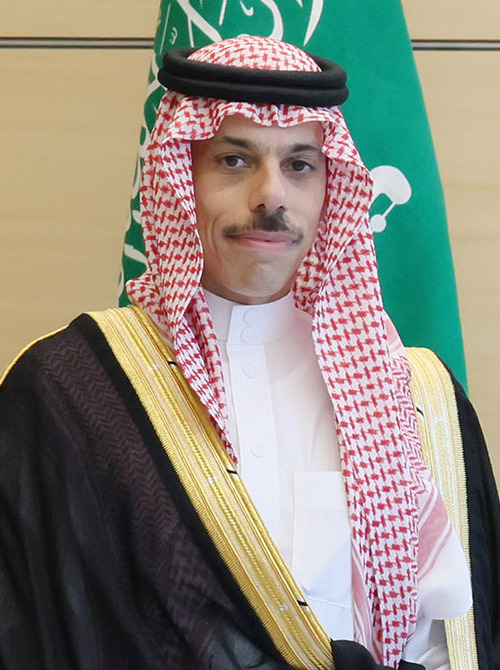
Saudi Arabia
Faisal bin Farhan Al Saud, Foreign Minister

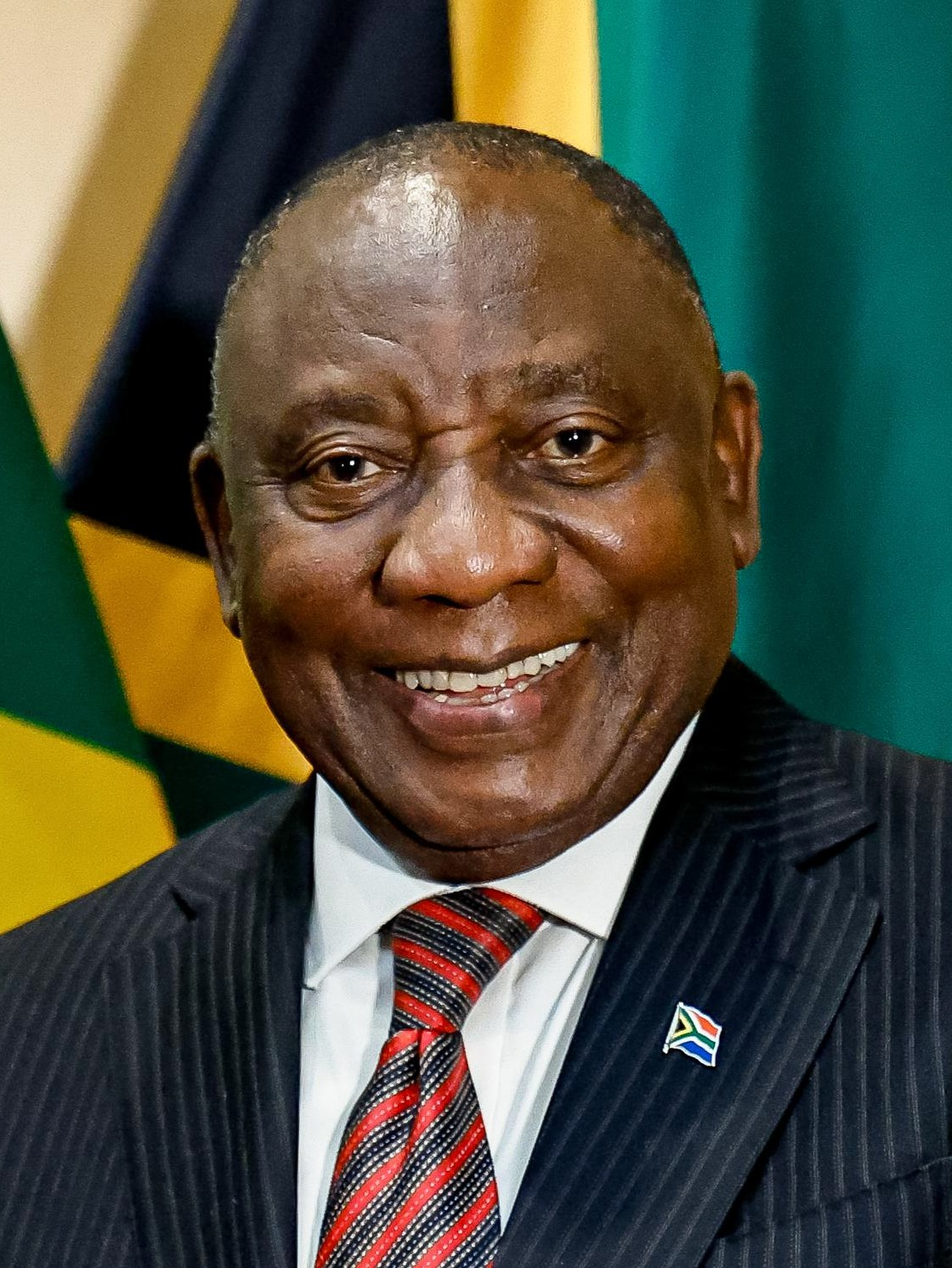
South Africa
Cyril Ramaphosa, President

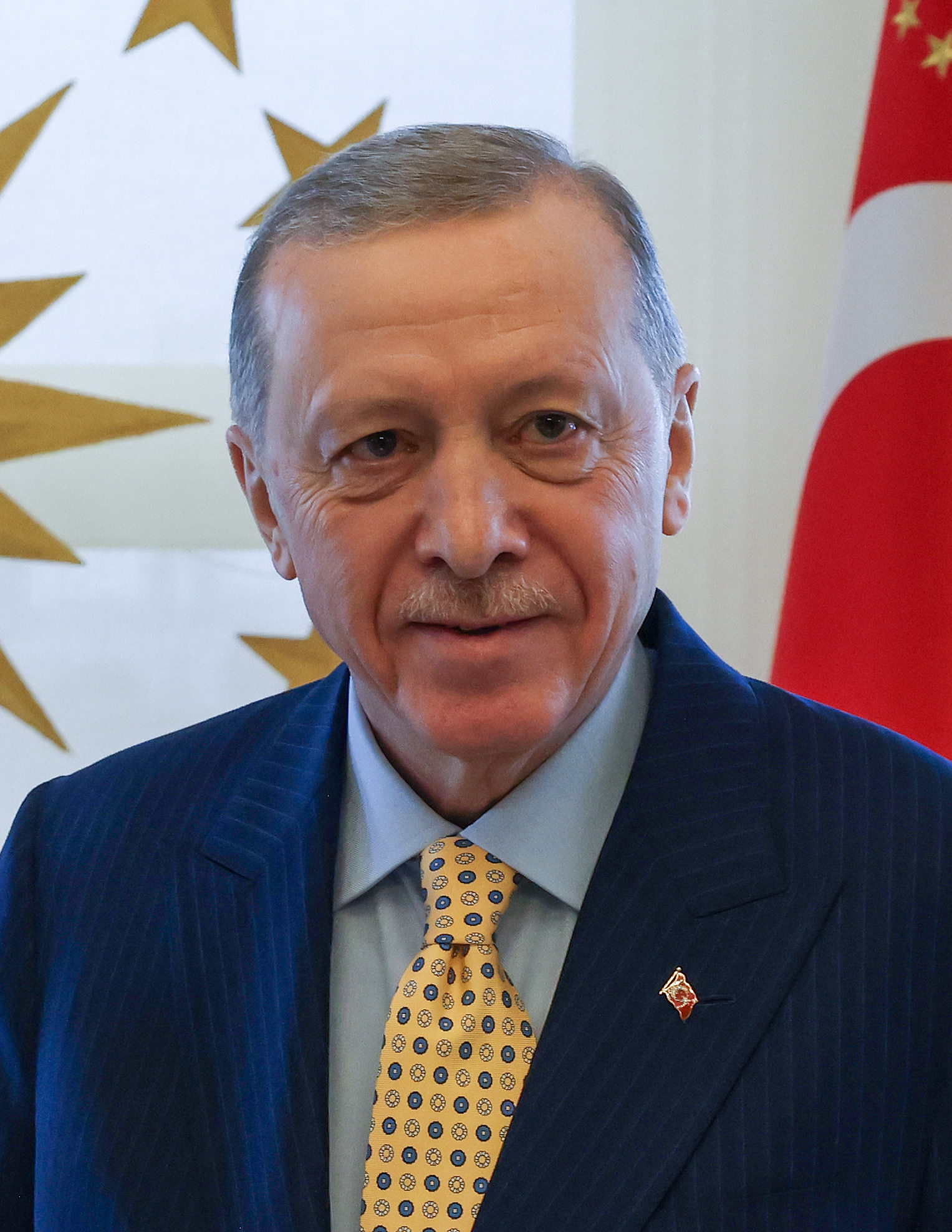
Turkey
Recep Tayyip Erdogan, President

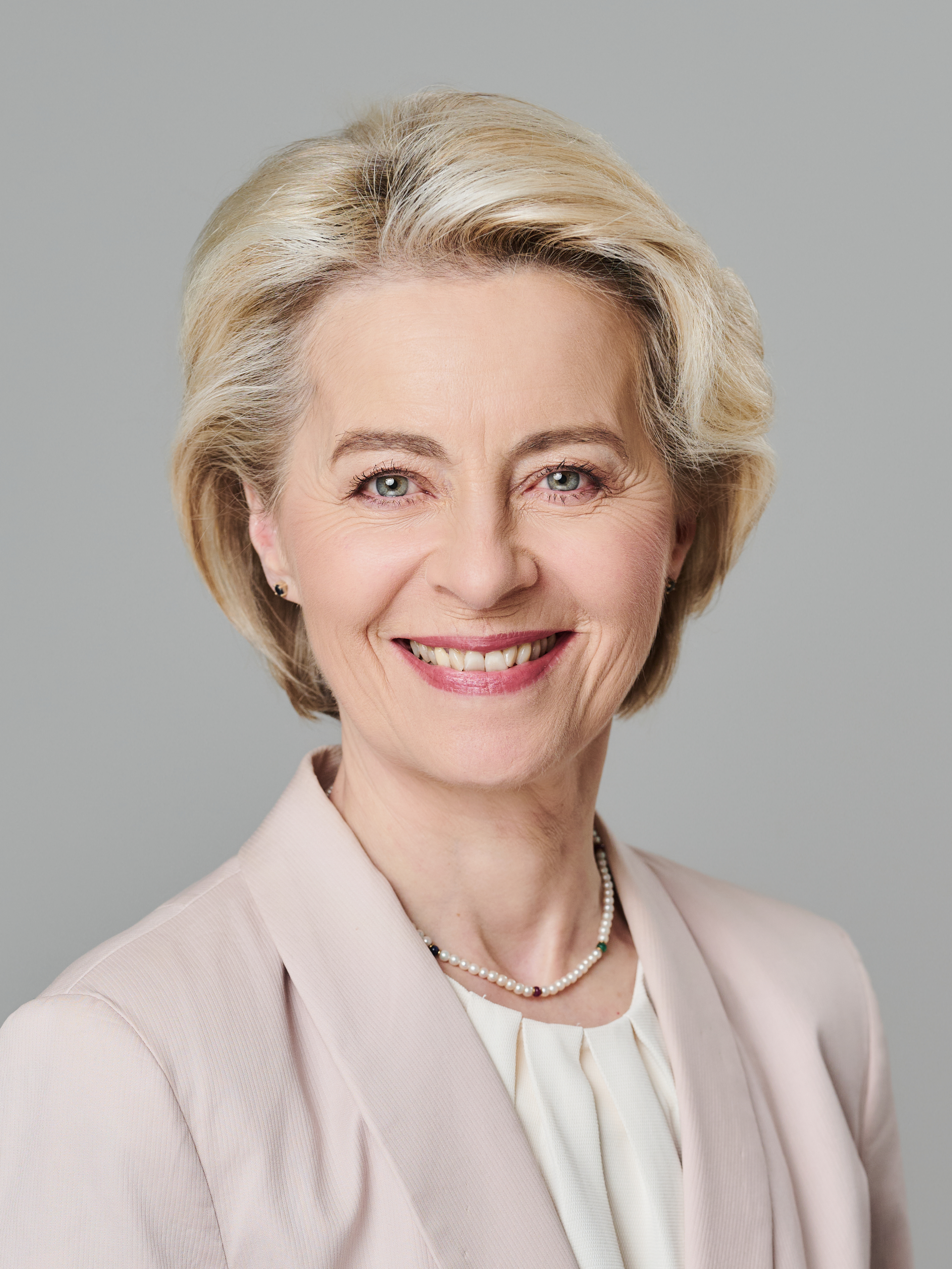
European Union
Ursula von der Leyen, President of the European Commission

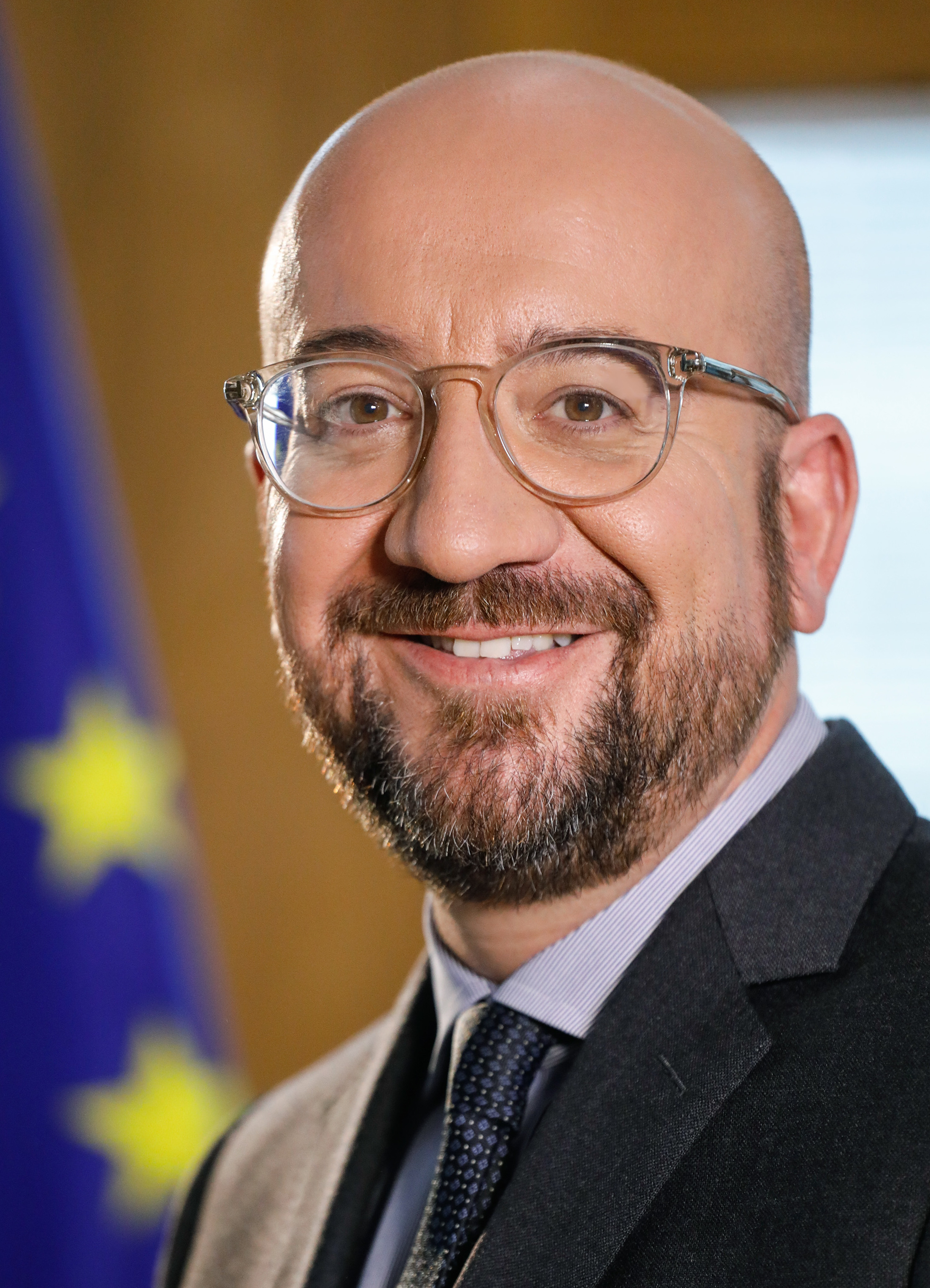
European Union
Charles Michel, President of the European Council

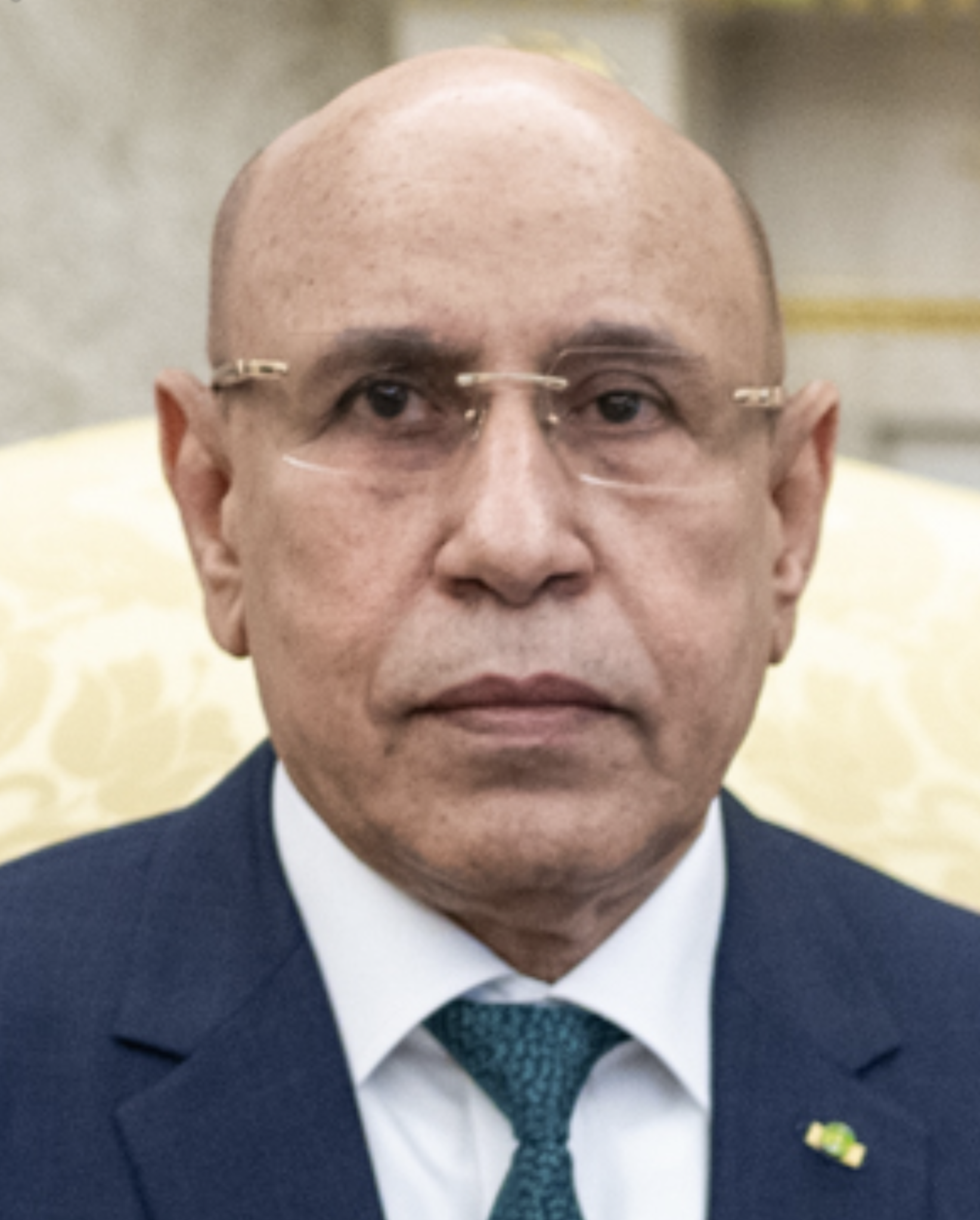
African Union
Mauritania
Mohamed Ould Ghazouani,
2024 Chairperson of the African Union and President of Mauritania

== Invited guests ==
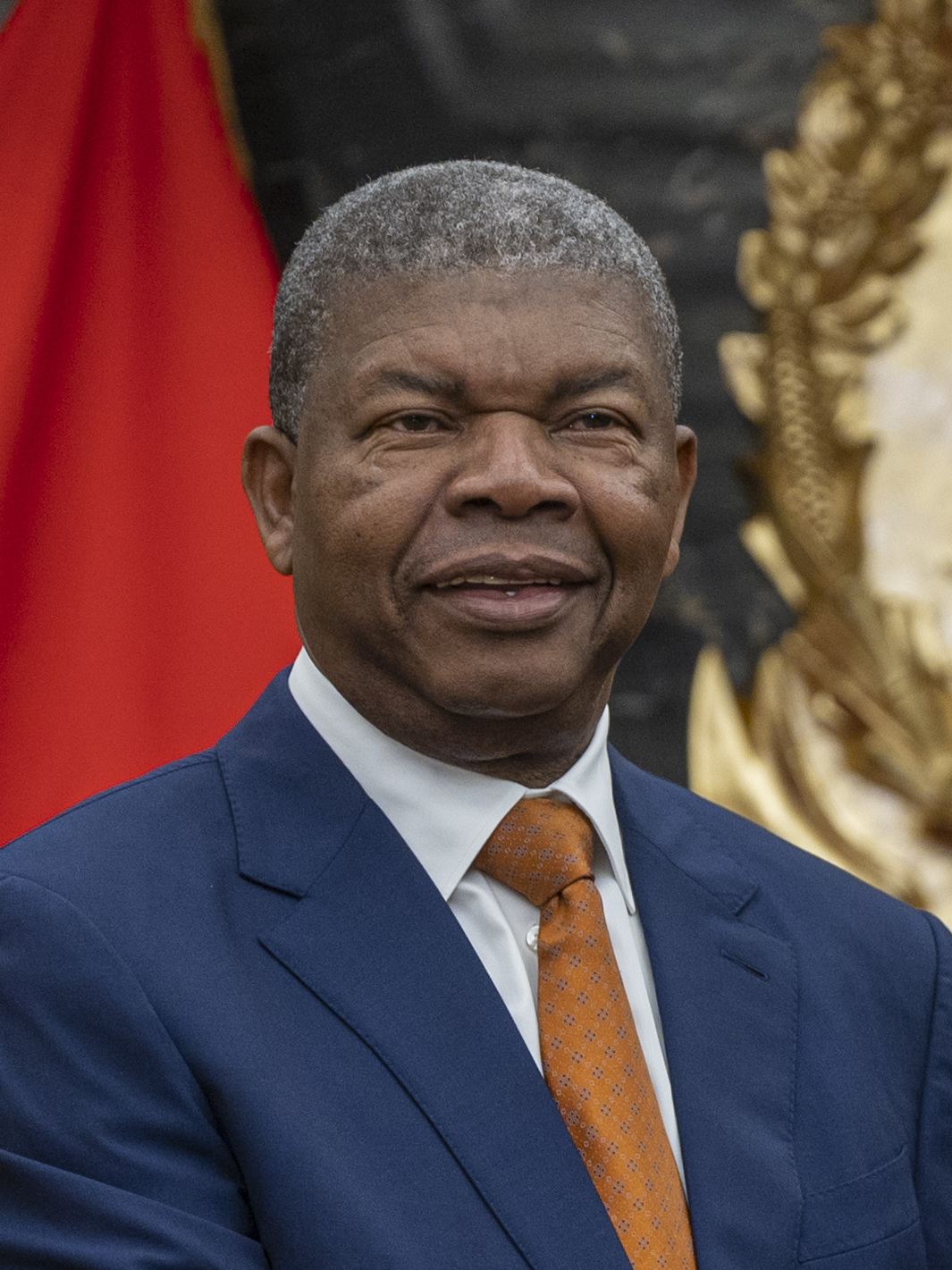
Angola
João Lourenço, President
guest invitee

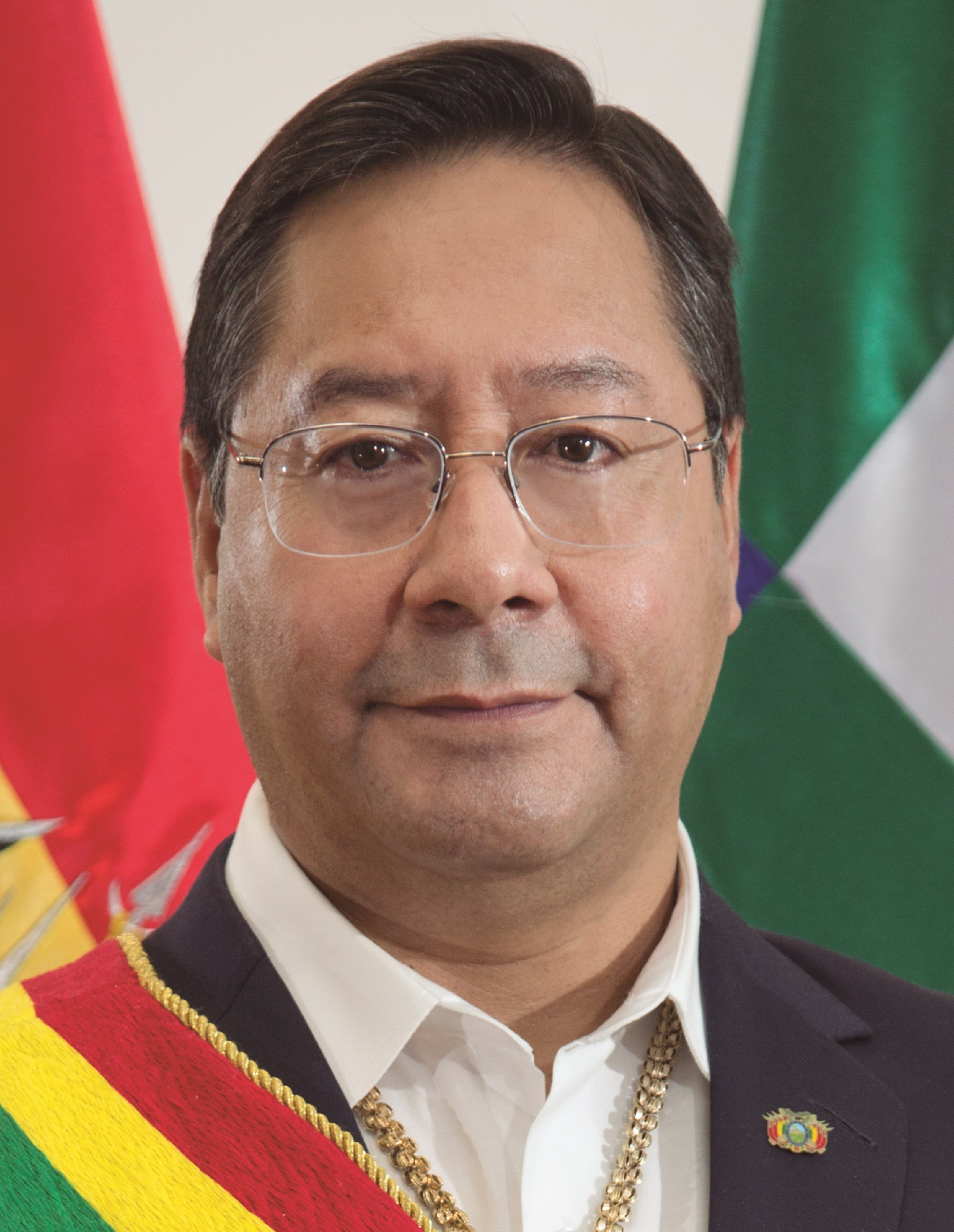
Bolivia
Luis Arce, President
guest invitee

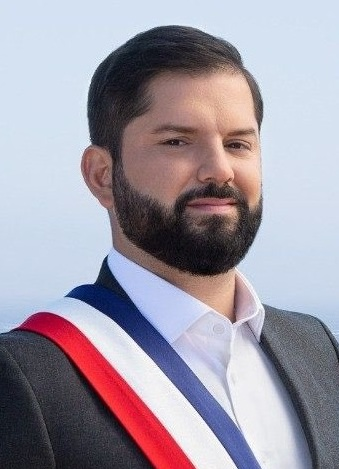
Chile
Gabriel Boric, President
guest invitee

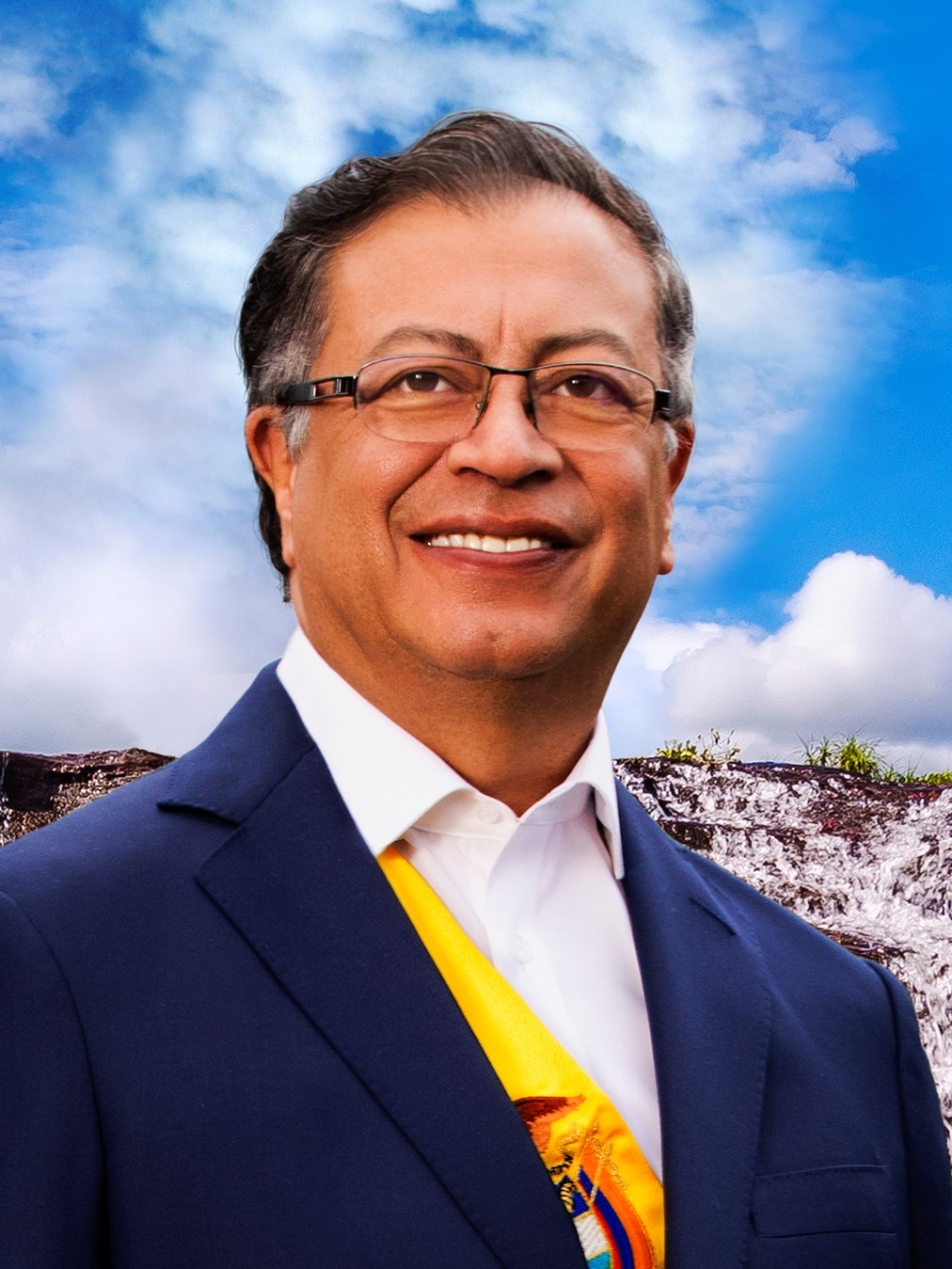
Colombia
Gustavo Petro, President
guest invitee

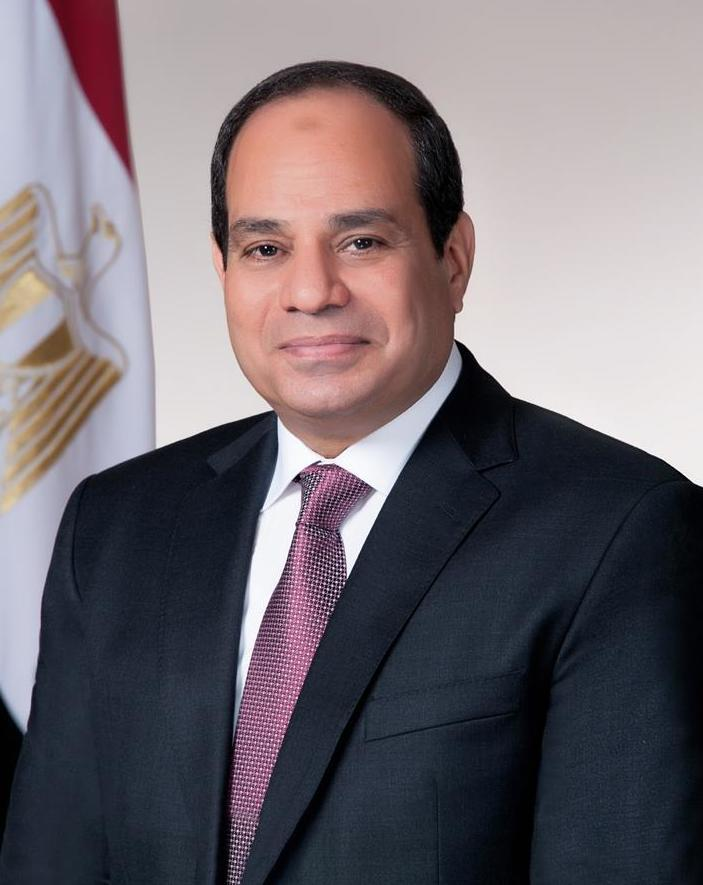
Egypt
Abdel Fattah el-Sisi, President
guest invitee

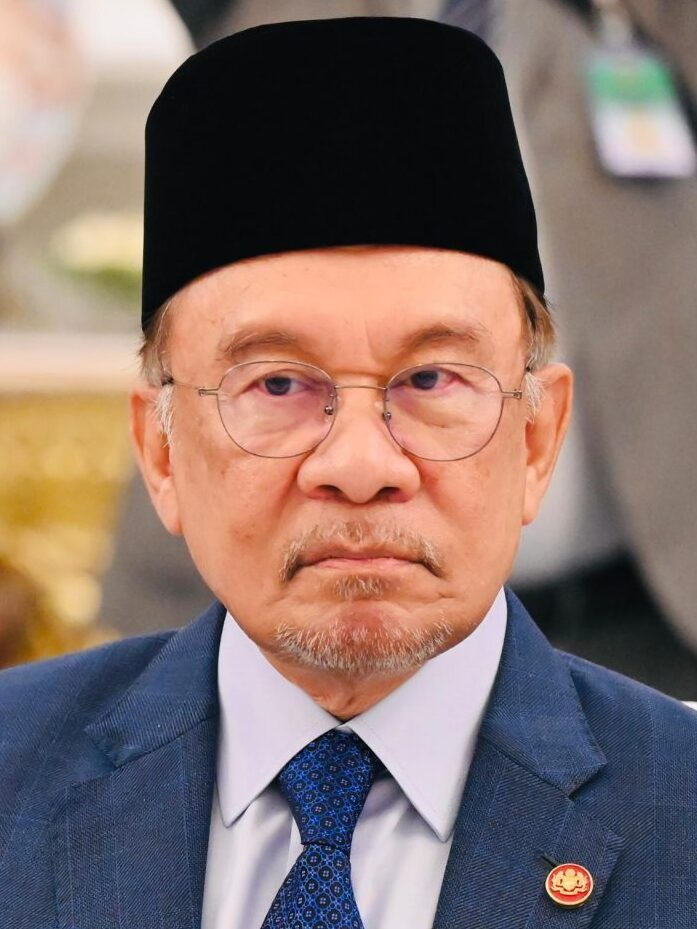
Malaysia
Anwar Ibrahim, Prime Minister
guest invitee

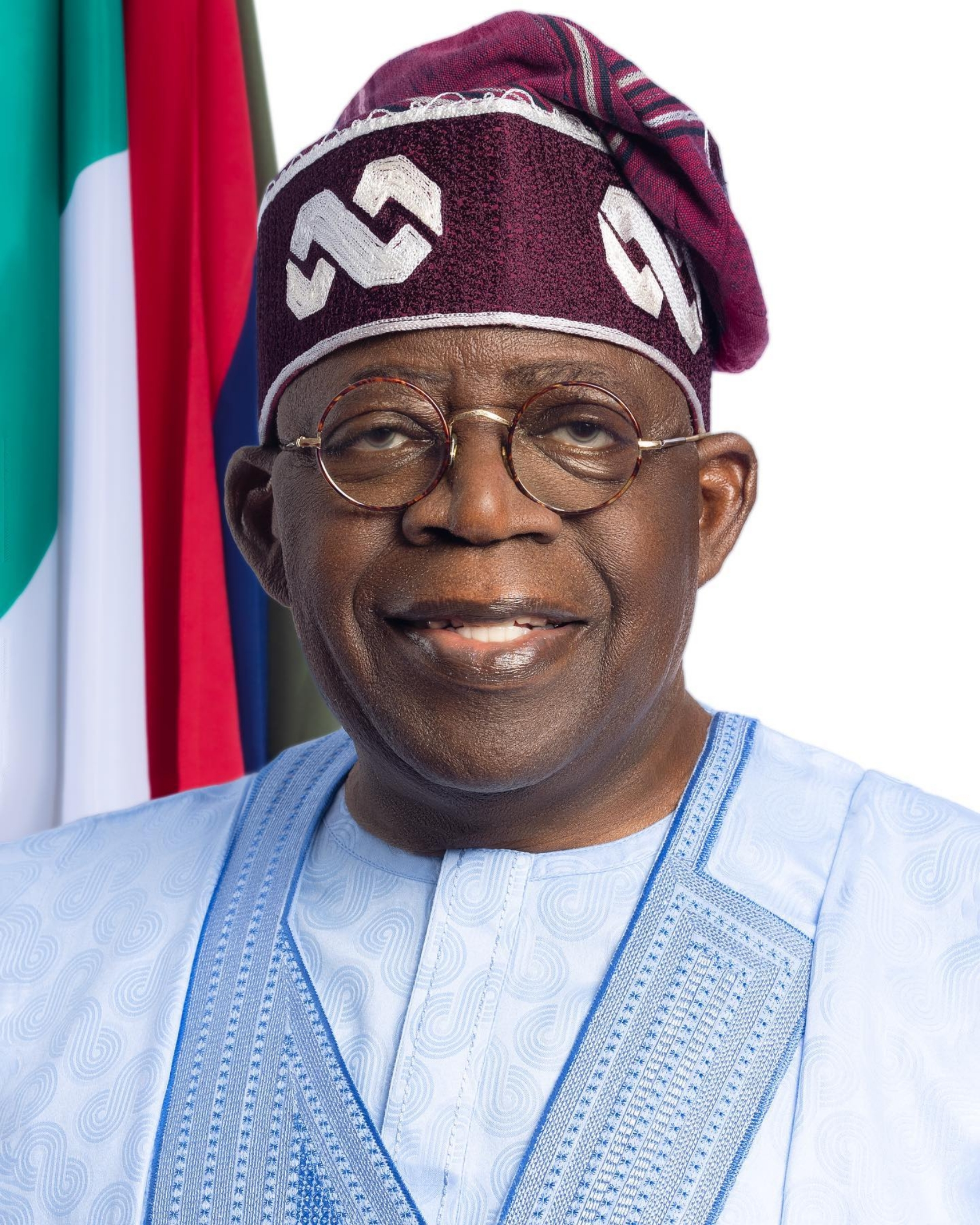
Nigeria
Bola Tinubu, President
guest invitee

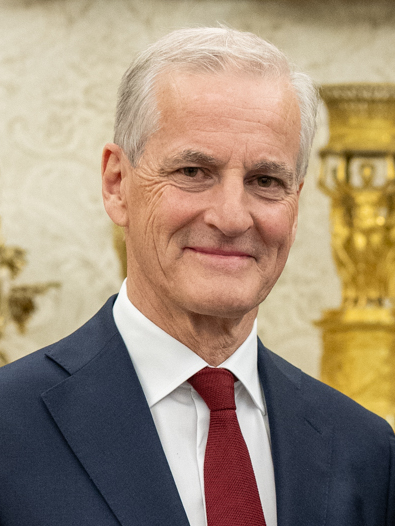
Norway
Jonas Gahr Støre, Prime Minister
guest invitee

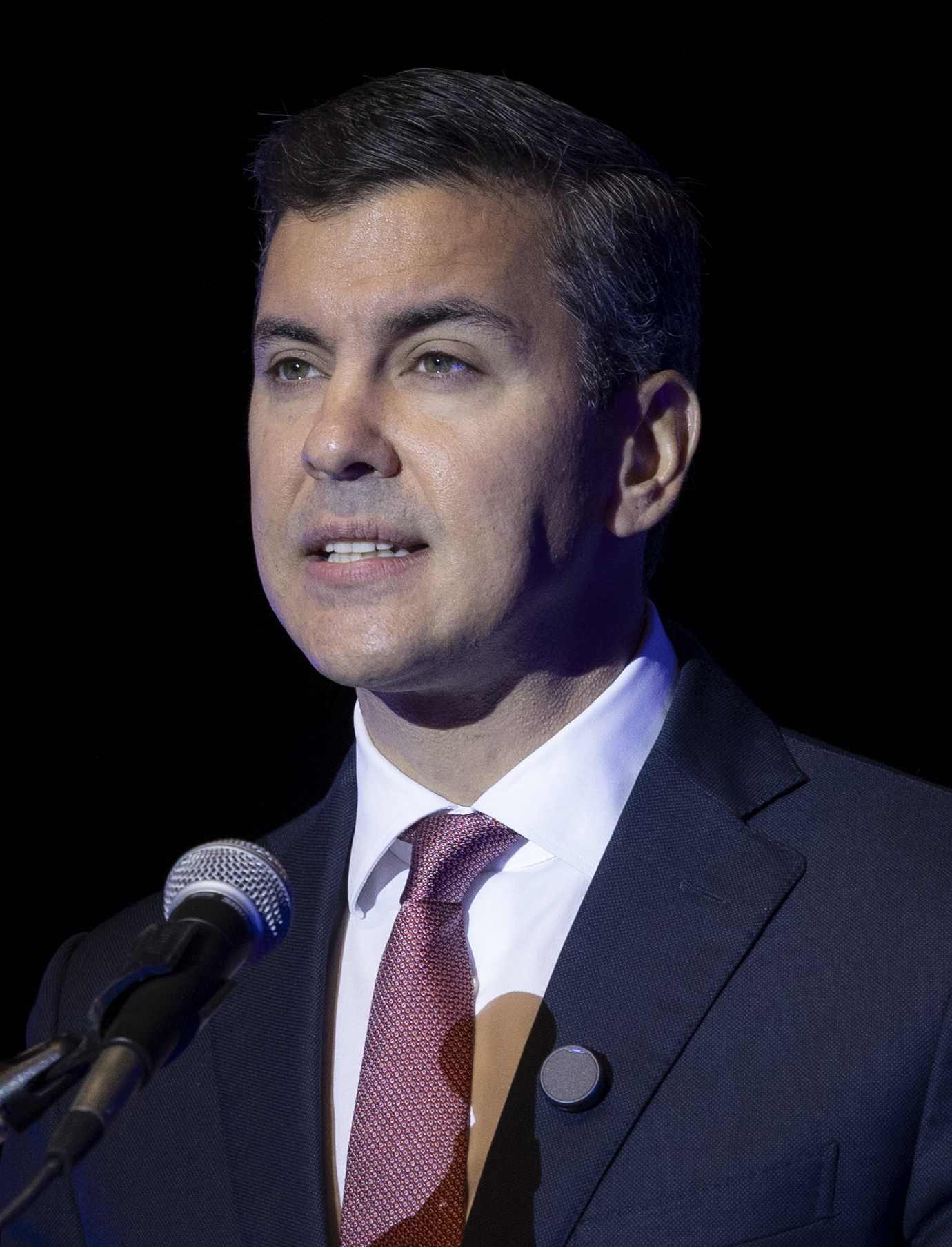
Paraguay
Santiago Peña, President
guest invitee

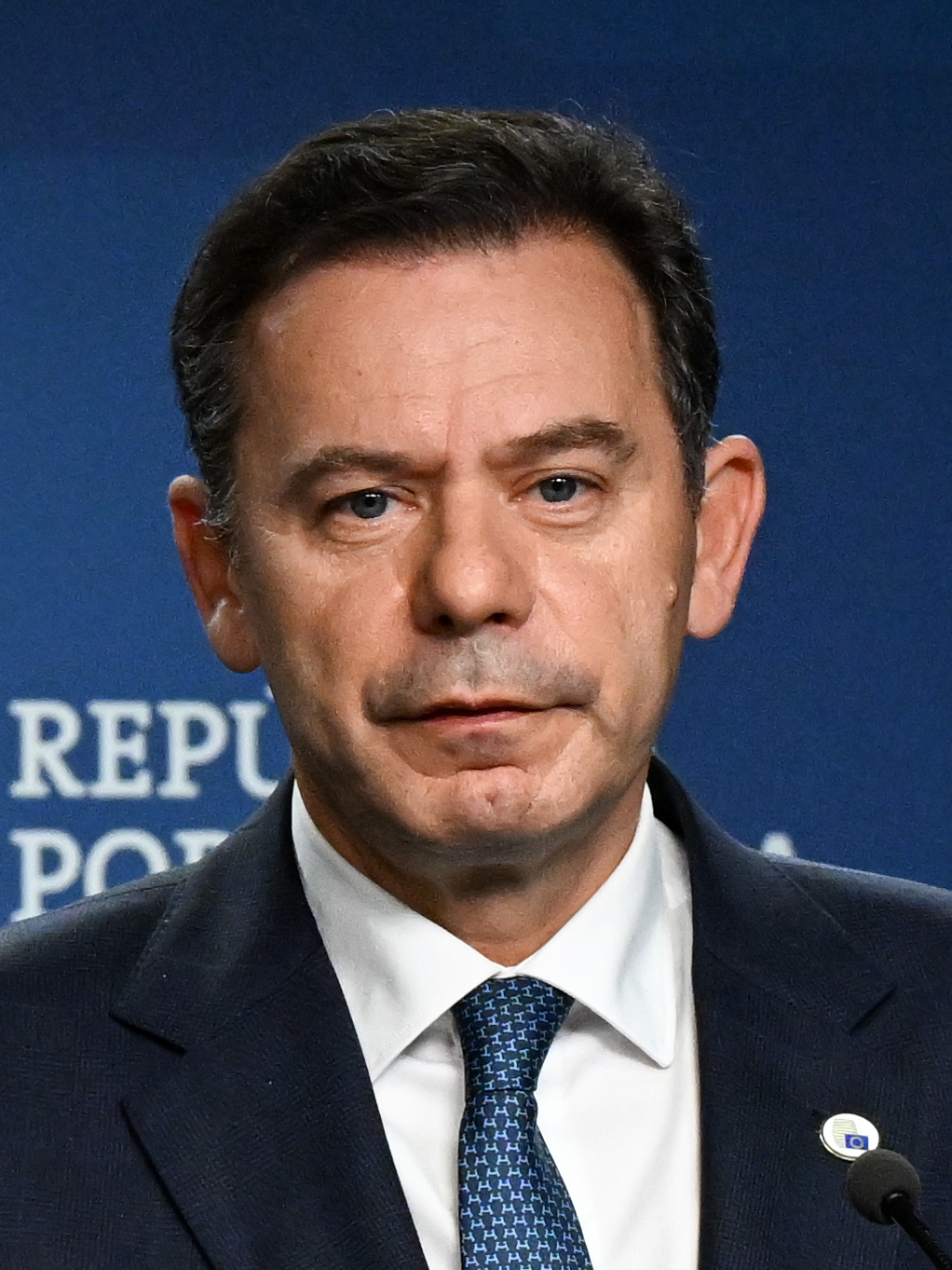
Portugal
Luís Montenegro, Prime Minister
guest invitee

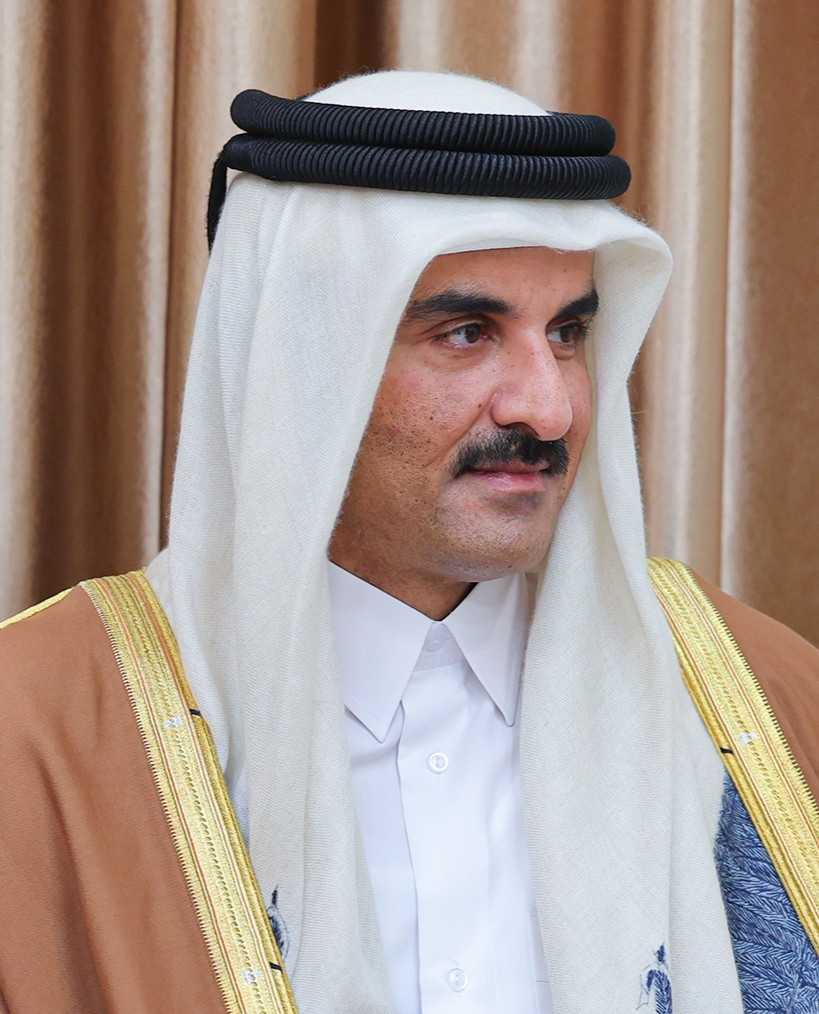
Qatar
Tamim bin Hamad Al Thani, Emir
guest invitee

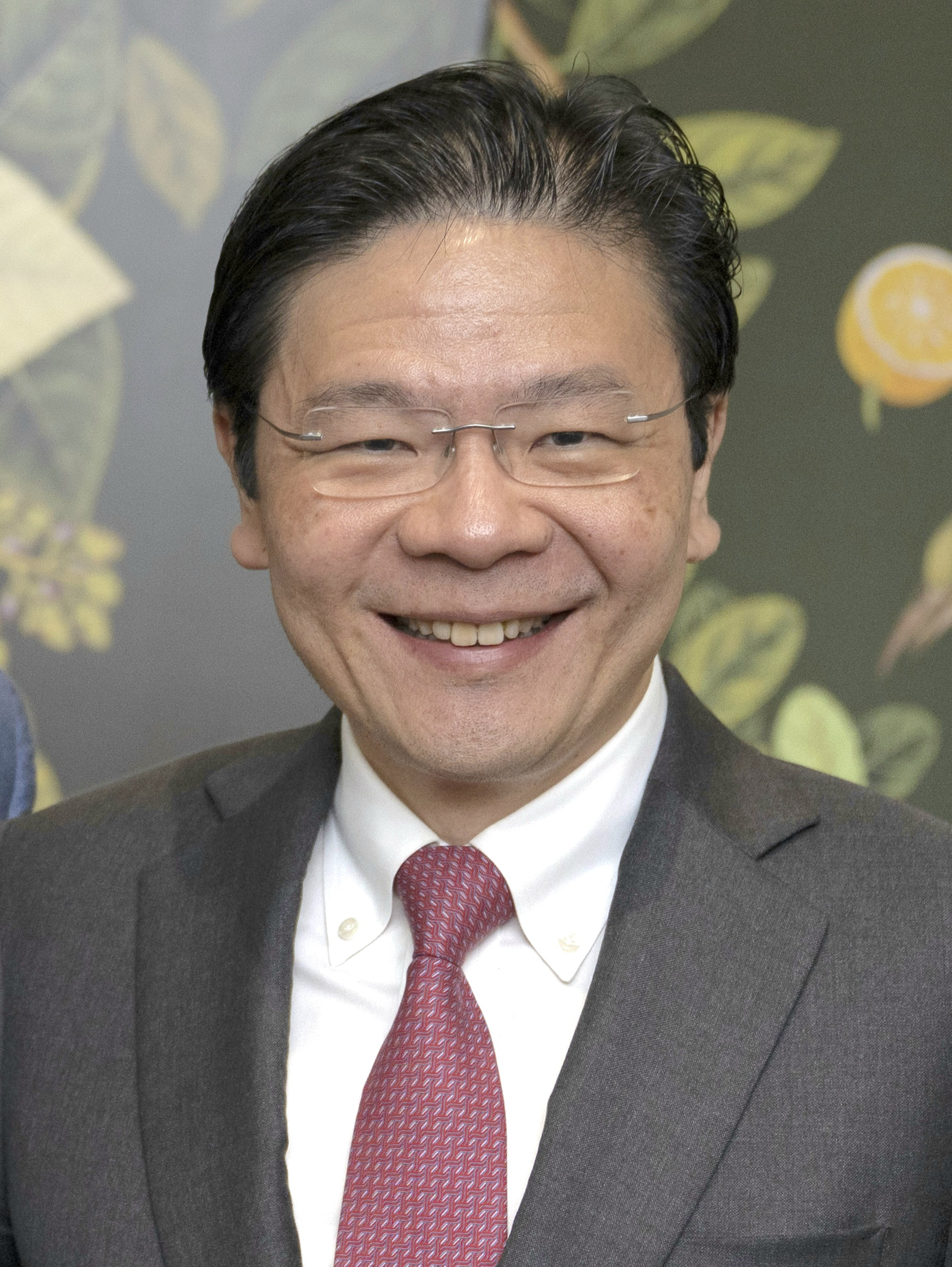
Singapore
Lawrence Wong, Prime Minister
guest invitee

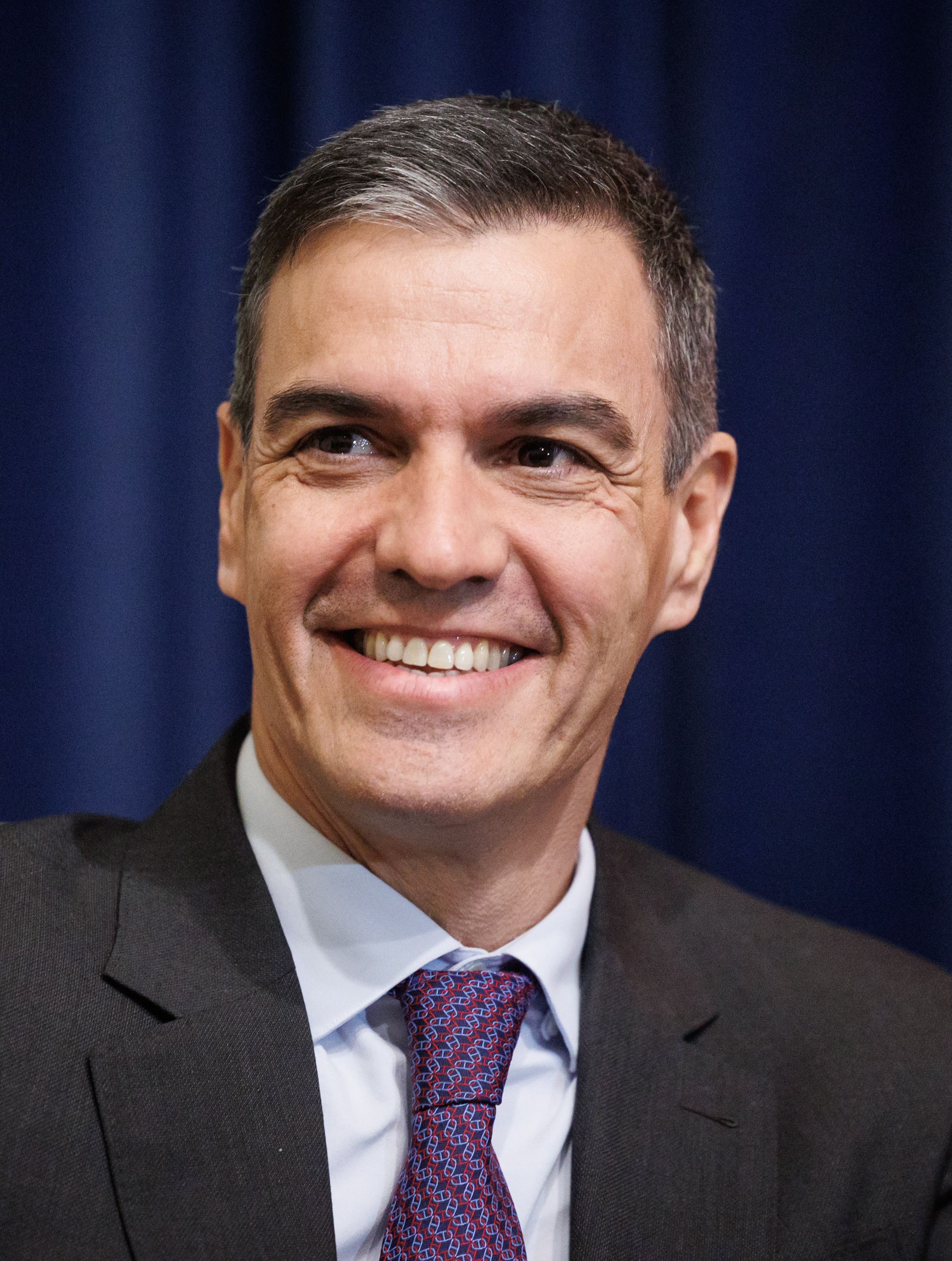
Spain
Pedro Sánchez, Prime Minister
Permanent guest invitee

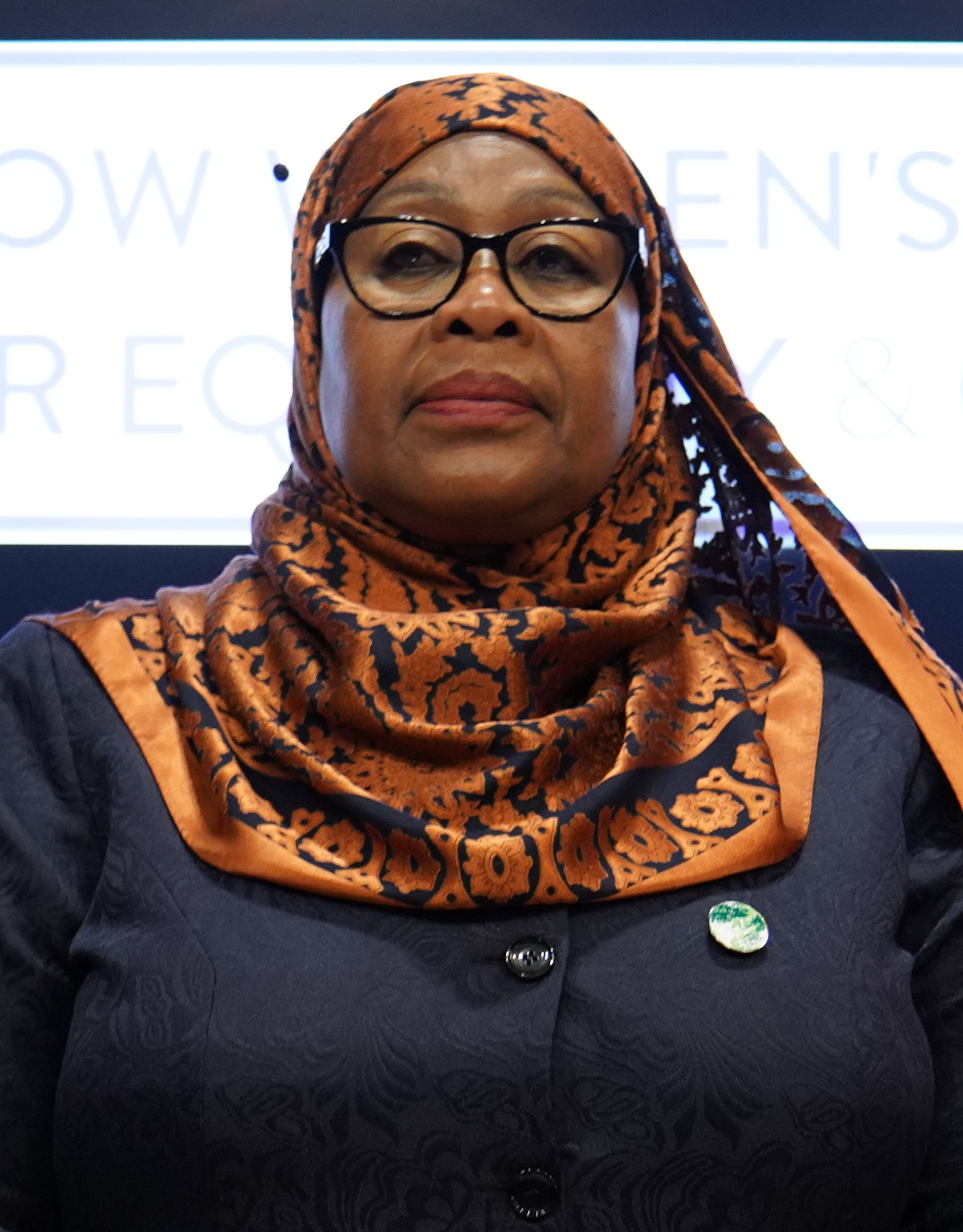
Tanzania
Samia Suluhu Hassan, President
guest invitee

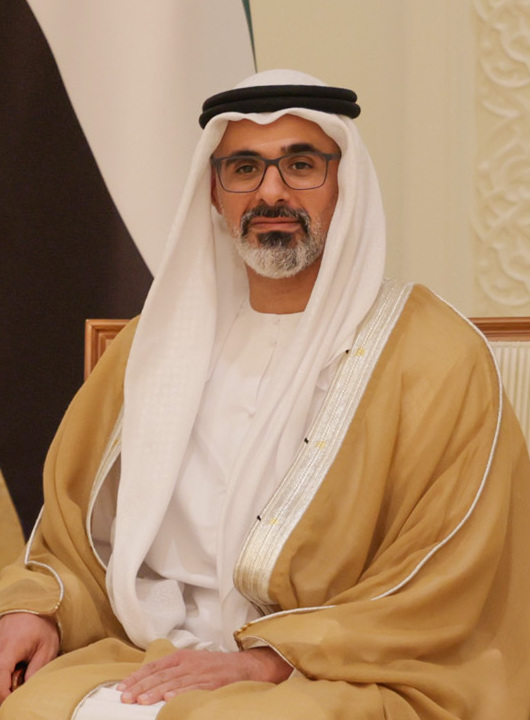
United Arab Emirates
Khaled bin Mohamed Al Nahyan, Crown Prince of Abu Dhabi
guest invitee

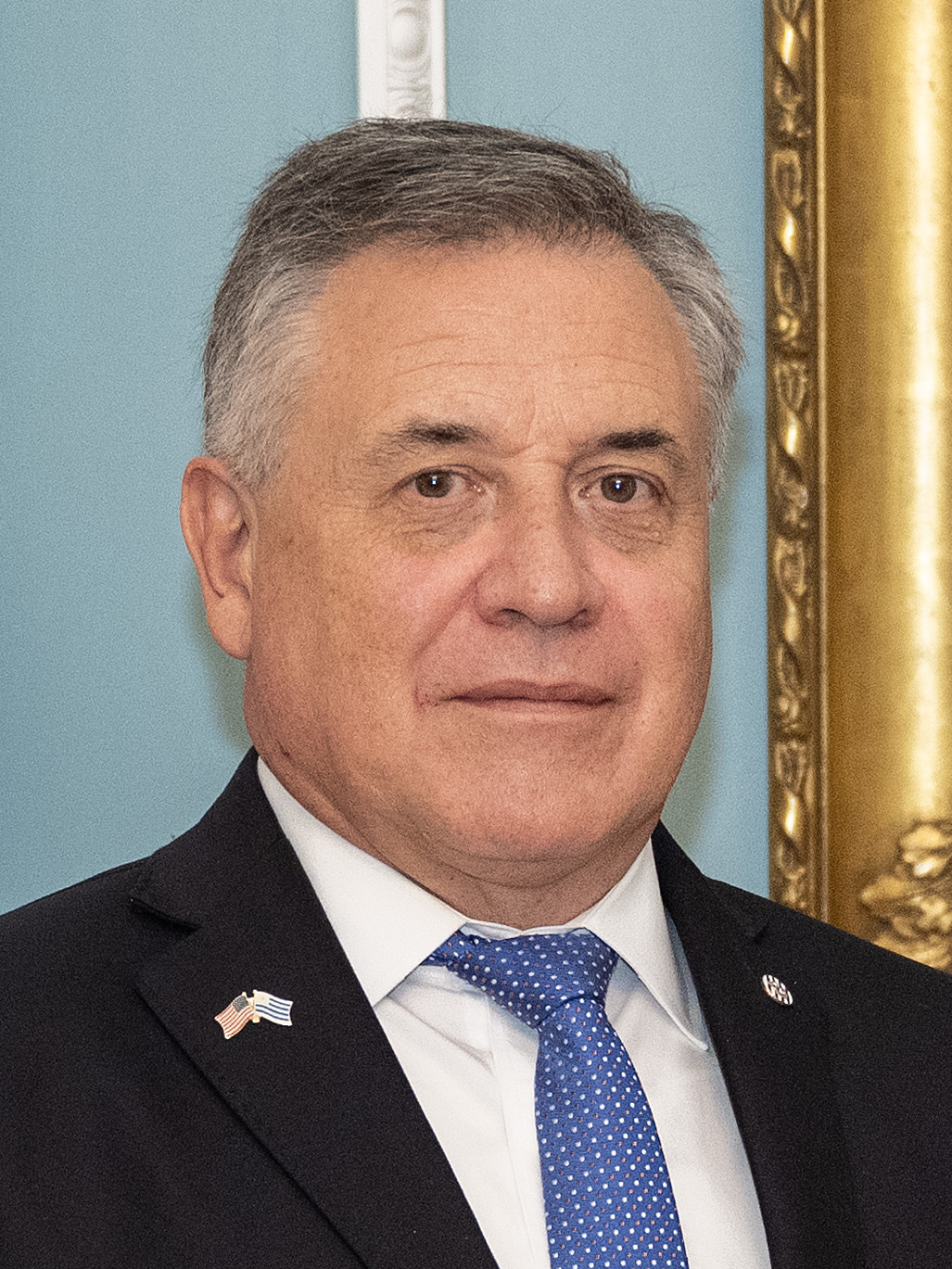
Uruguay
Omar Paganini, Foreign Minister
guest invitee

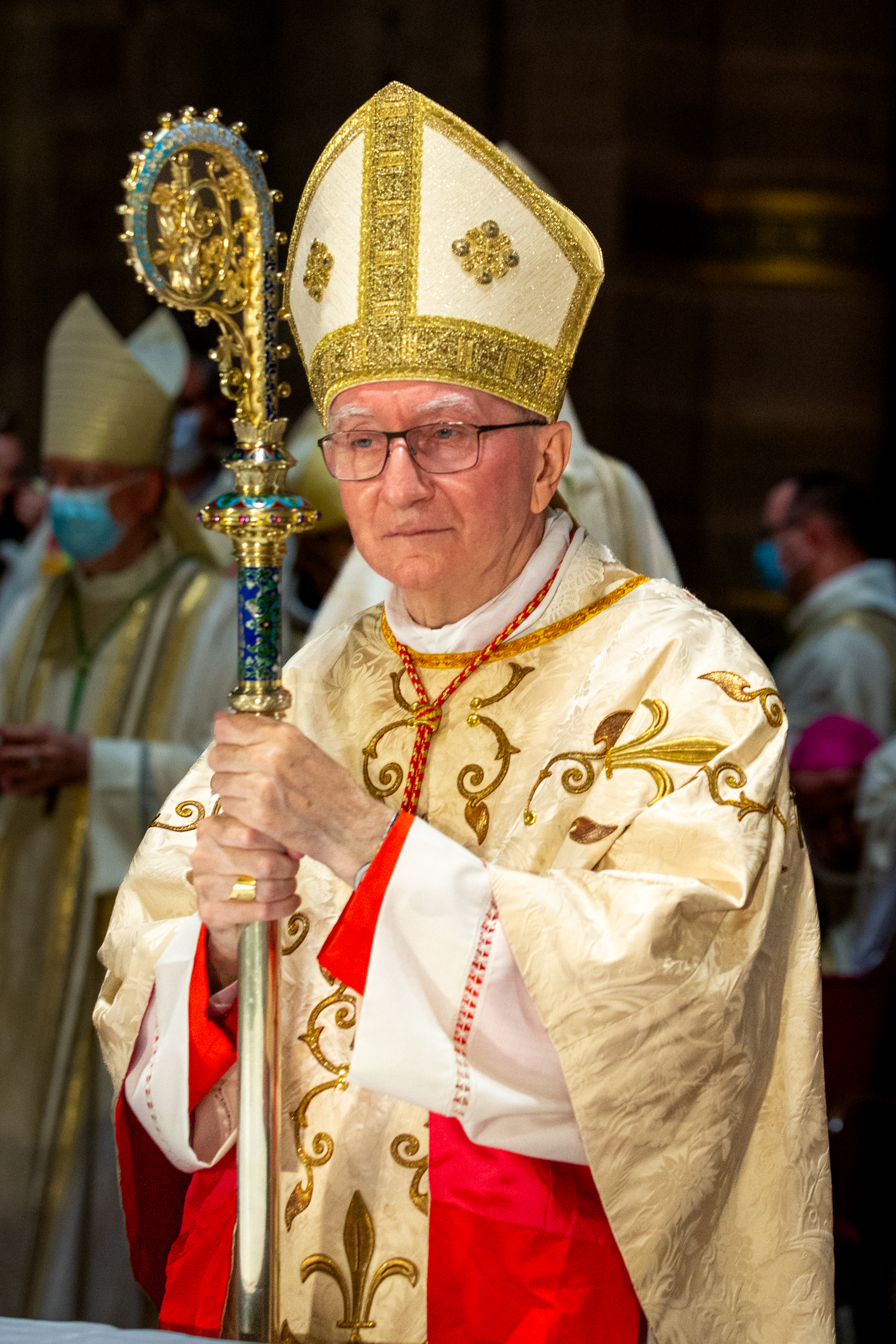
Vatican City
Pietro Parolin, Cardinal Secretary of State
guest invitee

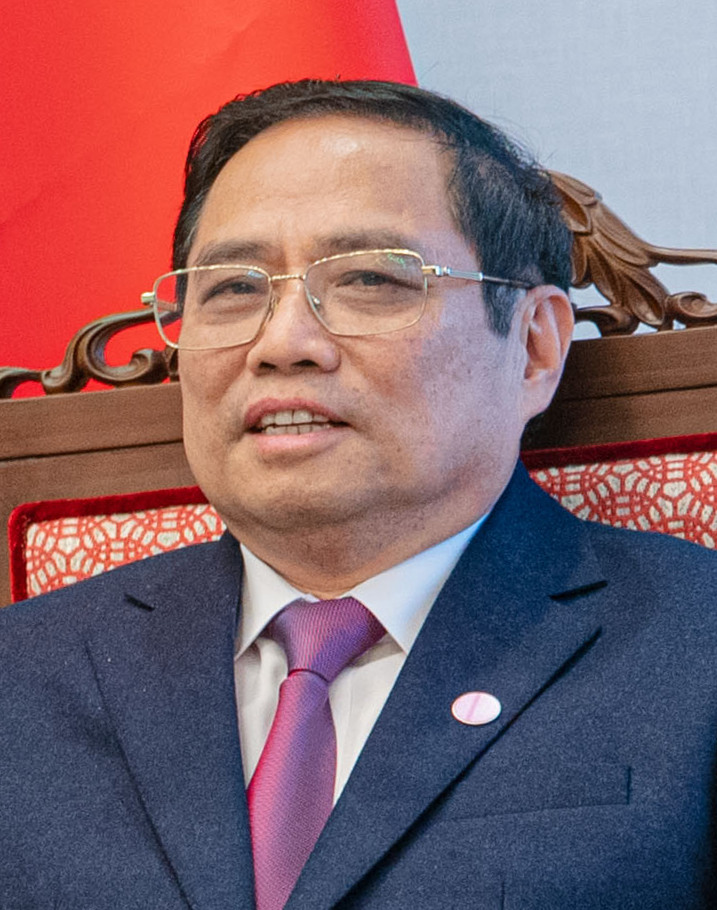
Vietnam
Phạm Minh Chính, Prime Minister
guest invitee

== Participating international organization guests ==
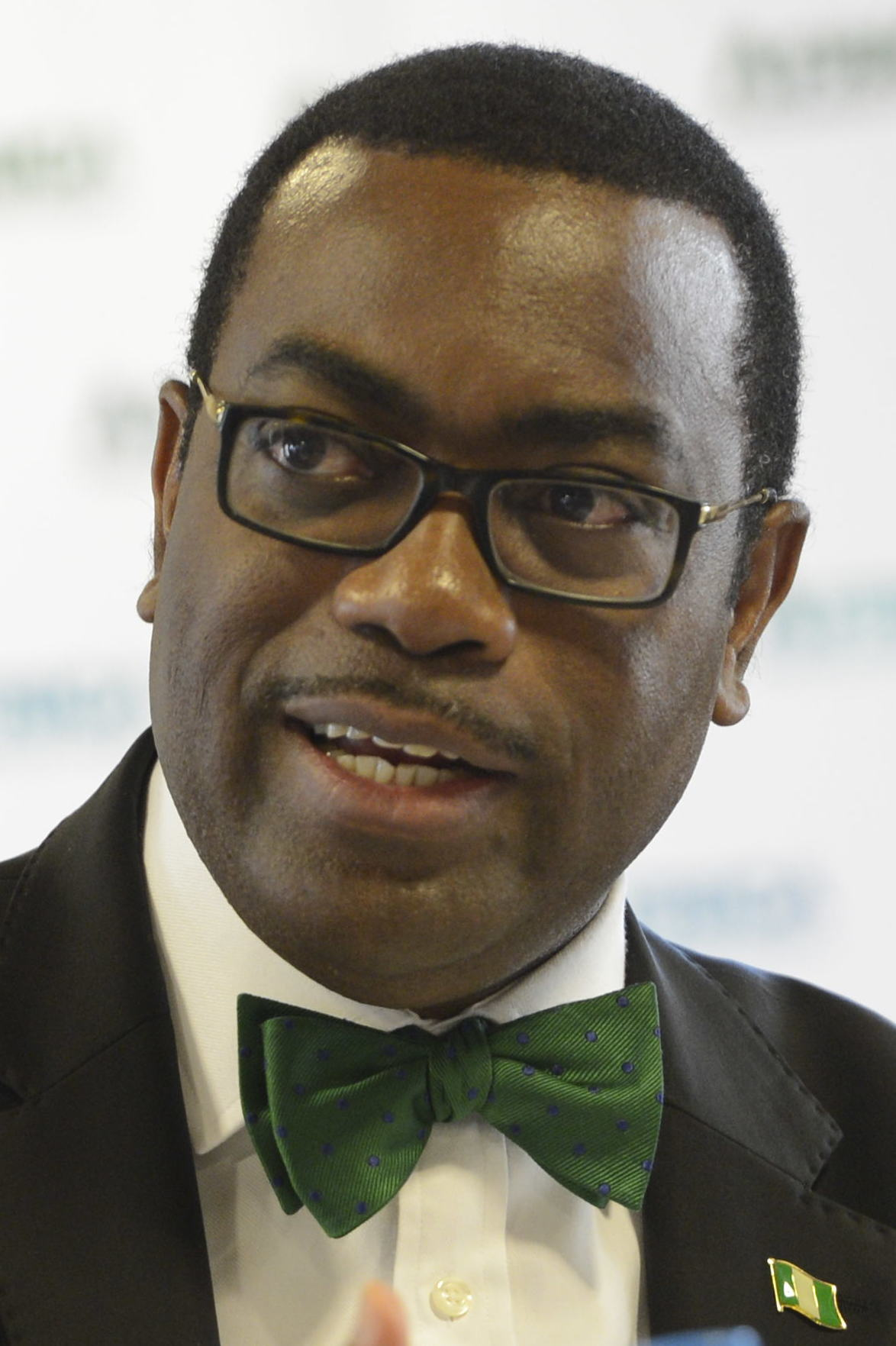
African Development Bank
Akinwumi Adesina, President

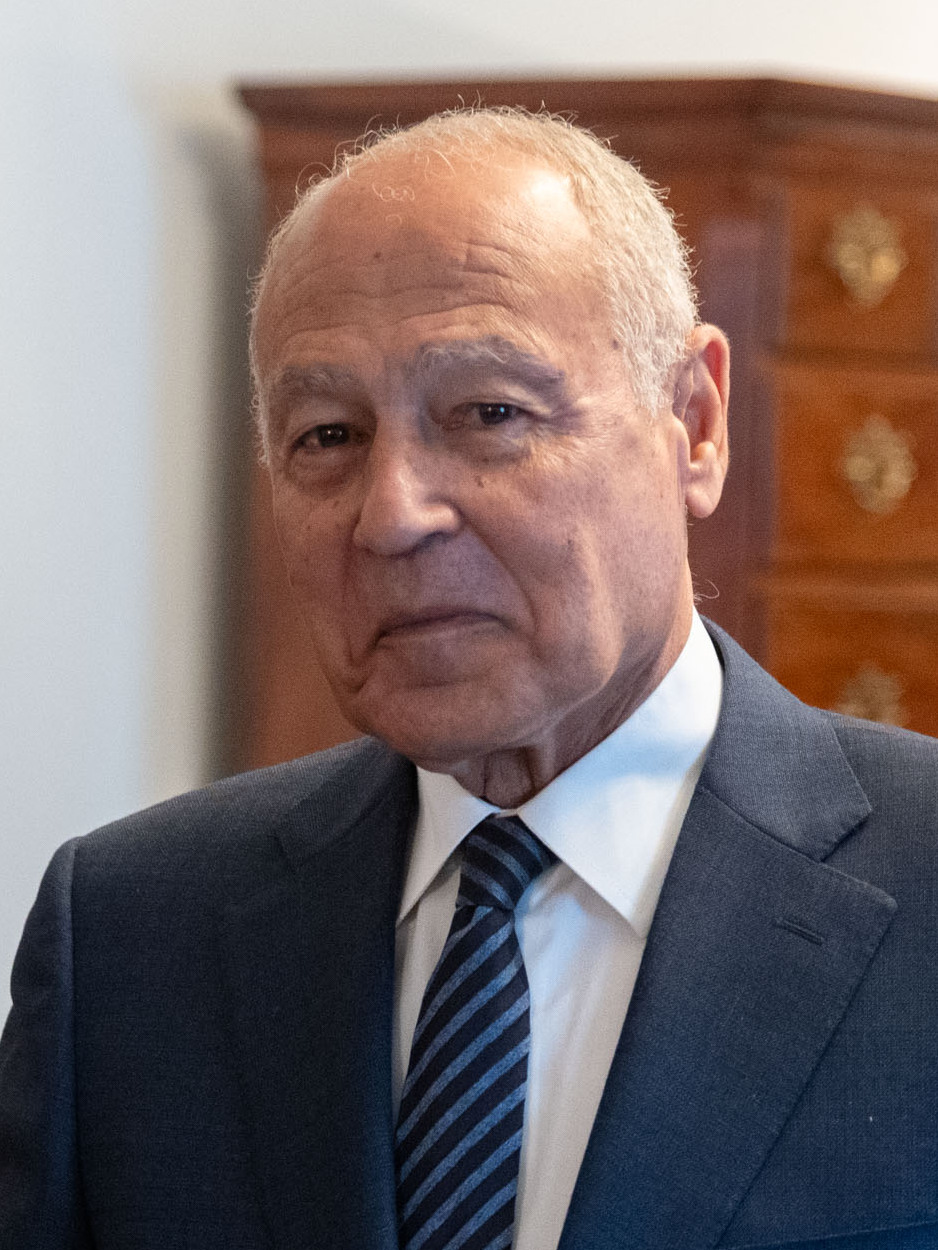
Arab League
Ahmed Aboul Gheit, Secretary-General

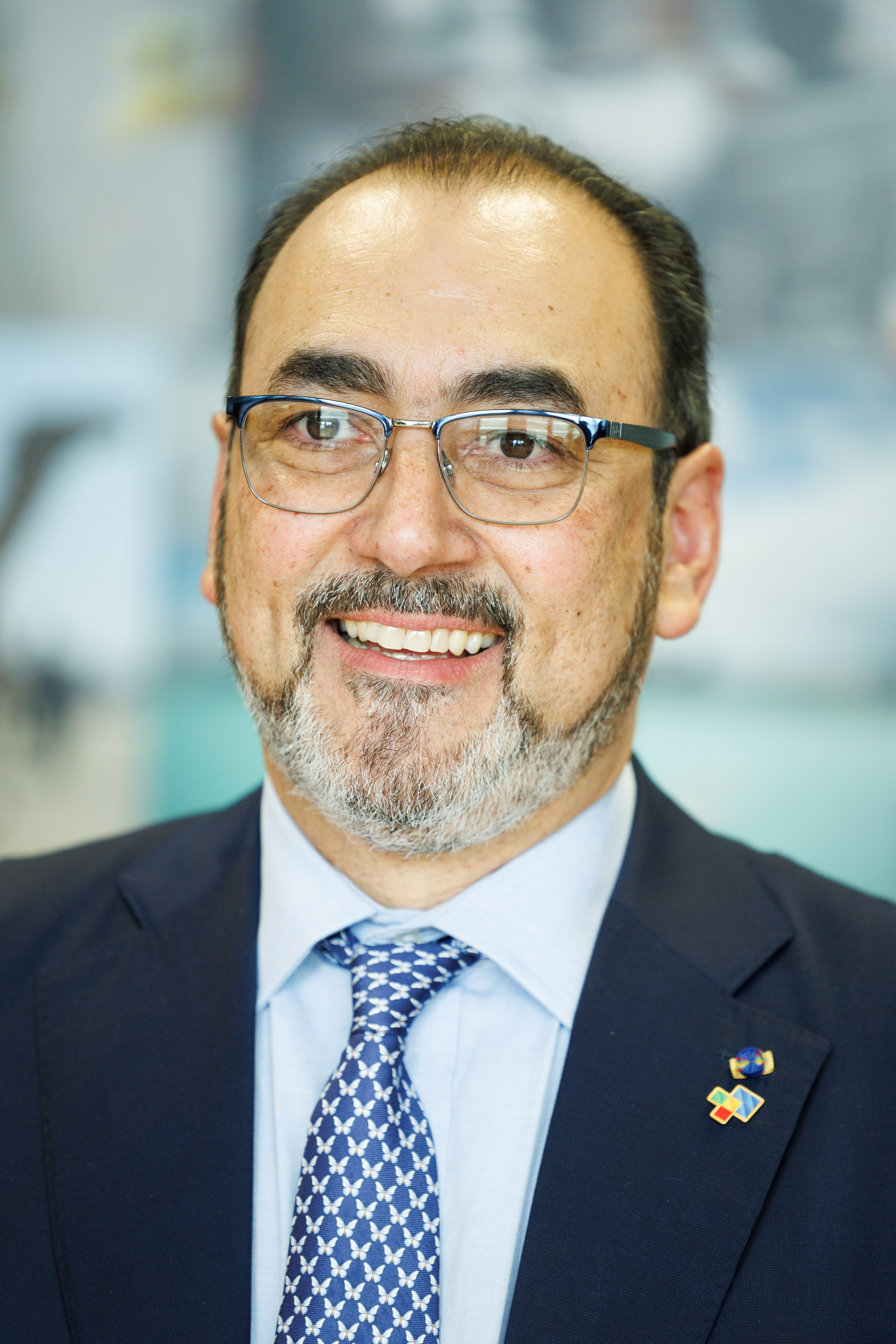
CAF – Development Bank of Latin America and the Caribbean
Sergio Díaz-Granados Guida, President

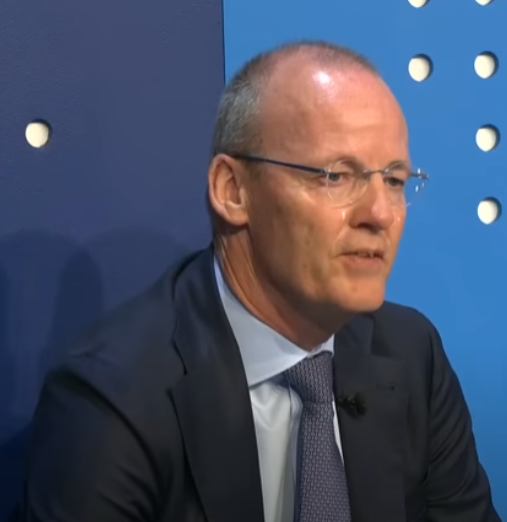
Financial Stability Board
Klaas Knot, Chair

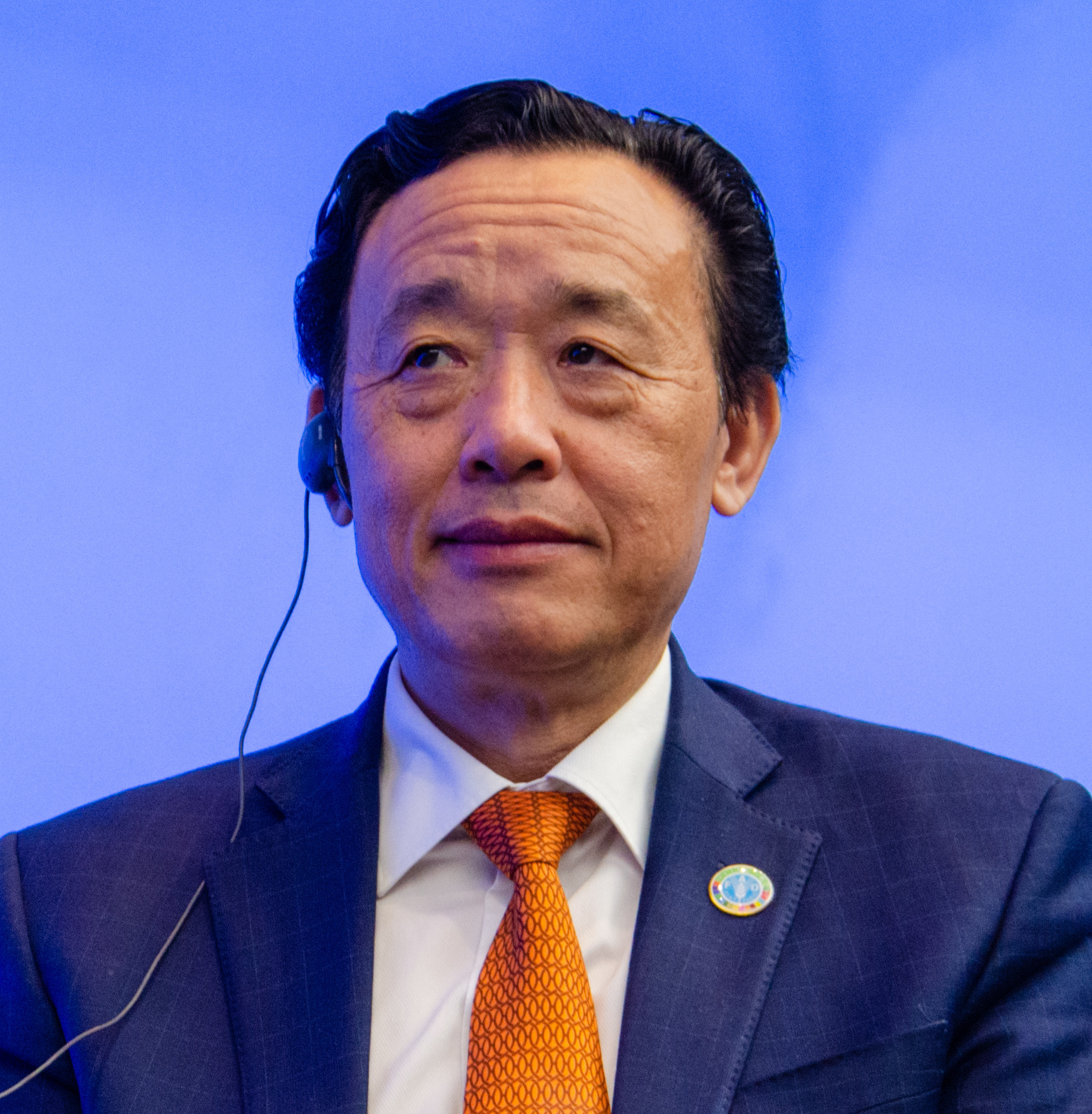
Food and Agriculture Organization of the United Nations
Qu Dongyu, Director-General

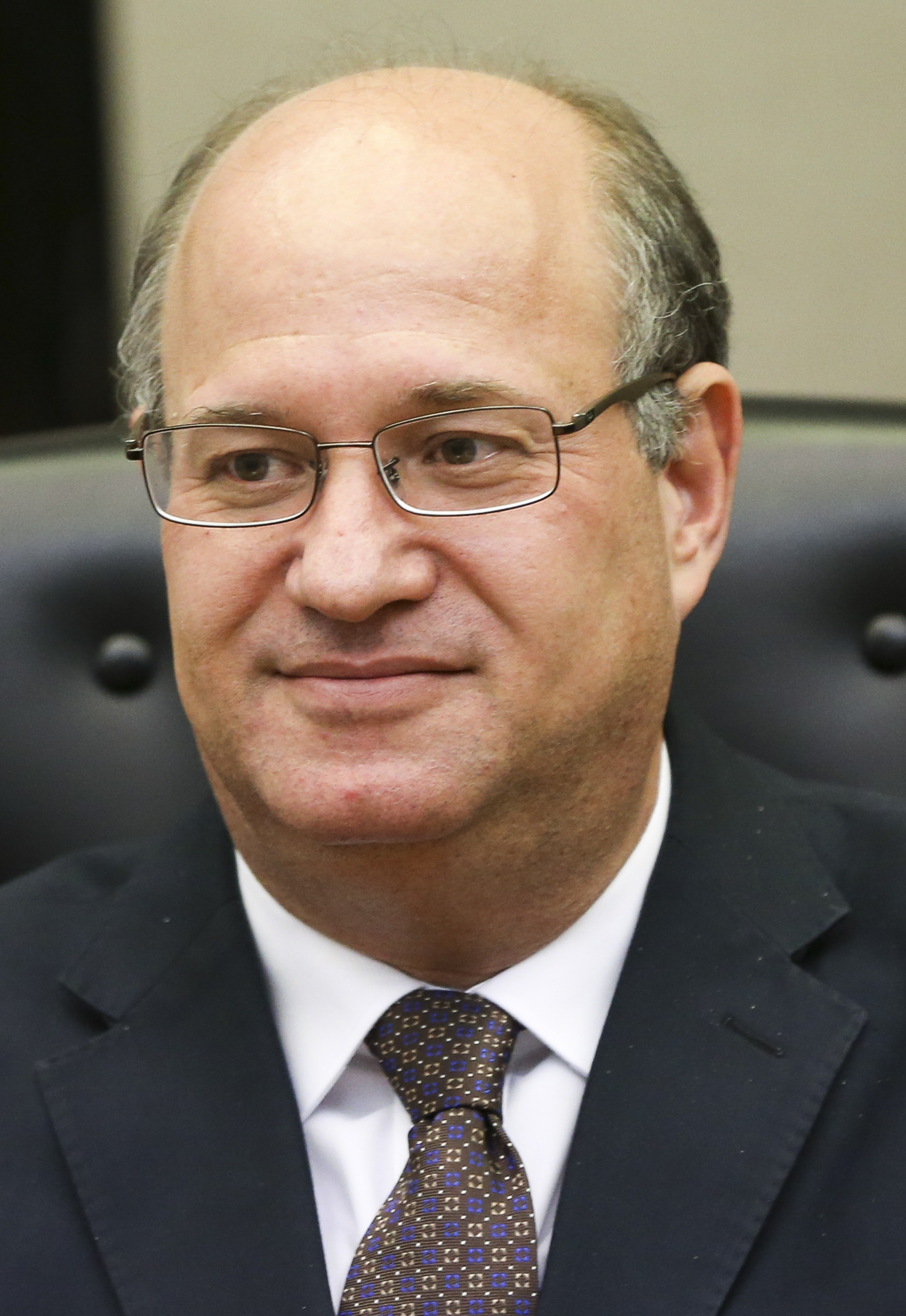
Inter-American Development Bank
Ilan Goldfajn, President

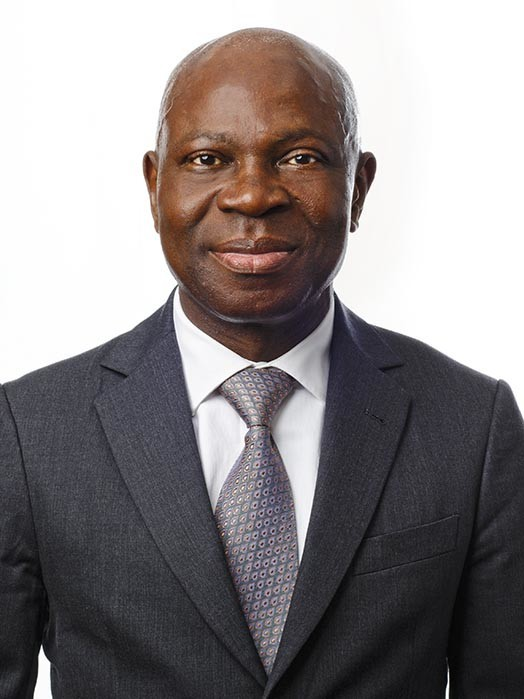
International Labour Organization
Gilbert Houngbo, Director-General

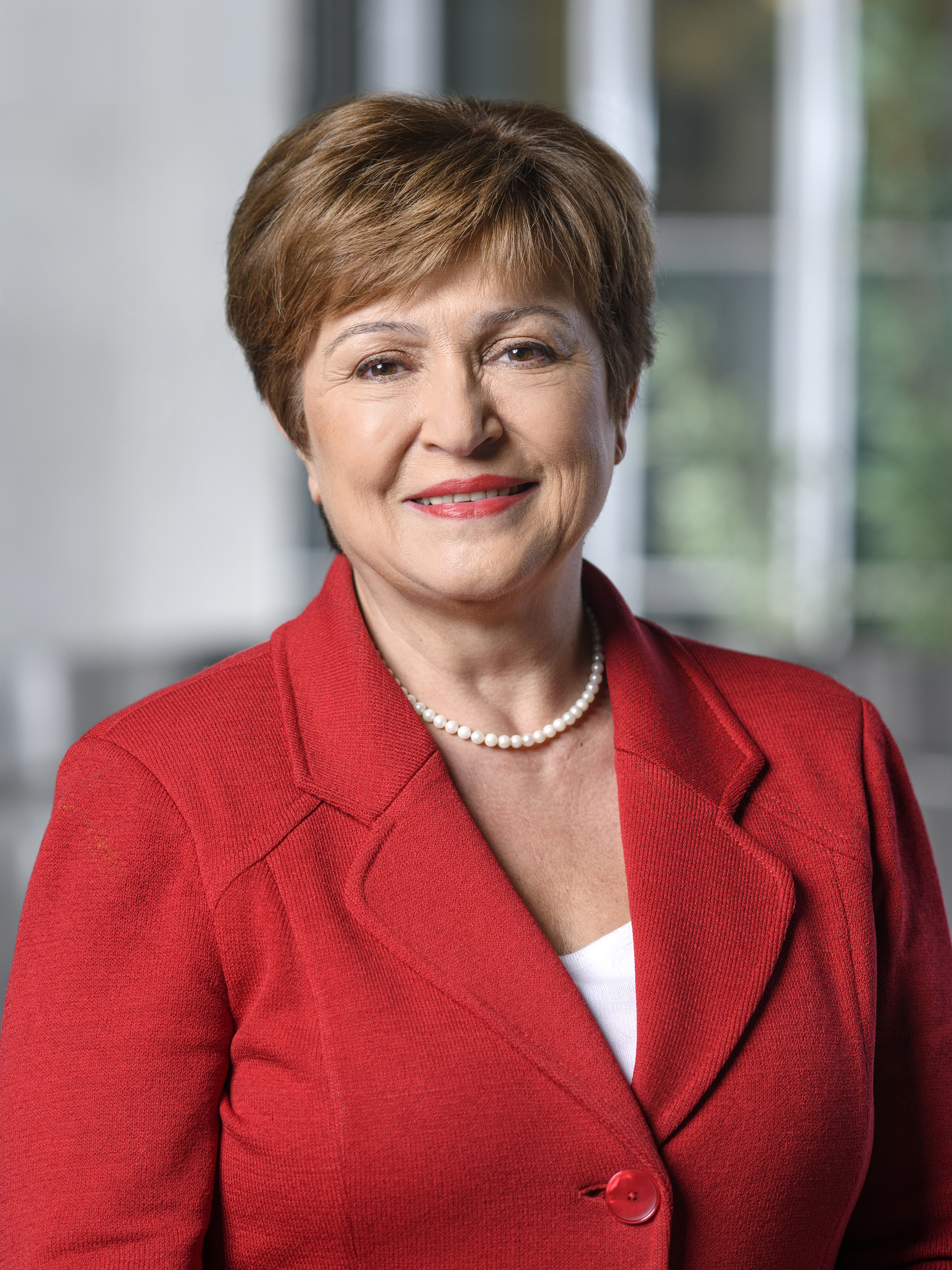
International Monetary Fund
Kristalina Georgieva, Managing Director

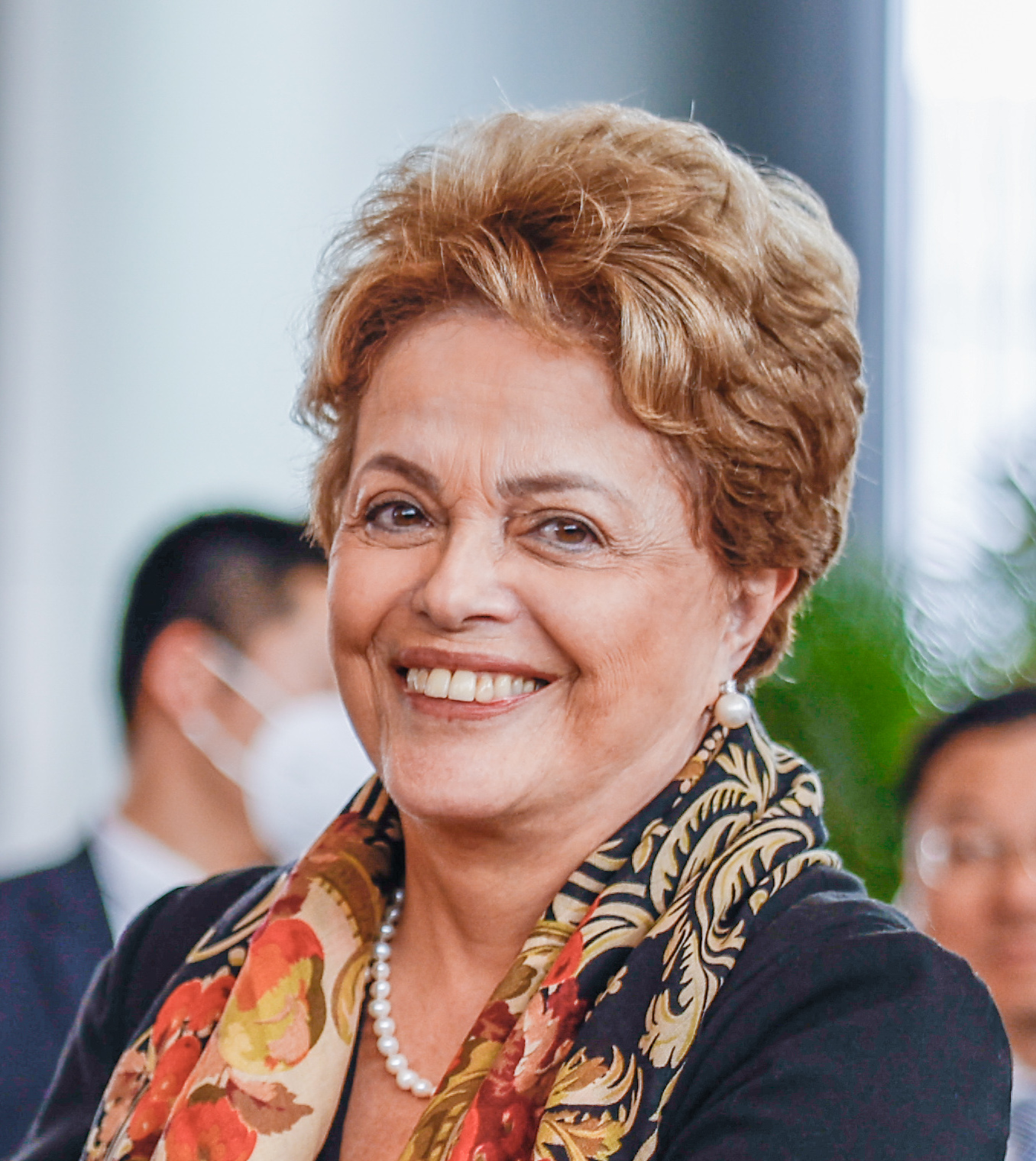
New Development Bank
Dilma Rousseff, President

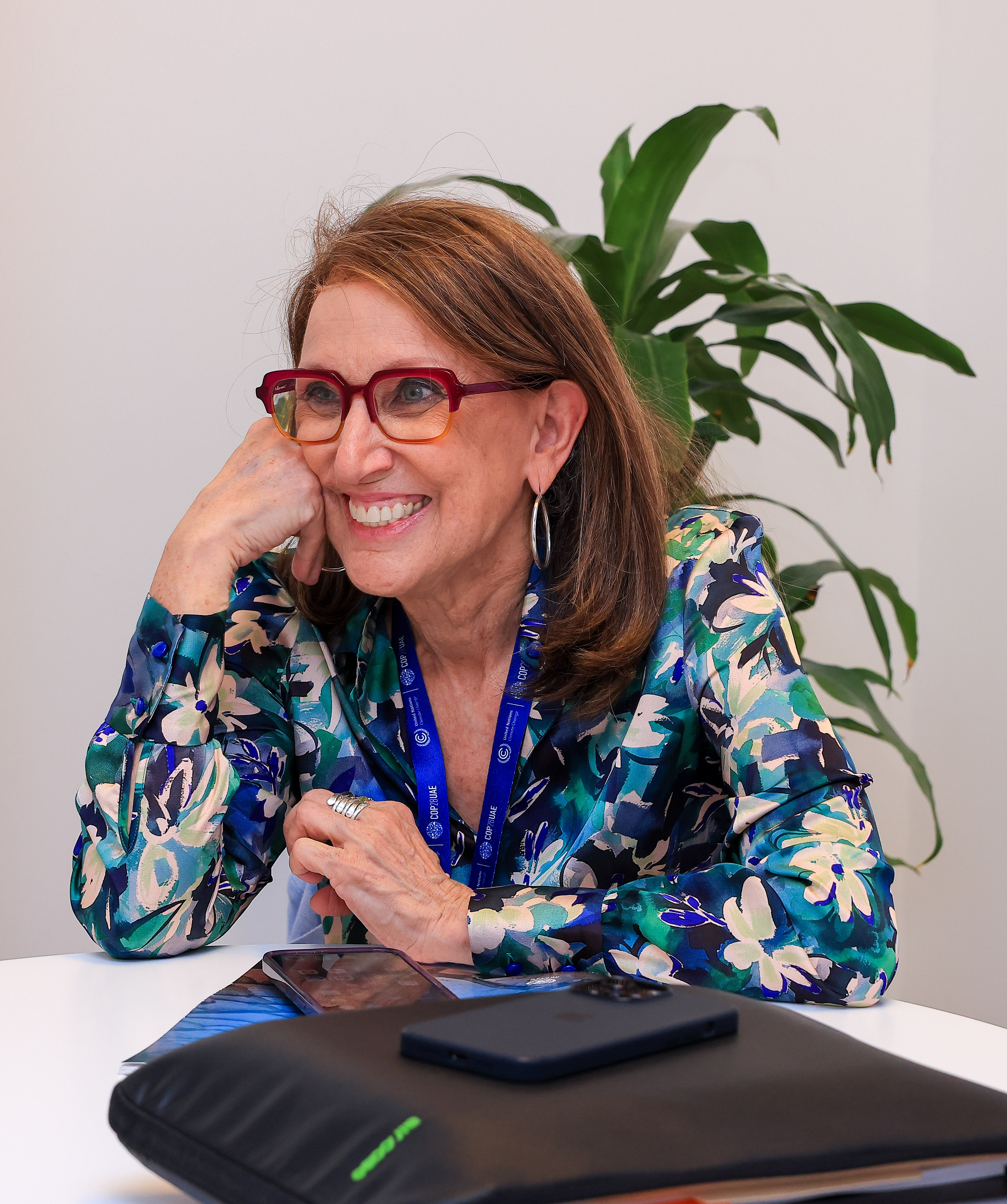
United Nations Conference on Trade and Development
Rebeca Grynspan, Secretary-General

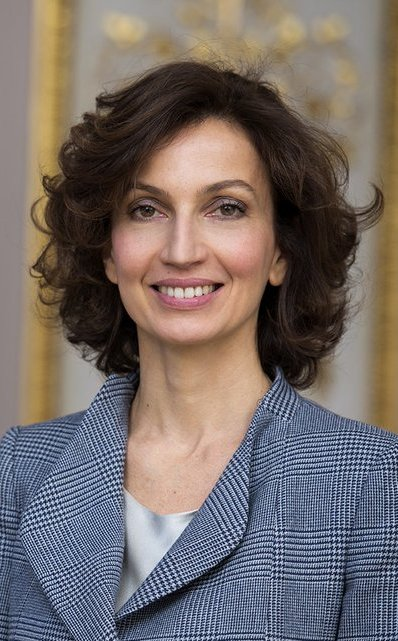
(UNESCO) United Nations Educational, Scientific and Cultural Organization
Audrey Azoulay, Director-General

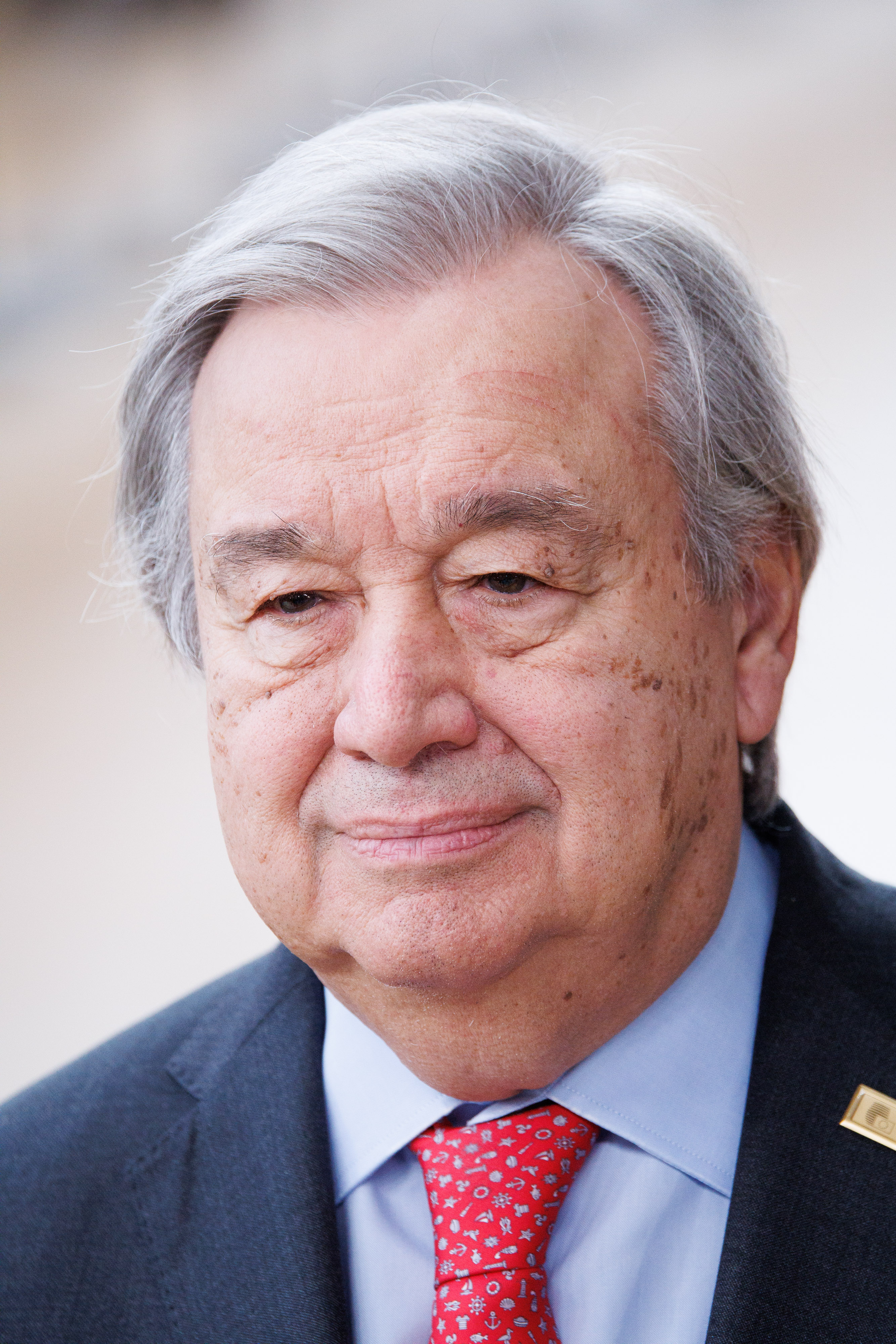
United Nations
António Guterres, Secretary-General

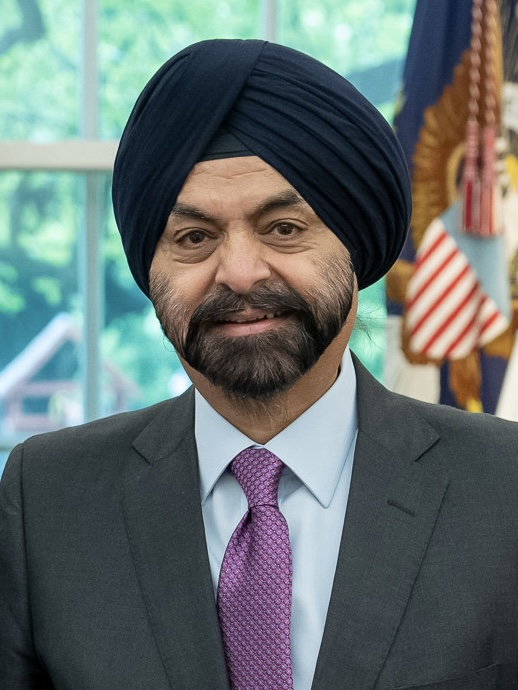
World Bank
Ajay Banga, President

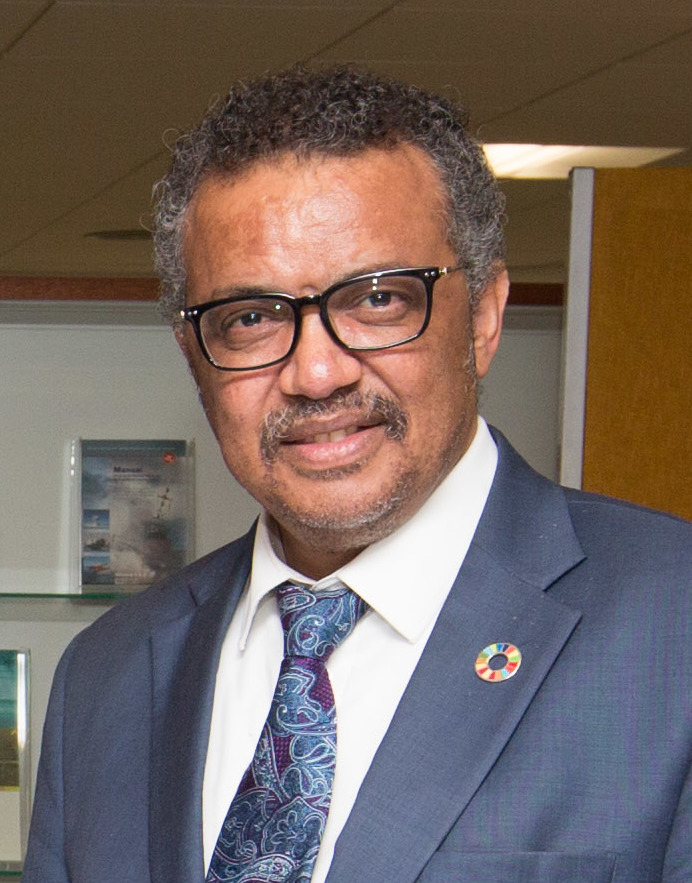
World Health Organization
Tedros Adhanom Ghebreyesus, Director-General

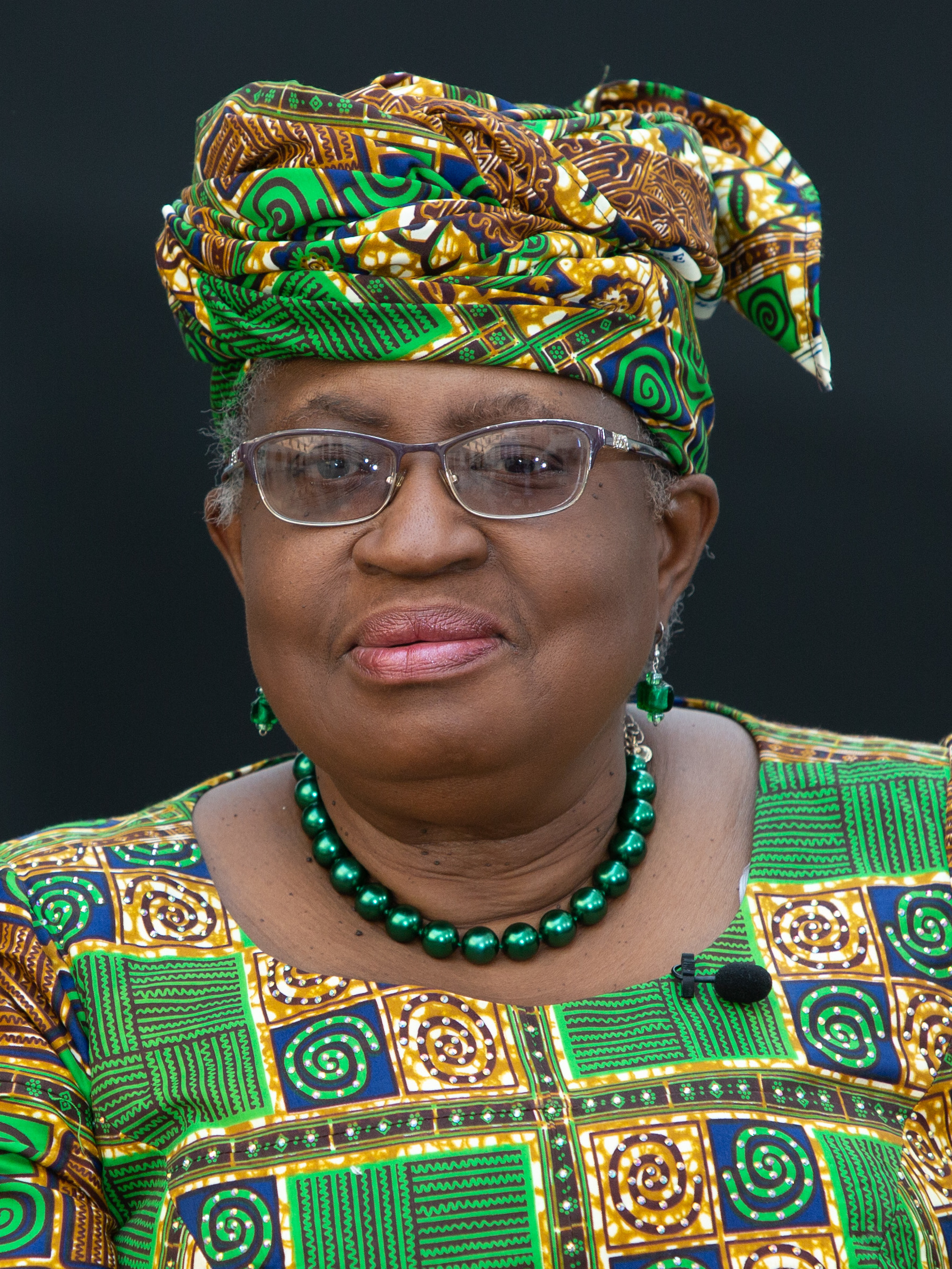
World Trade Organization
Ngozi Okonjo-Iweala, Director-General

== See also ==
- 50th G7 summit
- 16th BRICS summit
- 17th BRICS summit
- 2023 G20 New Delhi summit
- 2023 South American summit
- List of G20 summits
