= List of international presidential trips made by Kais Saied =

This is a list of international presidential trips made by Kais Saied, the current President of Tunisia.

== List ==
=== 2020 ===
Country	Areas visited	Date(s)	Notes
Algeria	Algiers	2 February	Working visit. Met with President Abdelmadjid Tebboune.
France	Paris	22–23 June	Met with President Emmanuel Macron.
Qatar	Doha	14–16 November	State visit. Met with Emir Tamim bin Hamad Al Thani.

=== 2021 ===
Country	Areas visited	Date(s)	Notes
Libya	Tripoli	17 March	Working visit. Met with Chairman of the Presidential Council Mohamed al-Menfi and Prime Minister Abdul Hamid Dbeibeh.
Egypt	Cairo	9–11 April	Working visit. Met with President Abdel Fattah el-Sisi.
France	Paris	17–18 May	Attended the Summit on the Financing of African Economies.
Italy	Rome	16–17 June	Official visit.

=== 2022 ===
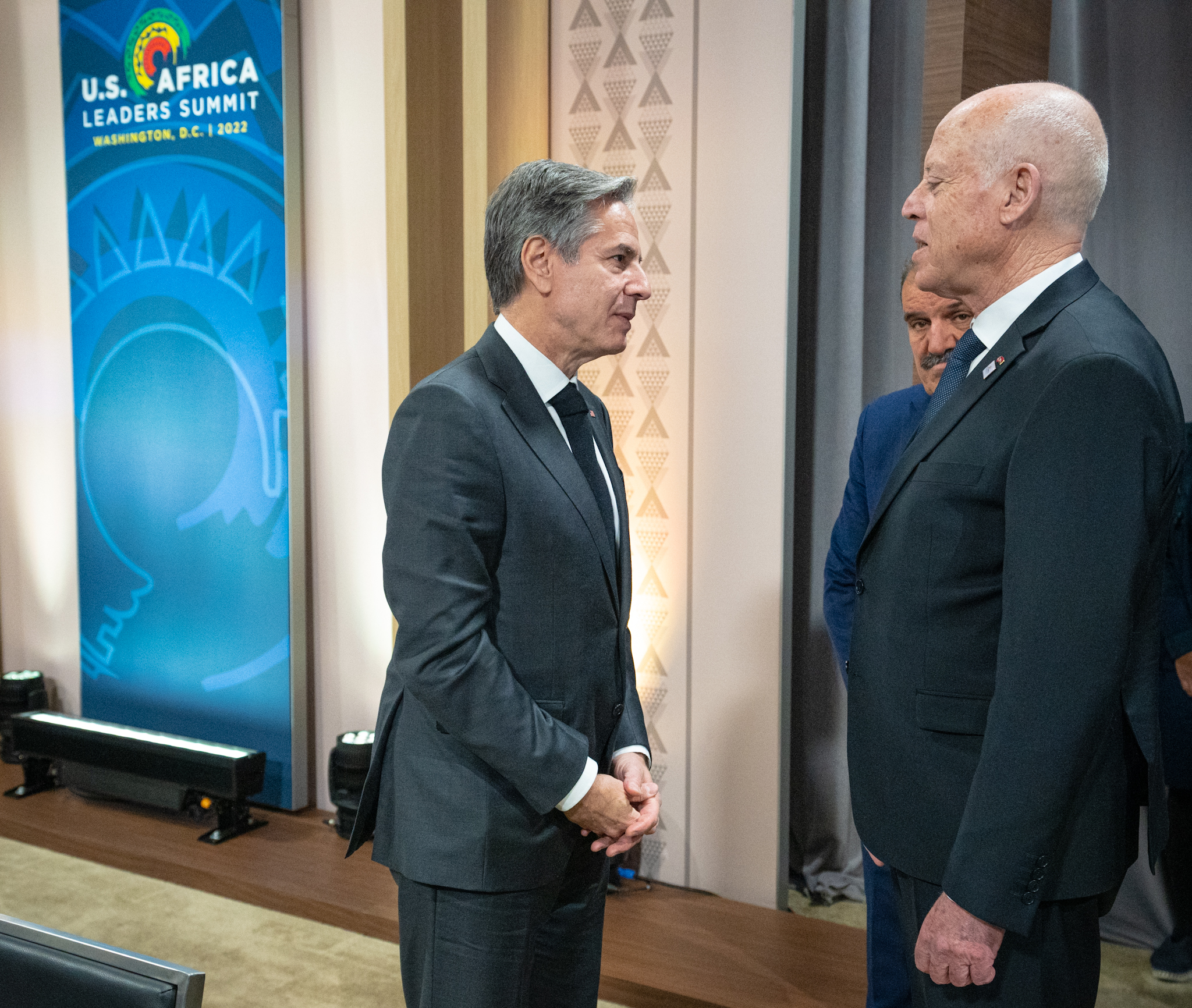
Saied with Secretary Antony Blinken in Washington, D.C., 22 December 2022

Country	Areas visited	Date(s)	Notes
Belgium	Brussels	17–18 February	Attended the 6th European Union–African Union Summit.
Algeria	Algiers	4–5 July	Working visit. Met with President Abdelmadjid Tebboune.
Algeria	Algiers	1–2 November	Attended the 31st Arab League summit.
Saudi Arabia	Riyadh and Medina	9–10 December	Attended the 2022 China-Arab States Summit. Visited the Prophet's Mosque.
United States	Washington, D.C.	13–15 December	Attended the United States–Africa Leaders Summit 2022. Met with Secretary of State Antony Blinken.

=== 2023 ===
Country	Areas visited	Date(s)	Notes
Saudi Arabia	Jeddah	19 May	Attended the 32nd Arab League summit. Met with Crown Prince of Saudi Arabia Mohammed bin Salman and Syrian President Bashar al-Assad.
France	Paris	22–23 June	Attended the Paris Summit for a New Global Financing Pact. Met with President Emmanuel Macron.

=== 2024 ===
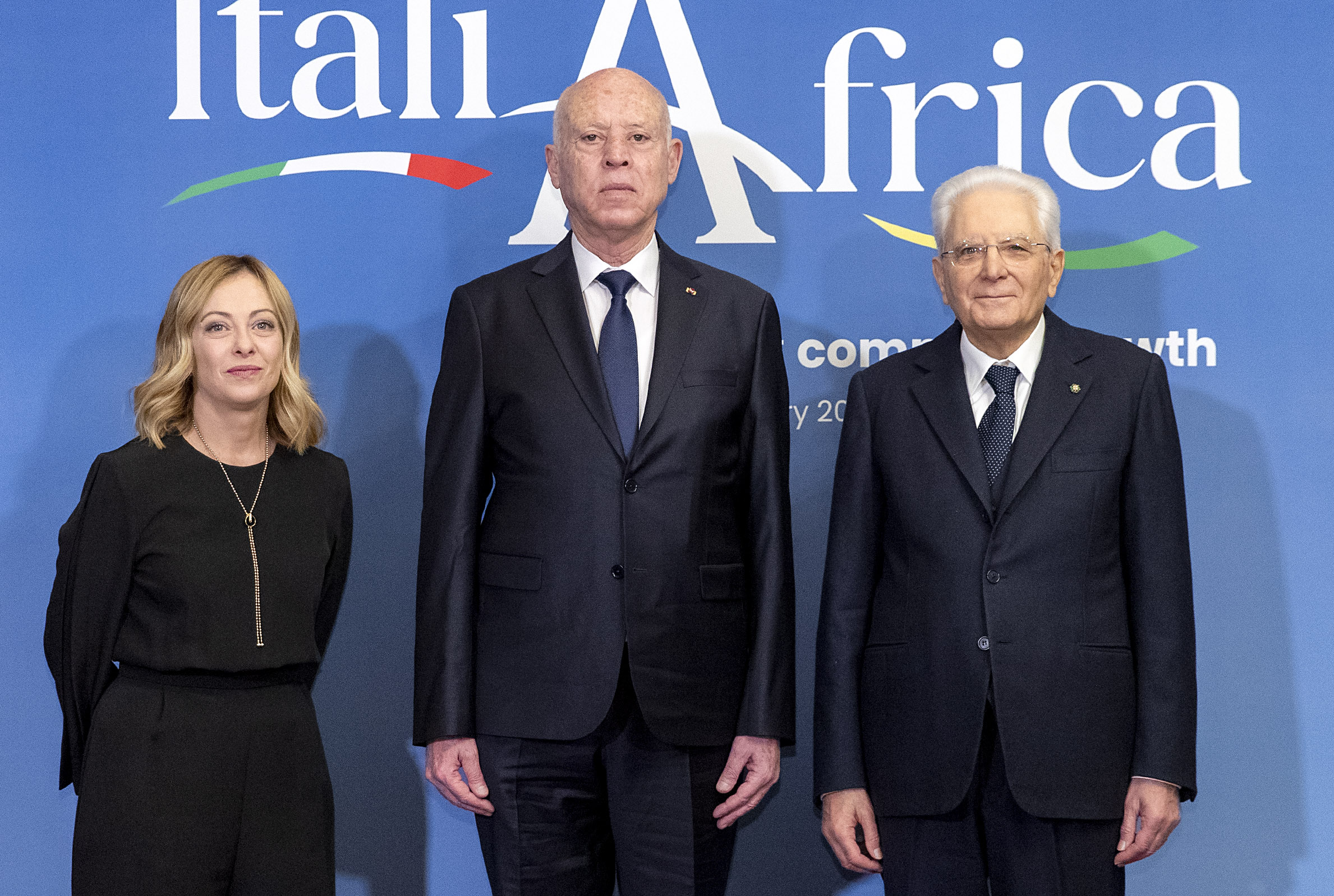
Kais Saied with Italian President Sergio Mattarella and Prime Minister Giorgia Meloni during the 2024 Italy–Africa Summit.

Country	Areas visited	Date(s)	Notes
Italy	Rome	28–29 January	Attended the 2024 Italy–Africa Summit. Met with Prime Minister Giorgia Meloni.
Algeria	Algiers	2 March	Attended the 7th GECF Summit.
Iran	Tehran	22 May	Attended the funeral of President Ebrahim Raisi. Met with Supreme Leader Ali Khamenei.
China	Beijing	28 May – 1 June	State visit. Attended the 10th opening ceremony of the China–Arab States Cooperation Forum. Met with General Secretary Xi Jinping and Premier Li Qiang.
Algeria	Algiers	1 November	Attended the 70th anniversary celebrations of the Algerian Revolution.

=== 2025 ===
Country	Areas visited	Date(s)	Notes
Algeria	Algiers	3–4 September	Attended the 4th Intra-African Trade Fair. Met with President Abdelmadjid Tebboune.
