= List of international presidential trips made by Mohamed al-Menfi =

Mohamed al-Menfi has made 57 public international trips to 23 countries as the Chairman of the Presidential Council of Libya since taking office on 15 March 2021.

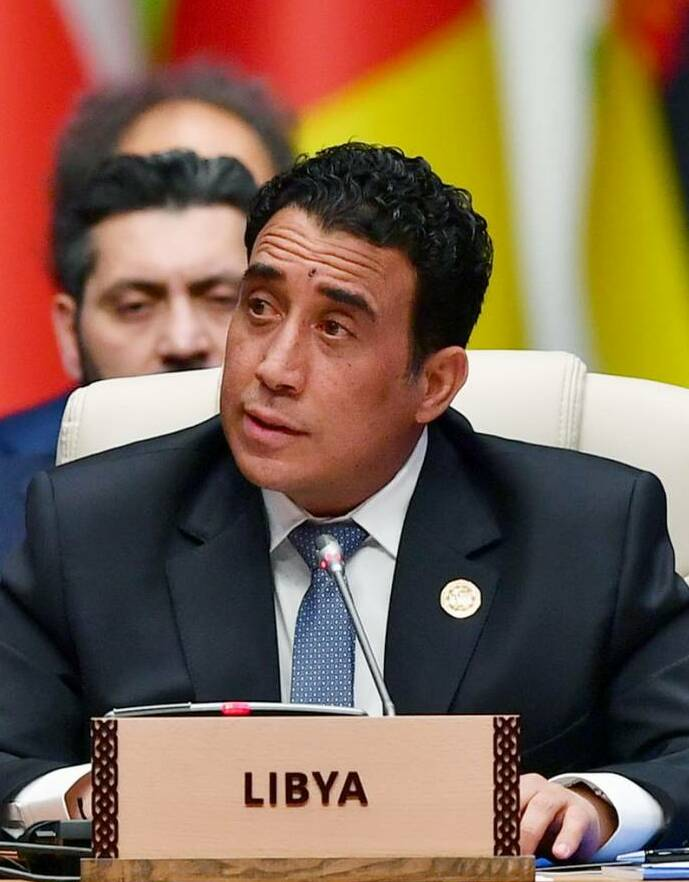
Mohamed al-Menfi in 2023

== Summary ==
The number of visits per country where Mohamed al-Menfi traveled are:

- One visit: Bahrain, China, the Republic of the Congo, Equatorial Guinea, Greece, Spain, Turkmenistan, Uganda and the United Arab Emirates.
- Two visits: Azerbaijan, France, Italy, Nigeria, Qatar, Russia and Turkey.
- Three visits: Tunisia.
- Four visits: Ethiopia, Kenya and Switzerland.
- Five visits: Algeria and Saudi Arabia.
- Six visits: the United States.
- Seven visits: Egypt.

== 2021 ==
	Country	Areas visited	Dates	Details
1	France	Paris	23–25 March	Met with President Emmanuel Macron.
1	Egypt	Cairo	25–26 March	Met with President Abdel Fattah el-Sisi.
1	Turkey	Istanbul	26–27 March	Met with President Recep Tayyip Erdoğan.
2	Greece	Athens	13–14 April	Met with Prime Minister Kyriakos Mitsotakis.
3	Nigeria	Abuja	24–27 May	Met with President Muhammadu Buhari and attended the Lake Chad Basin Commission extraordinary summit.
4	Tunisia	Tunis	29–31 May	Met with President Kais Saied.
5	United Arab Emirates	Abu Dhabi	5–6 June	Met with Sheikh Mohamed bin Zayed Al Nahyan.
6	Italy	Rome	22–23 June	Met with Prime Minister Mario Draghi.
7	Republic of the Congo	Brazzaville	26–28 July	Met with President Denis Sassou Nguesso.
7	Algeria	Algiers	28–29 July	Met with President Abdelmadjid Tebboune and Prime Minister Aymen Benabderrahmane.
8	Qatar	Doha	14–15 September	Met with Sheikh Tamim bin Hamad Al Thani.
9	United States	New York City	22–24 September	Addressed the 76th session of the United Nations General Assembly.
10	Saudi Arabia	Riyadh	25–26 October	Met with Crown Prince Mohammed bin Salman and attended the Middle East Green Initiative Summit.
11	Turkey	Istanbul	17–18 December	Attended the third Turkey–Africa Partnership Summit.

== 2022 ==
	Country	Areas visited	Dates	Details
12	Ethiopia	Addis Ababa	4–6 February	Attended the 35th African Union summit.
13	Tunisia	Tunis	26–27 August	Met with President Kais Saied.
14	United States	New York City	20–22 September	Addressed the 77th session of the United Nations General Assembly.
15	Algeria	Algiers	11–12 October	Met with President Abdelmadjid Tebboune and Prime Minister Aymen Benabderrahmane.
16	Algeria	Algiers	31 October–3 November	Met with President Abdelmadjid Tebboune and attended the 31st Arab League summit.
17	Nigeria	Abuja	28–29 November	Attended the Lake Chad Basin Commission summit.
18	Saudi Arabia	Riyadh	8–10 December	Met with Crown Prince Mohammed bin Salman and attended the China–Arab States Summit.
19	United States	Washington D.C.	13–15 December	Met with President Joe Biden and First Lady Jill Biden and attended the United States–Africa Leaders Summit.

== 2023 ==
al-Menfi accompanied by Prime Minister Abdul Hamid Dbeibeh with Italian Prime Minister Giorgia Meloni and other leaders during the International Conference on Development and Migration in Rome, Italy – 23 July 2023

	Country	Areas visited	Dates	Details
20	Egypt	Cairo	15–17 January	Met with President Abdel Fattah el-Sisi.
21	Azerbaijan	Baku	2–3 March	Met with President Ilham Aliyev and attended the Non-Aligned Movement Contact Group Summit and held a bilateral meeting with the Bosnian Chairwoman of the Presidency Željka Cvijanović
22	Saudi Arabia	Jeddah	19 May	Met with Crown Prince Mohammed bin Salman and attended the 32nd Arab League Summit.
23	Kenya	Nairobi	15–17 July	Met with President William Ruto and attended the 5th African Union Mid-year Coordination Summit.
24	Italy	Rome	23–24 July	Met with Prime Minister Giorgia Meloni and attended the International Conference on Development and Migration.
25	Russia	Saint Petersburg	27–28 July	Met with President Vladimir Putin and attended the Russia–Africa Summit.
26	Kenya	Nairobi	4–6 September	Attended the Africa Climate Summit.
27	Egypt	Cairo	20–21 October	Met with President Abdel Fattah el-Sisi and attended the Gaza Peace Summit.
28	Saudi Arabia	Riyadh	8–11 November	Met with Crown Prince Mohammed bin Salman, attended the Saudi–African Summit and the Arab–Islamic Extraordinary Summit.

== 2024 ==
	Country	Areas visited	Dates	Details
29	Uganda	Kampala	19–21 January	Met with President Yoweri Museveni and attended the 19th Summit of the Non-Aligned Movement.
30	Egypt	Cairo	1–2 February	Met with President Abdel Fattah el-Sisi.
31	Ethiopia	Addis Ababa	14–18 February	Met with Prime Minister Abiy Ahmed, attended the 37th African Union Summit and held a bilateral meeting with Brazilian President Luiz Inácio Lula da Silva.
32	Bahrain	Manama	15–16 May	Met with King Hamad bin Isa Al Khalifa and attended the 33rd Arab League summit.
33	Kenya	Nairobi	27–31 May	Met with President William Ruto and attended the 59th summit of the African Development Bank and the 50th summit of the African Development Fund.
34	Switzerland	Zurich	15–16 June	Attended a high-level summit on Peace in Ukraine
35	China	Beijing	3–4 September	Met with President Xi Jinping and Premier Li Qiang and attended the Forum on China–Africa Cooperation.
36	United States	New York City	24–26 September	Addressed the 79th session of the United Nations General Assembly.
37	Algeria	Algiers	1–3 November	Met with President Abdelmadjid Tebboune.
38	Saudi Arabia	Riyadh	10–11 November	Met with Crown Prince Mohammed bin Salman and attended the Arab–Islamic extraordinary summit.
38	Azerbaijan	Baku	11–12 November	Met with President Ilham Aliyev and attended the 29th United Nations Climate Change Conference.

== 2025 ==
	Country	Areas visited	Dates	Details
39	Switzerland	Zurich and Davos	20–24 January	Attended the 55th annual meeting of the World Economic Forum and held a bilateral meeting with South African President Cyril Ramaphosa.
40	Ethiopia	Addis Ababa	16–18 February	Met with Prime Minister Abiy Ahmed and attended the 38th African Union summit.
41	Egypt	Cairo	4 March	Met with President Abdel Fattah el-Sisi and attended the Arab League extraordinary summit.
42	Spain	Seville	30 June–1 July	Met with King Felipe VI, Prime Minister Pedro Sánchez and UN Secretary-General António Guterres and attended the 4th International Conference on Financing for Development.
43	Equatorial Guinea	Malabo	13–27 July	Met with President Teodoro Obiang Nguema Mbasogo, attended the 7th African Union mid-year coordination summit and held a bilateral meeting with Egyptian President Abdel Fattah el-Sisi.
44	Turkmenistan	Ashgabat	5–6 August	Met with President Serdar Berdimuhamedow.
45	Tunisia	Tunis	18–19 August	Met with President Kais Saied.
46	Algeria	Algiers	4–6 September	Met with President Abdelmadjid Tebboune and attended the 4th Intra-African Trade Fair.
47	Qatar	Doha	14–15 September	Met with Sheikh Tamim bin Hamad Al Thani and attended the Arab–Islamic extraordinary summit.
48	United States	New York City	24–28 September	Met with President Donald Trump and First Lady Melania Trump and addressed the 80th session of the United Nations General Assembly and held a bilateral meeting with Turkish President Recep Tayyip Erdoğan.
49	France	Paris	28–29 October	Met with President Emmanuel Macron.
50	Egypt	Giza	1 November	Met with President Abdel Fattah el-Sisi and attended the inauguration ceremony of the Grand Egyptian Museum.

== 2026 ==
	Country	Areas visited	Dates	Details
51	Switzerland	Zurich and Davos	19–23 January	Attended the 56th annual meeting of the World Economic Forum.
52	Ethiopia	Addis Ababa	13–15 February	Met with Prime Minister Abiy Ahmed and attended the 39th African Union Summit.
53	Kenya	Nairobi	11–13 May	Met with President William Ruto, attended the Africa Forward Summit and held a bilateral meeting with French President Emmanuel Macron.
54	Switzerland	Geneva	5–7 July	Met with UN Secretary-General António Guterres and attended the Global Dialogue on AI Governance.
55	United States	New York City	21–27 September	Addressed the 81st session of the United Nations General assembly and held a bilateral meeting with Turkish President Recep Tayyip Erdoğan.
56	Egypt	New Alamein	2–4 October	Met with President Abdel Fattah el-Sisi and Foreign Minister Badr Abdelatty and attended the First African Business Forum and the African Continental Free Trade Area meeting.
57	Russia	Moscow	26–29 October	Met with President Vladimir Putin, attended the 8th heads of state and government summit of the Gas Exporting Countries Forum and the 3rd Russia–Africa Summit.
