= List of international presidential trips made by Abdel Fattah el-Sisi =

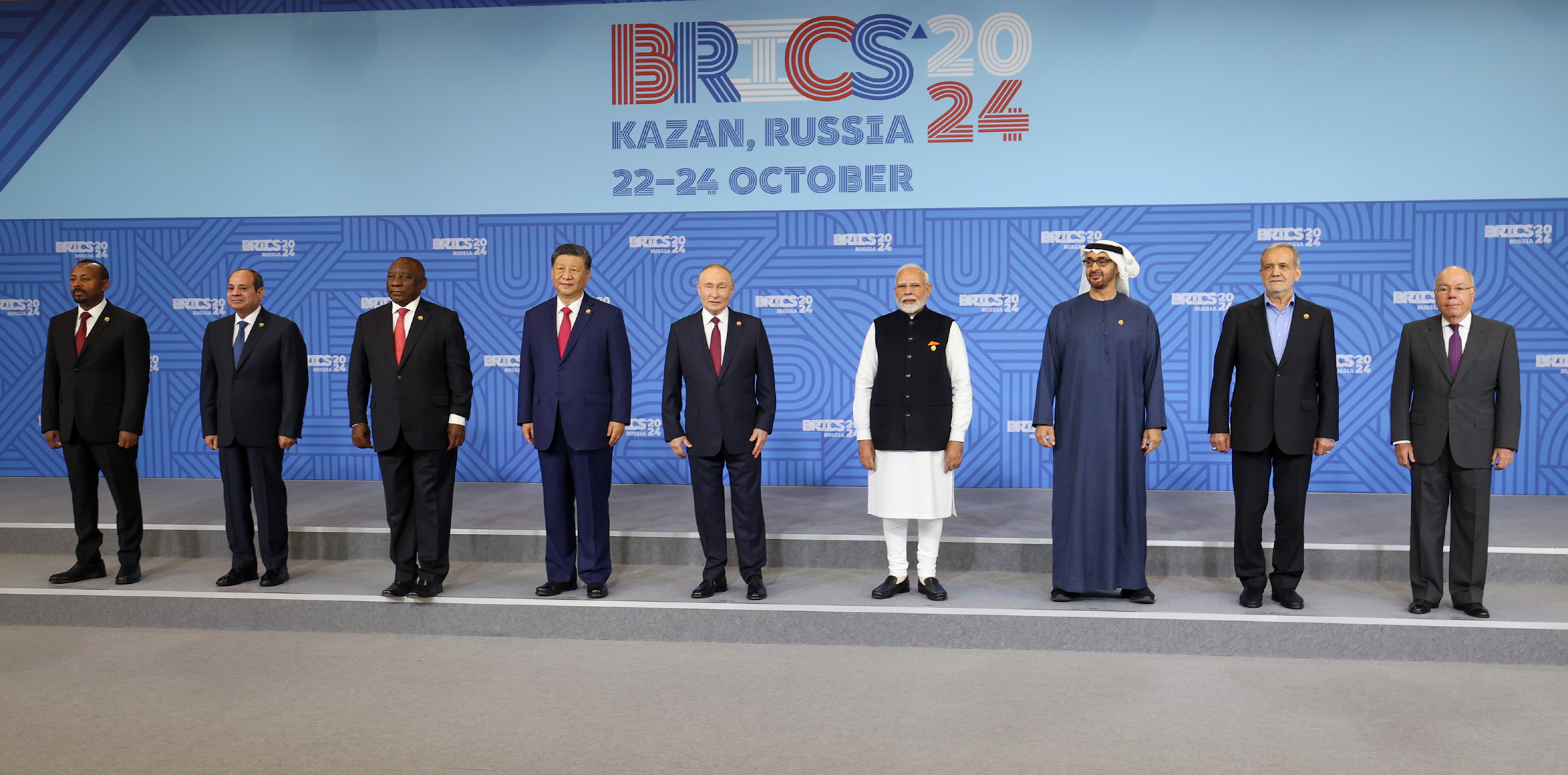
Abdel Fattah el-Sisi at the 16th BRICS Summit in Kazan, Russia, 2024

This is a list of international presidential trips made by Abdel Fattah el-Sisi, the sixth and current president of Egypt since 8 June 2014.

== Summary ==
The number of visits per country where President el-Sisi traveled are:

- One visit to Angola, Armenia, Austria, Azerbaijan, Belarus, Belgium, Brazil, Chad, Denmark, Djibouti, Gabon, Guinea, the Holy See, Indonesia, Ireland, Ivory Coast, Kazakhstan, Mozambique, Niger, Norway, Portugal, Romania, Senegal, Serbia, Singapore, Turkey, Uzbekistan, Vietnam and Zambia
- Two visits to Algeria, Italy, Rwanda, South Korea, Spain, Switzerland, Tanzania, Uganda and the United Kingdom
- Three visits Cyprus, Equatorial Guinea, Hungary, Iraq, Japan, Kenya and Oman
- Four visits to Greece
- Five visits to India and Kuwait
- Six visits to Bahrain, Ethiopia, Germany, Qatar and Sudan
- Seven visits to China, Jordan and Russia
- Eight visits to France
- Nine visits to the United States
- Fifteen visits to the United Arab Emirates
- Eighteen visits to Saudi Arabia

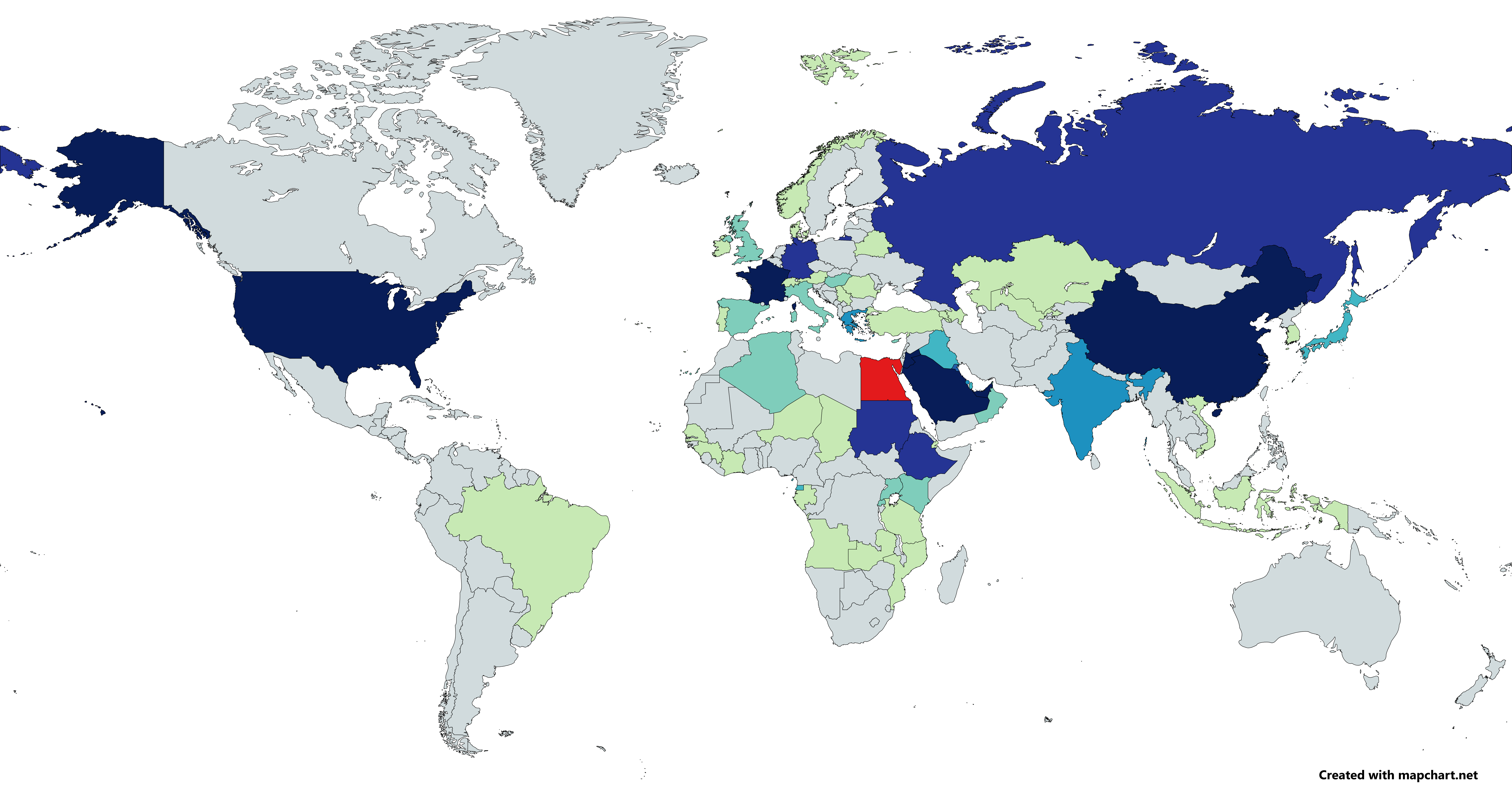
Map of international trips made by Abdel Fattah el-Sisi: One visit Two visits Three visits Four visits Five visits Six visits Seven or more visits Egypt

== 2014 ==
#	Country	Areas visited	Dates	Details
1	Algeria	Algiers	25 June	
1	Equatorial Guinea	Malabo	25–26 June	
1	Sudan	Khartoum	26-27 June	
2	Saudi Arabia	Jeddah	10–12 August	
2	Russia	Sochi	12–13 August	
3	United States	New York City	21–26 September	
4	Italy	Rome	24 November	
4	Holy See	Vatican City	24 November	
4	France	Paris	25 November	
5	Jordan	Amman	11 December	
6	China	Beijing, Sichuan	21–25 December	

== 2015 ==
#	Country	Areas visited	Dates	Details
7	Kuwait	Kuwait City	5–6 January	
8	United Arab Emirates	Abu Dhabi	18–19 January	
8	Saudi Arabia	Riyadh	19 January	
9	Switzerland	Zürich, Davos	21–23 January	
10	Saudi Arabia	Riyadh	24 January	
11	Ethiopia	Addis Ababa	28–30 January	
12	Saudi Arabia	Riyadh	1 March	
13	Sudan	Khartoum	23 March	
13	Ethiopia	Addis Ababa	23–25 March	
14	Cyprus	Nicosia	29 April	
14	Spain	Madrid	30 April	
15	Saudi Arabia	Riyadh	2 May	
16	Russia	Moscow	8–9 May	
17	Jordan	Amman	21–23 May	
18	Sudan	Khartoum	2–3 June	
18	Germany	Berlin	3–5 June	
19	Singapore	Singapore	30 August–1 September	
19	China	Beijing	1–3 September	
19	Indonesia	Jakarta	3–5 September	
20	United States	New York City	24–28 September	
21	United Arab Emirates	Abu Dhabi, Dubai	27–28 October	
21	India	New Delhi	28–29 October	
22	United Kingdom	London	4–6 November	
23	Saudi Arabia	Riyadh	10–11 November	
24	France	Paris	29 November–1 December	
25	Greece	Athens	8–9 December	

== 2016 ==
#	Country	Areas visited	Dates	Details
26	Ethiopia	Addis Ababa	29–31 January	
27	Kazakhstan	Astana	26–28 February	
27	Japan	Tokyo	28 February–2 March	
27	South Korea	Seoul	2–4 March	
28	Saudi Arabia	Hafar al-Batin	9–10 March	
29	Rwanda	Kigali	15–18 July	
30	India	New Delhi	1–3 September	
30	China	Hangzhou	3–5 September	
31	United States	New York City	18–22 September	
32	Sudan	Khartoum	11 October	
33	Portugal	Lisbon	20–22 November	
33	Equatorial Guinea	Malabo	22–23 November	
34	United Arab Emirates	Abu Dhabi	1–3 December	
35	Uganda	Entebbe	18 December	

== 2017 ==
#	Country	Areas visited	Dates	Details
36	Ethiopia	Addis Ababa	30–31 January	
37	Kenya	Nairobi	18 February	
38	Jordan	Amman	28–29 March	
39	United States	Washington, D.C.	1–6 April	
40	Saudi Arabia	Riyadh	23–24 April	
41	United Arab Emirates	Abu Dhabi	3–4 May	
42	Kuwait	Kuwait City	7–8 May	
42	Bahrain	Manama	8–9 May	
43	Saudi Arabia	Riyadh	20–21 May	
44	Germany	Berlin	11–13 June	
44	Uganda	Entebbe	22–24 June	
45	Hungary	Budapest	2–4 July	
46	Tanzania	Dar es Salaam	14–15 August	
46	Rwanda	Kigali	15–16 August	
46	Gabon	Libreville	16–17 August	
46	Chad	N'Djamena	17 August	
47	China	Xiamen	3–6 September	
47	Vietnam	Hanoi	6–7 September	
48	United States	New York City	17–22 September	
49	France	Paris	23–26 October	
50	Cyprus	Nicosia	20–21 November	

== 2018 ==
#	Country	Areas visited	Dates	Details
51	Ethiopia	Addis Ababa	27–29 January	
52	Oman	Muscat	4–6 February	
52	United Arab Emirates	Abu Dhabi	6–7 February	
53	Saudi Arabia	Dammam, Jubail	14–16 April	
54	Sudan	Khartoum	19–20 July	
55	Saudi Arabia	Neom	14 August	
56	Bahrain	Manama	30–31 August	
56	China	Beijing	31 August–4 September	
56	Uzbekistan	Tashkent	4 September	
57	United States	New York City	21–27 September	
58	Greece	Crete	7 October	
59	Russia	Moscow, Sochi	15–17 October	
60	Germany	Berlin	27–31 October	
61	Italy	Palermo	12–13 November	
62	Austria	Vienna	16–19 December	

== 2019 ==
#	Country	Areas visited	Dates	Details
63	Jordan	Amman	13 January	Met with King Abdullah II
64	Ethiopia	Addis Ababa	9-10 February	Attended the African Union summit and receives the presidency of the AU for the year 2019
65	Germany	Munich	14-17 February	Attended the Munich Security Conference
66	Guinea	Conakry	7 April	Met with President Alpha Condé
66	United States	Washington DC	8-9 April	Met with President Donald Trump
66	Ivory Coast	Abidjan	10-11 April	Met with President Alassane Ouattara
66	Senegal	Dakar	11 April	Met with President Macky Sall
67	China	Beijing	24-26 April	Attended the Belt and Road Forum for International Cooperation (BRFIC)
68	Belarus	Minsk	17-18 June	Official visit
68	Romania	Bucharest	18-19 June	Official visit
69	Japan	Osaka	28-29 June	Participated in a dinner banquet that was held on the sidelines of the G20 summit.
70	Niger	Niamey	6 July	Attended the 12th Extraordinary Summit of the African Union
71	France	Biarritz	25-26 August	Attended the 45th Group of Seven (G7) Summit
72	Japan	Yokohama	28-30 August	Attended the Seventh Tokyo International Conference on African Development (TICAD 7)
72	Kuwait	Kuwait City	31 August	Official visit
73	United States	New York City	21-22 September	Attended the 74th session of the UN General Assembly
74	United Arab Emirates	Abu Dhabi	14-15 November	Official visit
75	Germany	Berlin	17-21 November	Attended the meetings of G20 Compact with Africa

== 2020 ==
#	Country	Areas visited	Dates	Details
76	France	Paris	7 December	Met with President Emmanuel Macron

== 2021 ==
#	Country	Areas visited	Dates	Details
77	Jordan	Amman	18-19 January	Met with King Abdullah II
78	Sudan	Khartoum	6 March	Met with President of the Transitional Sovereignty Council (TSC) Abdel Fattah al-Burhan
79	France	Paris	17-18 May	Attended the Conference to support the transition in Sudan and the Summit on Financing African Economies. Met with President Emmanuel Macron
80	Djibouti	Djibouti	28 May	Met with President Ismail Omar Guelleh
81	Iraq	Baghdad	27 June	Attended a tripartite summit with Iraqi Prime Minister Mustafa al-Kadhimi and Jordan's King Abdullah II
82	Iraq	Baghdad	29 August	Attended the Baghdad Cooperation and Partnership Conference
83	Hungary	Budapest	11 October	Attended the Egypt-Visegrad Group Summit
84	Greece	Athens	19 October	Attended the 9th Tripartite Summit between Egypt, Greece, and Cyprus
85	United Kingdom	Glasgow	31 October-2 November	Attended the 2021 United Nations Climate Change Conference (COP26)
86	France	Paris	11-12 November	Attended the Paris International Conference on Libya. Met with President Emmanuel Macron

== 2022 ==
#	Country	Areas visited	Dates	Details
87	Oman	Muscat	27–28 June	State visit. Met with Sultan Haitham bin Tariq
87	Bahrain	Manama	28–29 June	State visit.
88	Germany	Berlin	17–18 July	Met with Chancellor Olaf Scholz. Attended the Petersberg Climate Dialogue XII.
88	Serbia	Belgrade	19–21 July	State visit. Met President Aleksandar Vučić
89	Qatar	Doha	13–14 September	The first visit since the breakdown in relations in 2017
90	Algeria	Algiers	1–2 November	Attended the 31st Arab League Summit
91	Qatar	Al Khor	20 November	Attended 2022 FIFA World Cup opening ceremony
92	United States	Washington, D.C.	13–15 December	Attended the US-Africa Leaders Summit

== 2023 ==
#	Country	Areas visited	Dates	Details
93	United Arab Emirates	Abu Dhabi	18 January	Took part in the Abu Dhabi Summit
94	India	New Delhi	24–27 January	State visit
94	Azerbaijan	Baku	27 January	Met with President of Azerbaijan, Ilham Aliyev
94	Armenia	Yerevan	28 January	First visit by an Egyptian president since Armenia's independence
95	United Arab Emirates	Abu Dhabi	12 February	Attended the World Government Summit and met with Mohammed bin Zayed, the President of the United Arab Emirates.
96	Saudi Arabia	Jeddah	3 April	Met with Saudi Crown Prince Mohammed bin Salman to discuss bilateral relations
97	Saudi Arabia	Jeddah	18 May	Attended the 32nd session of the Arab League Council.
98	Angola	Luanda	7 June	Met President João Lourenço
98	Zambia	Lusaka	7–8 June	Met President Hakainde Hichilema and attended the 22nd summit of the Common Market for Eastern and Southern Africa (COMESA)
98	Mozambique	Maputo	9 June	Met President Filipe Nyusi
99	France	Paris	22-23 June	Attended the "New Global Financial Pact" Summit
100	Kenya	Nairobi	15–16 July	Attended the Coordination Meeting of African Union and Met President William Ruto
101	Russia	Saint Petersburg	26–29 July	Attended the Russia–Africa Economic and Humanitarian Forum
102	India	New Delhi	9–10 September	Attended the 2023 G20 New Delhi summit
103	United Arab Emirates	Abu Dhabi	18 September	Discussed the bilateral relations between the two countries
104	Saudi Arabia	Riyadh	11 November	Attended the joint Islamic-Arab extraordinary summit
105	United Arab Emirates	Dubai	30 November–2 December	Attended the COP28
106	Kuwait	Kuwait City	17 December	Offered condolences on the passing of the late Amir of Kuwait, Nawaf Al-Ahmad Al-Jaber Al-Sabah

== 2024 ==
#	Country	Areas Visited	Dates	Details
107	Jordan	Aqaba	10 January	Participated in an Egyptian-Jordanian-Palestinian summit with Mahmoud Abbas and Abdullah II
108	Jordan	Aqaba	2 April	Met with King Abdullah II
109	Bahrain	Manama	16 May	Attended the 33rd Arab League Summit.
110	China	Beijing	28–30 May	Attended the 10th China-Arab States Cooperation Forum
111	Saudi Arabia	Mecca, Medina	13–16 June	Performing Hajj pilgrimage
112	Turkey	Ankara	4 September	
113	Russia	Kazan	22–24 October	16th BRICS summit
114	Brazil	Rio de Janeiro	18-19 November	Attended the G20 summit
115	Denmark	Copenhagen	6–8 December	Official visit.
115	Norway	Oslo	8–10 December	Official visit.
115	Ireland	Dublin	10–11 December	Official visit.

== 2025 ==
#	Country	Areas Visited	Dates	Details
116	United Arab Emirates	Abu Dhabi	16 January	Met with President of the United Arab Emirates, Mohamed bin Zayed Al Nahyan
117	Spain	Madrid	18-20 February	Official visit
118	Qatar	Doha	13 April	Met with the Amir Tamim bin Hamad Al Thani
119	Kuwait	Kuwait City	14 April	Met with Amir Mishal Al-Ahmad Al-Jaber Al-Sabah
120	Greece	Athens	7-8 May	Official visit
120	Russia	Moscow	8-9 May	Attended the 80th Anniversary of Victory Day celebrations and met with Russian President Vladimir Putin
121	Iraq	Baghdad	17 May	Attended the 34th regular session of the Council of the League of Arab States
122	United Arab Emirates	Abu Dhabi	4 June	Met with President of the United Arab Emirates, Mohamed bin Zayed Al Nahyan
123	Equatorial Guinea	Malabo	12-13 July	Attended the summit of the African Union
124	Saudi Arabia	Neom	21 August	Met with Crown Prince of Saudi Arabia Mohammed bin Salman
125	Qatar	Doha	15 September	Attended the 2025 Arab-Islamic extraordinary summit
126	Belgium	Brussels	21-22 October	Attended the first EU-Egypt summit and met with the King of Belgium, King Philippe

== 2026 ==
#	Country	Areas Visited	Dates	Details
127	Switzerland	Davos	20-23 January	Attended the World Economic Forum.
128	United Arab Emirates	Abu Dhabi	9 February	Met with Sheikh Mohamed bin Zayed Al Nahyan.
129	Saudi Arabia	Jeddah	23 February	Met with the Crown Prince Mohammed bin Salman.
130	United Arab Emirates	Abu Dhabi	19 March	Met with Sheikh Mohamed bin Zayed Al Nahyan.
130	Qatar	Doha	19 March	Met with Sheikh Tamim bin Hamad Al Thani.
131	Saudi Arabia	Jeddah	21 March	Met with the Crown Prince Mohammed bin Salman.
131	Bahrain	Manama	21 March	Met with the King Hamad bin Isa Al Khalifa.
132	Cyprus	Larnaca	24 April	Attended a meeting between leaders of several Arab countries and European Union countries.
133	United Arab Emirates	Abu Dhabi	7 May	Met with Sheikh Mohamed bin Zayed Al Nahyan.
133	Oman	Muscat	7 May	Met with Sultan Haitham bin Tariq.
134	Kenya	Nairobi	11 May	Attended the Africa Forward summit.
135	France	Évian-les-Bains	15–17 June	Attended the 52nd G7 summit.
136	Bahrain	Manama	14 July	Met with King Hamad bin Isa Al Khalifa.
136	Qatar	Doha	14–15 July	Met with Sheikh Tamim bin Hamad Al Thani and Prime Minister Mohammed bin Abdulrahman bin Jassim Al Thani and offered condolences on the death of former Emir Hamad bin Khalifa Al Thani.
137	Tanzania	Dar es Salaam	18 July	Co-chaired the Egypt-Tanzania business forum with President Samia Suluhu Hassan.
138	India	New Delhi	11–13 September	Attended the 18th BRICS summit.
139	South Korea	Seoul	6–9 October	Met with President Lee Jae Myung during the state visit.
139	Malaysia	Kuala Lumpur	9-10 October	Met with King Ibrahim Ismail and Prime minister Anwar Ibrahim during the state visit.
139	Indonesia	Jakarta	10-12 October	Met with President Prabowo Subianto during an official visit.
140	Russia	Moscow	28–29 October	Attended the third Russia–Africa Summit and delivered Egypt's address at the plenary session. Held talks with President Vladimir Putin at the Kremlin on the sidelines.
140	Hungary	Budapest	29-30 October	Met with Prime minister Péter Magyar.

== Future trips ==
Country	Location	Date	Details
Turkey	Antalya	November	El Sisi is scheduled to attend the 2026 United Nations Climate Change Conference.
China	Shenzhen	18–19 November	El Sisi is expected to attend the APEC China 2026.
Saudi Arabia	Jeddah or Riyadh	To be announced	El Sisi is scheduled to attend the 2026 AL summit.
Azerbaijan	Baku	23-24 June 2027	El Sisi is scheduled to attend the 16th OIC summit.
