= List of international presidential trips made by Abdel Fattah al-Burhan =

Abdel Fattah al-Burhan has made multiple public international trips to 29 countries as the head of state of Sudan since 12 April 2019.

== Summary ==
The number of visits per country where Abdel Fattah al-Burhan traveled are:

One visit: Angola, Bahrain, China, France, Guinea-Bissau, Libya, Mali, Mauritania, Oman, Russia, Rwanda, Senegal, Sierra Leone, Spain and Switzerland.

Two visits: Algeria, Azerbaijan, Djibouti, Ethiopia, Kenya and the United Arab Emirates.

Three visits: Chad, South Sudan and the United States.

Four visits: Eritrea and Uganda.

Five visits: Qatar and Turkey.

Six visits: Saudi Arabia.

Nine visits: Egypt.

== 2019 ==
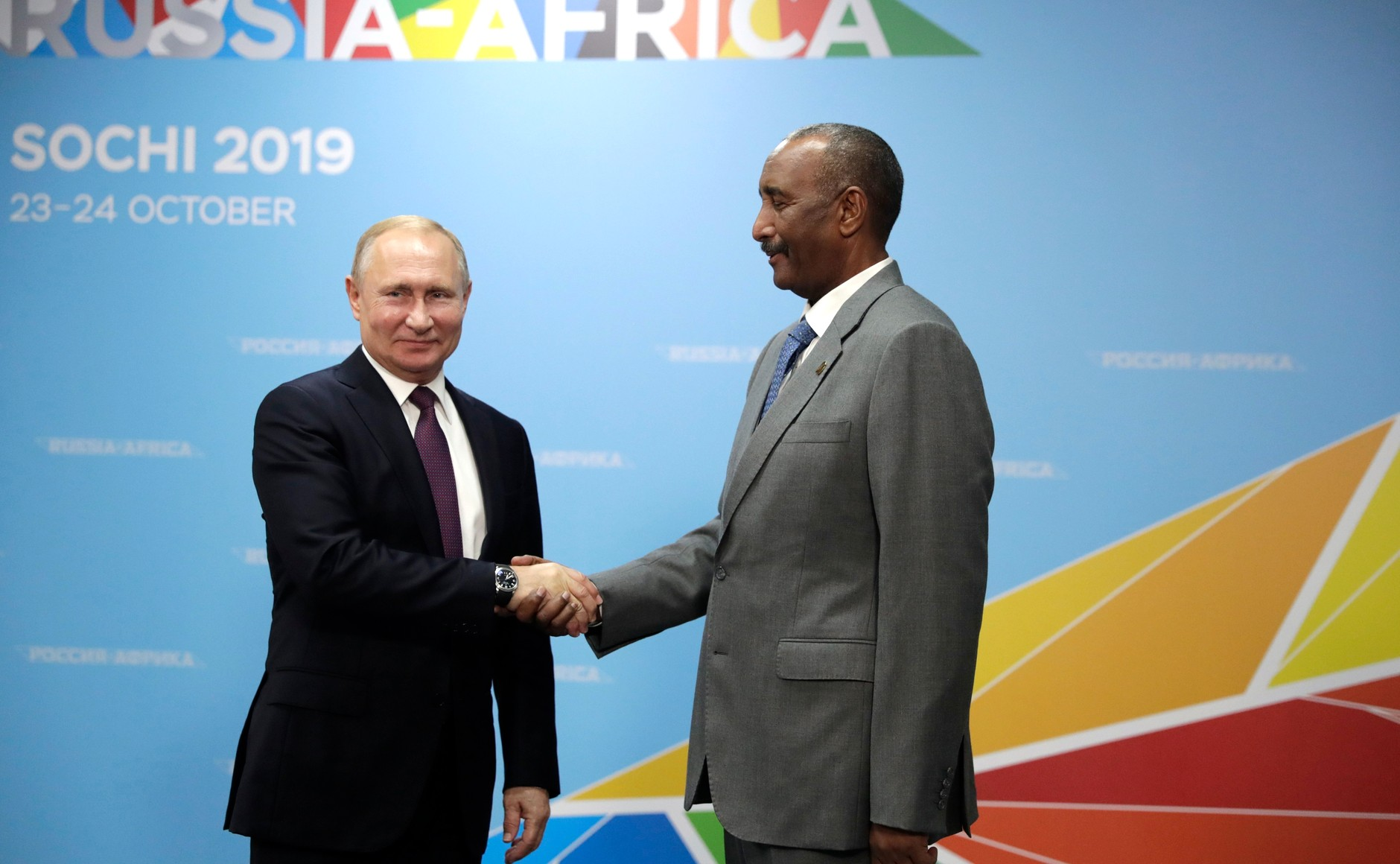
al-Burhan with Russian President Vladimir Putin during the Russia–Africa Summit in Sochi, Russia – 23 October 2019.

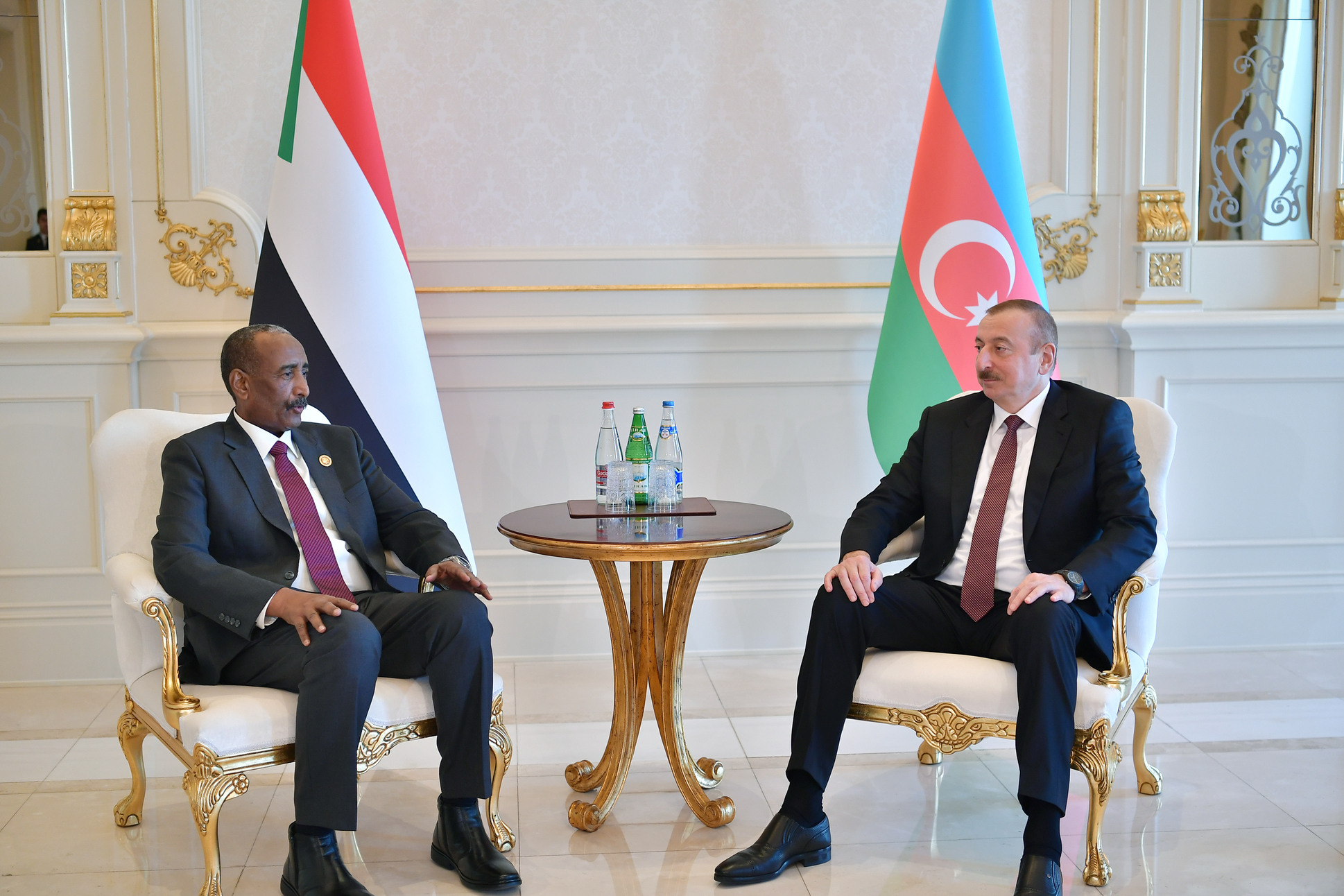
al-Burhan with Azerbaijani President Ilham Aliyev during the 18th Summit of the Non-Aligned Movement in Baku, Azerbaijan – 25 October 2019

Country	Areas visited	Dates	Details
Egypt	Cairo	25–26 May	Met with President Abdel Fattah el-Sisi.
Chad	N'Djamena	17 June	Met with President Idriss Déby.
Uganda	Kampala	5–7 July	Met with President Yoweri Museveni.
Russia	Sochi	22–25 October	Met with President Vladimir Putin and attended the 1st Russia–Africa Summit.
Azerbaijan	Baku	25–27 October	Met with President Ilham Aliyev and attended the 18th Summit of the Non-Aligned Movement.

== 2020 ==
Country	Areas visited	Dates	Details
Uganda	Kampala	2–4 February	Met with President Yoweri Museveni and held a secret bilateral meeting with Israeli Prime Minister Benjamin Netanyahu to discuss normalization of relations between Israel and Sudan.
Chad	N'Djamena	20–21 August	Met with President Idriss Déby.
Eritrea	Asmara	7–8 September	Met with President Isaias Afwerki.
United Arab Emirates	Abu Dhabi	20–21 September	Met with Crown Prince Mohamed bin Zayed Al Nahyan.
Ethiopia	Addis Ababa	1–2 November	Met with Prime Minister Abiy Ahmed.

== 2021 ==
Country	Areas visited	Dates	Details
Qatar	Doha	7–8 April	Met with Sheikh Tamim bin Hamad Al Thani.
France	Paris	17–18 May	Met with President Emmanuel Macron and attended the International Conference for Sudan.
Turkey	Ankara	13–14 August	Met with President Recep Tayyip Erdoğan.

== 2022 ==
Country	Areas visited	Dates	Details
Uganda	Kampala	17 March	Met with President Yoweri Museveni.
Saudi Arabia	Riyadh	20–22 March	Met with King Salman.
Egypt	Cairo	30–31 March	Met with President Abdel Fattah el-Sisi.
United States	New York City	21–23 September	Addressed the 77th session of the United Nations General Assembly.
Algeria	Algiers	1–3 November	Met with President Abdelmadjid Tebboune and attended the 32nd Arab League Summit.
Saudi Arabia	Riyadh	8–10 December	Met with Crown Prince Mohammed bin Salman, attended the China–Arab States Summit and held a bilateral meeting with Chinese President Xi Jinping.

== 2023 ==
Country	Areas visited	Dates	Details
South Sudan	Juba	12–13 January	Met with President Salva Kiir.
Chad	N'Djamena	30–31 January	Met with President Mahamat Déby.
United Arab Emirates	Abu Dhabi	14–15 February	Met with Sheikh Mohamed bin Zayed Al Nahyan.
Egypt	El Alamein	29–30 August	Met with President Abdel Fattah el-Sisi.
South Sudan	Juba	4–5 September	Met with President Salva Kiir.
Qatar	Doha	7–9 September	Met with Sheikh Tamim bin Hamad Al Thani.
Eritrea	Asmara	11–12 September	Met with President Isaias Afwerki.
Turkey	Ankara	13–14 September	Met with President Recep Tayyip Erdoğan.
Uganda	Kampala	16–18 September	Met with President Yoweri Museveni.
United States	New York City	20–22 September	Addressed the 78th session of the United Nations General Assembly.
Saudi Arabia	Riyadh	8–11 November	Met with Crown Prince Mohammed bin Salman, attended the Saudi–African Summit and the Islamic–Arab extraordinary summit.
Kenya	Nairobi	13–14 November	Met with President William Ruto.
Ethiopia	Addis Ababa	14–15 November	Met with Prime Minister Abiy Ahmed.
Djibouti	Djibouti City	26–27 November	Met with President Ismaïl Omar Guelleh.
Djibouti	Djibouti City	9–11 December	Met with President Ismaïl Omar Guelleh and attended the summit of the Intergovernmental Authority on Development.

== 2024 ==
Country	Areas visited	Dates	Details
Algeria	Algiers	28–29 January	Met with President Abdelmadjid Tebboune.
Libya	Tripoli	26–27 February	Met with Chairman of the Presidential Council Mohamed al-Menfi and Prime Minister of the Government of National Unity Abdul Hamid Dbeibeh.
Egypt	Cairo	29 February–1 March	Met with President Abdel Fattah el-Sisi.
Rwanda	Kigali	11–12 August	Met with President Paul Kagame.
Angola	Luanda	12 August	Met with President João Lourenço.
Kenya	Nairobi	12–13 August	Met with President William Ruto.
Egypt	Cairo	14–15 August	Met with President Abdel Fattah el-Sisi.
China	Beijing	3–6 September	Met with President Xi Jinping and Premier Li Qiang and attended the Forum on China–Africa Cooperation.
United States	New York City	25–27 September	Addressed the 79th session of the United Nations General Assembly.
Azerbaijan	Baku	12–13 November	Met with President Ilham Aliyev and attended the 29th United Nations Climate Change Conference.
Eritrea	Asmara	26–27 November	Met with President Isaias Afwerki.
South Sudan	Juba	4–5 December	Met with President Salva Kiir.

== 2025 ==
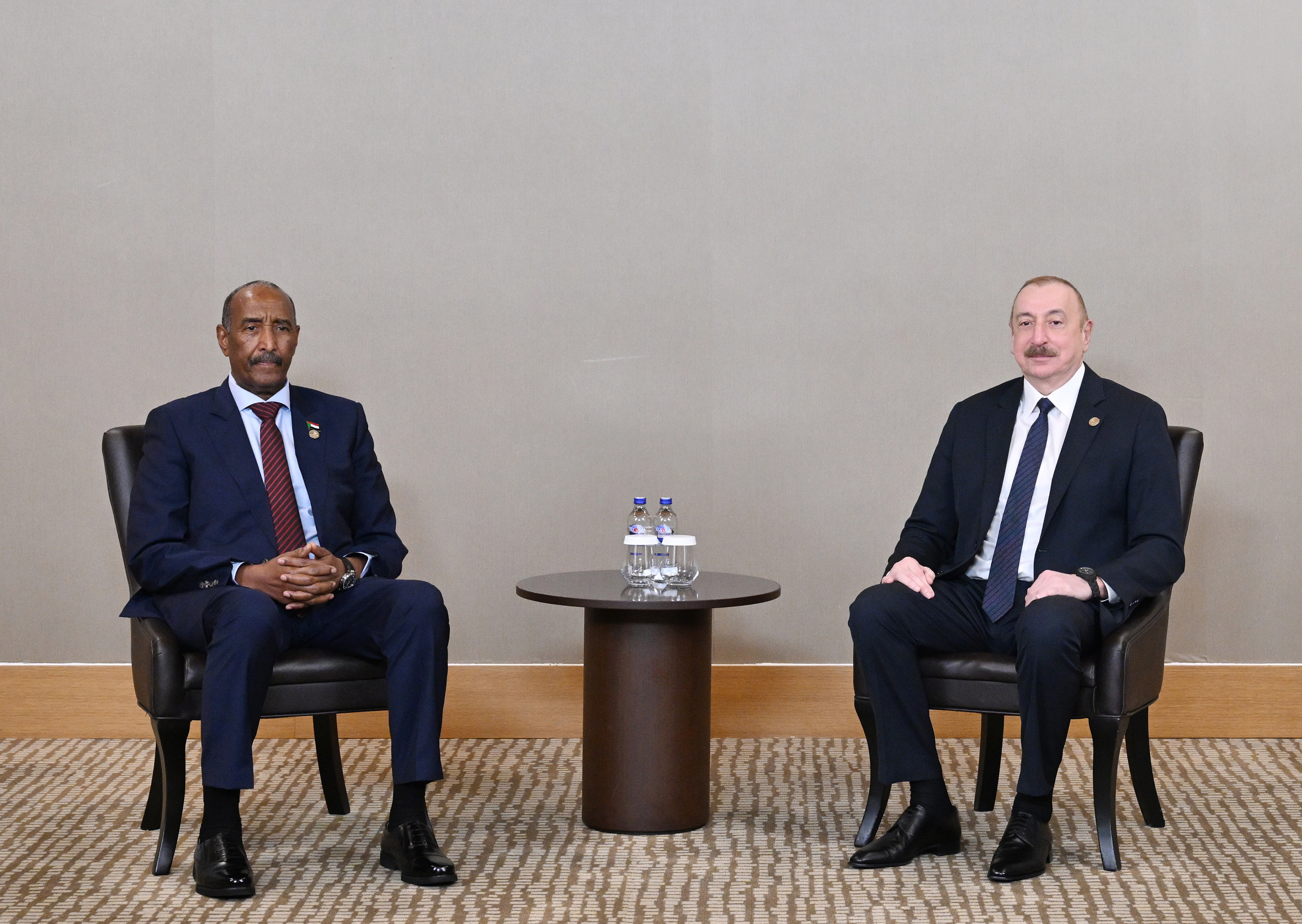
al-Burhan with Azerbaijani President Ilham Aliyev during the Antalya Diplomacy Forum in Antalya, Turkey – 11 April 2025

Country	Areas visited	Dates	Details
Mali	Bamako	11–12 January	Met with President Assimi Goïta.
Guinea-Bissau	Bissau	12–13 January	Met with President Umaro Sissoco Embaló.
Sierra Leone	Freetown	13 January	Met with President Julius Maada Bio.
Senegal	Dakar	13 January	Met with President Bassirou Diomaye Faye.
Mauritania	Nouakchott	13–14 January	Met with President Mohamed Ould Ghazouani.
Saudi Arabia	Jeddah	28–29 March	Met with Crown Prince Mohammed bin Salman.
Eritrea	Asmara	10–11 April	Met with President Isaias Afwerki.
Turkey	Antalya	11–13 April	Met with President Recep Tayyip Erdoğan, attended the Antalya Diplomacy Forum and held bilateral meetings with Azerbaijani President Ilham Aliyev, Libyan Prime Minister Abdul Hamid Dbeibeh and Sierra Leonean President Julius Maada Bio.
Egypt	Cairo	28–29 April	Met with President Abdel Fattah el-Sisi.
Spain	Seville	29–30 June	Met with King Felipe VI, Prime Minister Pedro Sánchez and UN Secretary-General António Guterres and attended the 4th International Conference on Financing for Development.
Egypt	Cairo	30 June–1 July	Met with President Abdel Fattah el-Sisi.
Switzerland	Zurich	13–15 August	Working visit.
Qatar	Doha	15 September	Met with Sheikh Tamim bin Hamad Al Thani and attended the Arab–Islamic extraordinary summit.
Egypt	Cairo	15–16 October	Met with President Abdel Fattah el-Sisi.
Saudi Arabia	Riyadh	15–16 December	Met with Crown Prince Mohammed bin Salman.
Egypt	Cairo	18–19 December	Met with President Abdel Fattah el-Sisi.
Turkey	Ankara	25–27 December	Met with President Recep Tayyip Erdoğan.

== 2026 ==
Country	Areas visited	Dates	Details
Qatar	Doha	27–28 January	Met with Sheikh Tamim bin Hamad Al Thani.
Saudi Arabia	Jeddah	20–21 April	Met with Crown Prince Mohammed bin Salman.
Oman	Muscat	21–22 April	Met with Sultan Haitham bin Tariq.
Bahrain	Manama	13–14 May	Met with King Hamad bin Isa Al Khalifa.
Turkey	Ankara	2–3 June	Met with President Recep Tayyip Erdoğan.
Qatar	Doha	14–15 July	Met with Sheikh Tamim bin Hamad Al Thani and Prime Minister Mohammed bin Abdulrahman bin Jassim Al Thani and offered condolences on the death of former Emir Hamad bin Khalifa Al Thani.
