= 2024 Italy–Africa Summit =

Diplomatic conference in Rome

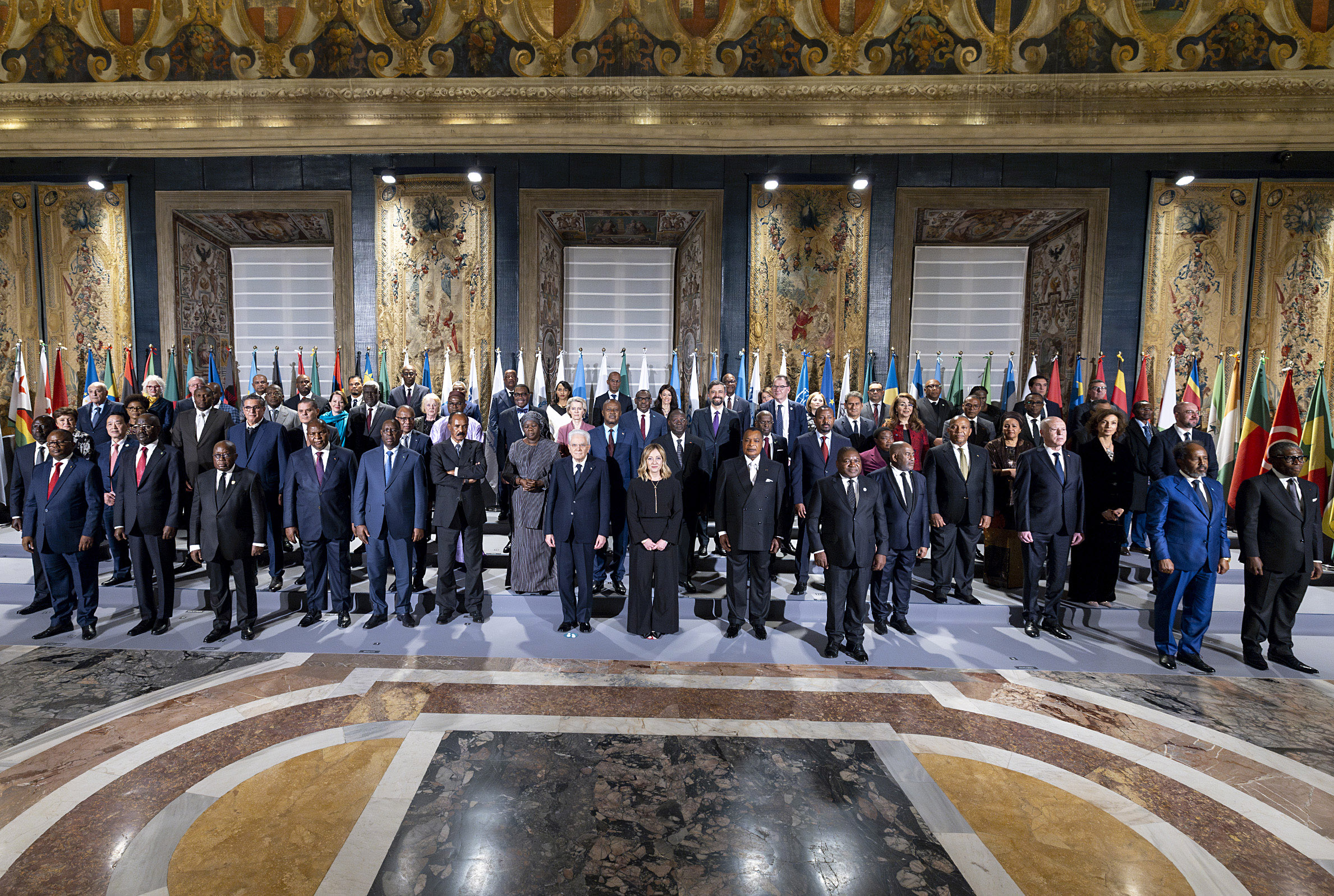
- Group photo at the 2024 Italy–Africa Summit in Rome
- Host country: Italy
- Date: 28–29 January 2024
- Cities: Rome
- Venues: Palazzo Madama

The 2024 Italy–Africa Summit took place in Rome on 28–29 January. Hosted by the government of Italy, the summit was attended by representatives of forty-five African countries as well as the African Union.

== Background ==
The summit was held within the context of a rise in immigration from North Africa to Italy, particularly by using boats to cross the Mediterranean Sea. Following the 2022 Italian general election, Giorgia Meloni of the Brothers of Italy became Prime Minister, after running on a platform of curbing illegal immigration and soft Euroscepticism. The announcement of the summit was seen as Meloni attempting to increase the status of Italy's foreign policy and curb immigration.

== Summit ==
The summit was hosted in the Palazzo Madama in Rome. The President of Italy, Sergio Mattarella, received the heads of the delegations in the Quirinale Palace on 28 January.

A central focus of the summit was the unveiling of the Mattei Plan, a strategic initiative named after Enrico Mattei, founder of the Italian energy giant Eni. With an annual budget of 3 billion euros over four years, the plan seeks to address the root economic causes of mass migration, emphasizing energy cooperation, investment in health and education, and critical infrastructure development. However, the Mattei Plan faces challenges, including Italy's financial constraints and competition with global players in Africa. Critics question its feasibility and suggest a need for a clearer strategy.

Italy announced an initial 5.5 billion euro investment for the plan.

== Participating countries ==
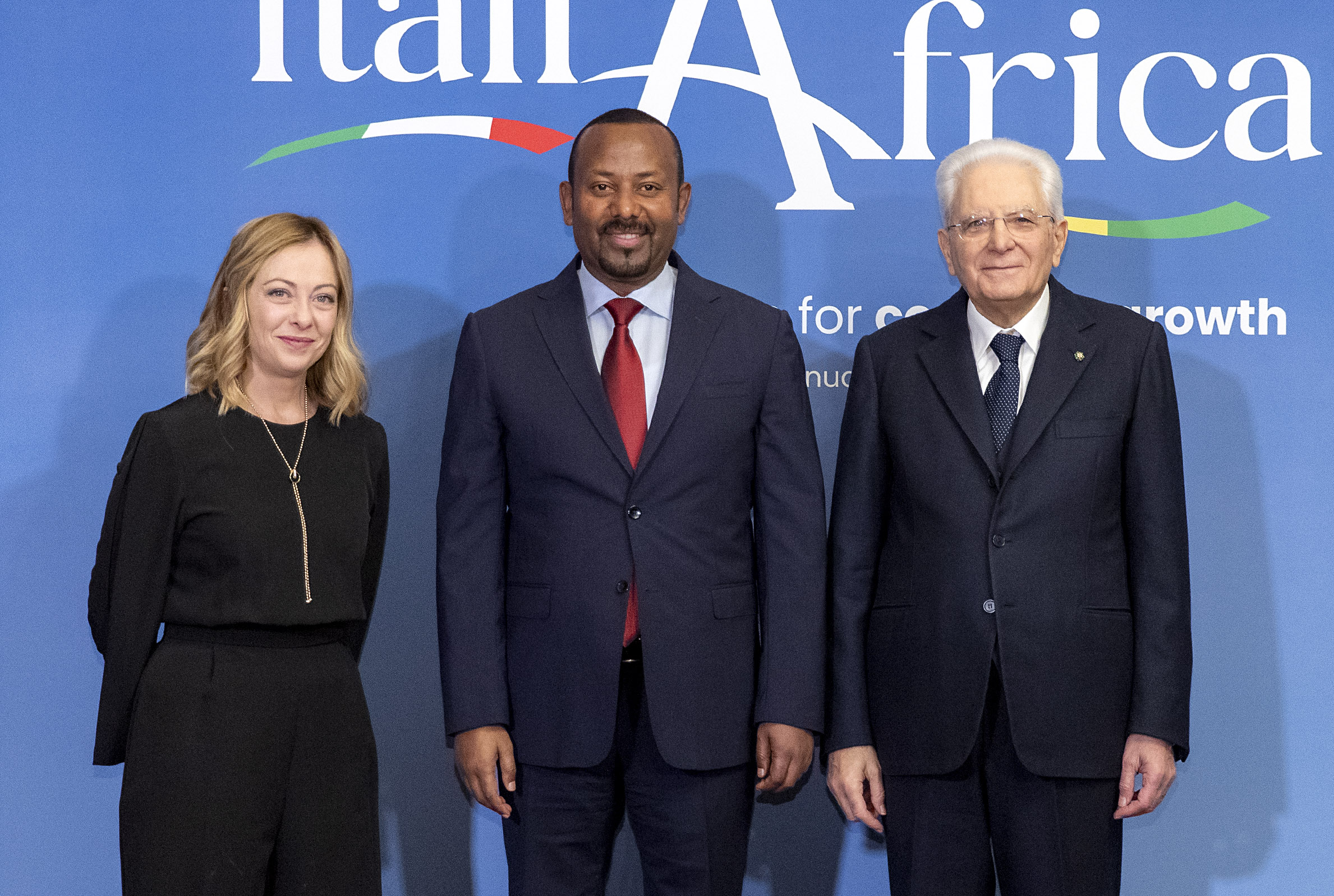
Italian Prime Minister Giorgia Meloni and President Sergio Mattarella with Ethiopian Prime Minister Abiy Ahmed at the summit in Rome, 28 January 2024

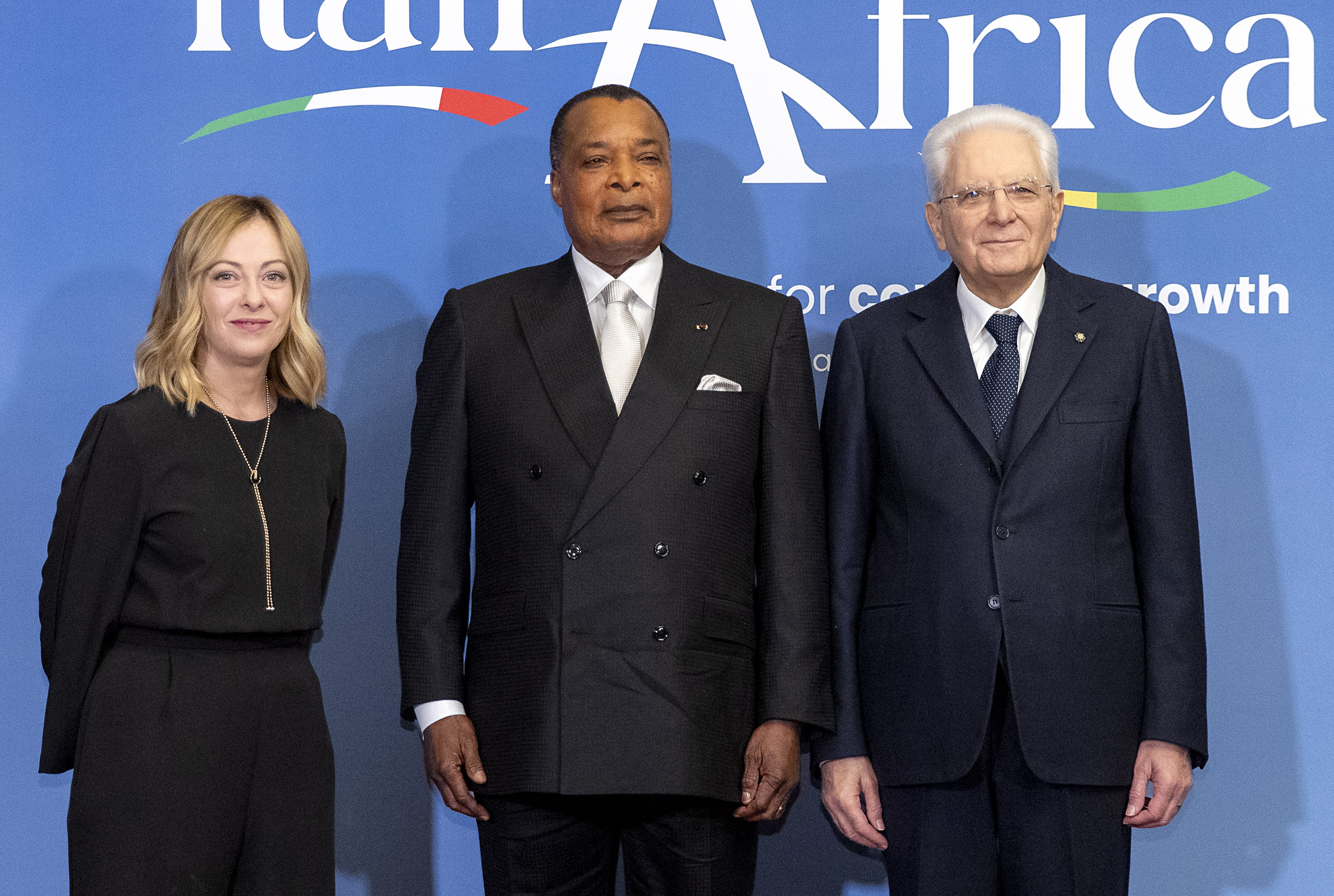
Mattarella and Meloni with Congolese President Denis Sassou Nguesso at the summit in Rome, 28 January 2024.

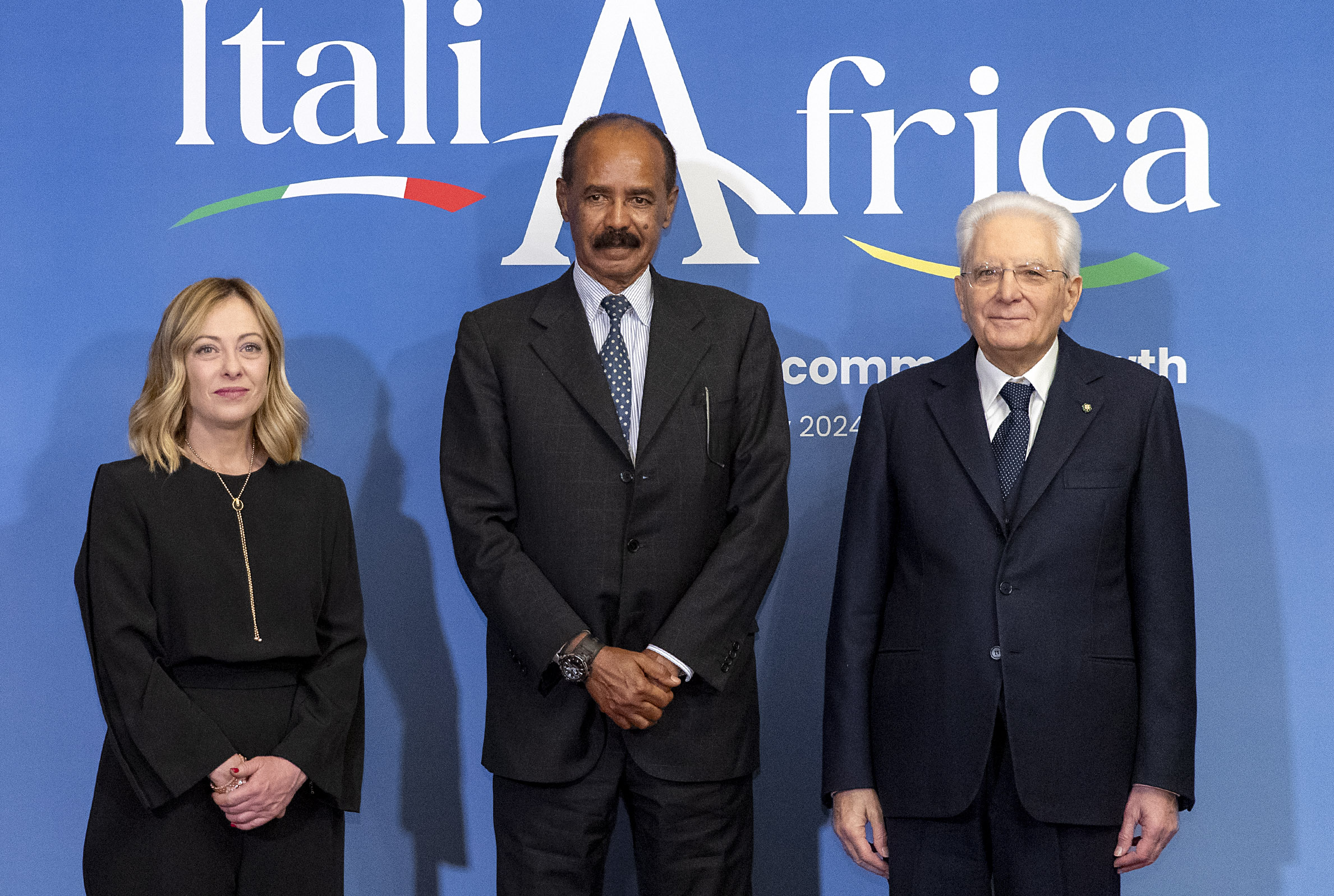
Mattarella and Meloni with Eritrean President Isaias Afwerki at the summit in Rome, 28 January 2024

Representatives of forty-five countries from Africa as well as the African Union attended the meeting. This included more than 20 head of states as well as representatives from the European Union.

The participants included:

- Vice President of Benin, Mariam Chabi Talata
- Vice-President of Burundi, Prosper Bazombanza
- (Cape Verde) Prime Minister of Cabo Verde, Ulisses Correia e Silva
- President of the Central African Republic, Faustin-Archange Touadéra
- President of Comoros, Azali Assoumani
- President of the Republic of the Congo, Denis Sassou Nguesso
- Vice President of Ivory Coast, Tiémoko Meyliet Koné
- Prime Minister of Djibouti, Abdoulkader Kamil Mohamed
- Vice President of Equatorial Guinea, Teodoro Nguema Obiang Mangue
- President of Eritrea, Isaias Afwerki
- Prime Minister of Eswatini, Russell Dlamini
- Prime Minister of Ethiopia, Abiy Ahmed
- President of Ghana, Nana Akufo-Addo
- President of Guinea-Bissau, Umaro Sissoco Embaló
- Prime Minister of Italy, Giorgia Meloni
- President of Kenya, William Ruto
- Prime Minister of Libya, Abdul Hamid Dbeibeh
- President of Mauritania, Mohamed Ould Ghazouani
- Prime Minister of Morocco, Aziz Akhannouch
- President of Mozambique, Filipe Nyusi
- Prime Minister of São Tomé and Príncipe, Patrice Trovoada
- President of Senegal, Macky Sall
- President of Somalia, Hassan Sheikh Mohamud
- Vice President of The Gambia, Muhammad B.S. Jallow
- President of Tunisia, Kais Saied
- Prime Minister of Uganda, Robinah Nabbanja
- President of Zimbabwe, Emmerson Mnangagwa
- (European Union) European Commission President, Ursula Von der Leyen
- (European Union) European Council President, Charles Michel
- (European Union) Head of the EU Parliament, Roberta Metsola
- Chairperson of the African Union, Azali Assoumani
- (African Union) Chairperson of the AU Commission, Moussa Faki

Non-head of state or head of government delegations were present from Algeria, Angola, Botswana, Cameroon, Chad, Democratic Republic of the Congo, Egypt, Lesotho, Madagascar, Malawi, Mauritius, Namibia, Rwanda, Seychelles, Sierra Leone, South Africa, South Sudan, Tanzania, Togo, and Zambia. Various international organizations including the IMF, IEA, World Bank, and United Nations were also represented.

== Aftermath ==
Italy, coinciding with its G7 presidency in 2024, emphasizes strategic partnerships with Africa, and is set to invite the leaders of four African countries and the African Union to the G7 summit in Rome in June 2024.

== See also ==
- United States–Africa Leaders Summit 2022
- 2026 Russia–Africa Summit
