= China–Arab States Cooperation Forum =

Multilateral cooperation group

The China–Arab States Cooperation Forum (CASCF, Chinese: 中国－阿拉伯国家合作论坛) is a formal dialogue initiative between China and the Arab League established in 2004. It serves as the primary multilateral coordination mechanism between China and the Arab states.

== Background and membership ==
CASCF was established in 2004 during a visit by CCP General Secretary Hu Jintao to the Arab League headquarters in Cairo, Egypt. At the end of the meeting, Foreign Minister of China Li Zhaoxing and Secretary General Moussa jointly announced the establishment of the "China-Arab Cooperation Forum" and issued the "Communiqué on the Establishment of the China-Arab Cooperation Forum".

CASCF was the first cooperation forum between the Arab League and any other country or region. CASCF membership consists of China and the Arab League, which officially represents its twenty-two member states as a relatively unified body. CASCF therefore serves as the primary multilateral coordination mechanism between China and the Arab States. This coordination by the Arab League allows Arab states to negotiate actively for collective projects involving multiple states, such as railway projects, nuclear power projects, and Dead Sea initiatives.

From 2011 to 2023, during the suspension of their Arab League memberships in 2011, Libya and Syria participated individually in CASCF.

Since 2018, China frames CASCF as falling within its Belt and Road Initiative.

== Political norms and activities ==
The core political norms that China advocates within CASCF are its Five Principles of Peaceful Coexistence: mutual respect for territory and sovereignty, mutual nonaggression, mutual noninterference in internal affairs, equality and mutual benefit, and peaceful co-existence. These principles are a conservative interpretation of the Westphalian norms of state sovereignty. China's advocacy for this strict interpretation of Westphalian sovereignty has intensified since the 2011 NATO intervention in Libya, creating some tensions within CASCF over the positions China (as a member of the United Nations Security Council) takes on Syria, although generally the Arab League states continue to support China's advocacy of the Five Principles.

In contrast to China's mostly similar cooperation forum with Africa (the Forum on China-Africa Cooperation, or FOCAC), CASCF is more focused on international and regional political issues. Many Arab states view China as a great power which can assist them in the international community, especially via the UN Security Council.

The most prominent political issue advocated through CASCF is a Middle East peace process aimed at resolving the Arab-Israeli conflict (including the territorial disputes that Lebanon and Syria each have with Israel). Other issues which have emerged following the Arab Spring include the Syrian civil war, and issues in Iraq, Libya, Yemen, Sudan, and Somalia.

In recent years, CASCF documents have noted Arab states' support for China's approach in Hong Kong. Besides, CASCF has an ambassador position, a role which is filed by a senior official from China's foreign affairs ministry.

=== Support for Palestine ===
Throughout the development of CASCF, Arab states have urged China to use the forum to strengthen its support for Palestine; CASCF's statements of support for Palestine have grown stronger over time.

In its 2004 founding declaration, CASCF states, "China stresses support for the Middle Eastern peace process, land for peace principle and the Beirut Summit Arab Peace Initiative." The action plan from the 2004 summit provides concrete detail, calling for strengthening the UN's peace process role and an independent state for Palestinians. The 2008 CASCF declaration goes further, calling on Israel to end the occupation of lands occupied since 1967, for the work of the international community to lift the blockade on Palestinians, and for Israel to stop building settlements. In response to united pressure from the Arab states, CASCF agreed in 2010 to call specifically for an end of Israel's occupation in East Jerusalem. The 2012 CASCF declaration called for Palestine to become a full member of the UN and of UNESCO. Subsequent CASCF declarations have echoed these positions. Of particular note, the 2018 declaration calls on all states to implement UN Security Council Resolution 2334 (2016) (which condemns measures designed to change the demographic make-up of occupied Palestinian territory, including East Jerusalem) and explicitly criticizes the United States for moving its embassy in Israel to Jerusalem.

During the 2024 CASCF Summit, CCP General Secretary Xi Jinping stated that a two-state solution must be upheld and that war must not continue indefinitely. China pledged a further US$69 million in emergency humanitarian relief for Palestine and US$3 million to the United Nations Relief and Works Agency for Palestine Refugees in the Near East.

== Special loans ==
China-Arab states special loans are two special credit lines established by China in announcements in 2016 and 2018 in the amount of US$15 billion and $20 billion respectively. Both announcements were made in speeches given by CCP General Secretary Xi Jinping that called for jointly building the Belt and Road Initiative, China's global economic connectivity plan.

=== 2016 special loan ===
The $15 billion special loan for infrastructure and manufacturing was announced in January 2016 during a visit by Xi Jinping at the Arab League. The loan program in 2016 was announced as part of a larger financial package that had a heavy emphasis on business and investment. In addition to the $15 billion special credit line, US$10 billion of commercial loans and US$10 billion of concessional loans (foreign aid loans) were announced. The launch in December 2015 of the $10 billion UAE-China Joint Investment Fund was also noted.

=== 2018 special loan ===
During the China-Arab States Cooperation Forum in Beijing in July 2018, Xi Jinping announced the $20 billion special loan for "economic reconstruction."

The 2018 announcement took on a different tone from the one in 2016 with pledges of help for reconstruction of war torn countries. The $20 billion special credit line was paired with a 600 million yuan humanitarian and reconstruction aid for Syria, Yemen, Jordan and Lebanon and a further 1 billion yuan was offered to support "social stability efforts". Also announced in 2018 was a China-Arab Countries Interbank Association with $3 billion in funding from China Development Bank for interbank credits with local banks in the region.

== Timeline of summits ==
Foreign ministers of CASCF member states meet every two years, either in China or in an Arab state. CASCF also has ten subgroups, including the China-Arab Relations and China-Arab Civilization Dialogue, which also usually meet every two years. On an annual basis, senior officials from CASCF member states meet to implement CASCF action plans.

=== Summits ===
- 2004: 1st meeting in Cairo. Declaration of the China-Arab State Cooperation Forum.
- 2006: 2nd meeting in Beijing. Joint Communiqué on Environmental Protection.
- 2008: 3rd meeting in Manama.
- 2010: 4th meeting in Tianjin.
- 2012: 5th meeting in Hammamet. The action plan following the 5th meeting focused on political cooperation, economics, social engagement, and educational engagement. Egyptian delegates sought China's support for internal Arab state security concerns, but the meeting occurred in the midst of the Arab Spring and security cooperation was generally de-emphasized during the 5th meeting.
- 2014: 6th meeting in Beijing. Energy security was the primary topic of the 6th meeting, followed by emphasis on infrastructure development and trade. Other significant topics included nuclear power, aerospace, satellites, and development of energy sources. Chinese leader Xi Jinping articulated a cooperation framework through which civil nuclear power plants were described as a new frontier for collaboration between China and the Arab States. The 2014 Declaration and ten-year plan discuss the "Silk Road Economic Belt" and "21st Century Maritime Silk Road," references that pre-date the official beginning of the Belt and Road Initiative (BRI).
- 2016: 7th meeting in Doha. This meeting emphasized China-Arab state economic development, including joint development of the BRI. The 2016 Declaration and ten-year plan expand the scope of BRI cooperation between China and the Arab states to include nuclear energy, satellites, "new energy and Arab capacity strengthening." PRC Foreign Minister Wang Yi also emphasized that the development of ports and railways were an important part of exchanges between China and the Arab countries. CASCF countries signed a declaration which expressed appreciation for China's efforts to resolve its maritime and territorial disputes through dialogue and negotiation. The declaration also stated that the United Nations Convention on the Law of the Sea signatories should have the right to choose their own approach to resolving maritime issues. The declaration supported China's position on island building in the South China Sea.
- 2018: 8th meeting in Beijing. The 8th meeting focused on the BRI. China pledged $20 billion in economic development loans and $3 billion in loans for Arab country financial sectors. The action plan following the meeting discussed preserving Arab countries' sovereignty and stability based on principles of non-interference and the Community of Shared Future for Mankind.
- 2022: 1st meeting of China-Arab States Summit
- 2023: 9th meeting in Chengdu. The meeting summarized the progress of work since the First China-Arab States Summit and the Ninth Ministerial Conference of the Forum, conducted in-depth exchanges on the implementation of the outcomes of the China-Arab Summits, the promotion of China-Arab practical cooperation in various fields, the strengthening of the Forum, etc., and put forward suggestions on the initiatives for the next stage of work.
- 2024: 10th meeting in Beijing. Chinese leader Xi Jinping will attend the opening ceremony of the conference and deliver a keynote speech.
