= 2022 China-Arab States Summit =

1st China-Arab States Summit

- Host country: Saudi Arabia
- Date: 9 December 2022
- Cities: Riyadh
- Participants: Algeria; Bahrain; China; Comoros; Djibouti; Egypt; Iraq; Jordan; Kuwait; Lebanon; Libya; Mauritania; Morocco; Oman; Palestine; Qatar; Saudi Arabia; Somalia; Sudan; Tunisia; United Arab Emirates; Yemen

The 2022 China-Arab States Summit was the 1st summit of the heads of state and representatives of 21 countries of the Arab League, and the head of state of the People's Republic of China. It was held on 9 December 2022, in Riyadh, Saudi Arabia.

== Preparation ==
In March 2021, the 155th session of the League of Arab States Council at the level of foreign ministers adopted a resolution on strengthening relations with China, one of the key elements of which was to once again welcome the Kingdom of Saudi Arabia's hosting of the inaugural Arab-China Summit.

In December 2022, the Ministry of Foreign Affairs issued a report on China-Arab Cooperation in the New Era, which stated that China is willing to take the convening of the first China-Arab Summit as an opportunity to build a China-Arab community of destiny facing the new era together with Arab countries, and to jointly safeguard the cause of world peace and development.

On December 7, 2022, Foreign Ministry spokeswoman Hua Chunying announced that at the invitation of King Salman of Saudi Arabia, General Secretary of the Chinese Communist Party Xi Jinping will go to Riyadh, Saudi Arabia, from December 7 to 10 to attend the first China-Arab Summit, the summit of the China-Gulf Cooperation Council for the Arab States, and pay a state visit to Saudi Arabia.

== Participating leaders ==
In addition to the visiting General Secretary of the Chinese Communist Party, Xi Jinping, the participating leaders were Crown Prince and Prime Minister Mohammed bin Salman Al Saud of Saudi Arabia, President Abdel Fattah el-Sisi of Egypt, King Abdullah II bin Al-Hussein of Jordan, King Hamad bin Isa bin Salman Al Khalif of Bahrain, Crown Prince Mishal Al-Ahmad Al-Jaber Al-Sabah of Kuwait, President Kais Saied of Tunisia, President Ismail Omar Guelleh of Djibouti, President Mahmoud Abbas of Palestine, Emir Sheikh Tamim bin Hamad Al Thani of Qatar, President Azali Assoumani of Comoros, President Mohamed Ould Ghazouani of Mauritania, Prime Minister Mohammed Shia' Al Sudani of Iraq, Prime Minister Aziz Akhannouch of Morocco, Prime Minister Aïmene Benabderrahmane of Algeria, and Prime Minister Najib Mikati of Lebanon, as well as Secretary-General Ahmed Aboul Gheit of the Arab League and heads of other international organizations.

== Meeting ==
On the afternoon of December 7, 2022, Xi Jinping arrived in Riyadh. On December 9, the first China-Arab Summit was held at the King Abdulaziz International Convention Center in the Riyadh. Xi Jinping attended the summit and delivered a keynote speech. At the first China-Arab Summit, Xi proposed "eight common actions" for China-Arab practical cooperation. The summit issued the Riyadh Declaration of the First China-Arab Summit, announcing that China and the Arab countries agreed to make every effort to build a China-Arab community of destiny for the new era. The Summit issued the Outline of the Comprehensive Cooperation Program between the People's Republic of China and the Arab States and the Document on Deepening the Sino-Arab Strategic Partnership for Peace and Development.

On the morning of Dec. 10, Xi Jinping departed for his home country after attending the China-Arab Summit, the China-Gulf Arab States Cooperation Council Summit and paying a state visit to Saudi Arabia.

== See also ==
- China–Arab States Cooperation Forum
