= United States–Africa Leaders Summit 2022 =

International summit held in Washington DC

US–Africa Leaders Summit 2022
- Host country: United States
- Date: December 13–15, 2022
- Cities: Washington, D.C.
- Venues: Salamander Washington DC Hotel; White House; Harry S Truman Building; Walter E. Washington Convention Center; National Museum of African American History and Culture
- Participants: Joe Biden; 49 African leaders U.S. Business Executives
- Follows: United States–Africa Leaders Summit 2014
- Website: Official website

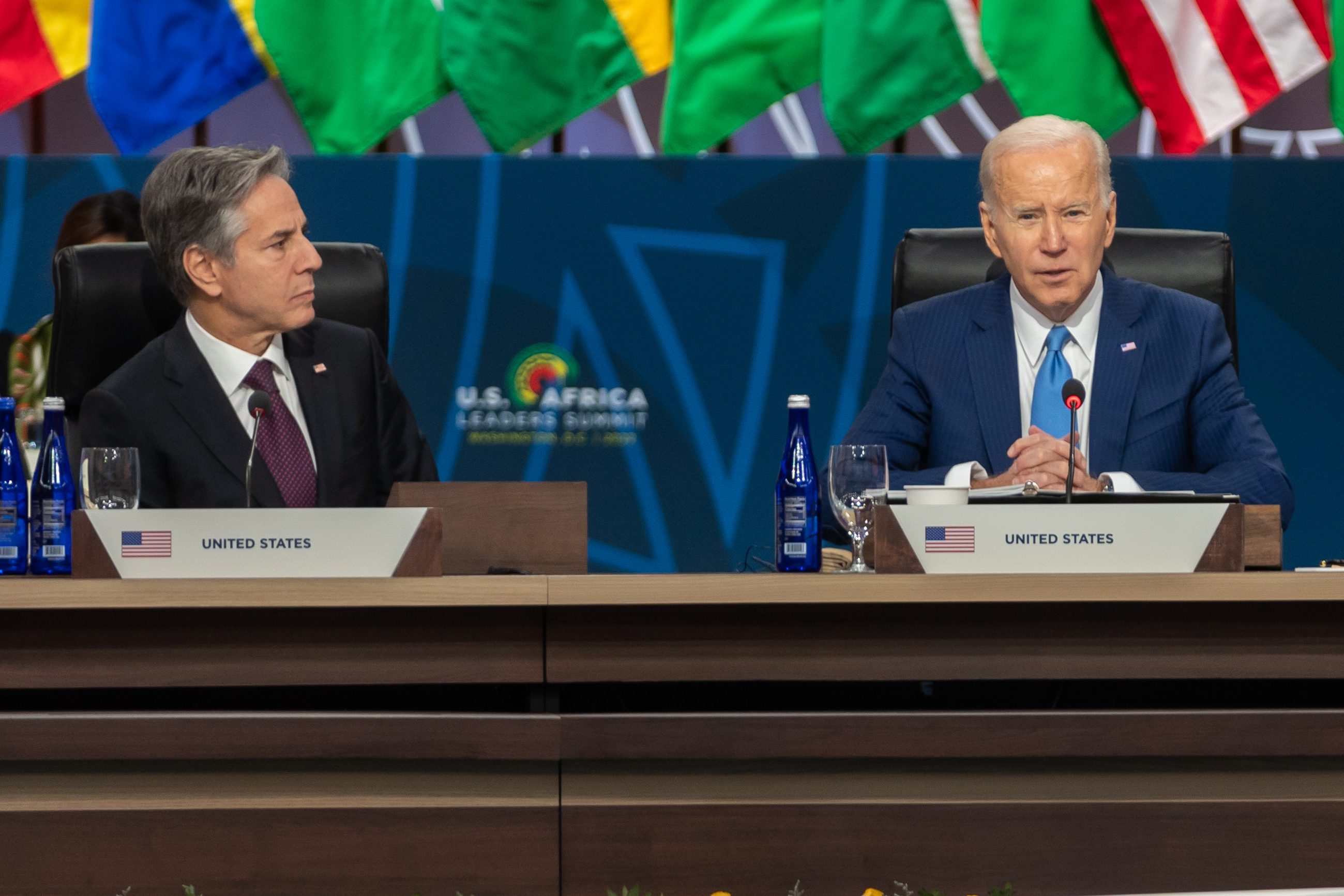
Biden delivers remarks

The United States–Africa Leaders Summit 2022 was an international summit held in Washington, D.C., from December 13–15, 2022. The summit was hosted by United States President Joe Biden, and attended by leaders from 49 African states, as well as the head of the African Union Commission.

The event's overall goal was to rebuild and strengthen relations between the United States and African countries. Specifically, the summit focused on issues relating to health, climate change, food security, conflicts, and cooperation in space.

== Background ==
The first United States–Africa Leaders Summit was held in 2014 by United States President Barack Obama. In July 2022, Biden announced that he would hold a second summit. Under the administration of his predecessor, Donald Trump, foreign policy emphasis was shifted away from Africa. In addition, the influence of other powers, such as China, grew significantly on the continent during the years preceding the second summit.

== Schedule ==
=== Day 1 ===
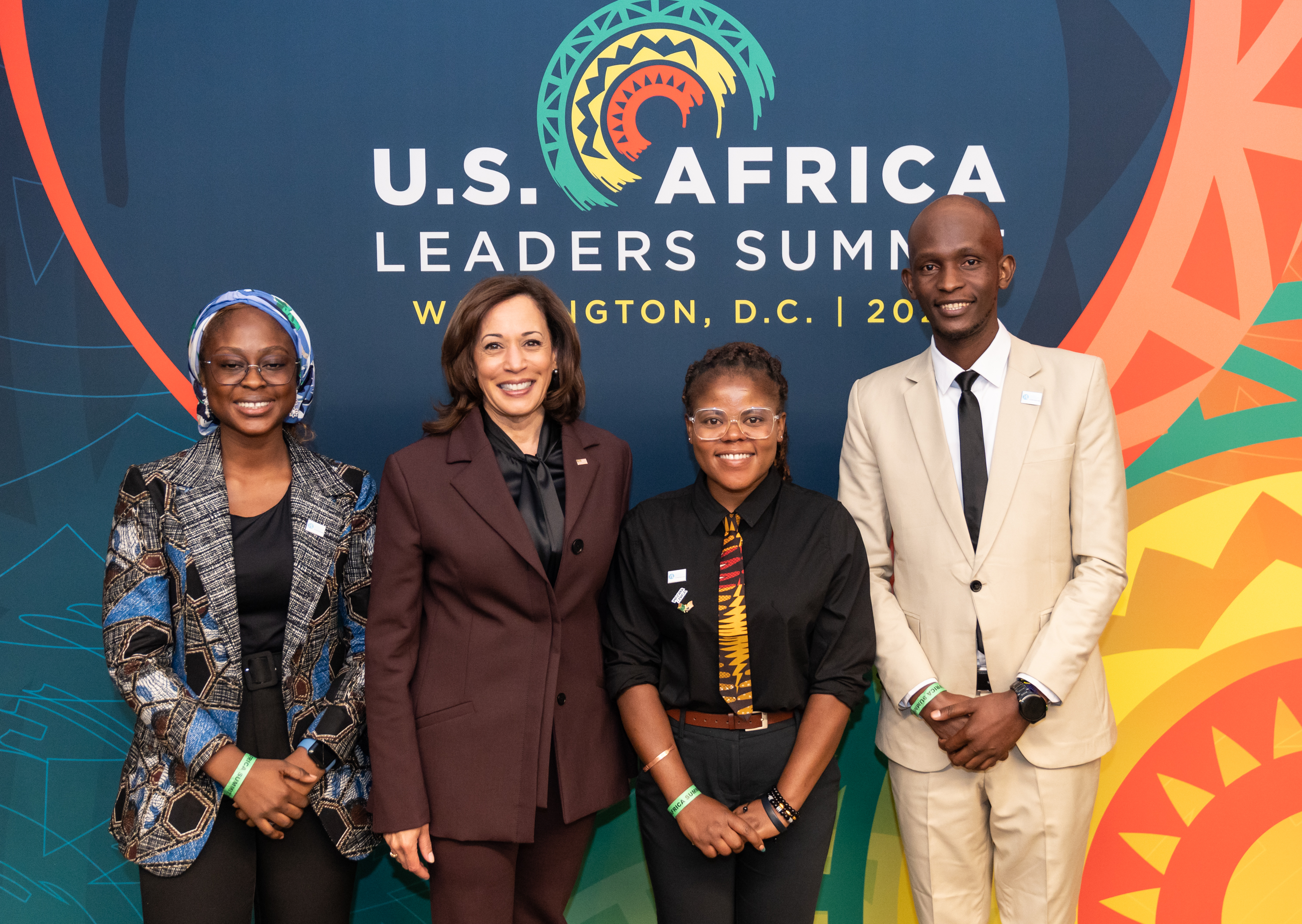
Vice President Harris at the African and Diaspora Young Leaders Forum

Sub-forums on the summit topics were held on the first day.

- African and Diaspora Young Leaders Forum
- Civil Society Forum
- African Growth and Opportunity Act (AGOA) Trade Ministerial
- U.S. Africa Space Forum
- Peace, Security, and Governance Forum
- Partnering for Sustainable Health Cooperation
- Conservation, Climate Adaptation, and a Just Energy Transition

=== Day 2 ===
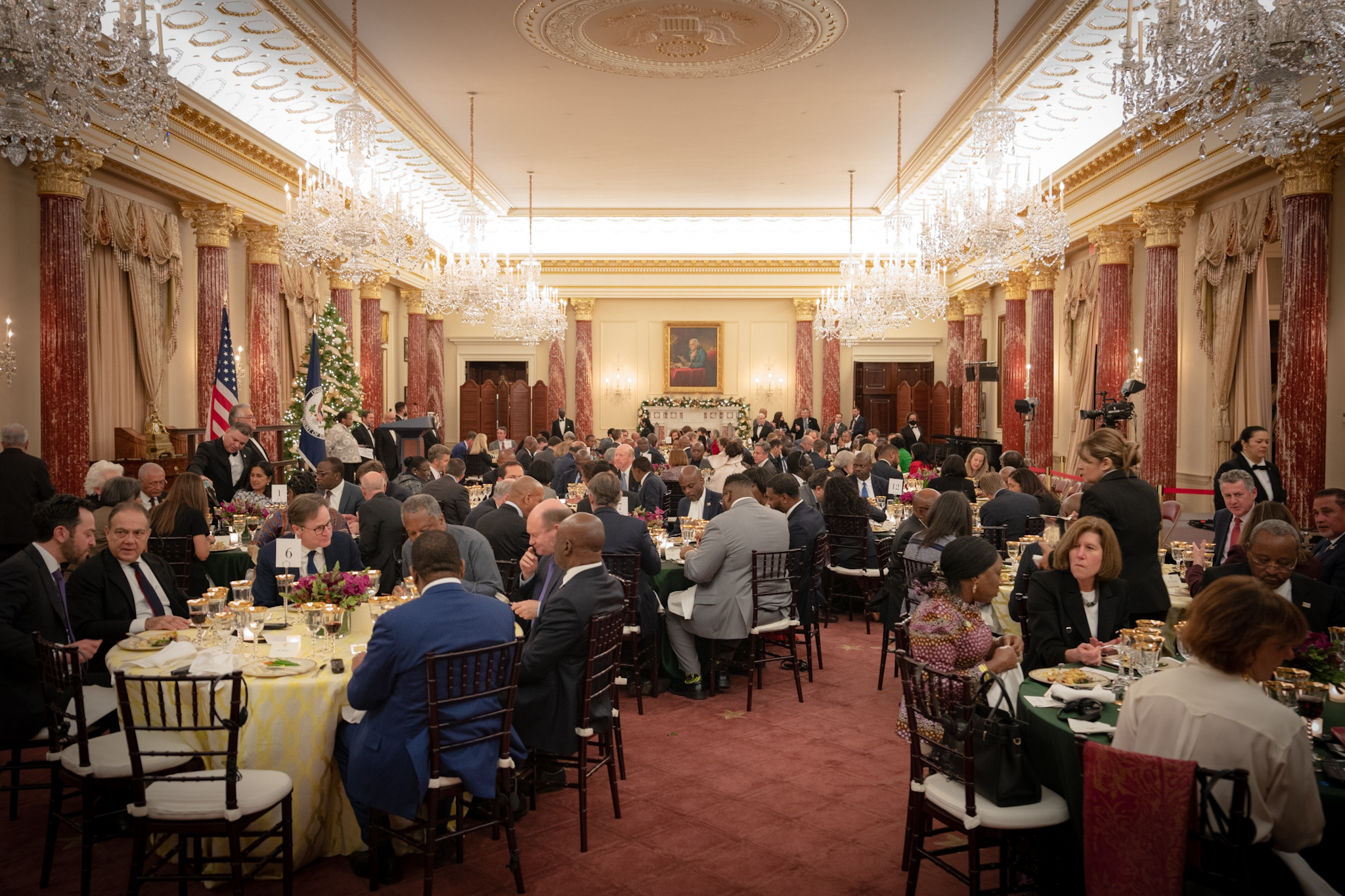
The foreign ministers dinner

The U.S.-Africa Business Forum was held on the second day, consisting of four sessions.

- Charting the Course: The Future of U.S.-Africa Trade & Investment Relations
- Building a Sustainable Future: Partnerships to Finance African Infrastructure and the Energy Transition
- Growing Agribusiness: Partnerships to Strengthen Food Security and Value Chain
- Advancing Digital Connectivity: Partnerships to Enable Inclusive Growth Through Technology

After the forum, President Joe Biden delivered a keynote address, and joined leaders at a state dinner.

=== Day 3 ===
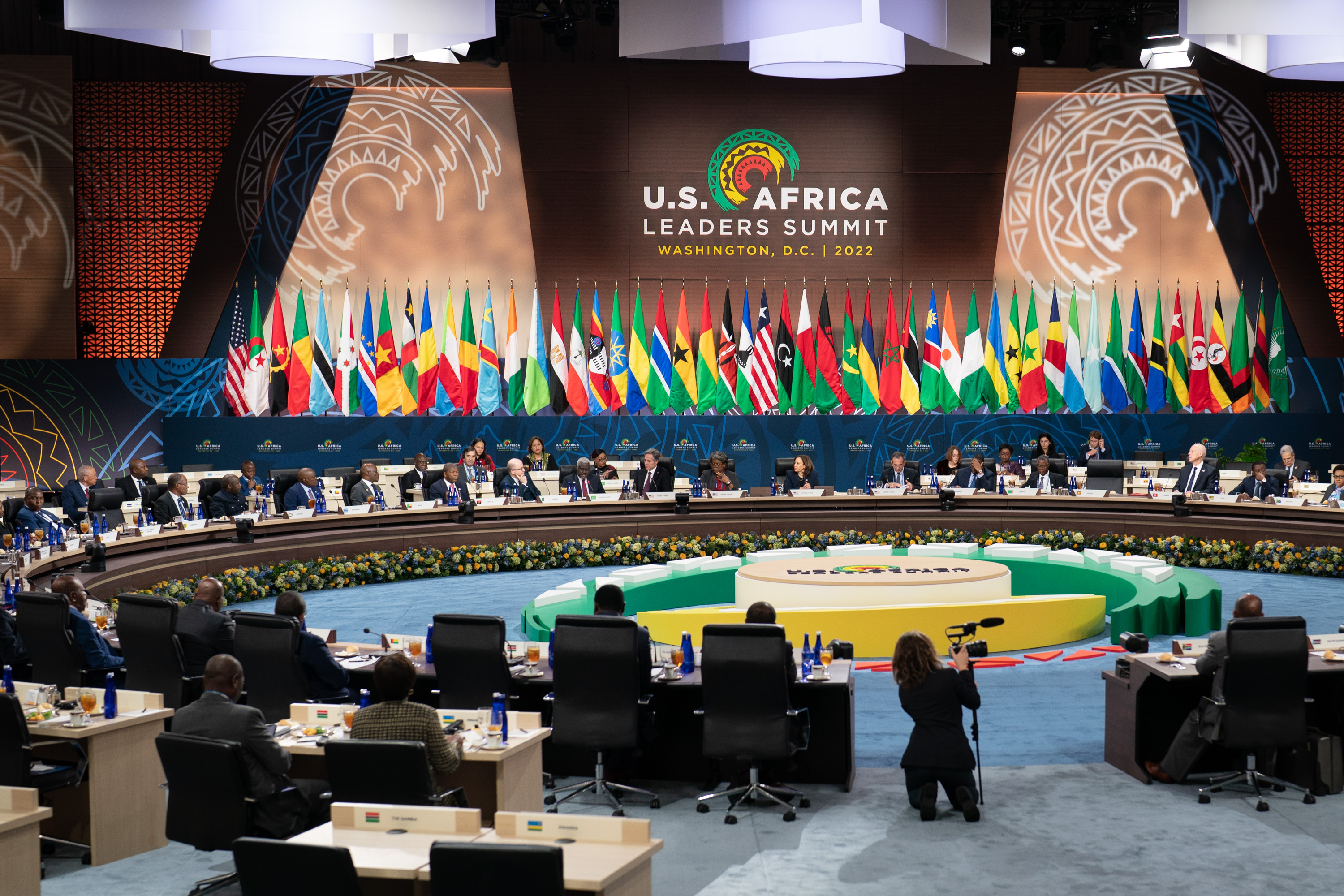
The working lunch at the Leaders Summit

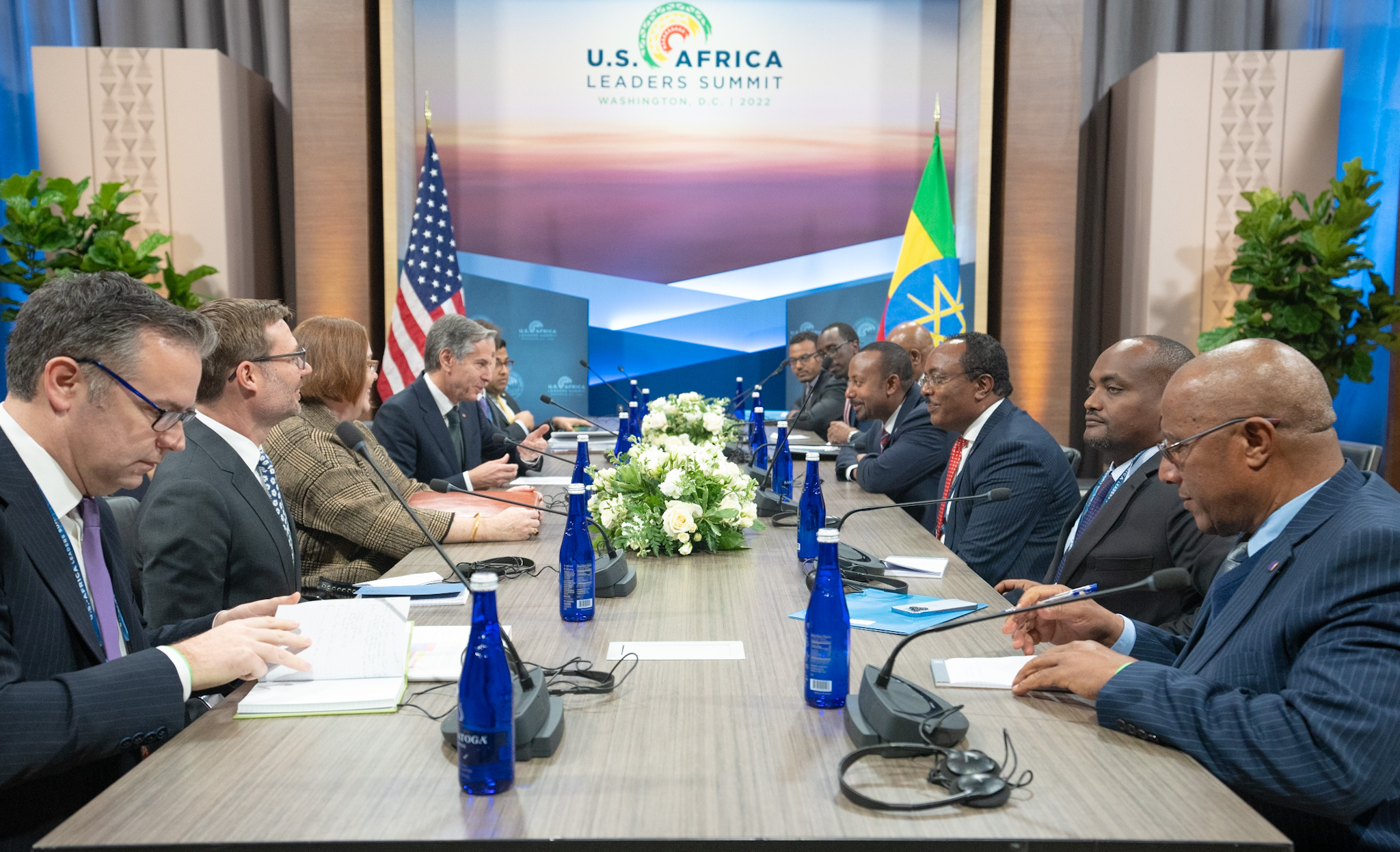
Blinken with Ethiopia's Prime Minister Abiy Ahmed

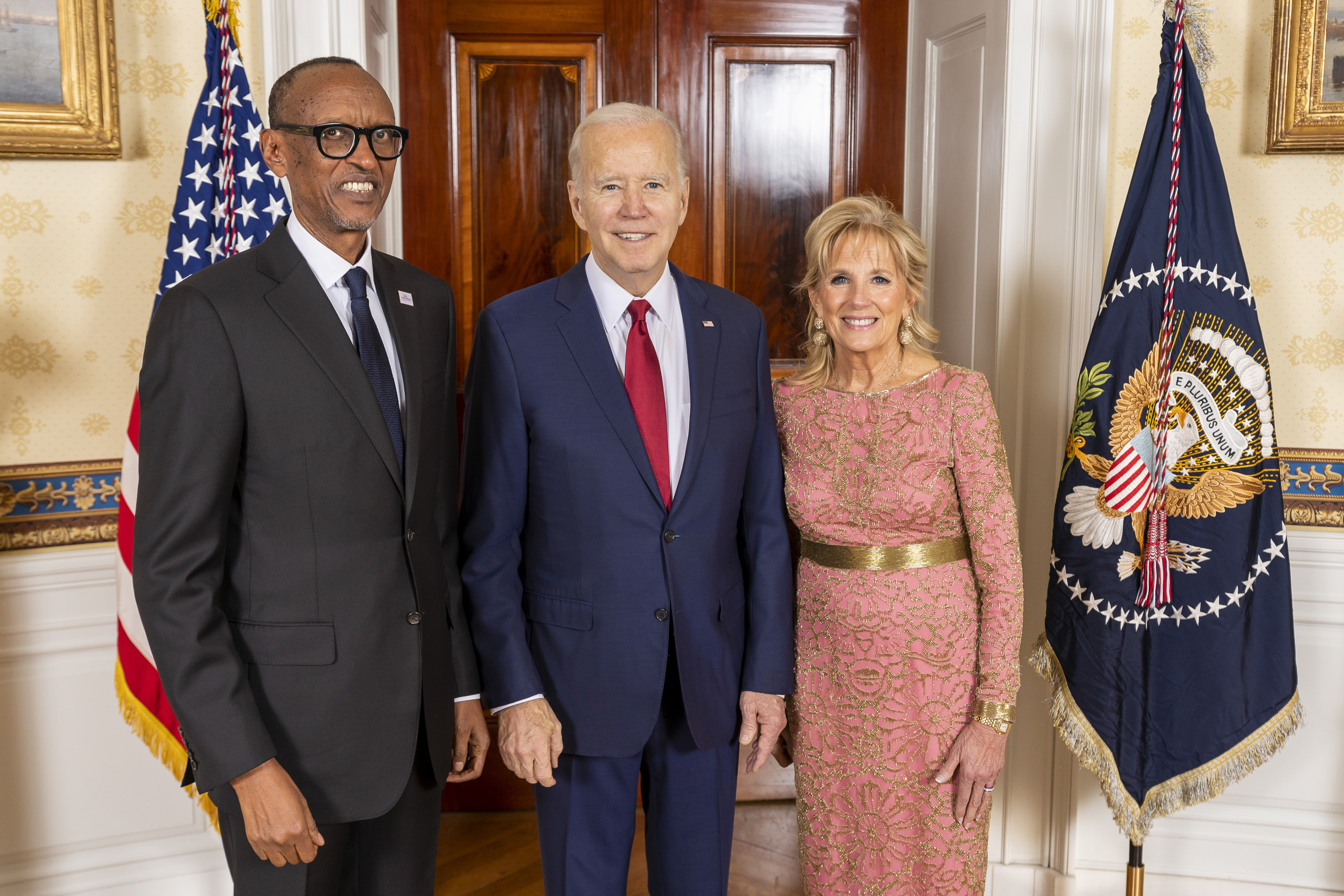
President Joe Biden with Rwanda's President Paul Kagame

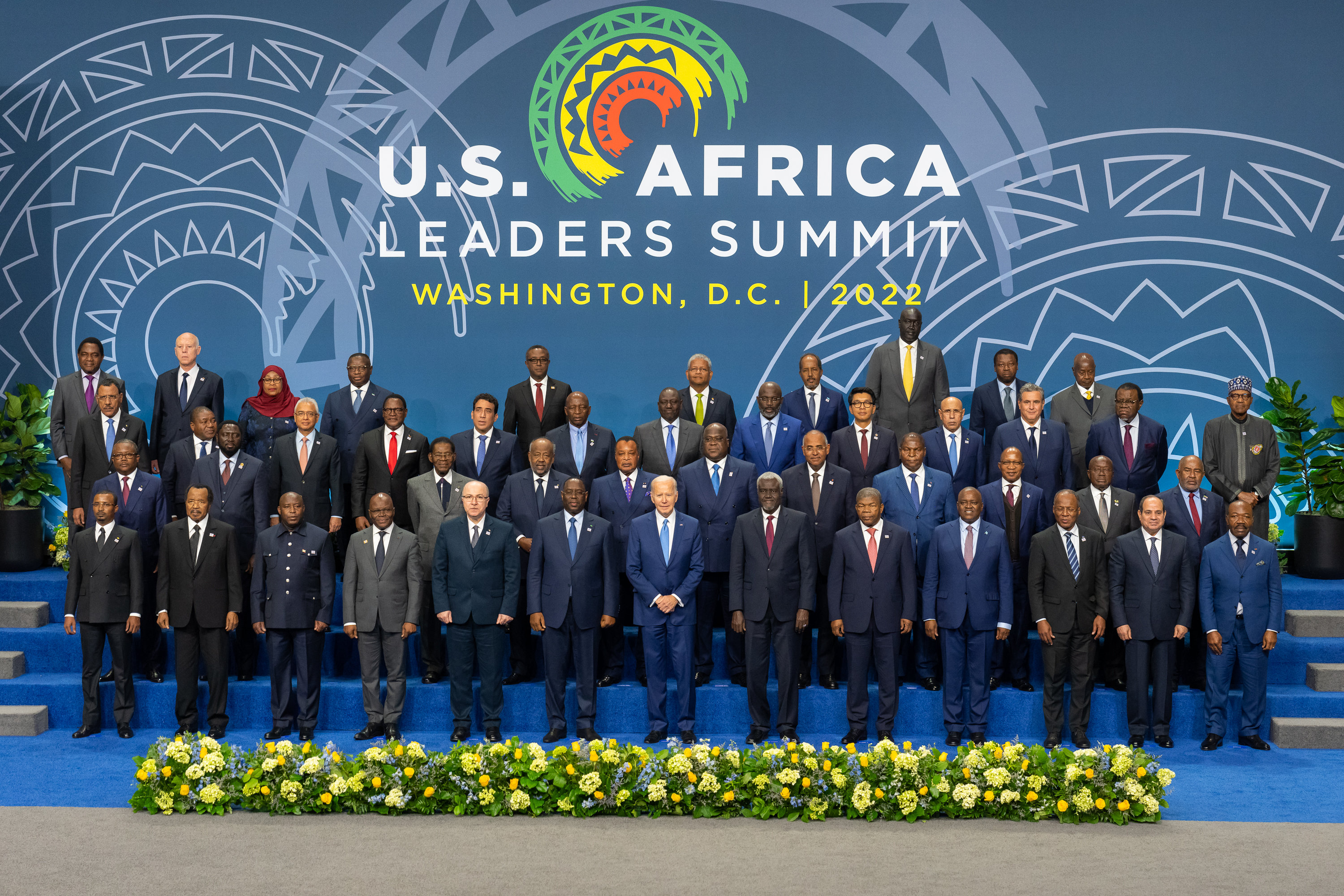
President Biden with African leaders

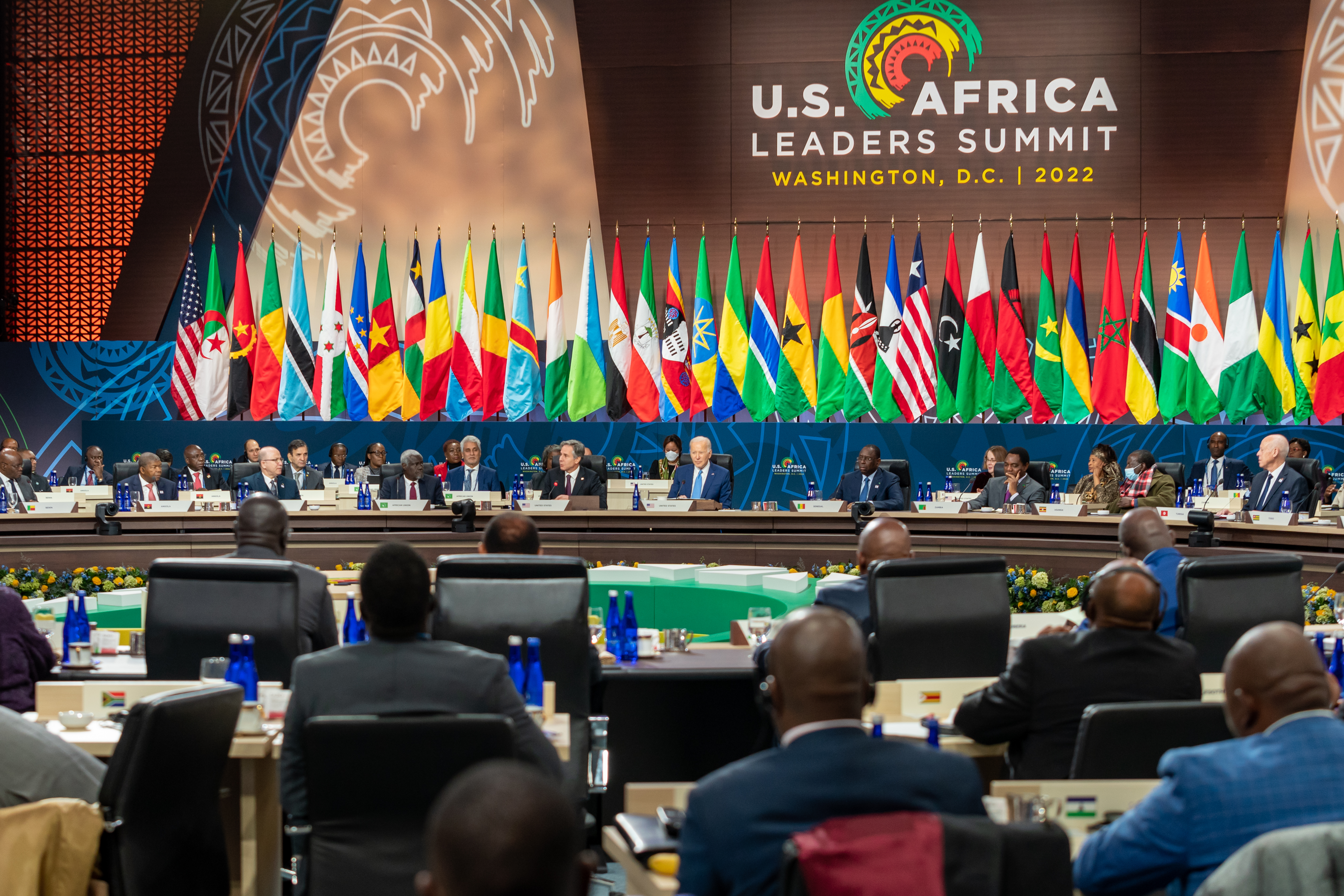
Biden and Blinken at the Leaders Summit

The leaders sessions and a working lunch were held on the final day.

- Leaders Session – Partnering on Agenda 2063
  - Discussion Session 1: "An Africa of good governance, democracy, respect for human rights, justice, and the rule of law"
  - Discussion Session 2: "A peaceful and secure Africa"
  - Discussion Session 3: "A prosperous Africa based on inclusive growth and sustainable development"
- Leaders Working Lunch – Multilateral Partnerships with Africa to Meet Global Challenges
- Leaders Session – Promoting Food Security and Food Systems Resilience

A "family photo" was taken between the working lunch and the final session.

== Participants ==
At the time of the summit, there were 54 fully recognized states in Africa. All 54 were members of the African Union, though membership had been suspended for 4 of these, due to recent coups in those countries. Invitations were extended to 49 of the remaining 50 that were "in good standing" with the African Union.

The African Union was also invited. All invitations were accepted. All but 4 of the invited countries sent heads of state or heads of government. Biden met with the leaders as a group, and did not sit down with any of them individually.

=== Dignitaries ===
Country	Title	Leader
Algeria	Prime Minister	Aïmene Benabderrahmane
Angola	President	João Lourenço
Benin	President	Patrice Talon
Botswana	President	Mokgweetsi Masisi
Burundi	President	Évariste Ndayishimiye
Cape Verde	Prime Minister	Ulisses Correia e Silva
Cameroon	President	Paul Biya
Central African Republic	President	Faustin-Archange Touadéra
Chad	President	Mahamat Déby
Comoros	President	Azali Assoumani
Congo–Brazzaville	President	Denis Sassou Nguesso
Côte D'Ivoire	Prime Minister	Patrick Achi
Djibouti	President	Ismaïl Omar Guelleh
DR Congo	President	Félix Tshisekedi
Egypt	President	Abdel Fattah el-Sisi
Equatorial Guinea	President	Teodoro Obiang Nguema Mbasogo
Eswatini	Prime Minister	Cleopas Dlamini
Ethiopia	Prime Minister	Abiy Ahmed
Gabon	President	Ali Bongo Ondimba
Gambia	Minister of Foreign Affairs	Mamadou Tangara
Ghana	President	Nana Akufo-Addo
Guinea-Bissau	President	Umaro Sissoco Embaló
Kenya	President	William Ruto
Lesotho	Prime Minister	Sam Matekane
Liberia	President	George Weah
Libya	President of the Presidential Council	Mohamed al-Menfi
Madagascar	President	Andry Rajoelina
Malawi	President	Lazarus Chakwera
Mauritania	President	Mohamed Ould Ghazouani
Mauritius	Prime Minister	Pravind Jugnauth
Morocco	Prime Minister	Aziz Akhannouch
Mozambique	President	Filipe Nyusi
Namibia	President	Hage Geingob
Niger	President	Mohamed Bazoum
Nigeria	President	Muhammadu Buhari
Rwanda	President	Paul Kagame
São Tomé and Príncipe	Prime Minister	Patrice Trovoada
Senegal	President	Macky Sall
Seychelles	President	Wavel Ramkalawan
Sierra Leone	President	Julius Maada Bio
Somalia	President	Hassan Sheikh Mohamud
South Africa	Minister for International Relations	Naledi Pandor
South Sudan	Minister of Foreign Affairs	Mayiik Ayii Deng
Tanzania	President	Samia Suluhu Hassan
Togo	President	Faure Gnassingbe
Tunisia	President	Kais Saied
Uganda	President	Yoweri Museveni
Zambia	President	Hakainde Hichilema
Zimbabwe	Minister of Foreign Affairs	Frederick Shava (Note: Shava received the invitation to the summit instead of Zimbabwe President Emmerson Mnangagwa, as the latter was under U.S. sanctions.)

=== Non-attendance ===
Country	Title	Leader
Algeria	President	Abdelmadjid Tebboune
Côte D'Ivoire	President	Alassane Ouattara
Eswatini	King	Mswati III
Gambia	President	Adama Barrow
Lesotho	King	Letsie III
Morocco	King	Mohammed VI
South Africa	President	Cyril Ramaphosa
South Sudan	President	Salva Kiir

- African Union – Chairperson of the African Union Commission – Moussa Faki Mahamat

=== Excluded countries ===
- Burkina Faso – President Ibrahim Traoré membership in African Union suspended
- Eritrea – President Isaias Afwerki limited diplomatic relations with United States
- Guinea – President Mamady Doumbouya membership in African Union suspended
- Mali – President Assimi Goïta membership in African Union suspended
- Sahrawi Republic – President Brahim Ghali was not recognized by the United States and has no diplomatic relations
- Sudan – President or Head of State Abdel Fattah al-Burhan membership in African Union suspended
