= 2022 Arab League summit =

Meeting of Arab regional organization

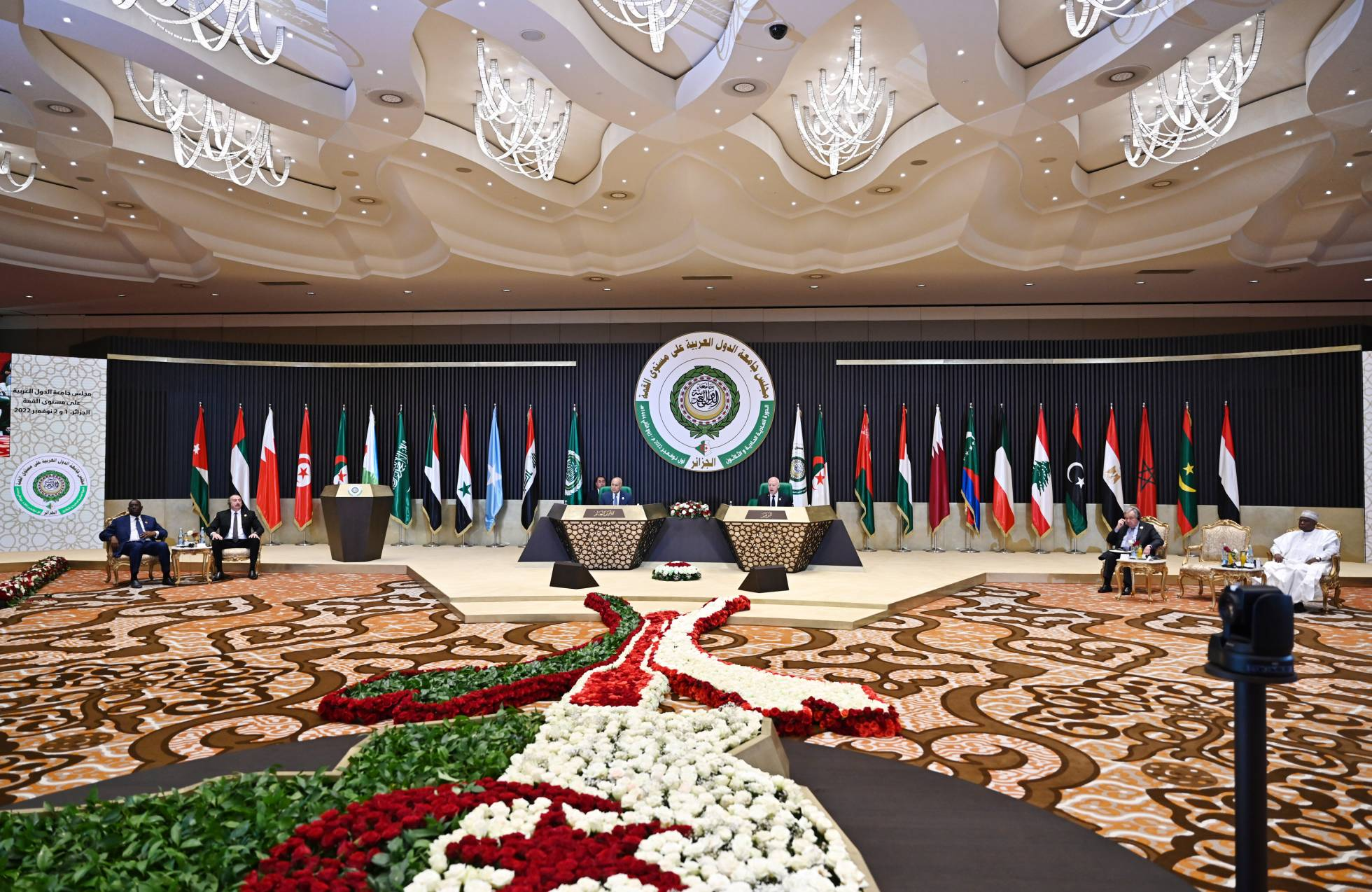
- Host country: Algeria
- Date: 1–2&3* November 2022
- Motto: Reunification
- Cities: Algiers
- Venues: International Conference Center
- Participants: 21 countries
- Chair: Abdelmadjid Tebboune
- Follows: 2019 Arab League summit
- Precedes: 2023 Arab League summit
- Website: www.arabsummit2022.dz

The 2022 Arab League summit, officially the 31st Ordinary Session of the Council of the League of Arab States at the Summit Level, was held at its 31st session in Algiers. This was the fourth time the city hosted this event. All Arab countries were represented at the event, with the exception of Syria, which has been suspended since 2011 due to the ongoing crisis. The summit was postponed several times before its date was confirmed on 1 November 2022. It was initially to be held in 2020, 2021 and finally March 2022. But due to the COVID-19 pandemic, it was postponed to November to coincide with the anniversary of the outbreak of the Algerian Revolution. The summit was also the first since a number of countries normalized relations with Israel, causing a schism in the Arab position, which had remained united over what was stipulated in the Beirut 2002 initiative.

The King of Saudi Arabia, the Crown Prince of Saudi Arabia, the President of the UAE, the Emir of Kuwait, the King of Bahrain, the King of Morocco, the Crown Prince of Morocco and the Sultan of Oman with the Crown Prince of Oman did not attend the summit.

== Participation ==
- Arab League – Secretary-General Ahmed Aboul Gheit
- Algeria – President Abdelmadjid Tebboune (host)
- Bahrain – Special Representative of the King, Mohammed bin Mubarak Al Khalifa
- Comoros – President Azali Assoumani
- Djibouti – President Ismaïl Omar Guelleh
- Egypt – President Abdel Fattah el-Sisi
- Iraq – President Abdul Latif Rashid
- Jordan – Crown Prince Hussein bin Abdullah
- Kuwait – Crown Prince Mishal Al-Ahmad Al-Jaber Al-Sabah
- Lebanon – Prime Minister Najib Mikati
- Libya – Chairman of the Presidential Council Mohamed al-Menfi
- Morocco – Foreign Minister Nasser Bourita
- Mauritania – President Mohamed Ould Ghazouani
- Oman – Deputy Prime Minister Asa'ad bin Tariq
- Palestine – President Mahmoud Abbas
- Qatar – Emir Tamim bin Hamad Al Thani
- Saudi Arabia – Foreign Minister Faisal bin Farhan Al Saud
- Somalia – President Hassan Sheikh Mohamud
- Sudan – Chairman Abdel Fattah al-Burhan
- Tunisia – President Kais Saied
- United Arab Emirates – Prime Minister Mohammed bin Rashid Al Maktoum
- Yemen – Chairman of the Presidential Leadership Council Rashad al-Alimi

Guests

- United Nations – Secretary-General António Guterres
- African Union – Chairperson Macky Sall
- Speaker of the Arab Parliament Adel Al Asoomi
- Organisation of Islamic Cooperation – Secretary General Hissein Brahim Taha
- Non-Aligned Movement – Secretary General Ilham Aliyev

=== Syria ===
There was a wide discussion about the possibility of Syria attending the summit, but due to the refusal of some influential countries in the League, this did not happen. Algeria was among the countries that demanded the invitation of Damascus.

== Agenda ==
- The Palestinian cause
- The crises in Syria, Libya and Yemen
- The Russo-Ukrainian war and its aftermath
- Terrorism and its impact on the region
- Arab food security
- Energy crisis
- Turkish and Iranian interference
- Arab League reform

== Outcomes ==
The leaders concurred in the final declaration to support Palestine's application for full membership in the UN and to welcome the announcement of reconciliation made by the Palestinian factions in mid-October. The summit placed a strong emphasis on enhancing cooperative Arab action to safeguard Arab national security in all areas and help some Arab nations out of their crises while maintaining their sovereignty, territorial integrity, and unity while also satisfying their populations' needs for a decent standard of living.
