= 2023 France–China Summit =

Meeting between Emmanuel Macron, Ursula von der Leyen, and Xi Jinping

2023 France–China summit 2023年法中国事访问
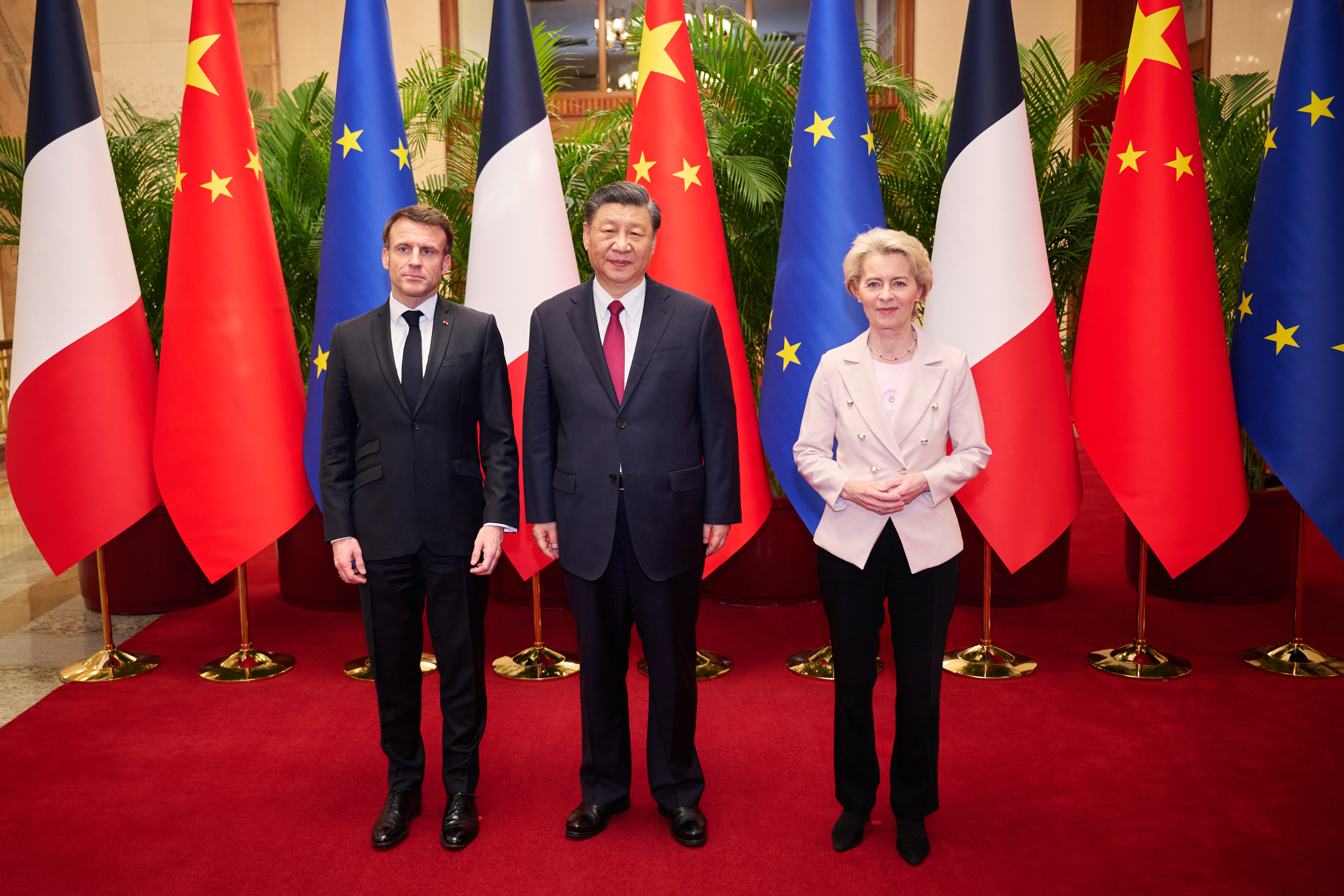
- Macron, Xi, and von der Leyen in 2023
- Host country: China
- Date: April 5–7, 2023
- Venues: Great Hall of the People, Beijing; Guangzhou, Guangdong
- Participants: Emmanuel Macron, President of France (European Union) Ursula von der Leyen, President of the European Commission; Xi Jinping, CCP General Secretary & President of China

Key points

From April 5 to 7, 2023, Emmanuel Macron, the President of France, undertook a three-day state visit to China. It was Macron's first visit to China since the COVID-19 pandemic and his third since taking office in 2017. He was accompanied by a delegation of more than 50 CEOs and met with members of the French business community in China. He also met with Xi Jinping, the General Secretary of the Chinese Communist Party and President of China, and Ursula von der Leyen, the President of the European Commission, to discuss various issues. By recalling the solid foundation of China-France relations and the friendship between the two peoples, the two heads of state had an in-depth exchange of views on bilateral relations, China-EU relations and major international and regional issues, especially the ongoing Russian invasion of Ukraine and China's potential role as a mediator between Russia and the West. The visit was seen as an attempt to "reconnect" with China after three years of its zero-Covid policy and despite Beijing's increasing benevolence to Russia in the context of the Russo-Ukrainian war.

== Background ==
Macron had visited China twice before, in January 2018 and November 2019. During his first visit, he announced a "comprehensive strategic partnership" between France and China and signed several agreements on trade, climate change, nuclear energy and culture. He also presented Xi with a horse named Vesuvius as a gift. During his second visit, he attended the China International Import Expo in Shanghai and met with Xi in Beijing. He also invited Xi to visit France for the 60th anniversary of diplomatic relations between the two countries in 2024. However, since then, the relations between China and France, as well as between China and the European Union, have been strained by several factors. The outbreak of the COVID-19 pandemic in early 2020, which was first identified in China, led to Beijing effectively shutting its borders to travel and imposing strict quarantine measures on incoming visitors. This hampered the exchange of people and goods between China and other countries, including France.

== Visit ==
=== Beijing ===
Former French Prime Minister Jean-Pierre Raffarin, President of the Constitutional Council Laurent Fabius, a number of ministers and parliamentarians, as well as more than 60 heads of large enterprises and more than 20 cultural figures will accompany the delegation. Macron meets Chinese President Xi Jinping on April 6 and holds talks with new Chinese Premier Li Qiang. During the meeting, Li highlighted that China is willing to work with France to push the China-France comprehensive strategic partnership to a higher level. Macron stated that France supports China's development and is ready to strengthen cooperation with China in the fields of trade, agriculture, aviation, finance, nuclear energy, innovation, tourism and humanities.

Cultural exchanges were also an important part of Macron's trip. China and France have discussed they were willing to convene a new round of meetings of the mechanism for high-level cultural exchanges at an early date. Macron has invited French director Jean-Jacques Annaud, actress Gong Li and her husband, French electronic musician Jean-Michel Jarre and other cultural figures to accompany him on his visit to China. On the day of his arrival in Beijing, Macron inaugurated the opening ceremony of the "Sino-French Cultural Spring" festival. He appeared on stage with Huang Bo, the festival's publicity ambassador.

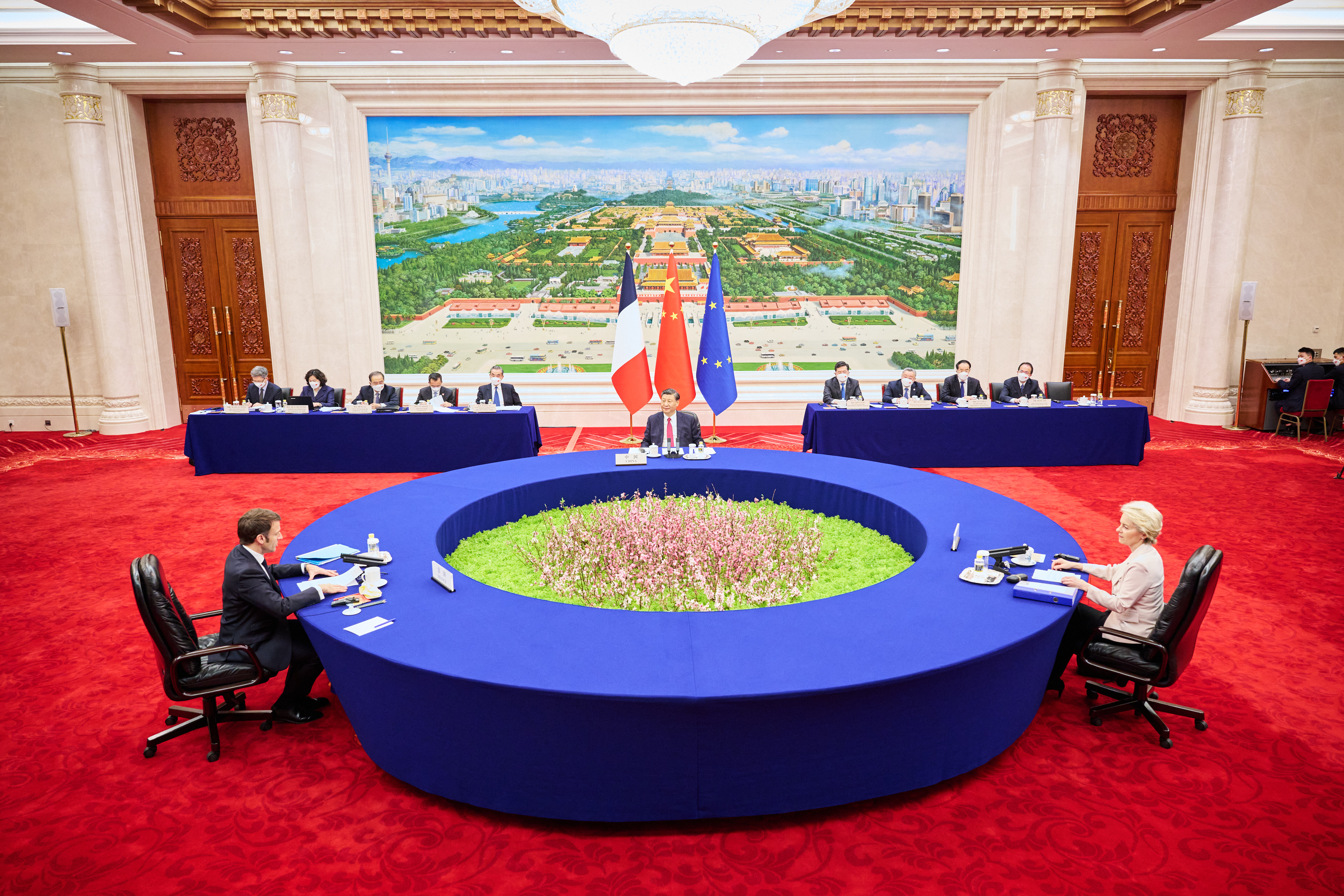
China-France-EU Talks at the Great Hall of the People in Beijing

In contrast to Macron's warm reception, European Commission President Ursula von der Leyen, who also visited China, was reportedly given a cold reception. On the afternoon of April 6, President Xi Jinping met with Von der Leyen at the Great Hall of the People. Xi stated that China and the EU should strengthen communication, establish correct mutual perceptions and avoid misunderstanding and miscalculation. Von der Leyen said the European Union totally disagreed with the idea of "delinking and breaking the chain" and hoped to strengthen communication and dialogue with the Chinese side and restart the three dialogue mechanisms. On the issue of Taiwan raised by von der Leyen, Xi emphasized that it was at the core of China's interests, and "anyone who expects China to compromise and back down on the Taiwan issue is delusional, and will only be lifting a rock and hitting his own foot."

=== Guangzhou ===
On April 7, President Emmanuel Macron visited Sun Yat-sen University, which became the first in Southern China to launch a French department in 1957. President Macron was warmly welcomed and entertained by the faculty and students.

On the afternoon of April 7, Xi held an informal meeting with Macron in Songyuan, Guangzhou City, Guangdong Province. Xi briefed Macron on the essential features and core tenets of Chinese-style modernization. Macron said that true friendship was mutual understanding and mutual respect. He indicated that France appreciated China's consistent support for France and Europe to adhere to independence, autonomy and unity, and was willing to respect each other's sovereignty and territorial integrity and other core interests, strengthen technical and industrial cooperation, open up bilateral markets, and strengthen scientific and technological cooperation, including in artificial intelligence.

On the evening of April 7, the two sides issued the Joint Declaration of the People's Republic of China and the French Republic, which included language on trade, nuclear war, the war in Ukraine, the food crisis, climate change, and the multilateral trading system.

== Outcomes ==
French business leaders, including Airbus and Alstom officials, accompanied Macron to the summit in China.

Plans for a new Airbus assembly line in China were announced by Macron during the summit. Airbus will add this second assembly line for A320 narrow-body aircraft at its plant in Tianjin, producing up to 75 A320 NEO family aircraft per month by 2026. In addition, China has purchased 150 A320 NEO aircraft and 10 A350 aircraft.

Électricité de France has renewed its global cooperation agreement with China General Nuclear Power Group, which has been in force since 2007, covering the design, construction and operation of nuclear power plants. The company has a joint venture with CGNPC to build the world's first European Pressurized Water Reactor Generation III nuclear power plant in Taishan, Guangdong.

CMA CGM has worked with COSCO and Shanghai Port Group to develop biofuels. The company has reached new agreements in China for the supply of bio-methanol and e-methanol and signed deals to build new ships in China.

GDF SUEZ signed a seawater desalination cooperation project with Wanhua Chemical Group and China Railway Shanghai Engineering Bureau Group, further expanding the cooperation between the three parties in the field of environmental protection. Alstom signed an agreement to supply electrical equipment for the Chengdu Metro. L'Oreal and Alibaba signed a three-year strategic cooperation agreement.

Soon after the summit, on 30 June, EU leaders unveiled a "de-risking" policy towards China which scaled back their unofficial "decoupling" policy, reflecting concerns about cutting off the world's second-largest economy and the potential economic damage caused by a trade war.

== See also ==
- 2023 Brazil–China summit
