= Brazil–China relations =

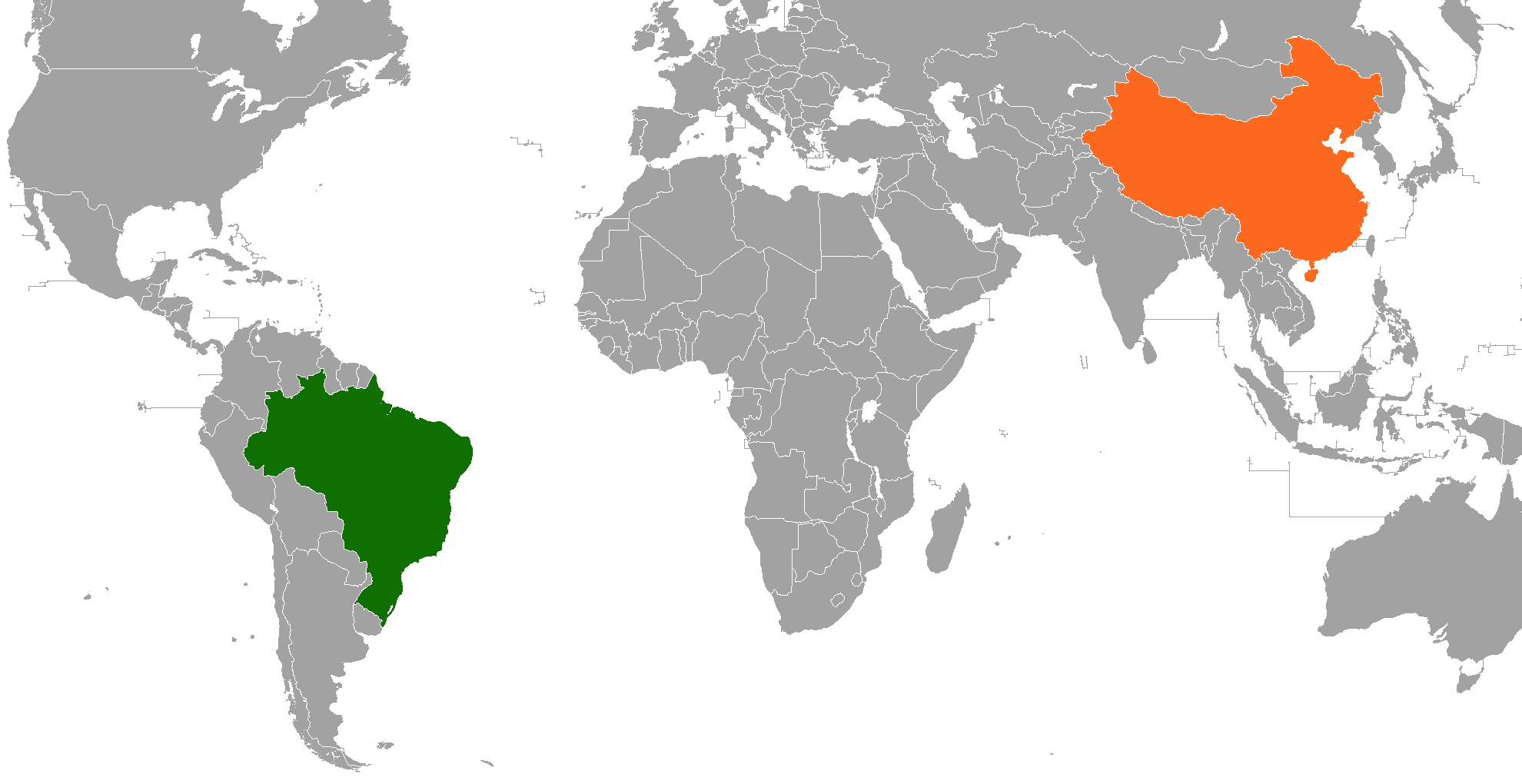
- Brazil: China

Diplomatic mission
- Embassy of Brazil, Beijing: Embassy of China, Brasilia

Envoy
- Ambassador Marcos Galvão: Ambassador Zhu Qingqiao

Brazil–China relations are the current and historical relationship between Brazil and China. Relations between Brazil and China began in the early nineteenth century and continued until 1949, when they were disrupted by the creation of the People's Republic of China (PRC). Diplomatic relations between the PRC and Brazil officially began in 1974 with agreement on the establishment and operation of Brazil's embassy in Beijing and China's embassy in Brasília. Both nations are members of BRICS, G20 and the United Nations.

== History ==
=== Early years ===
Early undertakings involving Brazil and China were mediated by the mutual participation of Brazil and Macao in the Portuguese Empire. The first of these connections dates to 1812, when Queen Maria I of Portugal, then based in Brazil, imported Chinese laborers to work on a tea plantation near Rio de Janeiro. In 1900, a fresh wave of immigrants from China settled in São Paulo.

In 1879, Admiral Arthur Silveira da Motta, Baron of Jaceguai and soon to be the first Brazilian envoy extraordinary and minister plenipotentiary in Beijing, led a "naval mission" to China to established diplomatic relations, while another mission was sent to London to discuss Chinese immigration with China's diplomats there. Formal relations between the Empire of Brazil and the Qing Dynasty were established in September 1880 with the Treaty of Friendship, Commerce and Navigation.

The Chinese refused, however, to permit Brazilians to hire Chinese as contract laborers, knowing that non-white laborers were treated "as machines or as cheap labour". The British were also opposed to the importation of Chinese labor to Brazil, believing it would inevitably result in de facto slavery. (Slavery in Brazil was only abolished in 1888.) Late in 1893, José de Costa Azevedo, Baron of Ladario, went to Beijing to negotiate a new treaty on immigration, but the Chinese were uninterested.

Formal relations with the Republic of China ended following the Chinese Civil War (1927–50) and were only re-established with the People's Republic of China in 1974.

In 1993, Brazil and China signed a strategic partnership.

=== 2000-present ===
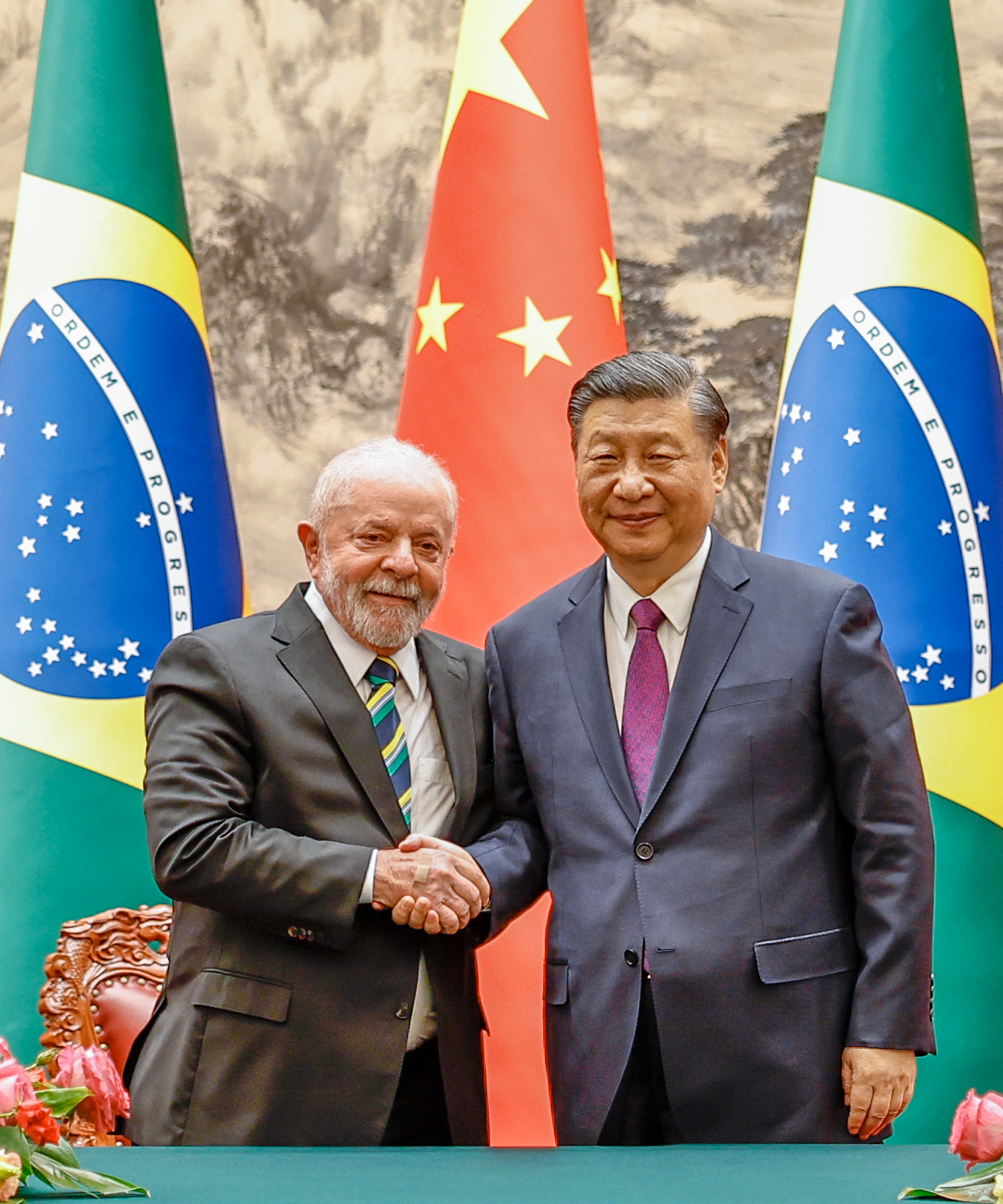
Brazilian President Luiz Inácio Lula da Silva and Chinese leader Xi Jinping during the 2023 Brazil-China summit, April 2023.

In 2010 the second BRIC summit was held in Brazil, with proposals made for increased cooperation between Brazil and China on political and trade related issues as well as energy, mining, financial services and agriculture.

In 2004, Brazil and China established the China-Brazil High-Level Commission for Coordination and Cooperation (COSBAN). COSBAN serves as the primary mechanism for high-level dialogue between the two countries, and COSBAN's dialogues have often focused on energy and climate change action.

In an address to the Brazilian Congress on November 12, 2004, Chinese leader Hu Jintao said that ‘both Latin America and China have similar experiences in gaining national liberation, defending national independence and constructing the country’. Therefore, ‘both sides have the same feelings and common languages’. He said that ‘China-Latin American relations were expected to support each other in the political fields, strengthen economic complementarily, and carry out close cultural contacts’.

In 2009, Lula stated Brazil's commitment to the One China principle that is the position held by the People's Republic of China and the ruling Chinese Communist Party (CCP), saying that the government of the People's Republic of China was the sole legal government representing the whole of China, including Taiwan—as part of China.

Between 2009 and 2014, the Brazil and China engaged in frequent and effective cooperation. Both countries joined the BASIC group at the 2009 United Nations Climate Change Conference in order to further coordinate negotiating positions on climate change issues. Subsequent bilateral climate change cooperation between Brazil and China was guided by the 2010 Joint Action Plan, which also emphasized environmental protection and energy security. In 2014, Brazil's economic crisis hampered its ability to fund bilateral initiatives and more broadly assert itself in international affairs; Brazil-China cooperation also declined.

Before his election as the President of Brazil in 2018, Jair Bolsonaro criticized China, stating, “China is not buying in Brazil, it is buying Brazil. Are we going to leave Brazil in the hands of the Chinese?“ As President however, Bolsonaro's approach to China was generally pragmatic and avoided confrontation. Brazil remained the main destination for Chinese investment in South America during the Bolsonaro presidency.

In August 2019, China defended Brazil from Western criticism of the 2019 Amazon rainforest wildfires, with the Chinese Ambassador to Brazil describing the criticism as a "bit fabricated". This led to thanks from Brazilian President Jair Bolsonaro, who described it as "a grand gesture that strengthened us a lot."

In October 2019, Brazilian President Jair Bolsonaro paid an official visit to China. He met Chinese leader and CCP general secretary Xi Jinping.

During the second presidency of Brazilian President Luiz Inácio Lula da Silva's foreign policy goals included "relaunching" the Brazil–China relationship. Lula visited China during the 2023 Brazil–China summit. Lula met with Chinese leader Xi Jinping, and signed 15 memoranda of understanding and 20 agreements on a wide range of issues. The summit included discussion of how Brazil and China could play a mediating role in the conflict between Ukraine and Russia. Lula also attended the inauguration of Dilma Rousseff as President of the BRICS Bank in Shanghai. “Nobody can stop Brazil from continuing to develop its relationship with China,” said President Luiz Inácio Lula da Silva during his 2023 visit to Beijing. This was taken as a reference to the United States.

In January 2024, Lula reaffirmed to CCP's foreign chief Wang Yi his recognition of China's policy of "one China", under which China claims Taiwan. In June 2024, Brazilian Vice President Geraldo Alckmin visited China for extensive talks with officials and business leaders. He has signed a number of trade agreements on sustainable development, agriculture, and infrastructure. On June 7 he met with Chinese leader Xi Jinping. In October 2024, Brazil opted against joining the Belt and Road Initiative (BRI).

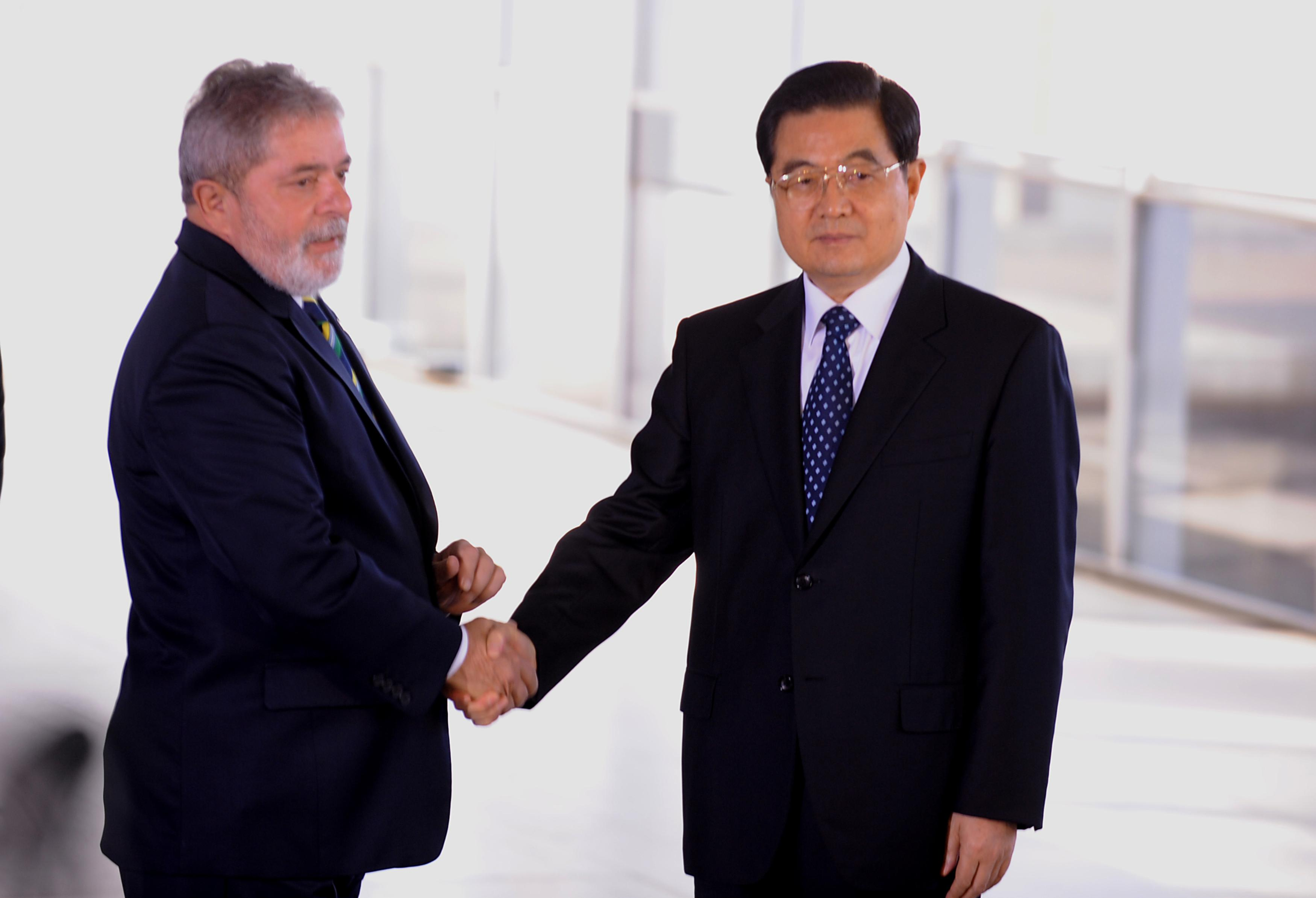
President Lula da Silva and Chinese leader Hu Jintao in Brasília; April 2010.

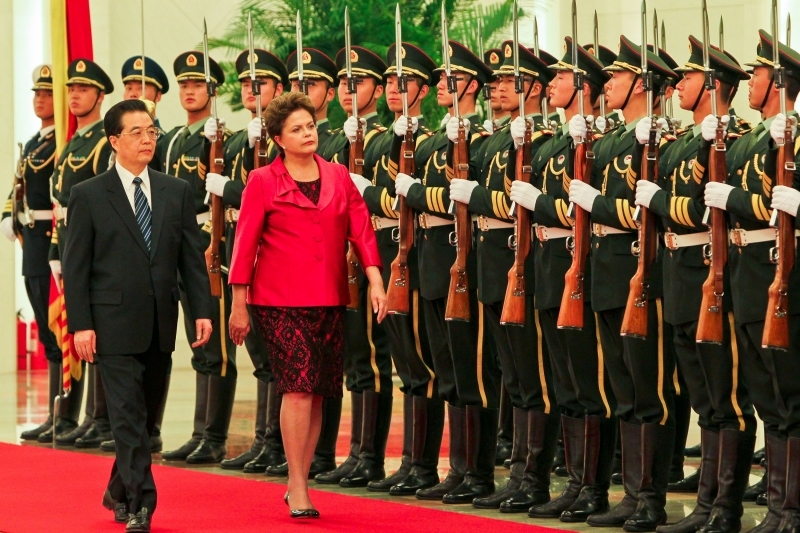
Chinese leader Hu Jintao and Brazilian president Dilma Rousseff in Beijing; April 2011.

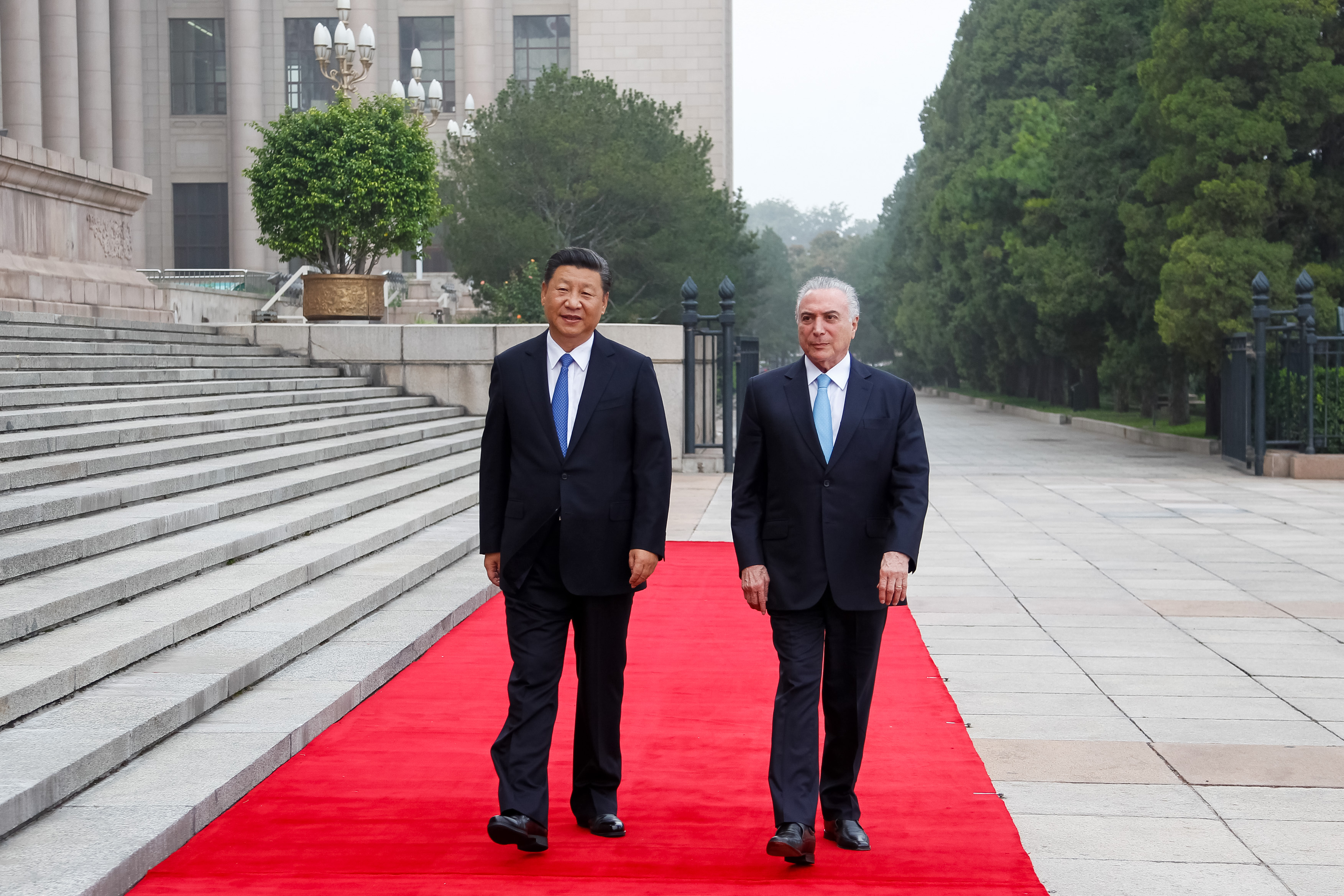
Brazilian president Michel Temer and Chinese Xi Jinping in Beijing; September 2017.

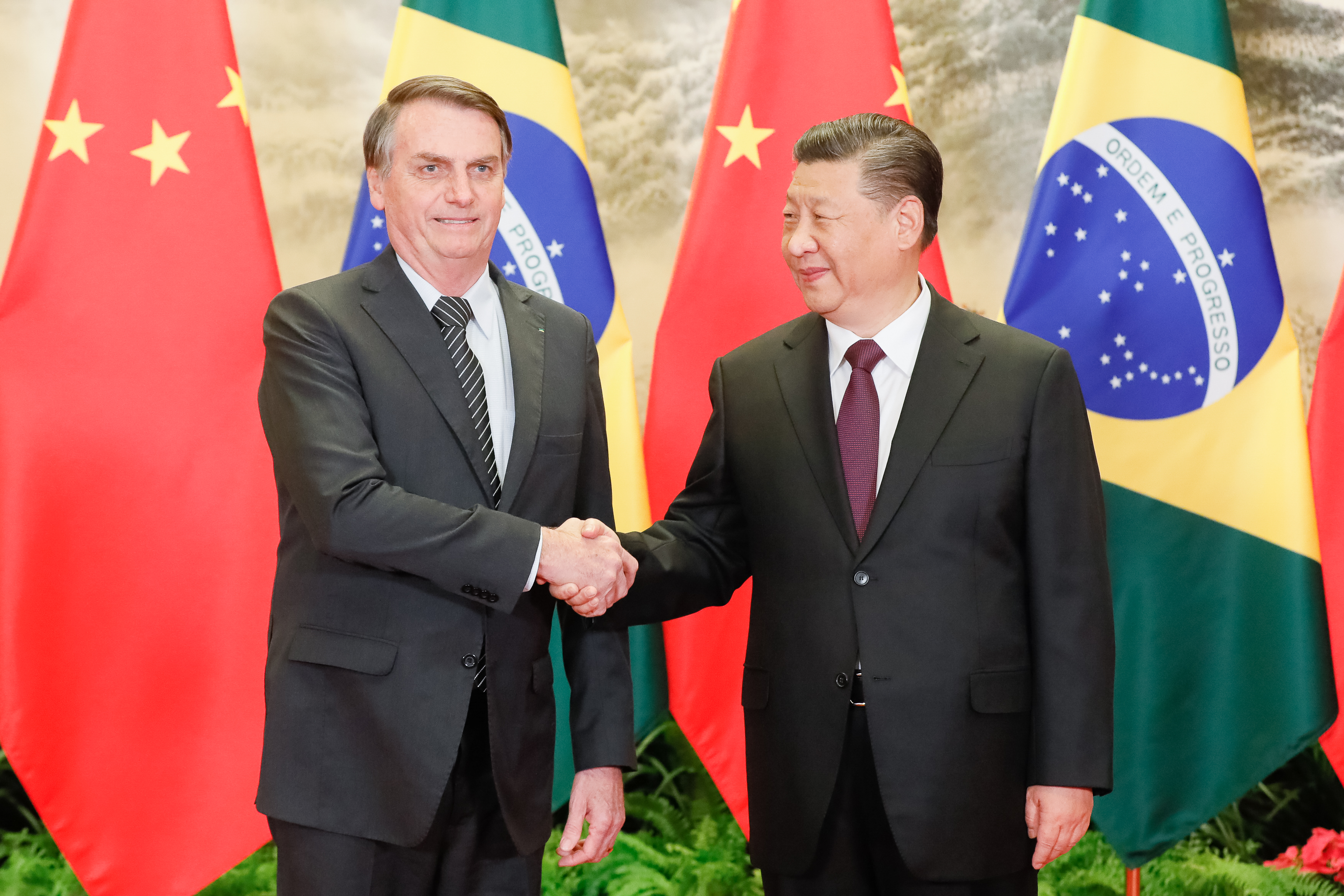
Brazilian president Jair Bolsonaro and Chinese leader Xi Jinping in Beijing; October 2019.

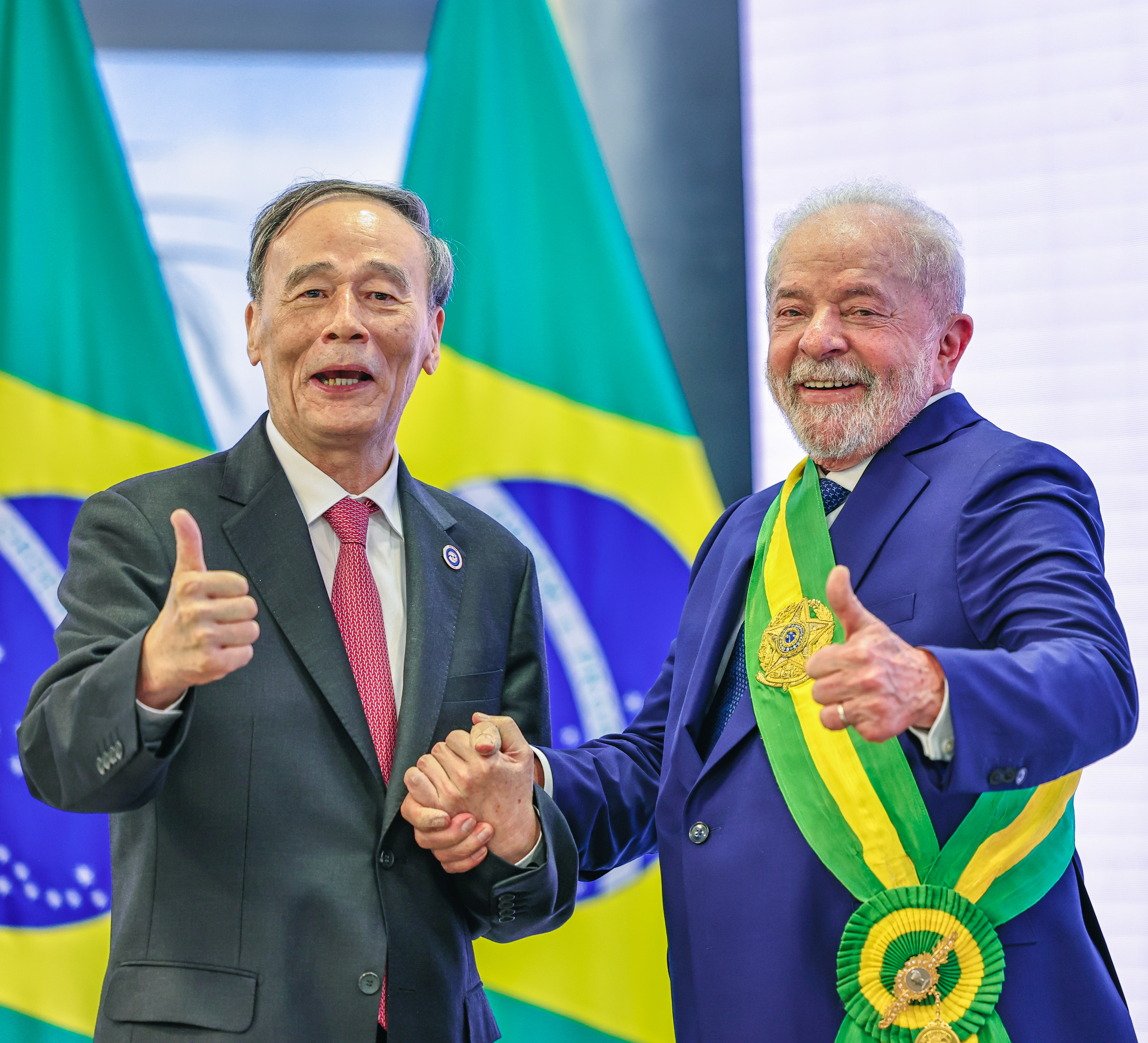
Vice President Wang Qishan and Brazilian president Lula da Silva in Brasília; January 2023.

== Taiwan ==
Brazil follows the one China principle, and recognizes government of the People's Republic of China as the sole legal government representing the whole of China and Taiwan as "an inalienable part" of China. Brazil also supports all efforts by the PRC to "achieve peaceful national reunification".

== Trade and investment ==
In 1978, Brazil and China signed their first modern trade agreement, which led to trade in energy resources, agricultural products, and raw materials.

Brazil and China both participate in the multi-lateral group Forum Macao, which China formed in 2003 to increase economic and commercial cooperation between China and the Portuguese-speaking countries.

China became Brazil's largest trading partner in 2009. Former Brazilian President Luiz Inácio Lula da Silva and many in the Brazilian media consider China to be "Brazil's most promising business partner and a strategic ally" due to China's "rapidly rising demand for raw materials and agricultural produce". Bilateral trade grew from US$6.7 billion in 2003 to US$36.7 billion in 2009.

China and Brazil cooperate economically on quite some mutual beneficial projects such as the already in 1988 preparations for a joint project to construct the China–Brazil Earth Resources Satellite program, which in 1999 and 2002 successfully constructed two satellites providing key information on (new sources of) natural resources. Secondly, an International Satellite Communications company (INSCOM) was set up as a joint venture.

Other projects in the range of the Earth Resources Satellite are the construction of Porto do Açu near Rio de Janeiro, Vitória and Campos dos Goytacazes, which can handle Chinamax containerships to import and export raw materials and manufactures vice versa. Other major important infrastructure investment are the construction of a continental pipeline, roads and high speed trains.

Chinese investment in Brazil takes strategic approaches and does so in strategic areas to consolidate China's role in the Brazilian economy, this creates economic leverage, expands the zone of influence of Chinese companies in Brazil and increases interdependence. Chinese investments in Brazil are concentrated mainly in the energy, mining, steel and oil industries.

In 2010, despite the generally friendly and close relationship, Brazil was one of the few emerging economies to publicly criticise China's policy in relation to the so-called Currency war. Brazil has called for China to allow a faster appreciation of its currency, which would help other countries to better compete against Chinese exports. Brazil also criticised US policy, saying both China and the US should seek to avoid escalating economic tension concerning trade and currency.

Brazil and China are members of an economic organization called BRICS, also consisting of Russia, India, and South Africa. China contributes 41% of the total operating budget. Brazil contributes 18% of the operating budget. China and Brazil are part of a greater goal, to increase trade among rising and developing markets.

Trade between China and Brazil was worth almost 80 billion US Dollars as of 2014. China is expanding economic ties into Latin America, and Brazil falls into that category. China is investing a Brazilian electric transmission line from the Amazon, as well as importing Brazilian planes and beef. China and Brazil, both members of BRICS, are competing for influence in Latin America. Brazil is considered a regional powerhouse in Latin America. China seeks more access to raw materials from Latin American countries such as Argentina and Venezuela to fuel their manufacturing economy.

In November 2015, several steel organizations from Brazil, along with Mexico, the European Union, and the United States advocated that countries doing business with China should evaluate their trading behavior before accepting China as a market economy. In 2016, Brazil remained neutral in the China World Trade Organization debate, and their market status in metal sector. China has put up challenges to those who question their market economy. China has been investigated for dumping their exports into Brazilian market.

In 2015, the governments of China, Peru, and Brazil proposed a plan to build a railway starting from the Atlantic Coast in Brazil to the Pacific Coast in Peru. China agreed to financially support the railway project. Due to a recession in Brazil, and environmental concern regarding the Amazon Rainforest, the original project plan involving the Chinese government did not go into action. The transcontinental rail system would cut freight expenses and time for China by using the proposed railway to ship materials from Brazil and Peru.

China is increasing investment in Brazil, with financing oil exploration to repairing railways. The repair of railways and infrastructure came ahead of the Rio Olympics in 2016. There is also a trade phase from raw materials to heavy equipment and industrial goods.

As of 2017, China began construction of a Northern Brazil-based seaport that will primarily ship foodstuffs to their home country. Communicated and service based products have also been flowing into the Brazilian market as a result of the infrastructure project. With China's plan of investing in development around the world, the Latin American country received the benefit of the future Chinese international investment plan. With infrastructure development of Brazil seaports and waterways, access to the Chinese soy markets is expected to increase. Due to the US–China tariff dispute, the source of soy from the US coming in to China will be decreasing. Whereas the Brazilian soy market is becoming more favorable to the Chinese. China sees Brazil as another source of soy.

In late March 2017, due to quality control issues of the Brazilian beef and poultry industry; China along with South Korea, the European Union, and Brazil's Latin American trading partner Chile halted or reduced meat imports from Brazil. The quality control issues consisted of contamination cases. A few days later, China reopened its market for Brazil to resume access to its ports after the meatpacking companies responsible were identified. China is considered Brazil's largest customer for meat products.

In 2016, as two respective members of the BRICS association, trade representatives from all 5 members including Brazil and China agreed to start investment amongst members, update of trading ports, and promotion of free trade. China and Brazil individually made a cooperative deal that would focus on several economic sectors, including infrastructure development, financial services, and tourism. In 2017, $20 Billion US Dollars focused on infrastructure development in Brazil had been placed into action, to which China will pay 75% of the fund. Banks in China are focused mostly on energy infrastructure.

Chinese customers of American-based ethanol will be economically pressed to find alternative ethanol sources due to US–China tariffs. In the next few years fuel ethanol will not meet demand for ethanol in China. Chinese Corporations may turn to Brazil in the near future to meet market demand. Brazil has recently in the last few years been exporting raw materials to China. Brazil in turn import manufactured goods from the People's Republic.

In April 2018, Brazilian oil company Petrobras has received several bids to sell a natural gas line to increase revenue. China's Silk Road Fund Company has been named as one of the bidders interested in the company's Gas Line System, costing $21 billion US dollars. Brazil's Petrobras and CNPC have hosted talks to have the Chinese firm agree to financially back an upgrade of a Brazilian oil refinery in return to receive oil. China has already taken part in recent Brazilian oil related projects. In October 2019, on a state visit to China, Bolsonaro announced the end of the need for visas for Chinese entry into Brazil.

Since 2022, Brazil has imposed over 120 trade intervention measures that have affected imports from China. In October 2024, Brazil imposed anti-dumping tariffs on several Chinese imports such as iron, steel, and fiber optic cable. In July 2026, Brazil raised tariffs on imported Chinese electric vehicles to 35 percent. In September 2026, China placed tariffs on Brazilian beef after the country reached its annual ‌quota of 1.1 million metric tons for shipments to China.

As of 2026, bilateral trade between the countries exceeds USD 150 billion annually.

== Science and climate cooperation ==
In 1982, Brazil and China signed their first Science and Technology Cooperation agreement.

The two countries have successfully cooperated in the field of space. Among the most successful space cooperation projects were the development and launch of earth monitoring satellites. In 1998, the two countries began cooperating to develop earth resource satellites. As of 2023, they have jointly developed six China-Brazil Earth Resource Satellites. These projects have helped both Brazil and China develop their access to satellite imagery and promoted remote sending research.

Brazil and China's clean energy cooperation is driven by their shared perception of complimentary interests regarding the deployment of clean energy. Brazil and China have established the China-Brazil Center for Climate Change and Energy Technology Innovation, which is one of the most ambitious South-South bilateral clean energy programs. Some of the center's successes include the development of an advanced biodiesel conversion process.

=== Tucano Ground Station ===
In 2026, reports of a facility called Tucano Ground Station in Bahia jointly operated by Beijing Tianlian Space Technology and Ayla Space raised concerns of dual use for civilian and military monitoring of real-time surveillance of space assets.

== Opinion polling ==
According to the Brazilian Center for International Relations (CEBRI), in 2023, half of Brazilians saw China as "a serious threat" and 75 percent of Brazilians distrusted China.

A survey published in 2026 by the Pew Research Center found that 46% of Brazilians had a favorable view of China, while 40% had an unfavorable view. It also found that 60% of Brazilians in the 18-35 age group had positive opinions of China.

== Resident diplomatic missions ==
of Brazil in China

- Beijing (Embassy)
- Chengdu (Consulate-General)
- Guangzhou (Consulate-General)
- Hong Kong (Consulate-General)
- Shanghai (Consulate-General)

of China in Brazil

- Brasília (Embassy)
- Recife (Consulate-General)
- Rio de Janeiro (Consulate-General)
- São Paulo (Consulate-General)

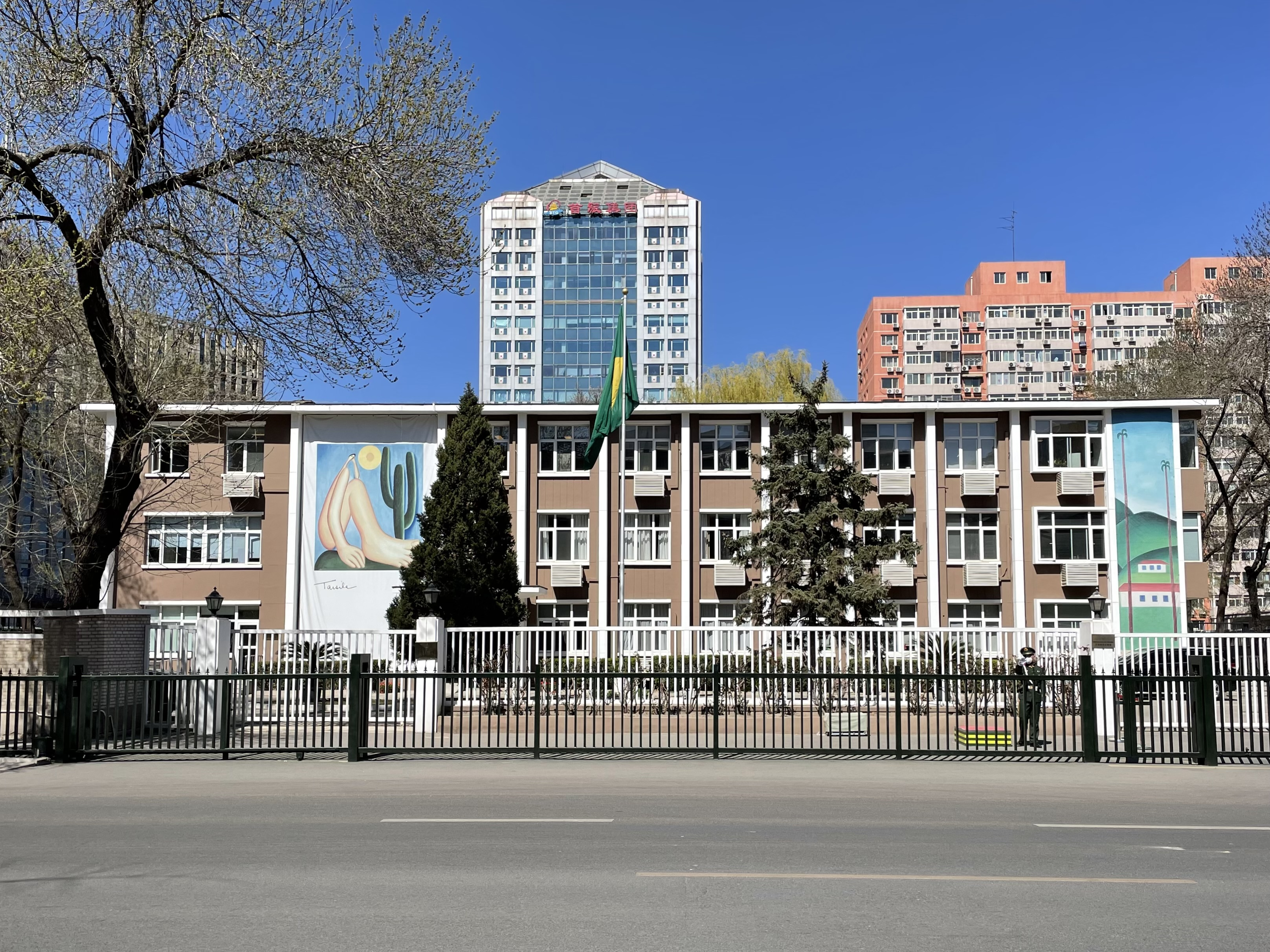
Embassy of Brazil in Beijing

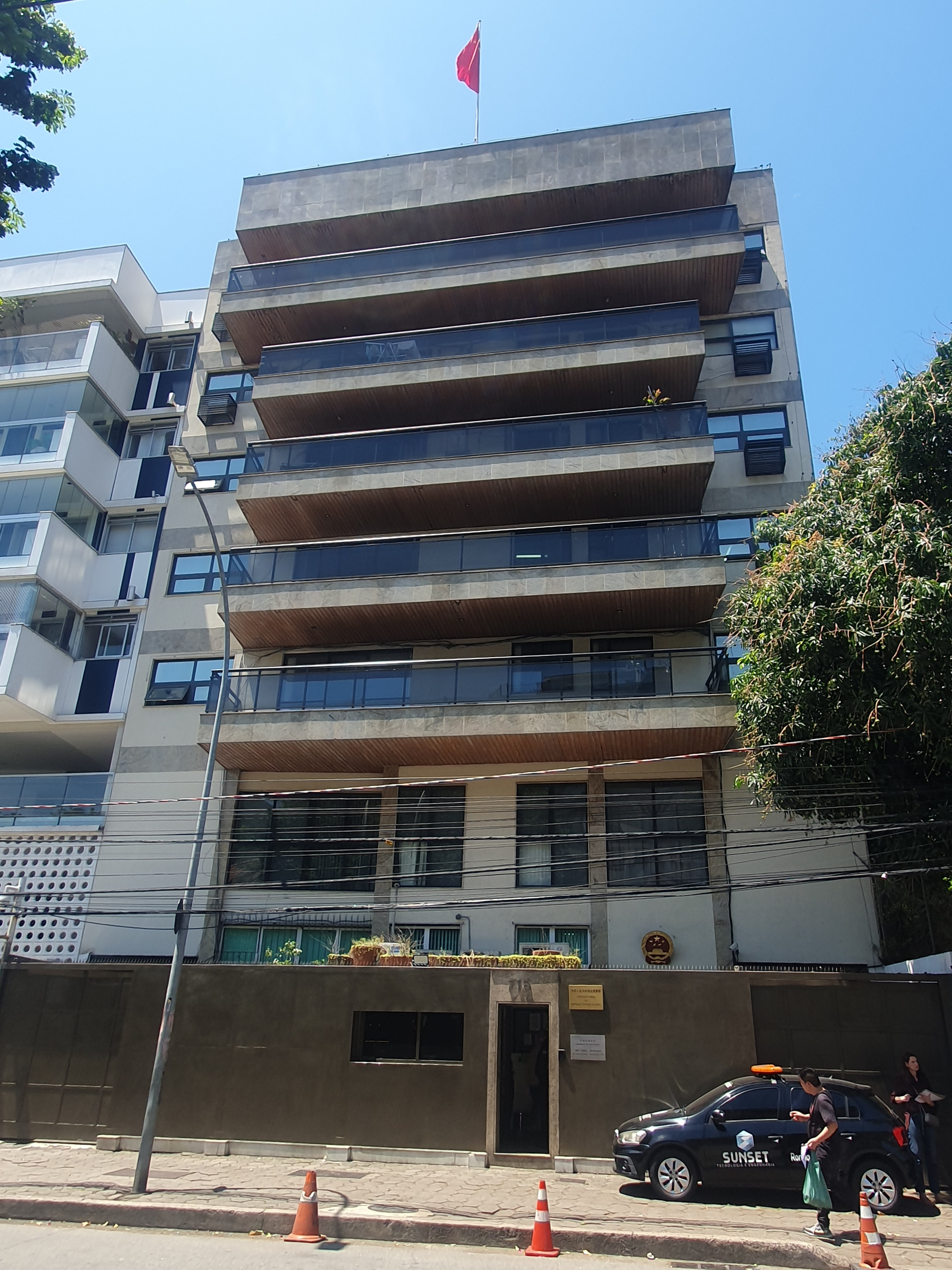
Consulate-General of China in Rio de Janeiro

== See also ==
- 2023 Brazil-China summit
- China–Latin America relations
- Chinese Brazilians
