= 2023 South American summit =

Regional summit hosted by Brazil

2023 South American summit Cumbre Sudamericana de 2023
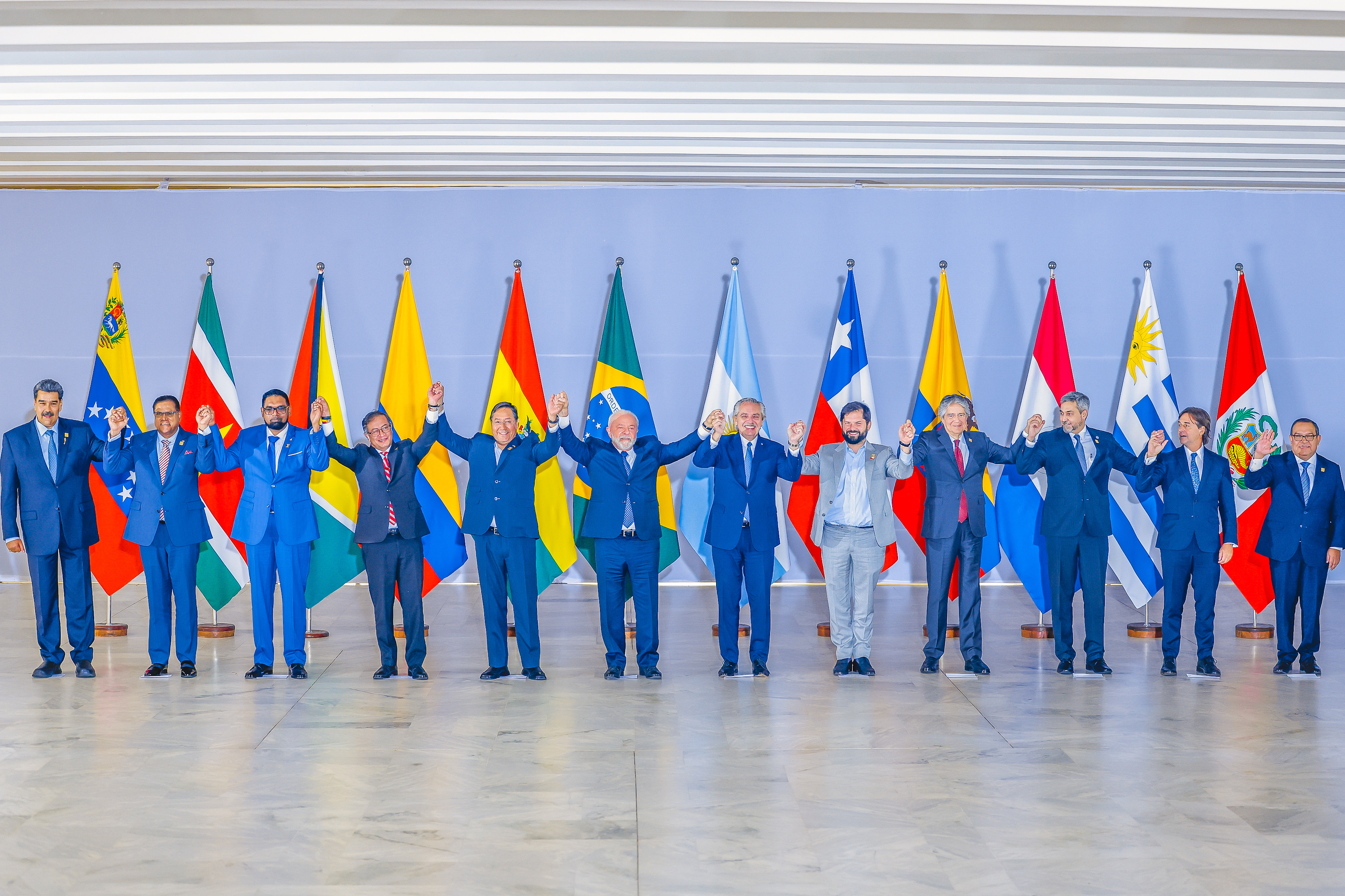
- Host country: Brazil
- Dates: May 30, 2023
- Venues: Brasília, Federal District
- Participants: Argentina; Bolivia; Brazil; Chile; Colombia; Ecuador; Guyana; Paraguay; Peru; Uruguay; Suriname; Venezuela

The 2023 South American summit was a summit organized and hosted by the government of Brazil "to deal with the importance of seeking collective solutions in the name of a common destiny and to reposition the region as an important actor on the global stage". The summit was held on May 30, 2023, in the city of Brasília.

Participant nations

== Agenda priorities ==
Brazil has put four agenda priorities for the dialogue:

- Revitalize integration of South America
- Repositioning South America on the global stage
- Rethinking South America as a region of peace and cooperation
- Reactivate UNASUR

== List of participants ==
With the exception of Peruvian President Dina Boluarte, all the other South American heads of state attended the event. Peru was represented by the President of the Council of Ministers, Alberto Otárola.

Host
(Brazil)	Brazil	Luiz Inácio Lula da Silva	President
Invitees
Guest		Represented by	Title
(Argentina)	Argentina	Alberto Fernández	President
(Bolivia)	Bolivia	Luis Arce	President
(Chile)	Chile	Gabriel Boric	President
(Colombia)	Colombia	Gustavo Petro	President
(Ecuador)	Ecuador	Guillermo Lasso	President
(Guyana)	Guyana	Irfaan Ali	President
(Paraguay)	Paraguay	Mario Abdo Benítez	President
(Peru)	Peru	Alberto Otárola	Prime Minister
(Suriname)	Suriname	Chan Santokhi	President
(Uruguay)	Uruguay	Luis Lacalle Pou	President
(Venezuela)	Venezuela	Nicolás Maduro	President

== Participated leaders ==
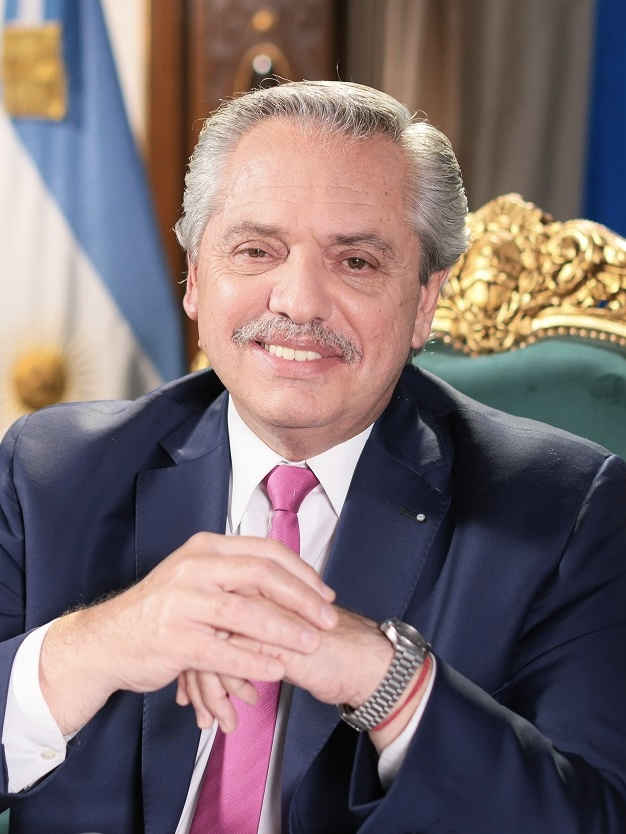
Argentina
Alberto Fernández, President

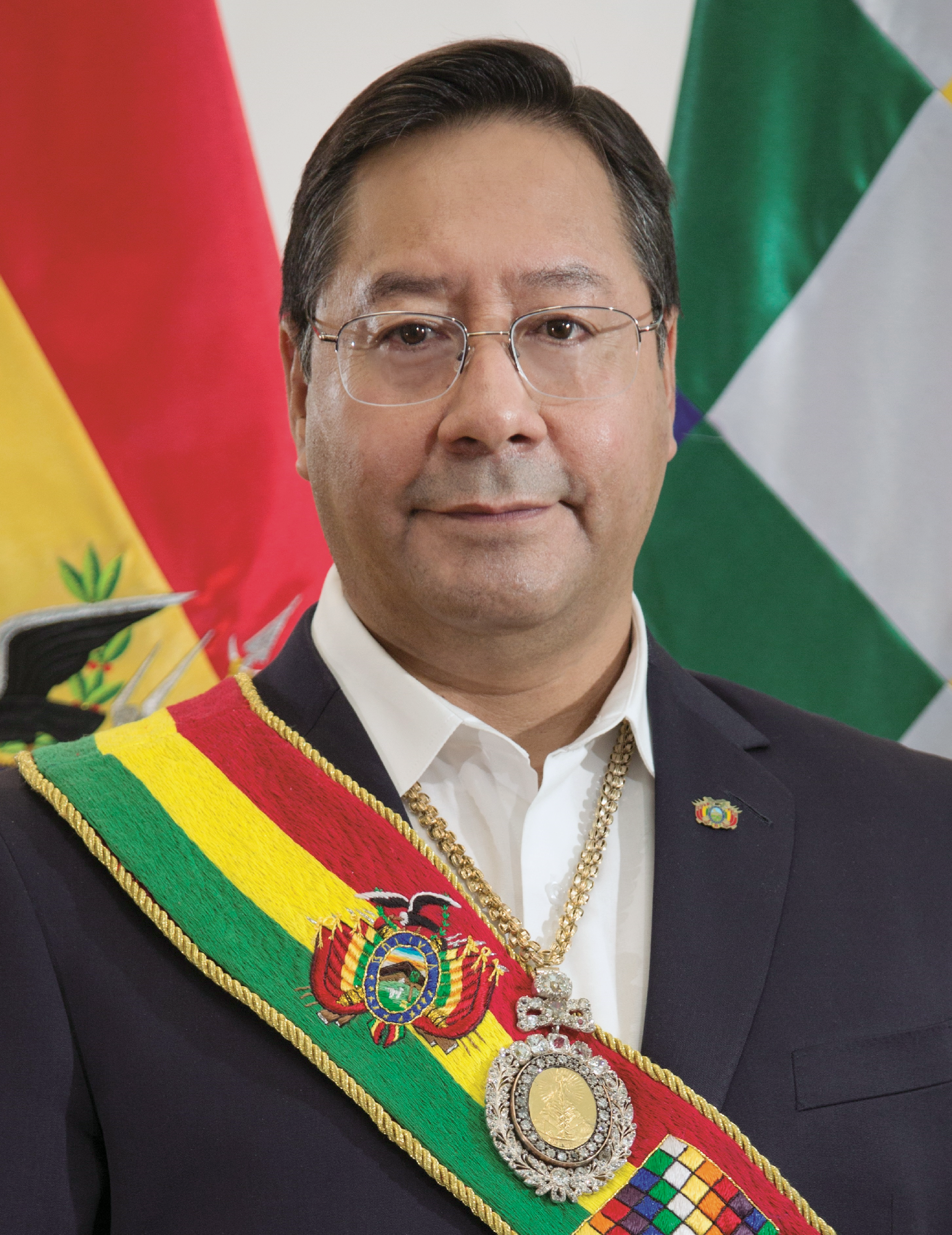
Bolivia
Luis Arce, President

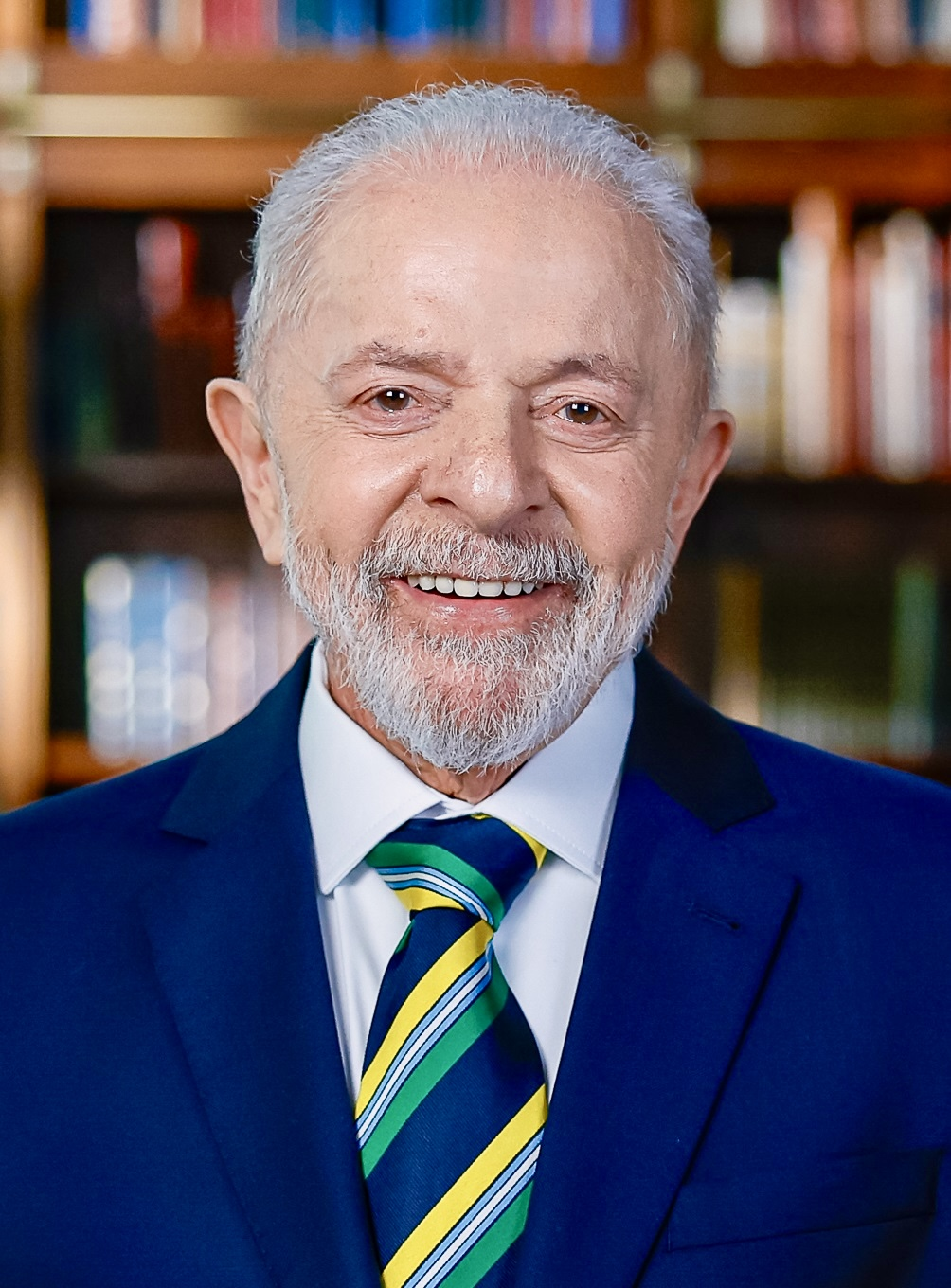
Brazil
Luiz Inácio Lula da Silva, President (Host)

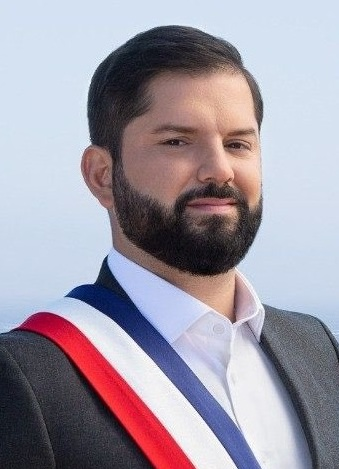
Chile
Gabriel Boric, President

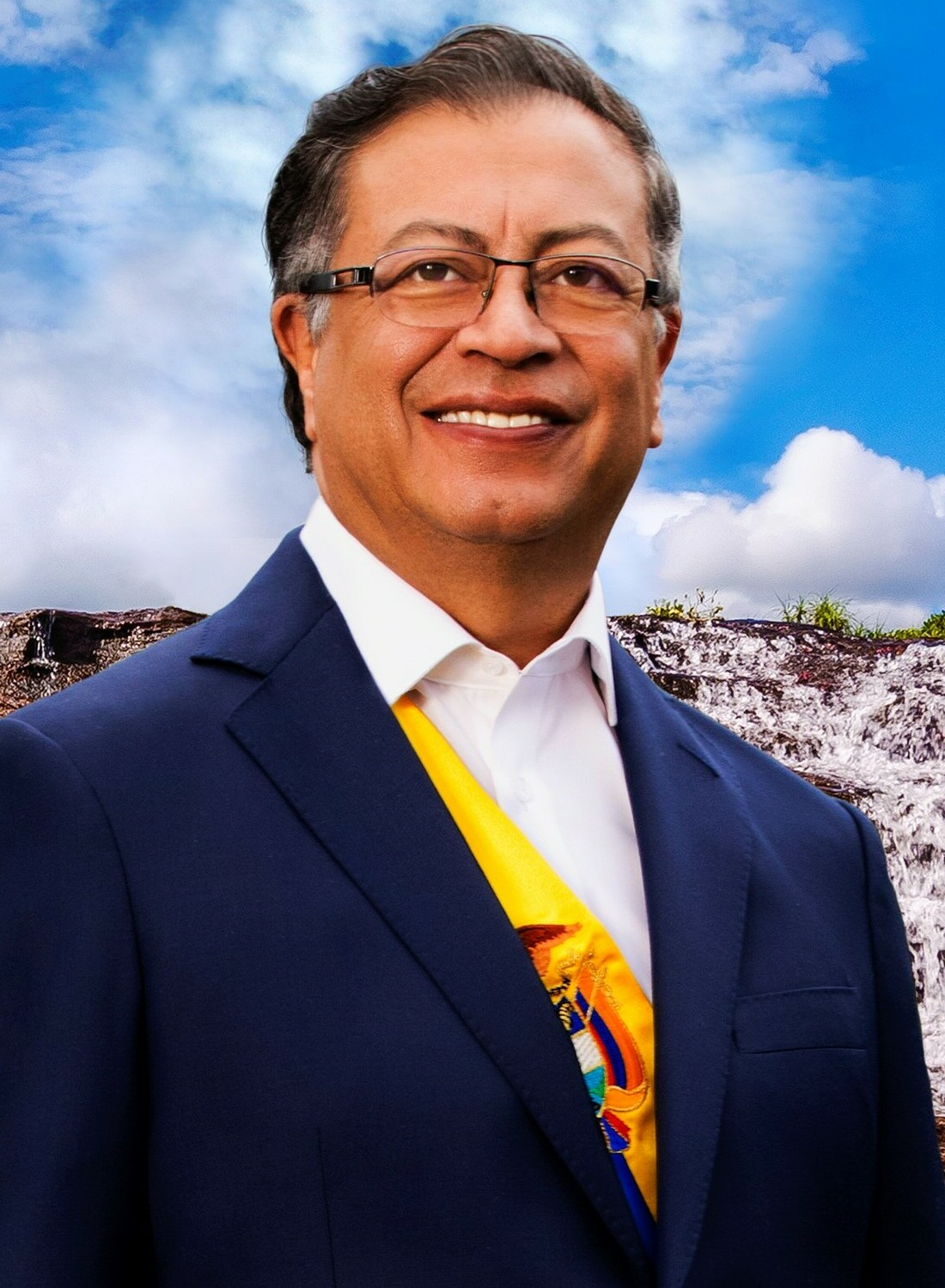
Colombia
Gustavo Petro, President

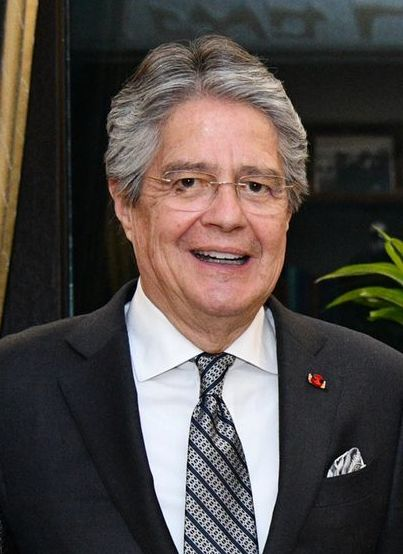
Ecuador
Guillermo Lasso, President

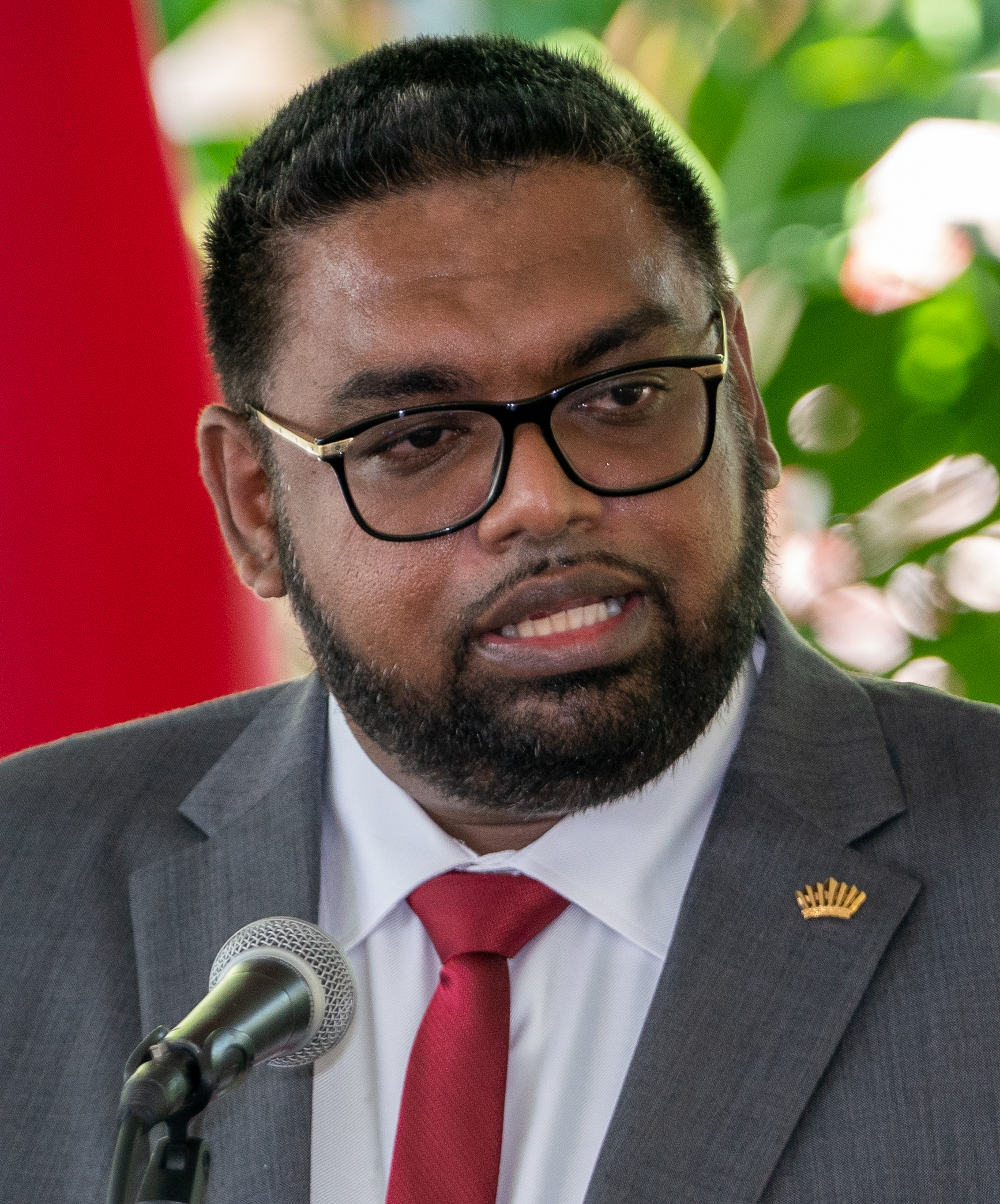
Guyana
Irfaan Ali, President

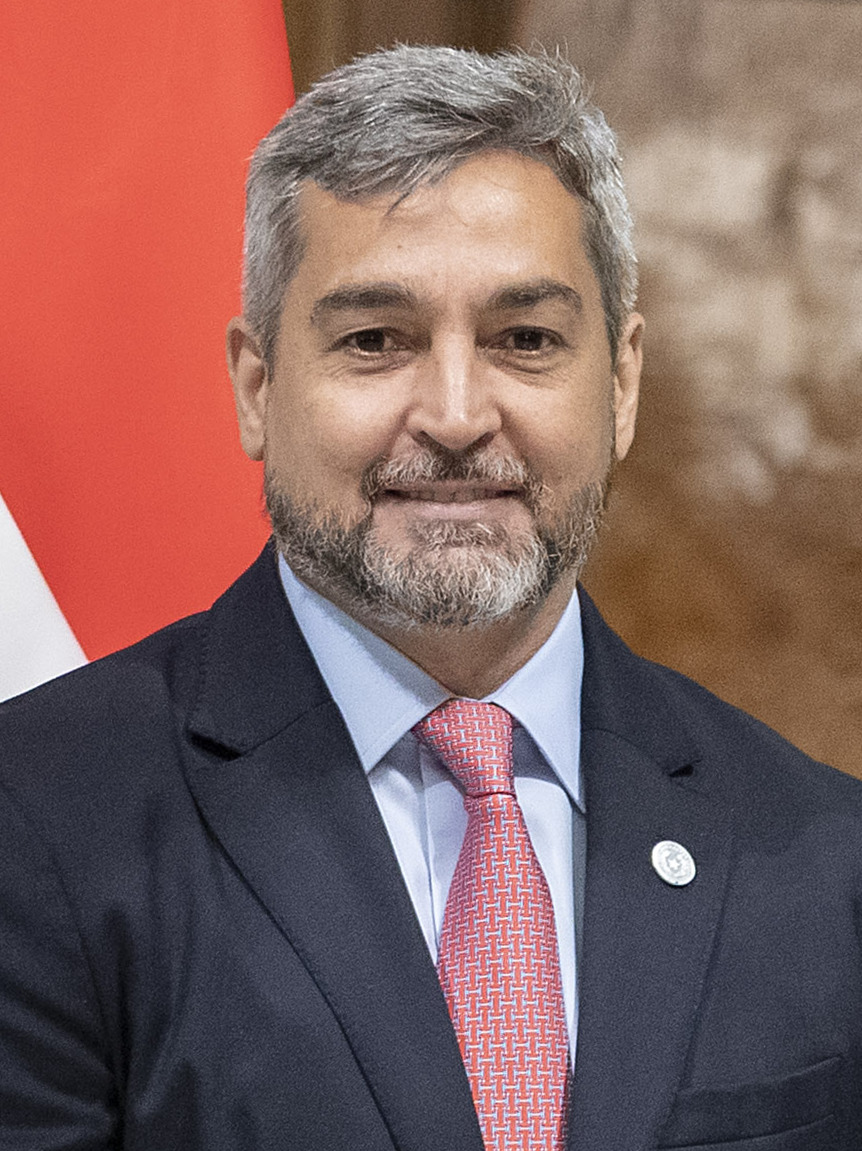
Paraguay
Mario Abdo Benítez, President

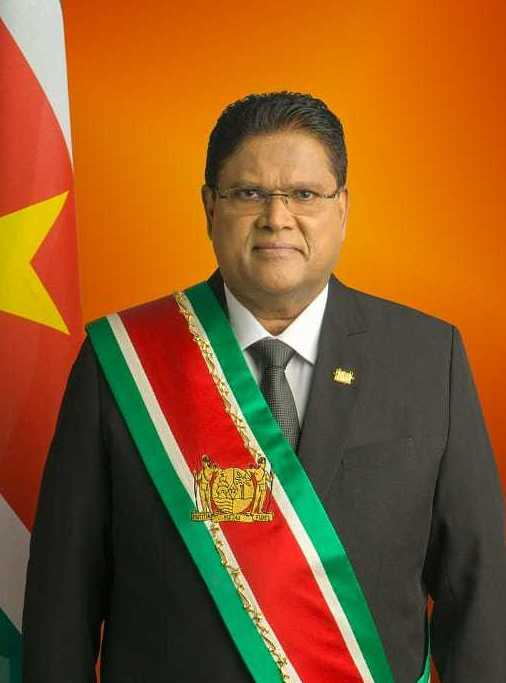
Suriname
Chan Santokhi, President

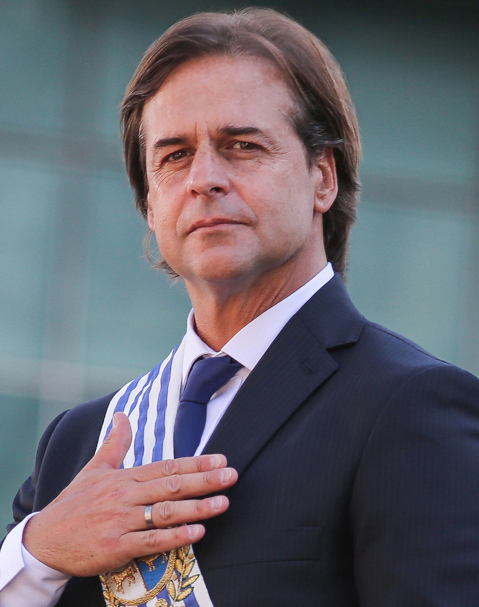
Uruguay
Luis Lacalle Pou, President

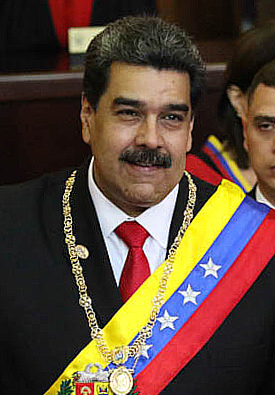
Venezuela
Nicolás Maduro, President

== Outcomes ==
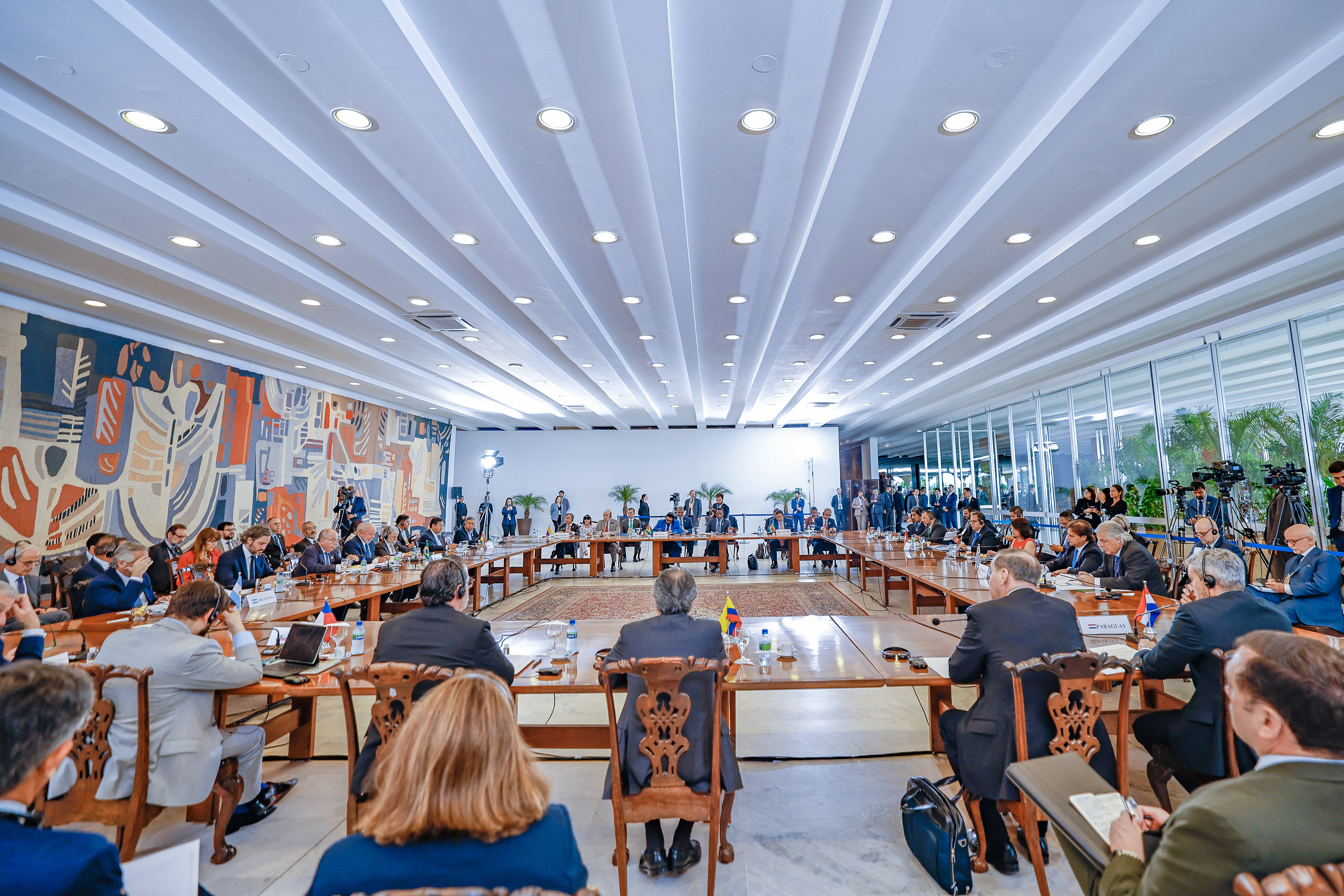
2023 South American summit

The Summit issued the Brasilia Consensus, in which it decided to promote cooperation in the areas of health, food security, disaster prevention and mitigation, infrastructure and logistics, energy, digital transformation, defence and security, combating transnational organized crime and cybersecurity.

== See also ==
- 2023 Brazil–China summit
- 2024 G20 Brazil summit
