= 2023 Brazil–China summit =

Meeting between Luiz Inácio Lula da Silva and Xi Jinping

2023 Brazil–China summit 2023巴中峰会
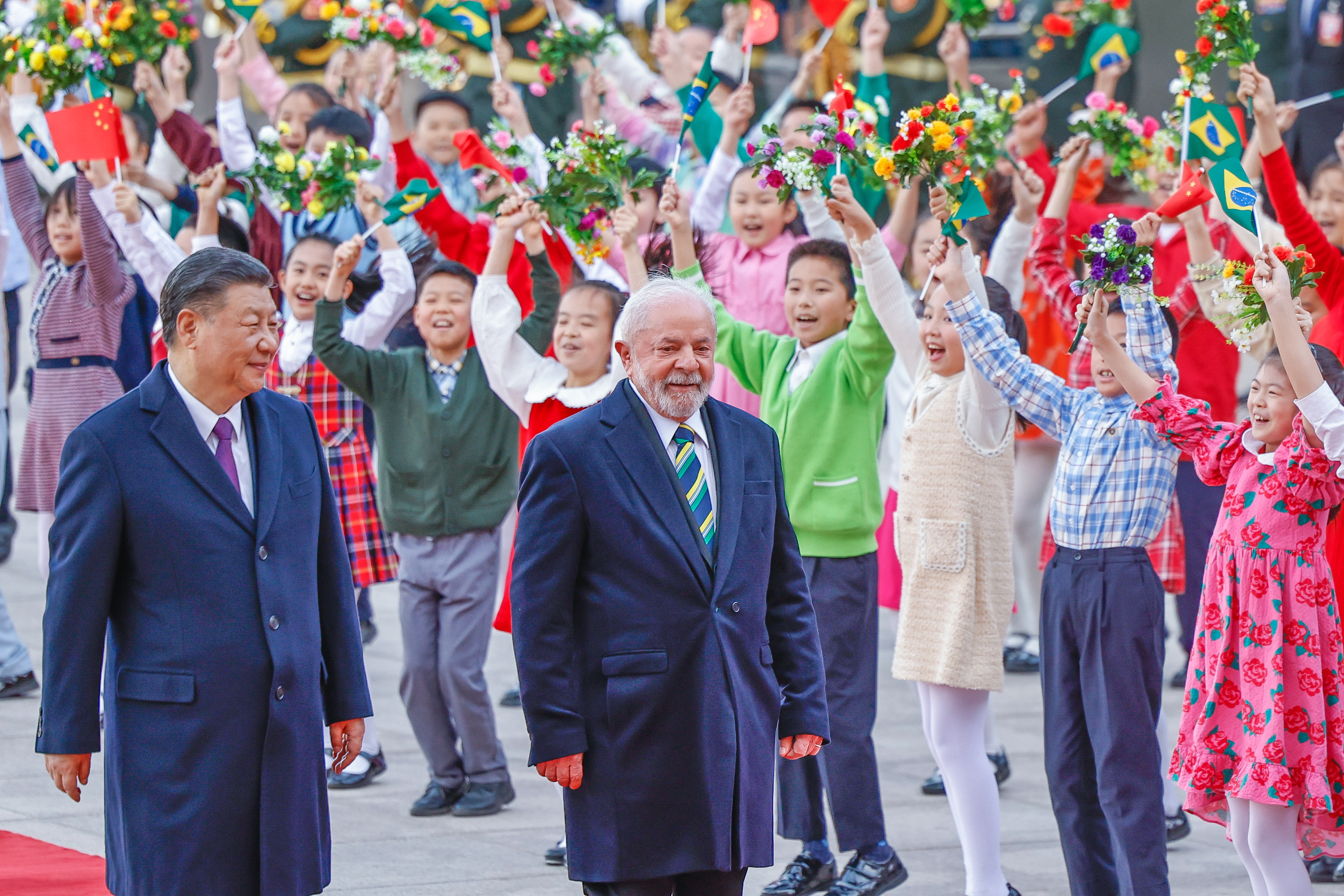
- Lula and Xi in Beijing
- Host country: China
- Date: 11–14 April 2023
- Venues: Great Hall of the People, Beijing; Shanghai
- Participants: Luiz Inácio Lula da Silva, President of Brazil; Xi Jinping, CCP General Secretary & President of China

Key points

The 2023 Brazil–China summit was a four-day state visit by Luiz Inácio Lula da Silva, the President of Brazil, to China from 11 to 14 April 2023. It was Lula's first visit to China since his third taking office in January 2023. He was accompanied by a delegation of more than 240 CEOs, politicians and government officials and met with the Brazilian business community in China. He also met with Xi Jinping, the General Secretary of the Chinese Communist Party and President of China, to discuss various issues, especially the ongoing war in Ukraine and Brazil–China's potential roles as a mediators between Russia and the West.

== Background ==
After four years of cold relations between the two countries, undermined by attacks against China by former President, Jair Bolsonaro, Lula came to office with the mission of "relaunching" the Brazil–China relationship as one of his main goals in the foreign policy of his new mandate. The discussions on how Brazil and China could play a mediating role in the conflict between Ukraine and Russia was also on the agenda. The Brazilian government said Lula's main goal in his visit was to restart trade relations with China.

Lula also attended the inauguration of Dilma Rousseff as President of the BRICS Bank in Shanghai.

Lula was scheduled to leave for a visit to China on March 25, but postponed his trip because he was diagnosed with the flu and pneumonia.

== Meeting ==
=== Shanghai ===
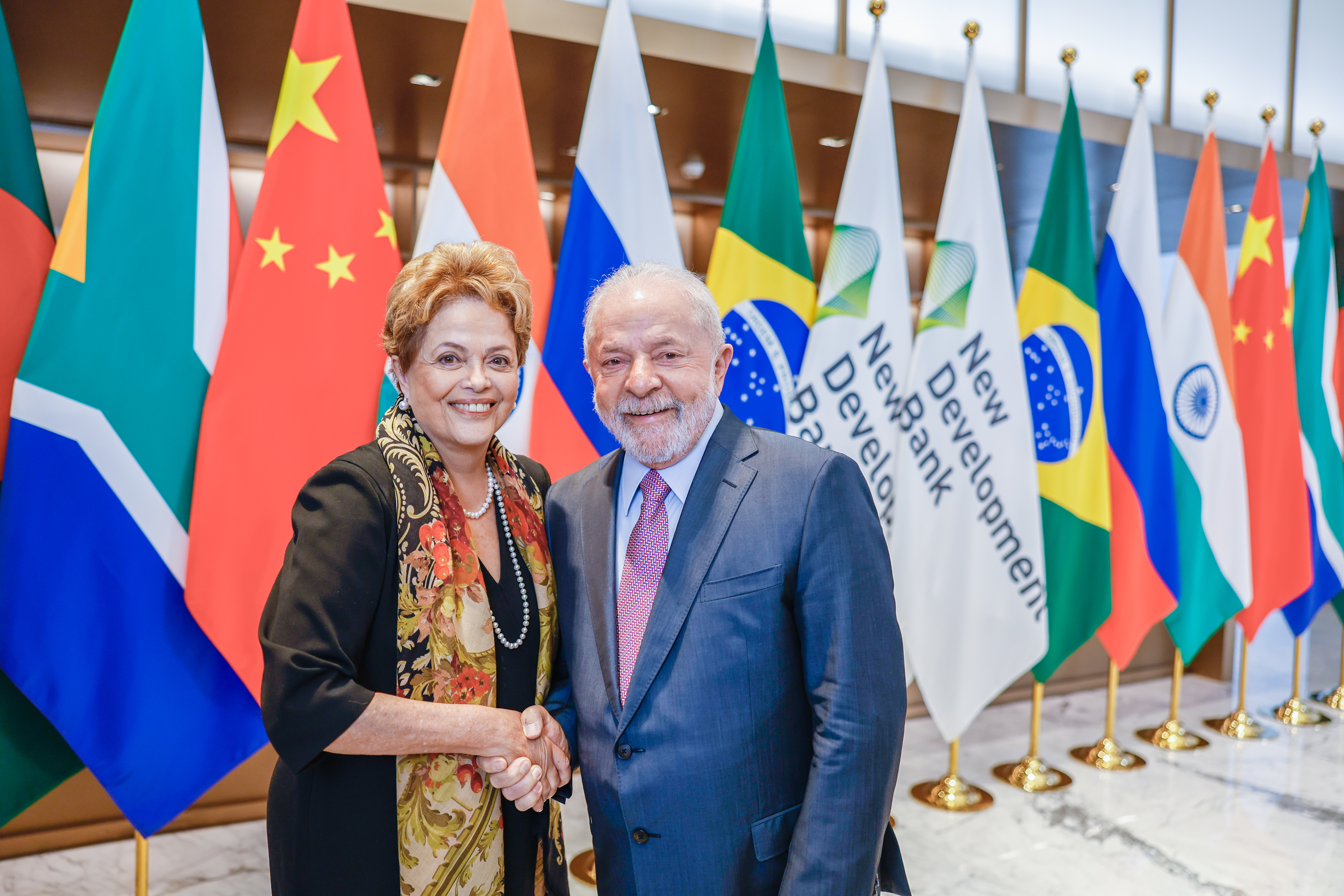
President of Brazil Lula attended the inauguration of former President Dilma Rousseff as president of the BRICS New Development Bank

President of Brazil Lula da Silva and his wife Rosângela Lula da Silva arrive at Shanghai Pudong International Airport on April 12, 2023, to begin an official visit to China. the Brazilian delegation, which included dozens of political representatives and more than 240 entrepreneurs, was there precisely to promote the re-escalation of economic and trade cooperation.

Lula's first stop in China was Shanghai, instead of Beijing as originally planned, to attend the inauguration of former President Dilma Rousseff as president of the BRICS New Development Bank., as well as to visit tech company Huawei research and development facilities and the recently inaugurated suzanoasia R&D and Innovation Center. Lula also called to propose an alternative currency to the United States dollar for trade between them.

=== Beijing ===
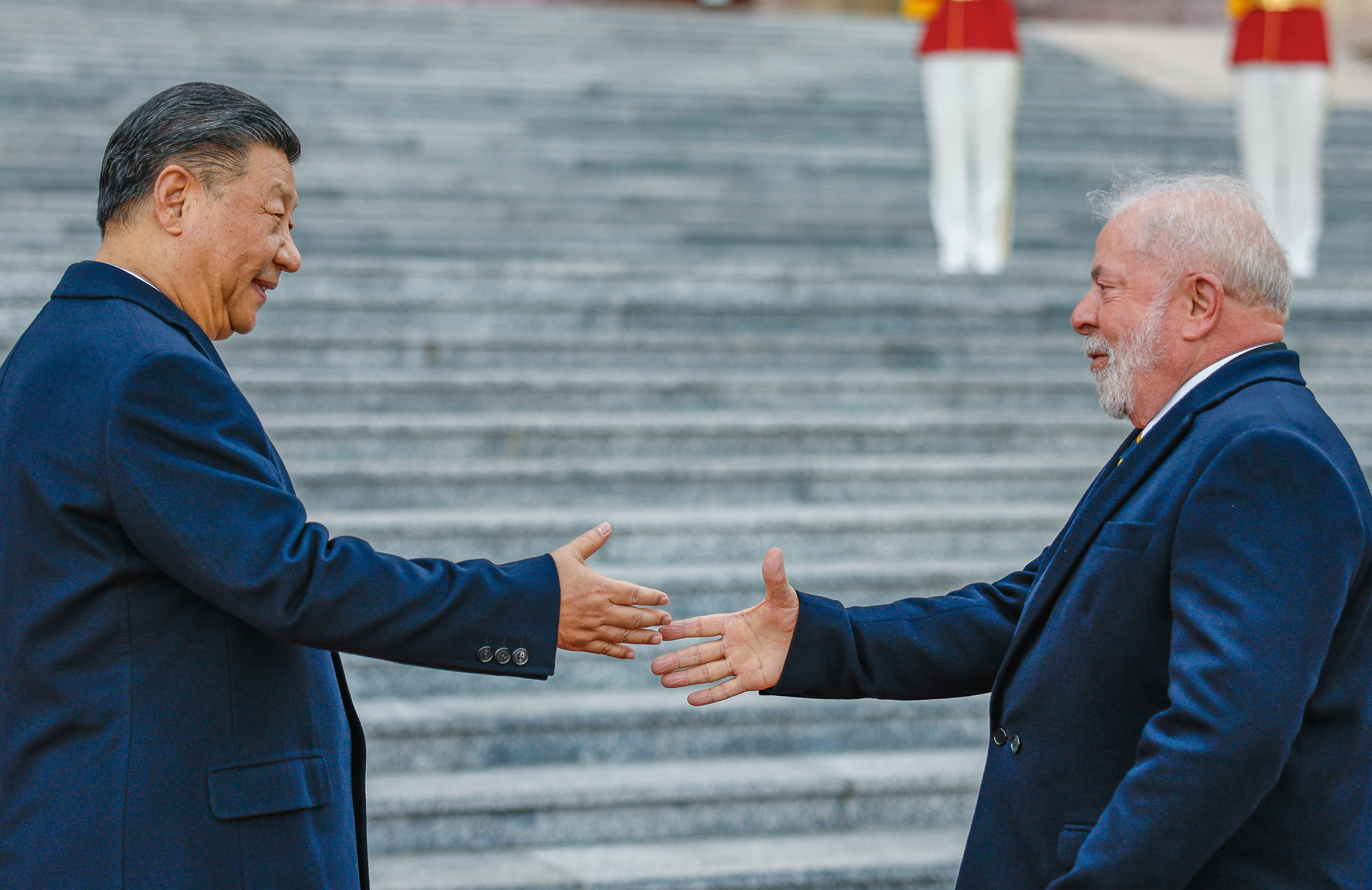
President Xi Jinping and President Lula shake hands

On the morning of April 14, 2023, President Xi held a welcoming ceremony for President Lula at the square of the Great Hall of the People. One was that in addition to the Brazilian national anthem, the military band specially played a Brazilian song Novo Tempo.

On April 14, 2023, President Xi Jinping held talks at the Great Hall of the People with President of Brazil Lula. After the talks, the two heads of state witnessed the signing of a number of bilateral cooperation documents in the fields of trade and investment, digital economy, science and technology innovation, information and communication, poverty reduction, quarantine and space. The two sides issued the Joint Declaration of the People's Republic of China and the Federative Republic of Brazil on Deepening Comprehensive Strategic Partnership.

== Agenda priorities ==
Brazil has put several agenda priorities for the dialogue with his Chinese counterparties:

- Revitalize the Brazil–China strategic partnership
- Repositioning Brazil on the global stage
- Repositioning the Global South as an important actor on the global stage
- Discussions on the war in Ukraine and Brazil and China's roles as mediators
- Discussions on the role of the United States and the European Union on the war
- Signing of several economic, technological and cultural agreements
- Discussions about decrease the dependence the two countries on the dollar
- Discussions about the BRICS membership expansion
- Discussions about Brazil's accession to China's Belt and Road Initiative

== See also ==
- BRICS New Development Bank
- 2023 France–China Summit
- 2023 South American summit
- 2024 state visit by Xi Jinping to Peru and Brazil
