= China International Import Expo =

International trade fair in Shanghai

- Expo Logo
- Abbreviation: CIIE
- Formation: 2018; 8 years ago
- Purpose: Trade Expo
- Headquarters: Shanghai
- Location: China
- Website: www.ciie.org/zbh/en/

The China International Import Expo (CIIE) is a trade fair held in autumn annually since 2018 in Shanghai, China. It is the world's first import-themed national-level expo. It will feature exhibitions of multiple countries and businesses and the Hongqiao International Economic and Trade Forum. CIIE was personally proposed and announced by Xi Jinping, current General Secretary of the Chinese Communist Party.

The expo is co-hosted by the Ministry of Commerce of China and the Shanghai Municipal Government. Its partners include World Trade Organization, United Nations Conference on Trade and Development and United Nations Industrial Development Organization.

The import expo has the purpose of promoting the Chinese domestic market to foreign companies, and to boost domestic consumption.

The 2018 inaugural edition was opened by Xi Jinping in person. Drawing 400,000 registrations, the expo has been criticized as being of mostly symbolic value, with half of the deals signed not being executed according to European business representatives.

The 2019 edition was also opened by Xi Jinping and notably visited by French President Emmanuel Macron. This year's edition drew 500,000 registrations, of which 6,000 foreigners.

The 2020 edition could proceed despite the COVID-19 pandemic, albeit drawing a lower number of 400,000 registrants.

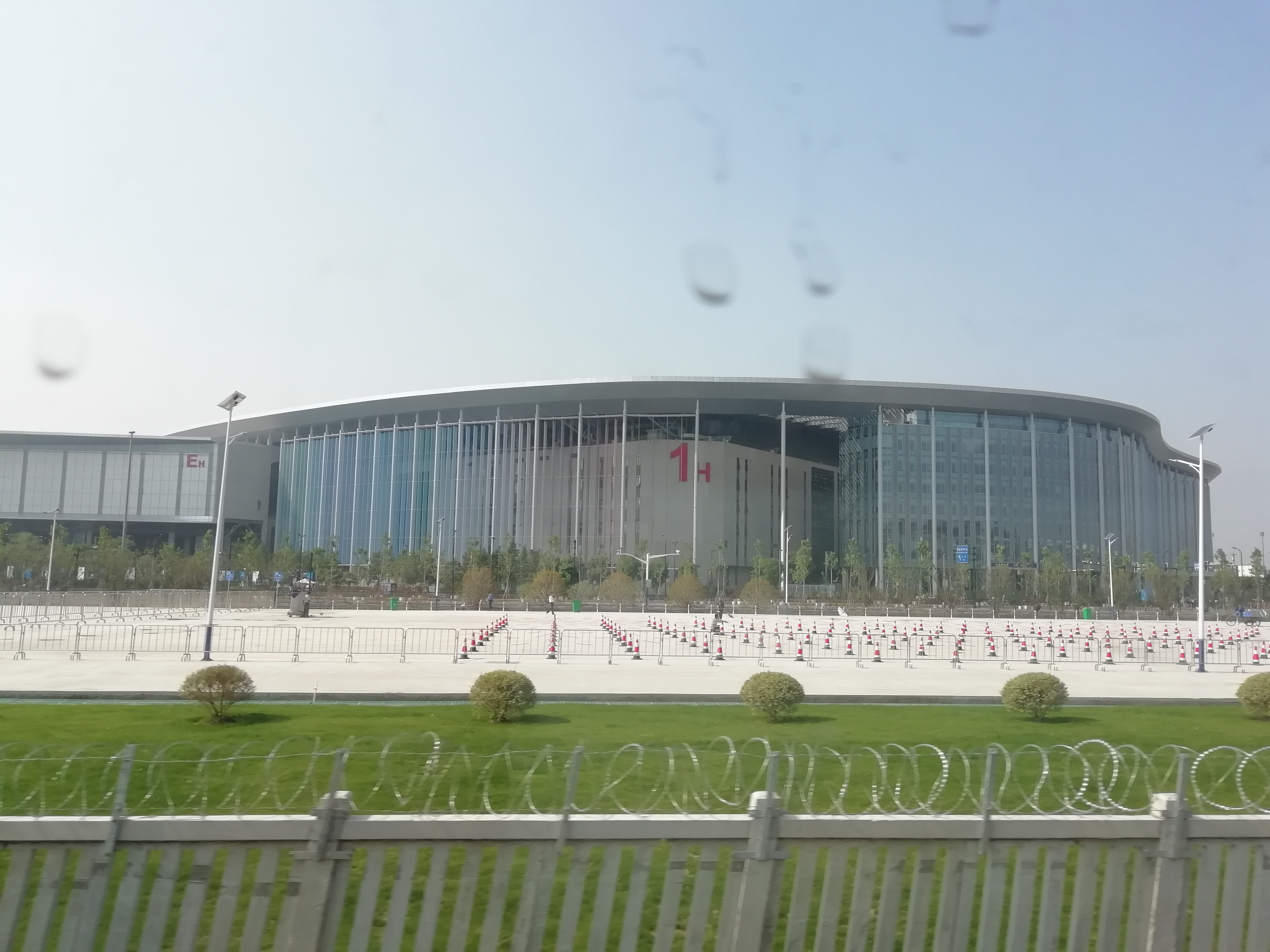
The China International Import Expo is held at National Exhibition and Convention Center (Shanghai)

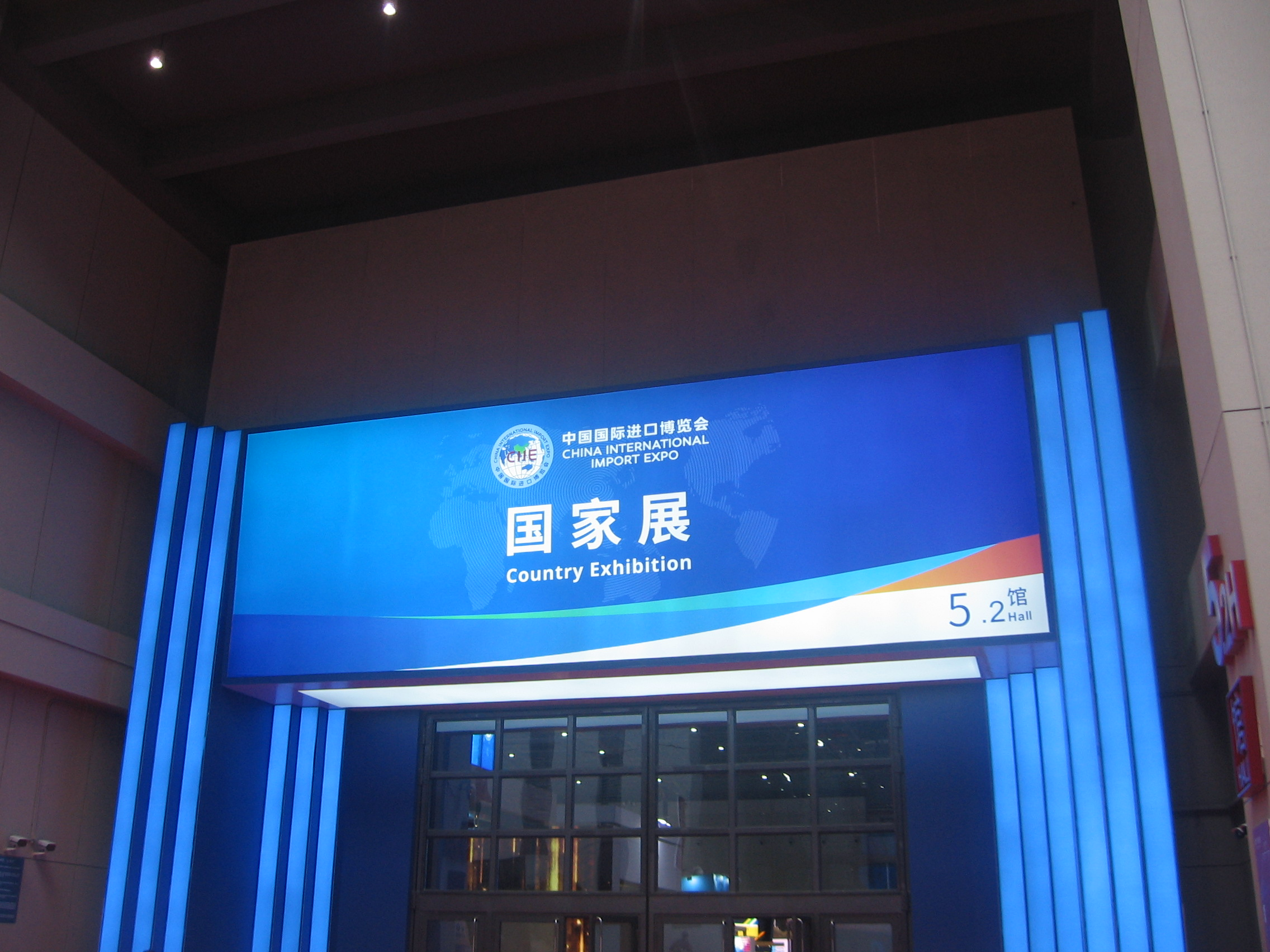
Country Exhibition at China International Import Expo

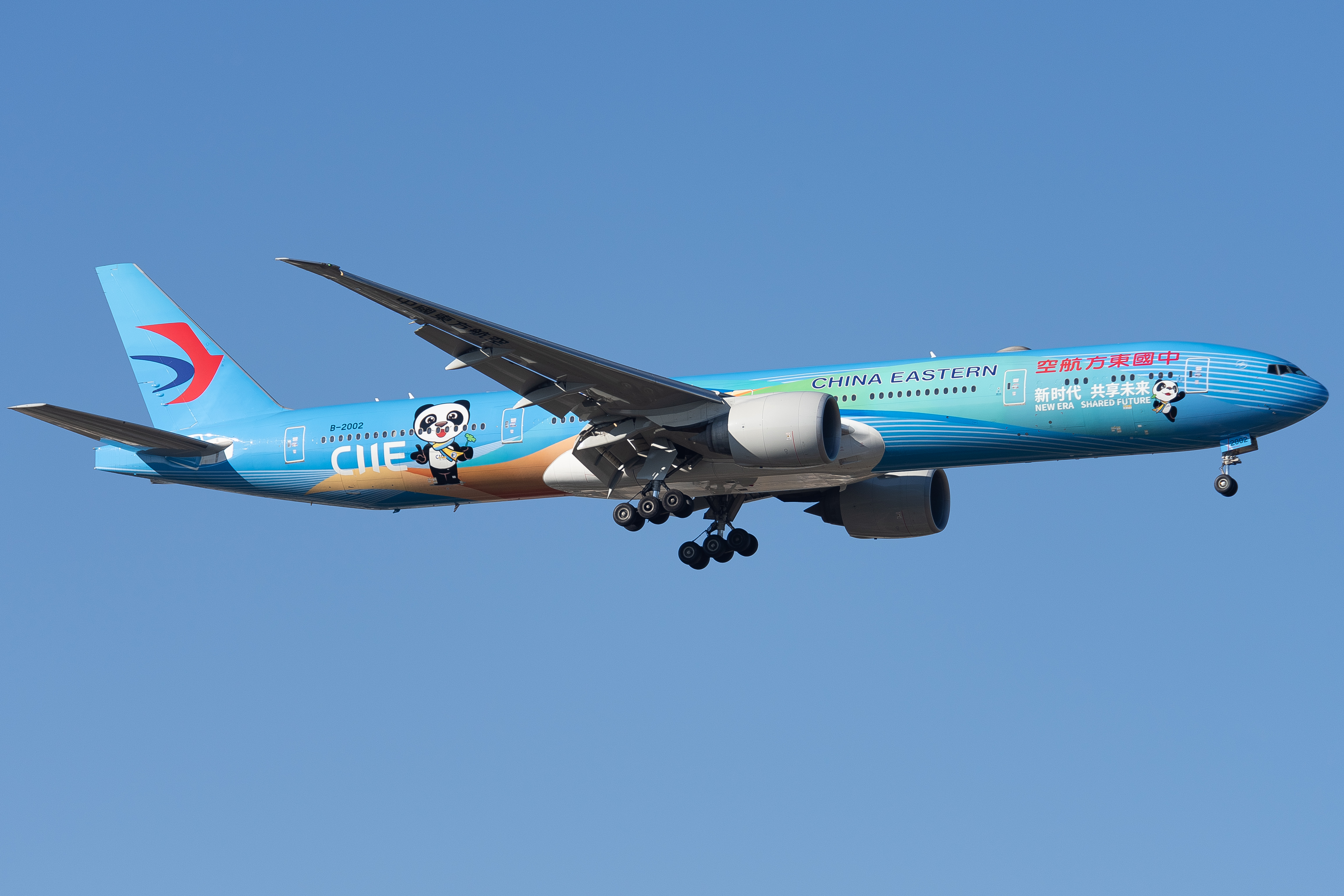
A China Eastern Airlines Boeing 777-300ER in CIIE special livery
