= Summit (meeting) =

Meeting of heads of state or government

A summit or summit meeting is an international meeting of heads of state or government, usually with considerable media exposure, tight security, and a prearranged agenda.

Notable summit meetings include those of Franklin D. Roosevelt, Winston Churchill, and Joseph Stalin during World War II, although the term summit was not commonly used for such meetings until the 1955 Geneva Summit. Following World War II, the Cold War saw American presidents join up with either Soviet or Chinese leaders for one-on-one meetings, which saw the media label these events off as a summit. The post–Cold War era has produced an increase in the number of events described as summits. Since then, international summits are now the most common expression for global governance. Summit diplomacy fosters interpersonal trust between leaders and reinforces system trust in the state-as-person construct, which is identified as the implicit glue holding the international system together.

== Notable summits ==
=== Allied World War II conferences ===
- U.S.–British Staff Conference (ABC–1) (January 29 – March 27, 1941)
- Atlantic Conference (August 9–12, 1941)
- Moscow Conference (September 29 – October 1, 1941)
- Arcadia Conference (December 22, 1941 – January 14, 1942)
- Second Washington Conference (June 20–25, 1942)
- Second Moscow Conference (August 12–19, 1942)
- Cherchell Conference (October 21–22, 1942)
- Casablanca Conference (January 14–24, 1943)
- Bermuda Conference (April 19, 1943)
- Third Washington Conference (May 12–27, 1943)
- Quebec Conference (August 17–24, 1943)
- Third Moscow Conference (October 18 – November 1, 1945)
- Cairo Conference (November 22–26, 1943)
- Tehran Conference (November 28 – December 1, 1943)
- Second Cairo Conference (December 4–6, 1943)
- Commonwealth Prime Ministers' Conference (May 1–16, 1944)
- United Nations Monetary and Financial Conference (Bretton Woods) (July 1–15, 1944)
- Dumbarton Oaks Conference (August 21–29, 1944)
- Second Quebec Conference (September 12–16, 1944)
- Fourth Moscow Conference (October 9, 1944)
- Malta Conference (January 30 – February 2, 1945)
- Yalta Conference (February 4–11, 1945)
- United Nations Conference on International Organization (April 25 – June 26, 1945)
- Potsdam Conference (July 17 – August 2, 1945)

=== Soviet Union–United States summits ===
- Geneva Summit (July 18–23, 1955)
- Washington and Camp David Summit (September 15, 26–27, 1959)
- Paris Summit (May 16–17, 1960)
- Vienna Summit (June 3–4, 1961)
- Glassboro Summit Conference (June 23 and 25, 1967)
- Moscow Summit (SALT I) (May 22–30, 1972)
- Washington Summit (June 18–25, 1973)
- Moscow Summit (June 28 – July 3, 1974)
- Vladivostok Summit Meeting on Arms Control (November 23–24, 1974)
- Helsinki Summit (July 30 and August 2, 1975)
- Vienna Summit (SALT II) (June 15–18, 1979)
- Geneva Summit (November 19–21, 1985)
- Reykjavík Summit (October 10–12, 1986)
- Washington Summit (December 7–10, 1987)
- Moscow Summit (May 29 – June 1, 1988)
- Governors Island Summit (December 7, 1988)
- Malta Summit (December 2–3, 1989)
- Washington Summit (May 30 – June 3, 1990)
- Helsinki Summit (September 9, 1990)
- Paris Summit (November 19, 1990)
- London Summit (July 17, 1991)
- Moscow Summit (START I) (July 30–31, 1991)
- Madrid Summit (October 29–30, 1991)

=== Russia–United States summits ===
- 1993 – Moscow Summit (START II)
- 1998 – Moscow Summit
- 2001 – Slovenia Summit 2001
- 2002 – Moscow Summit (SORT)
- 2005 – Slovakia Summit 2005
- 2018 – Russia–United States summit
- 2021 – Russia–United States summit
- 2025 – Russia–United States summit

=== African Union summits ===
- 2014 – United States–Africa Leaders Summit 2014
- 2019 – 2019 Russia–Africa Summit
- 2022 – United States–Africa Leaders Summit 2022
- 2023 – 2023 Russia–Africa Summit
- 2024 – 2024 Italy–Africa Summit
- 2024 – 2024 South Korea–Africa Summit
- 2026 – 2026 Russia–Africa Summit

=== Arab League summits ===
- 1974 – Rabat summit conference
- 2002 – Beirut Summit

=== Earth Summits ===
- 1992 – Earth Summit, Rio de Janeiro, Brazil
- 2002 – Earth Summit, Johannesburg, South Africa,
- 2012 – Earth Summit, Rio de Janeiro, Brazil

=== G–summits ===
Group of Six (G6), heads of government

- 1975 – 1st G6 summit, Château de Rambouillet

Group of Seven (G7), heads of government

- 1976 – 2nd G7 summit, San Juan
- 1977 – 3rd G7 summit, London
- 1978 – 4th G7 summit, Bonn
- 1979 – 5th G7 summit, Tokyo
- 1980 – 6th G7 summit, Venice
- 1981 – 7th G7 summit, Montebello
- 1982 – 8th G7 summit, Versailles
- 1983 – 9th G7 summit, Williamsburg
- 1984 – 10th G7 summit, London
- 1985 – 11th G7 summit, Bonn
- 1986 – 12th G7 summit, Tokyo
- 1987 – 13th G7 summit, Venice
- 1988 – 14th G7 summit, Toronto
- 1989 – 15th G7 summit, Grande Arche
- 1990 – 16th G7 summit, Houston
- 1991 – 17th G7 summit, London
- 1992 – 18th G7 summit, Munich
- 1993 – 19th G7 summit, Tokyo
- 1994 – 20th G7 summit, Naples
- 1995 – 21st G7 summit, Halifax
- 1996 – 22nd G7 summit, Lyon

Group of Eight (G8), heads of government

- 1997 – 23rd G8 summit, Denver
- 1998 – 24th G8 summit, Birmingham
- 1999 – 25th G8 summit, Cologne
- 2000 – 26th G8 summit, Okinawa
- 2001 – 27th G8 summit, Genoa
- 2002 – 28th G8 summit, Kananaskis, Alberta
- 2003 – 29th G8 summit, Évian-les-Bains
- 2004 – 30th G8 summit, Sea Island, Georgia
- 2005 – 31st G8 summit, Gleneagles
- 2006 – 32nd G8 summit, Saint Petersburg
- 2007 – 33rd G8 summit, Heiligendamm
- 2008 – 34th G8 summit, Tōyako
- 2009 – 35th G8 summit, L'Aquila, Abruzzo
- 2010 – 36th G8 summit, Huntsville, Ontario
- 2011 – 37th G8 summit, Deauville
- 2012 – 38th G8 summit, Camp David, Maryland
- 2013 – 39th G8 summit, Lough Erne in County Fermanagh

Group of Seven (G7), heads of government

- 2014 – 40th G7 summit, Brussels
- 2015 – 41st G7 summit, Schloss Elmau, Bavaria
- 2016 – 42nd G7 summit, Shima, Mie Prefecture
- 2017 – 43rd G7 summit, Taormina, Sicily
- 2018 – 44th G7 summit, La Malbaie, Quebec
- 2019 – 45th G7 summit, Biarritz, Nouvelle-Aquitaine
- 2021 – 47th G7 summit, Cornwall, South West England
- 2022 – 48th G7 summit, Schloss Elmau, Bavaria
- 2023 – 49th G7 summit, Hiroshima
- 2024 – 50th G7 summit, Fasano, Apulia
- 2025 – 51st G7 summit, Kananaskis, Alberta
- 2026 – 52nd G7 summit, Évian-les-Bains

Group of Twenty (G20), heads of government

- 2008 G-20 Washington summit
- 2009 G-20 London summit
- 2009 G-20 Pittsburgh summit
- 2010 G-20 Toronto summit
- 2010 G-20 Seoul summit
- 2011 G-20 Cannes summit
- 2012 G-20 Los Cabos Summit
- 2013 G-20 Saint Petersburg summit
- 2014 G-20 Brisbane summit
- 2015 G-20 Antalya summit
- 2016 G-20 Hangzhou summit
- 2017 G-20 Hamburg summit
- 2018 G-20 Buenos Aires summit
- 2019 G-20 Osaka summit
- 2020 G-20 Riyadh summit
- 2021 G-20 Rome summit
- 2022 G-20 Bali summit
- 2023 G-20 New Delhi summit
- 2024 G-20 Rio de Janeiro summit
- 2025 G-20 Johannesburg summit
- 2026 G-20 Miami summit

=== European summits ===
- 1969 – The Hague: Foreign policy and enlargement.
- 1974 – Paris: Creation of the Council.
- 1985 – Milan: The initiating of the IGC which leads to the Single European Act.
- 1991 – Maastricht: Agreement on the Maastricht Treaty.
- 1997 – Amsterdam: Agreement on the Amsterdam Treaty.
- 1998 – Brussels: Selected member states to adopt the euro.
- 1999 – Cologne: Declaration on military forces.
- 1999 – Tampere: Institutional reform.
- 2000 – Lisbon: Lisbon Strategy.
- 2002 – Copenhagen: Agreement for May 2004 enlargement.
- 2007 – Lisbon: Agreement on the Lisbon Treaty.

=== European Political Community summits ===
- 2022 – 1st EPC Summit, Czechia
- 2023 – 2nd EPC Summit, Moldova
- 2023 – 3rd EPC Summit, Spain
- 2024 – 4th EPC Summit, United Kingdom
- 2024 – 5th EPC Summit, Hungary
- 2025 – 6th EPC Summit, Albania
- 2025 – 7th EPC Summit, Denmark
- 2026 – 8th EPC Summit, Armenia
- 2026 – 9th EPC Summit, Ireland

=== European Union–African Union Summits ===
- 2000 – 1st European Union–African Union Summit
- 2007 – 2nd European Union–African Union Summit
- 2010 – 3rd European Union–African Union Summit
- 2014 – 4th European Union–African Union Summit
- 2017 – 5th European Union–African Union Summit
- 2022 – 6th European Union–African Union Summit
- 2025 – 7th European Union–African Union Summit

=== Global AI Summit series ===
- 2023 – AI Safety Summit 2023, United Kingdom
- 2024 – AI Seoul Summit 2024, South Korea
- 2025 – AI Action Summit 2025, France
- 2026 – India AI Impact Summit 2026, India

=== Inter-Korean summits ===
- 2000 – 1st Korean summit
- 2007 – 2nd Korean summit
- 2018 – April 2018 inter-Korean summit
- 2018 – May 2018 inter-Korean summit
- 2018 – September 2018 inter-Korean summit
- 2019 – 2019 Koreas–United States DMZ Summit

=== Millennium Development Goals ===
- 2000 – Millennium Summit, New York City
- 2005 – 2005 World Summit, New York City

=== Nuclear Security Summits ===
- 2010 – 2010 Nuclear Security Summit
- 2012 – 2012 Nuclear Security Summit
- 2014 – 2014 Nuclear Security Summit
- 2016 – 2016 Nuclear Security Summit

=== South American Summits ===
- 2000 – 2000 South American Summit, Brasília, Brazil
- 2002 – South American Summit, Guayaquil, Ecuador
- 2004 – 2004 South American Summit, Cuzco, Peru
- 2023 – 2023 South American Summit, Brasília, Brazil

=== Summits of the Americas ===
- 1994 – 1st Summit of the Americas at Miami in the United States.
- 1996 – Summit of the Americas on Sustainable Development at Santa Cruz de la Sierra in Bolivia.
- 1998 – 2nd Summit of the Americas at Santiago in Chile.
- 2001 – 3rd Summit of the Americas, in Quebec City in Canada.
- 2004 – Monterrey Special Summit of the Americas at Monterrey in Mexico.
- 2005 – 4th Summit of the Americas at Mar del Plata in Argentina.
- 2009 – 5th Summit of the Americas at Port-of-Spain in Trinidad and Tobago.
- 2012 – 6th Summit of the Americas at Cartagena in Colombia.
- 2015 – 7th Summit of the Americas at Panama City in Panama.
- 2018 – 8th Summit of the Americas at Lima in Peru.
- 2022 – 9th Summit of the Americas at Los Angeles in the United States.

=== UN international conferences on Afghanistan ===
- 2001 – International Conference on Afghanistan in Bonn
- 2004 – International Conference on Afghanistan in Berlin
- 2006 – International Conference on Afghanistan in London
- 2007 – International Conference on the Rule of Law in Afghanistan in Rome
- 2008 – International Conference on Afghanistan in Paris
- 2009 – International Conference on Afghanistan in Moscow
- 2009 – International Conference on Afghanistan in The Hague
- 2010 – International Conference on Afghanistan in London

=== Miscellaneous ===
- 1335 – Congress of Visegrád
- 1520 – Field of the Cloth of Gold
- 1808 – Congress of Erfurt
- 1814 - 1815 – Congress of Vienna
- 1919 - 1920 – Paris Peace Conference
- 1938 – Munich Agreement
- 1955 – Geneva Summit
- 1966 – Manila Summit Conference
- 1967 – Glassboro Summit Conference
- 1978 – Camp David Accords
- 1985 – Shamrock Summit
- 1986 – Reykjavík Summit
- 1989 – Malta Summit
- 1990 – World Summit for Children
- 2000 – 2000 Camp David Summit
- 2001 – Agra Summit
- 2001 – Taba Summit
- 2003, 2005 – World Summit on the Information Society
- 2005 – Sharm el-Sheikh Summit of 2005
- 2015 – Valletta Summit on Migration
- 2017 – 2017 Riyadh summit
- 2018 – 2018 Eritrea–Ethiopia summit
- 2018 – 2018 North Korea–United States Singapore Summit
- 2019 – 2019 North Korea–United States Hanoi Summit
- 2022 – 2022 China-Arab States Summit
- 2023 – 2023 France-China Summit
- 2023 – 2023 Brazil–China Summit
- 2024 – June 2024 Ukraine peace summit
- 2025 – February 2025 United States–Russia meeting in Saudi Arabia
- 2025 – 2025 London Summit on Ukraine
- 2025 – 2025 European Union–Central Asia summit
- 2025 – August 2025 White House multilateral meeting on Ukraine
- 2025 – Gaza peace summit
- 2026 – Shield of the Americas Summit
- 2026 – International Space Summit

== See also ==
- ASEAN summit
- Asia-Pacific Economic Cooperation
- BRICS summits
- C5+1
- China-Central Asia Summits
- China–Japan–South Korea trilateral summit
- Francophonie Summits
- Ibero-American Summit
- India–Africa Forum Summit
- NATO summit
- Non-Aligned Movement Summits
- North American Leaders' Summit
- SAARC Summits
- World Governments Summit
