= Group of 33 =

Group of 33 has been used to refer to two different international groupings:

- G33 (industrialized countries), an international grouping that existed briefly in 1999, that superseded the Group of 22 in early 1999, and was itself superseded by the present G-20 major economies later that year
- G33 (developing countries), originally 33 countries; the G33 name stayed the same as new member countries were added
