= Outline of Africa–Europe relations =

Regarding Africa-Europe relations see:

- African military systems (1800–1900)
- Colonisation of Africa
  - Scramble for Africa
- Decolonisation of Africa
- Economic history of Africa
- British diaspora in Africa
  - British West Africa
  - East Africa Protectorate
  - History of Egypt under the British
  - Historiography of the British Empire
  - South Africa–United Kingdom relations
- Foreign relations of the African Union
- Italian Empire
- Organisation internationale de la Francophonie for France
  - African French, on language
  - French colonial empire
  - Belgian colonial empire
- Portuguese Africa (disambiguation)
- Soviet Union-Africa relations
- Yugoslavia and the Organisation of African Unity
- Africa–Nordic relations
