= G33 =

G33, G-33 or G.33 may refer to:

- G33: Civilization is Mind Control (a novel by Lorenzo Rodriguez)
- The former Group of 33 industrialized nations
- The current Group of 33 forum for developing countries that coordinate on trade and economic issues
- The Intel G33 Express Chipset
- Glock 33, a firearm
- A model of Ginetta Cars
- A variant of the Model 33 Beechcraft Bonanza aircraft
