= List of international prime ministerial trips made by Luís Montenegro =

This is a list of international prime ministerial trips made by Luís Montenegro, the current Prime Minister of Portugal since 2 April 2024.

== Summary ==
Montenegro has visited 31 countries and territories during his tenure as prime minister. The number of visits per country where Montenegro has traveled are:

- One visit to Andorra, Canada, Cape Verde, China, Colombia, Croatia, Cyprus, Denmark, Greece, Hungary, Ireland, Italy,Japan, Luxembourg, Macau, Montenegro, Netherlands, São Tomé and Príncipe, Slovakia, Slovenia, Turkey, Ukraine and Vatican City
- Two visits to Angola, Brazil and Switzerland
- Three visits to Spain
- Four visits to France
- Five visits to the United States
- Six visits to Germany
- Nine visits to Belgium

== 2024 ==
Country	Location(s)	Dates	Details
Spain	Madrid	15 April	Met with the prime minister Pedro Sanchez, at Moncloa Palace in Madrid
Belgium	Brussels	17–18 April	Attended extraordinary European Council.
Cape Verde	Praia	20–21 April	Met with Prime Minister Ulisses Correia e Silva.
Germany	Berlin	24 May	Meeting with Chancellor Olaf Scholz.
Switzerland	Geneva, Bern	11–12 June	Met with Portuguese students in Geneva. Met with Swiss president Viola Amherd. The talks in Bern focused on the countries’ close bilateral relations, European policy, the upcoming summit on peace in Ukraine and cooperation between Switzerland and Portugal at multilateral level.
Switzerland	Lucerne	15–16 June	Montenegro attend the June 2024 Ukraine peace summit.
Belgium	Brussels	17 June	Montenegro attended an informal European Council summit.
Germany	Leipzig	18 June	Montenegro watch Portugal vs Czech Republic game of UEFA Euro 2024
Belgium	Brussels	27 June	Montenegro arrives to attend the EU Leaders' Summit in Brussels.
Germany	Frankfurt	1 July	Montenegro watch Portugal vs Slovenia game of UEFA Euro 2024
United States	Washington D.C.	9–11 July	Montenegro attended the 2024 NATO summit
Angola	Luanda	23–25 July	Met with President João Lourenço.
France	Paris	9–10 August	Montenegro attended events at the 2024 Summer Olympics.
United States	New York City	26 September	Attended General debate of the seventy-ninth session of the United Nations General Assembly
Hungary	Budapest	7 November	Montenegro attended the 5th European Political Community Summit.
Brazil	Rio de Janeiro	17–19 November	Montenegro travelled to Rio de Janeiro to attend the G20 summit.

== 2025 ==
Country	Location(s)	Dates	Details
Germany	Berlin	17–18 January	Attended the EPP Leaders’ Retreat. He also met with leader of the opposition and leader of the Christian Democratic Union, Friedrich Merz.
Belgium	Brussels	20–21 March	Montenegro attended a European Council summit.
France	Paris	27 March	Montenegro attended a meeting of the "Coalition of the willing" hosted by President Macron.
Vatican City	Vatican City	26 April	Attended funeral of Pope Francis.
Germany	Munich	8 June	Montenegro watch the 2025 UEFA Nations League final.
Netherlands	The Hague	24–25 June	Montenegro attended the 2025 NATO summit.
Belgium	Brussels	26–27 June	Montenegro attended the European Council meeting. He speaks during a press conference at the EU leaders Summit.
China	Beijing	8-10 September	Montenegro met with President Xi Jinping, Premier Li Qiang, and Zhao Leji.
Macau	Macau	10 September	Montenegro met with Chief Executive Sam Hou Fai.
Japan	Tokyo and Osaka	10-12 September	Montenegro met with Prime Minister Shigeru Ishiba and visited the Portuguese Pavilion at Expo 2025.
Denmark	Copenhagen	2 October	Attended the 7th European Political Community Summit.
Slovenia	Portoroz	20 October	Montenegro attended the Med9 summit hosted by Prime Minister Robert Golob.
Brazil	Belém	7-8 November	Montenegro attended the 2025 United Nations Climate Change Conference.
Colombia	Santa Marta	9 November	Montenegro attended the 4rd EU–CELAC summit.
Angola	Luanda	23-25 November	Montenegro attended the 7th European Union–African Union Summit.
Slovakia	Lešť	19 December	Montenegro met with Portuguese military personnel deployed on a NATO mission. He also met with the deputy prime minister and the minister of defense, Robert Kaliňák.
Ukraine	Kyiv	20 December	Met with President Volodymyr Zelenskyy. He paid the first official visit to Ukraine since taking office. Both leaders signed Joint Statement on the Establishment of a Partnership for the Production of Maritime Unmanned Systems.

== 2026 ==
Country	Location(s)	Dates	Details
France	Paris	6 January	Montenegro attended the Coalition of the Willing meeting in Paris with fellow leaders.
Belgium	Brussels	19 February	Montenegro attended the Extraordinary European Council.
Spain	Huelva	6 March	Montenegro attended the 36th Iberian Summit.
Belgium	Brussels	19–20 March	Montenegro attended the European Council.
Cyprus	Nicosia	23–24 April	Montenegro attended an informal meeting of the European Council summit.
Germany	Berlin	5–6 May	Montenegro met with Chancellor Friedrich Merz and also participated in the Wirtschaftstag Conference.
Andorra	Andorra la Vella	20 May	Montenegro inaugurated the Consulate General of Portugal and participated in a meeting with the Portuguese community residing in the country. It also met with the head of government, Xavier Espot Zamora.
Montenegro	Tivat	4–5 June	Montenegro attended the 2026 EU-Western Balkans summit.
Luxembourg	Luxembourg City	6–8 June	Montenegro paid an official visit to the country at the beginning of the commemorations for the Portugal Day, Camões, and the Portuguese Communities. Met with Grand-Duke Guillaume V and Prime Minister Luc Frieden.
Belgium	Brussels	18-19 June	Montenegro attended the European Council and also the "Friends of Cohesion" meeting.
United States	Houston	23-24 June	Montenegro watched the Portugal vs Uzbekistan game of 2026 FIFA World Cup. He also visited the headquarters of EDP Renewables North America and met with the Portuguese communities.
Canada	Toronto	2-3 July	Montenegro watched the Portugal vs Croatia game of 2026 FIFA World Cup. He also met with the Portuguese communities.
United States	Dallas	6 July	Montenegro watched the Portugal vs Spain game of 2026 FIFA World Cup.
Turkey	Ankara	7-8 July	Montenegro attended the 2026 Ankara NATO summit.
Italy	Rome	20 July	Montenegro had a bilateral meeting with Italian prime minister Giorgia Meloni at Palazzo Chigi.
Greece	Athens	22 July	Montenegro had an official working meeting with Greek prime minister Kyriakos Mitsotakis.
São Tomé and Príncipe	São Tomé	2-3 September	Montenegro attended the inauguration of re-elected President Carlos Vila Nova.
United States	New York City	22-24 September	Montenegro attended the General debate of the eighty-first session of the United Nations General Assembly and also visited the New York Stock Exchange.
France	Strasbourg	6 October	Montenegro participates and speaks at the European Parliament Plenary Session.
Croatia	Split	7 October	Montenegro attended the 13th EU Med Summit.
Belgium	Brussels	15-16 October	Montenegro attended the European Council and also the "Friends of Cohesion" meeting.
Spain	Madrid	4-5 November	Montenegro attended the 30th Ibero-American Summit.
Ireland	Dublin	12 November	Montenegro attended the 9th European Political Community Summit.

== Future trips ==
Country	Location	Date	Details

== Multilateral meetings ==
Luís Montenegro participated in the following summits during his premiership:

Group	Year				
Group	2024	2025	2026	2027	2028
UNGA	26 September, (United States) New York City	23 September, (United States) New York City	22–24 September, (United States) New York City	TBD, (United States) New York City	TBD, (United States) New York City
G20	18–19 November, (Brazil) Rio de Janeiro	Not a G20 Member	Not a G20 Member	TBD	TBD
NATO	9–11 July, (United States) Washington, D.C.	24–25 June, (Netherlands) The Hague	7–8 July, (Turkey) Ankara	TBD, (Albania) Tirana	TBD
EPC	18 July, (United Kingdom) Woodstock	16 May, (Albania) Tirana	4 May, (Armenia) Yerevan	TBD, (Switzerland) TBD	TBD, (Azerbaijan) TBD
EPC	7 November, (Hungary) Budapest	2 October, (Denmark) Copenhagen	12 November, (Republic of Ireland) Dublin	TBD, (Greece) TBD	TBD, (Latvia) TBD
MED9	11 October, (Cyprus) Paphos	20 October, (Slovenia) Portorož	7 October, (Croatia) Split		
COP	12 November, (Azerbaijan) Baku	7–8 November, (Brazil) Belém	9-20 November (Turkey) Antalya	TBD (Ethiopia) Addis Ababa	TBD
EU–CELAC	None	9 November, (Colombia) Santa Marta	None		
Others	Global Peace Summit; 15–16 June, (Switzerland) Lucerne	15 March, (videoconference); United Kingdom	Together for peace and security summit 6 January, (France) Paris	TBA	TBA
Others	Global Peace Summit; 15–16 June, (Switzerland) Lucerne	Building a robust peace for Ukraine and Europe; 27 March, (France) Paris	Together for peace and security summit 6 January, (France) Paris		
██ = Future event ██ = Did not attend
