= 4th European Union–African Union Summit =

Summit between EU and AU held in Brussels on 2 and 3 April 2014

- Host country: Belgium
- Date: 2–3 April 2014
- Cities: Brussels
- Follows: 3rd European Union–African Union Summit
- Precedes: 5th European Union - African Union Summit

The 4th European Union–African Union Summit took place in Brussels on 2 and 3 April 2014. The summit followed previous summits in 2000, 2007 and 2010 all of which embodied increasingly institutionalized relations between EU and AU. More than 60 EU and African leaders and 90 delegations participated in the event at which issues of democracy, human rights, rule of law and development were discussed. The theme of the event was "Investing in People, Prosperity and Peace". Disputes between participants over who should and should not be invited marked the summit's organization stage.

== See also ==
- 2007 Africa–EU Summit
- Foreign relations of the European Union
