= G22 =

G22 may refer to:

== Firearms ==
- G22 Sniper Rifle, used by the German Armed Forces
- Glock 22, a semi-automatic pistol
- Walther G22, a semi-automatic rifle

== Other uses ==
- BMW 4 Series (G22), an automobile
- EMD G22 Series, an American diesel locomotive
- G22 Qingdao–Lanzhou Expressway in China
- Group of 22, an international forum addressing economic issues
- Grumman G-22 Gulfhawk II, an American aircraft
- G22, a fictional group in the video game Alpha Protocol
- G22 (Filipino girl group), a Filipino girl group
