= Foreign relations of the African Union =

The individual member states of the African Union (AU) coordinate foreign policy through this agency, in addition to conducting their own international relations on a state-by-state basis. The AU represents the interests of African peoples at large in intergovernmental organizations (IGO's); for instance, it is a permanent observer at the United Nations' General Assembly.

== Other intergovernmental organizations ==
Membership of the AU overlaps with other IGO's, and occasionally these third-party organizations and the AU will coordinate matters of public policy.

=== Political ===
Non-Aligned Movement (Every AU member state, except the Sahrawi Arab Democratic Republic)

Commonwealth of Nations:

- Botswana
- Cameroon
- Eswatini
- Gabon
- The Gambia
- Ghana
- Kenya
- Lesotho
- Malawi
- Mauritius
- Mozambique
- Namibia
- Nigeria
- Rwanda
- Seychelles
- Sierra Leone
- South Africa
- Tanzania
- Togo
- Uganda
- Zambia

=== Regional ===
Arab League:

- Egypt
- Sudan
- Libya
- Morocco
- Tunisia
- Algeria
- Mauritania
- Somalia
- Djibouti
- Comoros
- Eritrea

Arab Maghreb Union:

- Algeria
- Libya
- Mauritania
- Morocco
- Tunisia

Community of Sahel-Saharan States:

- Libya
- Burkina Faso
- Mali
- Niger
- Chad
- Sudan
- Central African Republic
- Eritrea
- Djibouti
- The Gambia
- Senegal
- Benin
- Ivory Coast
- Egypt
- Ghana
- Guinea-Bissau
- Liberia
- Morocco
- Nigeria
- Sierra Leone
- Somalia
- Togo
- Tunisia

Conseil de l'Entente:

- Benin
- Burkina Faso
- Ivory Coast
- Niger
- Togo

=== Economic ===
Greater Arab Free Trade Area:

- Algeria
- Egypt
- Libya
- Morocco
- Sudan
- Tunisia

Economic Community of the Great Lakes Countries:

- Burundi
- D.R. Congo
- Rwanda

G20 developing nations:

- Egypt
- Nigeria
- South Africa
- Tanzania
- Zimbabwe

G-20 major economies:

- South Africa

G33:

- Benin
- Botswana
- Democratic Republic of Congo
- Ivory Coast
- Kenya
- Mauritius
- Madagascar
- Mozambique
- Nigeria
- Senegal
- Tanzania
- Uganda
- Zambia
- Zimbabwe

G90:

- Angola
- Benin
- Botswana
- Burkina Faso
- Burundi
- Cameroon
- Central African Republic
- Chad
- Rep. Congo
- Democratic Republic of the Congo
- Djibouti
- Egypt
- Eswatini
- Gabon
- The Gambia
- Ghana
- Guinea
- Guinea Bissau
- Ivory Coast
- Kenya
- Lesotho
- Madagascar
- Malawi
- Mali
- Mauritania
- Mauritius
- Morocco
- Mozambique
- Namibia
- Niger
- Nigeria
- Rwanda
- Senegal
- Sierra Leone
- South Africa
- Tanzania
- Tunisia
- Uganda
- Zambia
- Zimbabwe

Group of 77:

- Algeria
- Angola
- Benin
- Botswana
- Burkina Faso
- Burundi
- Cameroon
- Cape Verde
- Central African Republic
- Chad
- Comoros
- Republic of the Congo
- Democratic Republic of the Congo
- Djibouti
- Egypt
- Equatorial Guinea
- Eritrea
- Eswatini
- Ethiopia
- Gabon
- The Gambia
- Ghana
- Guinea
- Guinea-Bissau
- Ivory Coast
- Kenya
- Lesotho
- Liberia
- Libya
- Madagascar
- Malawi
- Mali
- Mauritania
- Mauritius
- Morocco
- Mozambique
- Namibia
- Niger
- Nigeria
- Rwanda
- São Tomé and Príncipe
- Senegal
- Sierra Leone
- Somalia
- South Africa
- Sudan
- Tunisia
- Uganda
- Tanzania
- Zambia
- Zimbabwe

Indian Ocean Commission:

- Comoros
- Madagascar
- Mauritius
- Seychelles

Liptako–Gourma Authority:

- Burkina Faso
- Mali
- Niger

Mano River Union:

- Guinea
- Ivory Coast
- Liberia
- Sierra Leone

OPEC:

- Algeria
- Libya
- Nigeria

=== Linguistic ===
Community of Portuguese Language Countries:

- Angola
- Cape Verde
- Guinea-Bissau
- Mozambique
- São Tomé and Príncipe

Organisation internationale de la Francophonie:

- Benin
- Burkina Faso
- Burundi
- Cameroon
- Cape Verde
- Central African Republic
- Chad
- Comoros
- Congo, Democratic Republic of the
- Congo, Republic of
- Ivory Coast
- Djibouti
- Egypt
- Equatorial Guinea
- Gabon
- Ghana
- Guinea
- Guinea-Bissau
- Madagascar
- Mali
- Mauritania
- Mauritius
- Morocco
- Niger
- Rwanda
- São Tomé and Príncipe
- Senegal
- Seychelles
- Togo
- Tunisia

Organization of Ibero-American States:

- Equatorial Guinea

=== Religious ===
Organisation of Islamic Cooperation:

- Algeria
- Benin
- Burkina Faso
- Cameroon
- Chad
- Comoros
- Djibouti
- Egypt
- Gabon
- The Gambia
- Guinea
- Guinea-Bissau
- Ivory Coast
- Libya
- Mali
- Mauritania
- Morocco
- Mozambique
- Niger
- Nigeria
- Senegal
- Sierra Leone
- Sudan
- Somalia
- Tunisia
- Uganda

== Diplomatic missions ==
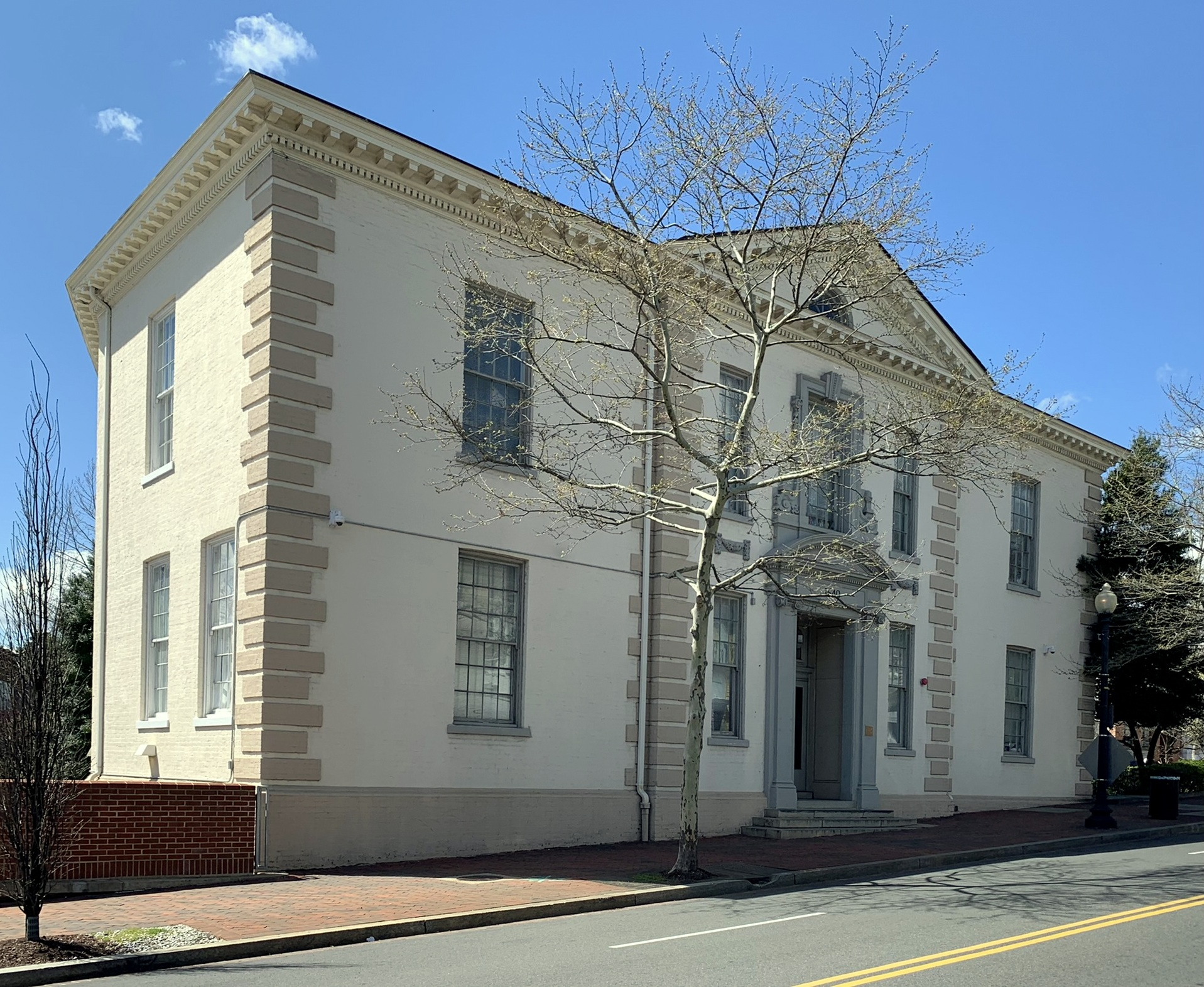
African Union Representational Mission to the U.S. in Washington, D.C.

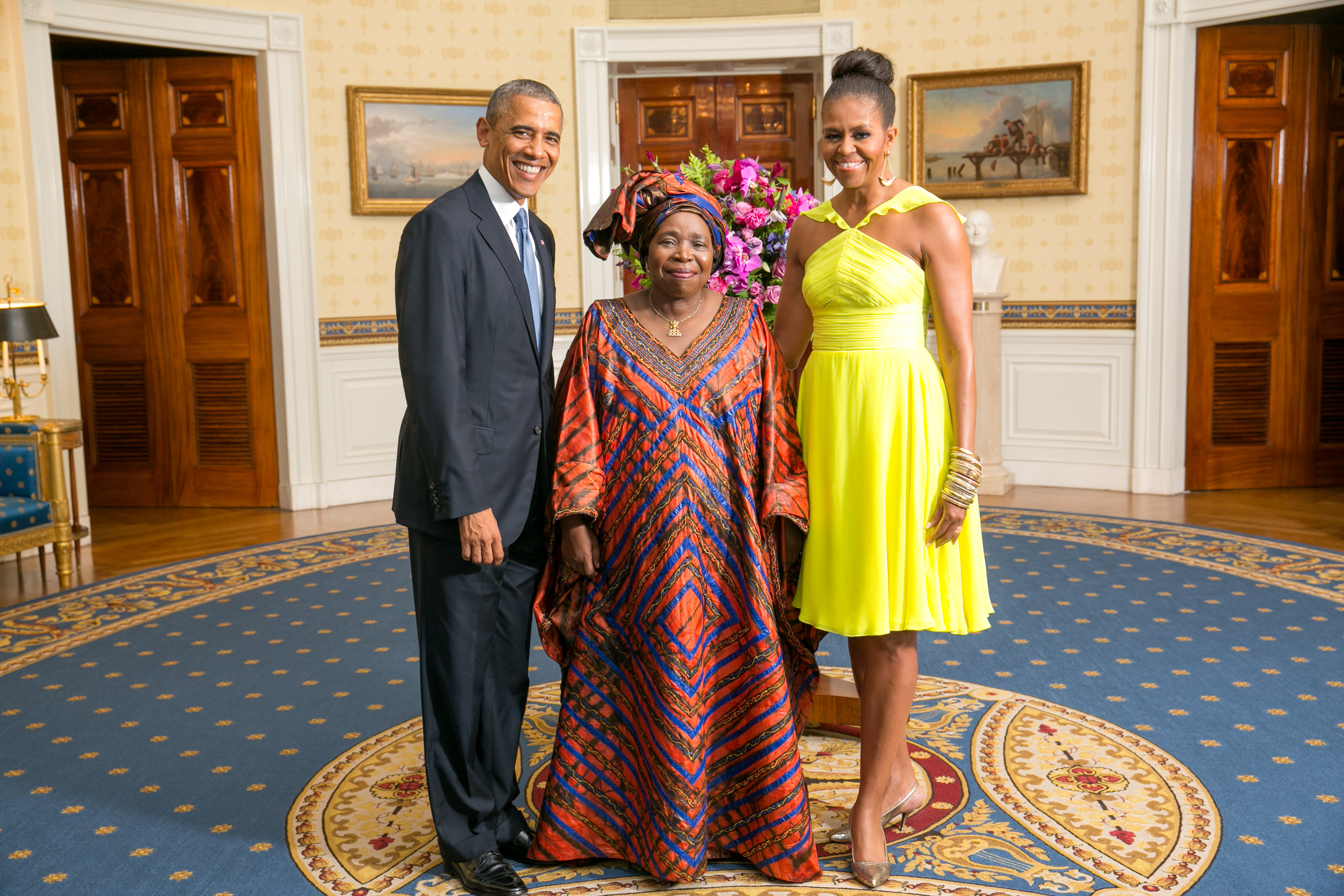
Barack Obama greets Nkosazana Clarice Dlamini Zuma, Chairman of the African Union, Blue Room during a U.S.–Africa Leaders Summit dinner at the White House, Aug. 5, 2014. White House photo by Amanda Lucidon.

The African Union maintains special diplomatic representation with the United States, European Union, and as of 2022 has plans for a mission to the People's Republic of China. In 2011, the United States Mission to the African Union donated a state of the art multimedia box to the cash-starved African Union in a formal ceremony, in which they also presented new interns who will be trained to use it.

== Foreign relations of constituent states ==
- Algeria
- Angola
- Benin
- Botswana
- Burkina Faso
- Burundi
- Cameroon
- Cape Verde
- Central African Republic
- Chad
- Comoros
- D. R. Congo
- Rep. of the Congo
- Djibouti
- Egypt
- Equatorial Guinea
- Eritrea
- Eswatini
- Ethiopia
- Gabon
- The Gambia
- Ghana
- Guinea
- Guinea-Bissau
- Ivory Coast
- Kenya
- Lesotho
- Liberia
- Libya
- Madagascar
- Malawi
- Mali
- Mauritania
- Mauritius
- Morocco
- Mozambique
- Namibia
- Niger
- Nigeria
- Rwanda
- Sahrawi Arab Democratic Republic
- São Tomé and Príncipe
- Senegal
- Seychelles
- Sierra Leone
- Somalia
- South Africa
- South Sudan
- Sudan
- Tanzania
- Togo
- Tunisia
- Uganda
- Zambia
- Zimbabwe

== See also ==
- Enlargement of the African Union
- Africa–Canada relations
- Africa–China relations
- Africa–Europe relations
- France–Africa relations
- Africa–India relations
- Africa–Japan relations
- Africa–Nordic relations
- Africa–North Korea relations
- Africa-South Korea relations
- Africa–Soviet Union relations
- Africa–United States relations
- Yugoslavia and the Organisation of African Unity
