= List of international presidential trips made by Mohamed Ould Ghazouani =

This is a list of international presidential trips made by Mohamed Ould Ghazouani, the 9th President of Mauritania, since taking office on 1 August 2019.

== 2019 ==
Country	Areas visited	Date(s)	Notes
Burkina Faso	Ouagadougou	13–14 September	First international trip as president.
Russia	Sochi	23–24 October	Attended the 2019 Russia–Africa Summit.
Senegal	Dakar	18–19 November	Met with President Macky Sall.

== 2020 ==
Country	Areas visited	Date(s)	Notes
France	Paris	13–17 January	First European tour as president.
United Kingdom	London	19–20 January	Continuation of his European tour.
United Arab Emirates	Abu Dhabi	2–3 February	State visit. The UAE pledged $2 billion for Mauritanian development projects.
Saudi Arabia	Riyadh	26–29 February	Met with King Salman.

== 2021 ==
Country	Areas visited	Date(s)	Notes
Belgium	Brussels	14 January	State visit. Held discussions with the President of the European Council, Charles Michel. Met with the Secretary General of NATO, Jens Stoltenberg.
Niger	Niamey	1–2 April	Attended the inauguration ceremony of President Mohamed Bazoum.
France	Paris	17–18 May	Attended the Summit on the Financing of African Economies.
Saudi Arabia	Medina	20–25 August	Visited the Prophet's Mosque.
United Kingdom	London	31 October – 2 November	State visit. Participated in the 26th UN Climate Change Conference of the Parties (COP26).
Saudi Arabia	Jeddah	23–25 November	Official visit. Held talks with Saudi officials.
Algeria	Algiers	27–29 December	State visit. Met with President Abdelmadjid Tebboune.

== 2022 ==
Country	Areas visited	Date(s)	Notes
Ethiopia	Addis Ababa	3–6 February	Attended the 35th African Union Summit.
Spain	Madrid	16–18 March	State visit. Met with several Spanish politicians and discussed various conflicts happening around the world from the Mali Civil War to the Russian Invasion of Ukraine.
Ivory Coast	Abidjan	9 May	Attended the 15th session of the Conference of the Parties for the United Nations Convention to Combat Desertification (UNCCD).
Egypt	Cairo	6–8 November	State visit. Participated in the work of the United Nations Climate Change Conference (COP 27).
Italy	Rome	1–3 December	State visit. Met with Prime Minister Giorgia Meloni.
Saudi Arabia	Riyadh	7–9 December	State visit. Met with the President of China Xi Jinping during the China-Arab states summit.
United States	Washington, D.C.	13–15 December	Attended the 2022 United States–Africa Leaders Summit.

== 2023 ==
Country	Areas visited	Date(s)	Notes
Saudi Arabia	Jeddah	18–19 May	State visit.
Egypt	Cairo	4–6 June	Working visit.
Spain	Madrid	20 June	State visit. Held talks with King Felipe VI on efforts to counter terrorism and extremism in West Africa and the Sahel.
France	Paris	22–23 June	Attended the Summit for a New Global Financing Pact.
China	Beijing	28–30 July	State visit. Met with Chinese Premier Li Qiang.
Nigeria	Abuja	9–10 August	Attended an ECOWAS summit.
United States	New York City	18–26 September	Attended the 78th session of the United Nations General Assembly.
Belgium	Brussels	24 October	State visit.
Saudi Arabia	Medina	12–13 November	Official visit to the Prophet’s Mosque.
United Arab Emirates	Abu Dhabi, Dubai	30 November – 5 December	Attended COP28.

== 2024 ==
Country	Areas visited	Date(s)	Notes
Ethiopia	Addis Ababa	16–19 February	Attended the 37th African Union Summit.
Algeria	Algiers	22 February	State visit. Met with President Abdelmadjid Tebboune.
Switzerland	Geneva	26–28 May	Official visit to the WHO.
France	Paris	28–29 May	Working visit. Met with President Emmanuel Macron.
China	Beijing	6 September	Attended the 2024 Forum on China–Africa Cooperation.
United States	New York City	21–24 September	Attended the 79th session of the United Nations General Assembly.
France	Paris	2–5 October	Attended the 19th Francophonie Summit.
Libya	Tripoli	10–11 October	Working visit. Met with Mohamed al-Menfi, Chairman of the Presidential Council, and Prime Minister Abdul Hamid Dbeibeh to discuss Libya's national reconciliation process and efforts to achieve peace and political stability.
Russia	Kazan	22–24 October	Attended the 16th BRICS summit.
Saudi Arabia	Riyadh	9–11 November	State visit.
Azerbaijan	Baku	11 November	Attended COP29.
Morocco	Rabat	19 December	Official visit. Met with King Mohammed VI.

== 2025 ==
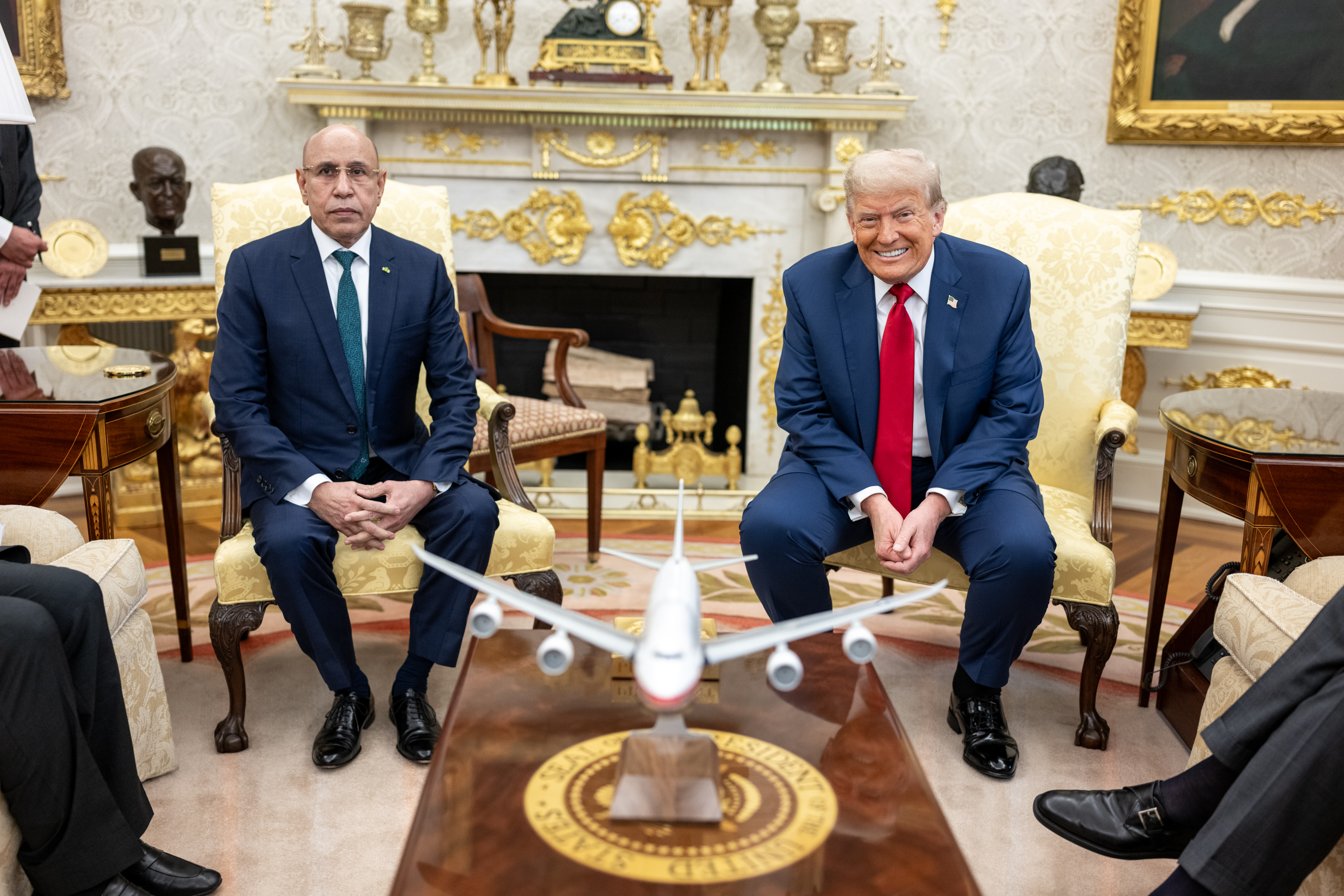
President Donald Trump greets President Mohamed Ould Cheikh El Ghazouani of Mauritania in the Oval Office, before having a multilateral luncheon with African leaders.

Country	Areas visited	Date(s)	Notes
Saudi Arabia	Medina	31 May	Official visit to the Prophet’s Mosque.
United States	Washington, D.C.	9–11 July	Attended a US–Africa mini-summit hosted by President Donald Trump.
Saudi Arabia	Medina	15–16 September	Official visit to the Prophet’s Mosque.
Saudi Arabia	Medina	24–27 October	Official visit to the Prophet’s Mosque.
Angola	Luanda	24–25 November	Attended the 7th European Union–African Union Summit.

== 2026 ==
Country	Areas visited	Date(s)	Notes
Belgium	Brussels	24–26 March	State visit.
France	Paris	14–17 April	State visit. Met with President Emmanuel Macron.
United Arab Emirates	Abu Dhabi	25–26 April	Official visit that underscored the deepening strategic partnership between the two countries at a time of heightened regional tension.
Saudi Arabia	Medina	27–28 April	Official visit to the Prophet’s Mosque.
Qatar	Doha	14 July	Received by Amir Tamim bin Hamad Al Thani.
Russia	Moscow	27–29 October	Attended the 3rd Russia–Africa Summit. Took part in the opening plenary session and in the heads of state sessions a day early.
Senegal	Dakar	31 October – 1 November	Attended the Dakar 2026 Summit on Sport and Sustainable Development.
Turkey	Antalya	10 November – Present	Currently attending the COP31 Leaders' Summit.
