= Morocco–Russia relations =

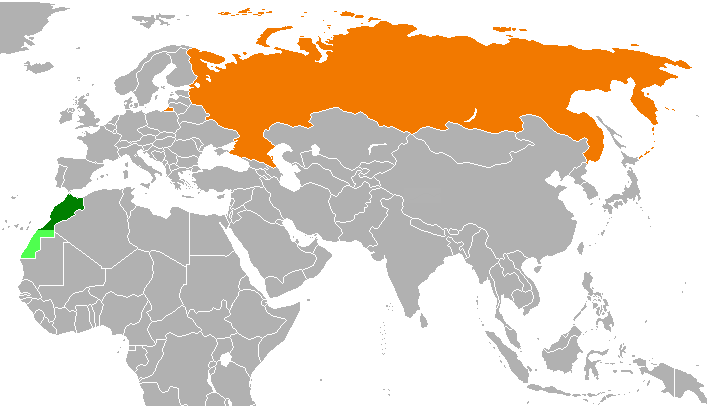
- Morocco: Russia

Diplomatic mission
- Embassy of Morocco, Moscow: Embassy of Russia, Rabat

Morocco–Russia relations (Arabic: العلاقات المغربية الروسية, Russian: Российско-марокканские отношения) are the bilateral relations between the Kingdom of Morocco and the Russian Federation. Morocco has an embassy in Moscow, while Russia has an embassy in Rabat and a consulate general in Casablanca. Russia and Morocco currently enjoy a very good, rapidly improving relationship.

== History ==
=== Imperial period ===
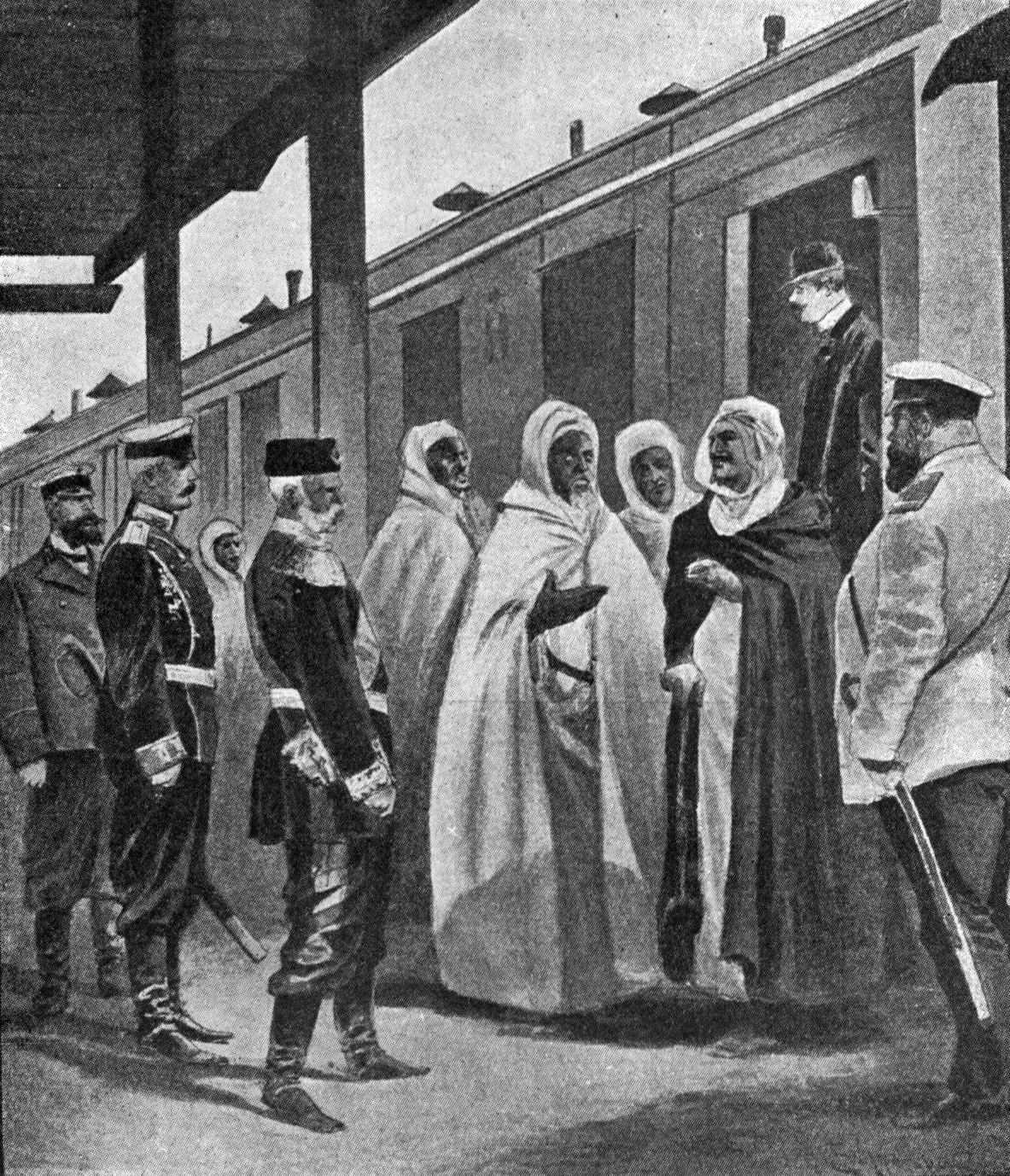
Moroccan embassy in Moscow in 1901.

Bilateral relations between Russia and Morocco have traditionally been very good since the 18th century. Then the mutual relations began with the exchange of goods between the empires of Sultan Mohammed Ben Abdallah and Empress Catherine II. In 1897, the Russian Empire established a consulate in Tangier. In 1906, Arthur Cassini participated in the Algeciras Conference as the representative of the Russian Empire. The Russian delegation supported the French position unequivocally in the First Moroccan Crisis. In the late Tsarist years, Russia supported the French colonial position in Morocco.

=== Soviet period ===
In the course of the 1920s, the Soviet-sponsored Comintern supported Jacques Doriots' (then a communist) campaign against the French colonial presence in Morocco. Additionally, in the 1920s and the 1930s, the Soviet Union did not sign the Tangier Protocol.

During the Cold War, Morocco was one of the Soviet Union's most important trading partners in Africa.

In the early 1960s, Soviet-Moroccan relations were developing very well. During the 1964 Moscow protest, approximately 50 Moroccan students broke into the embassy of Morocco in the Soviet Union in Moscow and staged an all‐day sit-in protesting against death sentences handed down by a Moroccan court in Rabat.

In 1978, the Soviet Union invested heavily in the mining industry of Morocco.

In the context of Western Sahara War, Moscow backed "the inalienable rights of the population of Western Sahara to self-determination". King Hassan II of Morocco said in 1980 that Morocco and the Soviet Union are "at war" in the sense that Soviet arms were supplied to Algeria, which were being shipped by Algeria to the Polisario Front.

== Current relations ==
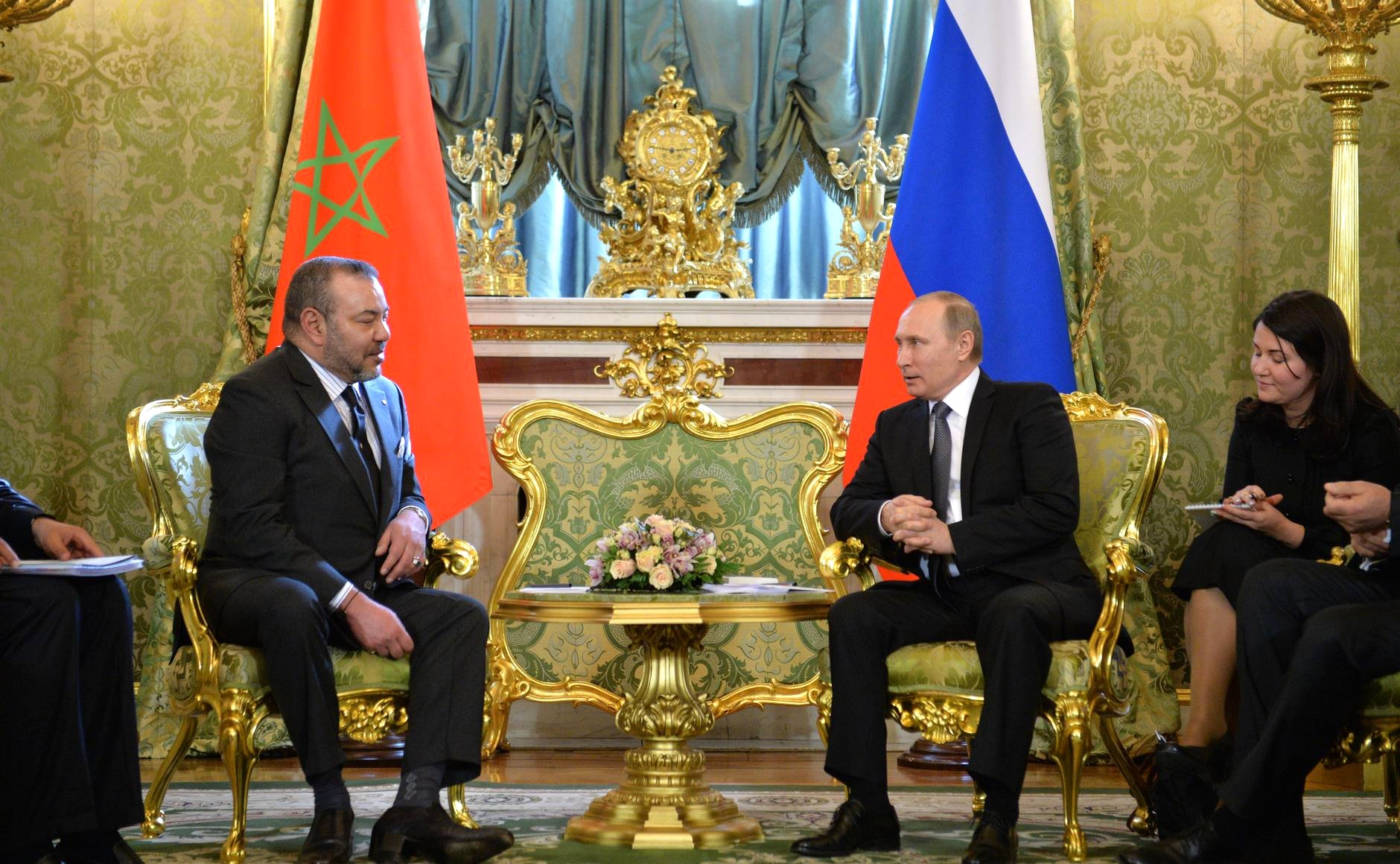
Moroccan King Mohammed VI with Russian President Vladimir Putin in 2016.

In the 2000s, the bilateral trade relations widened significantly, especially in the mining and agriculture sector.

The current President, Vladimir Putin, paid a visit to Morocco in September 2006 in order to boost economic and military ties between Russia and Morocco. Moroccan-Russian relations are still in constant development, while trade between the two countries reached over 2 billion dollars in 2011. In March 2016, King Mohammed VI of Morocco visited Russia and met with President Putin. Both sides signed an agreement on mutual protection of secret information.

After a significant decline in tourism from Europe, the Ministry of Tourism of Morocco is planning to attract more travelers from Russia.

In 2019, the Moroccan and the Russian government agreed on investing into an oil refinery in Mohammedia, that was defunct since 2015. So equipped with a refining capacity of around 100,000 barrels per day, the refinery should later be able to reach 200,000 barrels per day by exploiting the Nador Port facilities. This expansion promises to deliver a number of trickle-down effects, including boosting job creation and infrastructure development, particularly in Morocco's northern regions.

Morocco and the Russia signed a new fisheries cooperation agreement in 2020, after a former agreement signed in 2016, expired in March. The new agreement, spanning 4 years, is the 8th of its kind since 1992, and establishes the legal framework allowing a fleet of 10 Russian vessels to fish for small pelagic species in Moroccan waters beyond 15 nautical miles.

During the coronavirus pandemic, the cooperation between Morocco and the Russian Federation was highlighted after the approval of the Sputnik V vaccine in January 2021.

Russians are able to visit Morocco without a visa for 90 days, boosting the tourism sector in Morocco.

=== During Russo-Ukrainian war ===
Morocco chose not to participate in the UN vote that condemned the Russian invasion of Ukraine, Morocco said it was concerned about the military escalation in Ukraine, emphasizing that it encourages all initiatives and actions promoting a peaceful settlement of conflicts; additionally, 37% of Moroccans want to keep ties with Russia.

A former Moroccan prisoner of war who has naturalized Ukrainian citizenship was sentenced to death by a Donetsk People's Republic court, but later released in a prisoner exchange brokered by Saudi Arabia.

On 20 December 2023, the 6th Russian-Arab Cooperation forum took place in Marrakesh, Morocco.

== Diplomatic missions ==
Russia has an embassy in Rabat, and a consular office in Casablanca. Morocco is represented in Russia by its embassy to Moscow.

== See also ==
- Foreign relations of Russia
  - Africa–Soviet Union relations
- Foreign relations of Morocco
- List of ambassadors of Russia to Morocco
- List of ambassadors of Morocco to Russia
