= G90 =

The G90, otherwise known as the Group of 90, is an alliance between the poorest and smallest developing countries, many of whom are part of the World Trade Organization (WTO). The G90 emerged as a strong grouping at the WTO’s Ministerial conference at Cancun in September 2003, taking common positions representing the largest number of countries, with 64 of the 90 countries in the G90 being members of the WTO. It is the largest trading body in the WTO, and it was formed as an umbrella body including the African, Caribbean and Pacific Group (ACP), the African Union, and the group of Least Developed Countries (LDC).

== Objectives ==
The driving force for the formation of the G90 was the lack of economic power faced by poor and small nations to enact resolutions in trade disputes, as envisioned by the WTO. G90 nations, unable to enforce or afford countervailing measures, or compete with the subsidized economies of wealthier nations, formed the trade block in order to ensure a collective voice on issues of importance to landlocked and island economies, less developed countries, and commodity-dependent nations. Primarily, they want preferential domestic subsidies by the European Union and the United States to be removed in order to allow G90 products greater access to foreign markets.

Together with the G20 and the G33, the G90 aims to counterbalance the power of the United States and European economies in directing global trade, particularly with respect to negotiations over agricultural goods, upon which most of the G90 economies depend.

== Membership ==
- African Union (AU)
- Organisation of African, Caribbean and Pacific States (OACPS)
- Least-Developed and Other Developing Countries: Angola, Bangladesh, Benin, Botswana, Burkina Faso, Burundi, Cambodia, Cameroon, Central African Republic, Chad, Republic of Congo, Côte d'Ivoire, Cuba, Democratic Republic of the Congo, Djibouti, Egypt, Eswatini, Fiji, Gabon, Gambia, Ghana, Guinea, Guinea Bissau, Guyana, Haiti, Kenya, Lesotho, Madagascar, Malawi, Maldives, Mali, Mauritania, Mauritius, Morocco, Mozambique, Myanmar, Namibia, Nepal, Niger, Nigeria, Papua New Guinea, Rwanda, Senegal, Sierra Leone, Solomon Islands, South Africa, Tanzania, Togo, Tunisia, Uganda, Zambia, Zimbabwe.

== See also ==
- G8
- G20
- G33
- World Trade Organization
