= Group of 22 =

The Group of 22 (G22 or Willard Group) was announced by the leaders of APEC (Asia–Pacific Economic Cooperation) in 1997. The intention was to convene a number of meetings between finance ministers and central bank governors to make proposals on reform of the global financial system. The Group of 22 comprised members of the then-G8 (which became the G7—without Russia—in 2014), and 14 other countries. It first met in 1998 in Washington, D.C., US, to consider the stability of the international financial system and capital markets. In 1999, it was superseded by the Group of 33, which itself was superseded by the Group of 20 (G-20) later that year.

Hong Kong, Singapore, Malaysia and Thailand were members of the G22, but are not members of the G20. The European Union, Turkey and Saudi Arabia are members of the G20, but were not members of the G22. Poland was a member of the G22, but is only represented in the G20 through the EU seat.

== Members ==
G8 nations The additional 14 nations

G8 Nations:

- Canada
- France
- Germany
- Italy
- Japan
- Russia
- United Kingdom
- United States

Other 14 nations or regions:

- Argentina
- Australia
- Brazil
- China
- Hong Kong
- India
- Indonesia
- Malaysia
- Mexico
- Poland
- Singapore
- South Africa
- South Korea
- Thailand
