= Africa–Soviet Union relations =

Africa–Soviet relations
- AU: Soviet Union

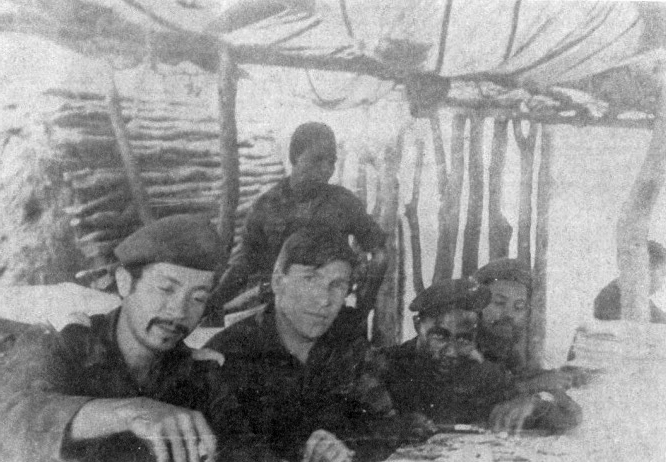
Soviet military instructors with Namibian guerrillas during the South African Border War, late 1970s.

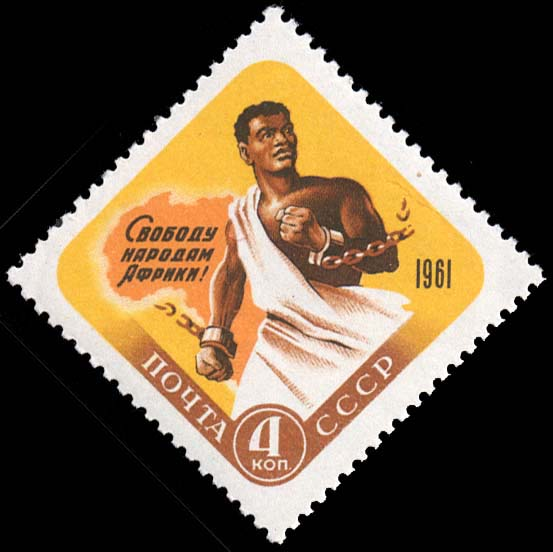
1961 Soviet stamp with slogan "Freedom to the nations of Africa!

Africa–Soviet Union relations were the diplomatic, political, military, and cultural relationships between the Soviet Union and Africa from 1945 to 1991. The Soviets offered financial aid, munitions, and credits for purchases from the Soviet bloc, while avoiding direct involvement in armed conflicts. Temporary alliances were secured with Angola and Ethiopia. The 1991 dissolution of the Soviet Union left its successor state, the Russian Federation, with greatly diminished influence in the continent.

== Overview ==
Vladimir Lenin argued in his work Imperialism, the Highest Stage of Capitalism that imperialism was inherently caused by capitalism, and the inaugural session of the Comintern in 1919 included a declaration of solidarity for "the colonial slaves of Africa and Asia." However, most of its attempts to spread Communism were initially focused on Europe; Africa did not appear ready for revolution because it was almost entirely controlled by European imperial powers, with the peasantry under the political control of tribal leaders, and the absence of an industrial Proletariat.

After 1953, the continent underwent a rapid process of decolonization, whereby nearly all the colonies became independent nations. However, the African nationalist movement was led by the better educated young middle-class, which had little exposure to communism or socialism. Soviet leaders, beginning with Nikita Khrushchev, were excited by the enthusiastic young black Africans who first came to Moscow for a major youth festival in 1957. Patrice Lumumba Peoples' Friendship University was established in Moscow in 1960 to provide higher education to students from developing countries. It became an integral part of the Soviet cultural movement in nonaligned countries.

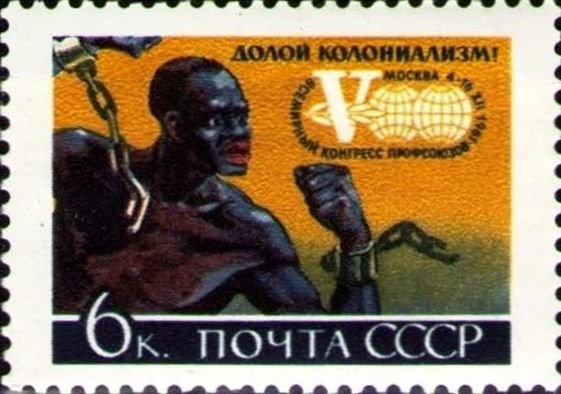
1961 Soviet stamp marking the 5th World Congress of Trade Unions, showing an African breaking chains.

The Kremlin saw an opportunity, and established four foreign policy goals regarding Africa. First it wanted a lasting presence on the continent, including port facilities in the Indian Ocean. Second it wanted to gain a voice in African affairs, primarily by supporting local communist parties, and providing economic and military aid to the governments. Third it wanted to undermine Western/NATO influence. However, the Kremlin was reluctant to send Soviet troops because of its fear of a major escalation with NATO powers. Despite this, Fidel Castro sent 300,000 Cuban troops to Africa to support fellow revolutionaries against Western imperialism; although the Kremlin thought Cuba's support was dangerous, it did not prevent it. And finally, after 1962, it was engaged in a bitter controversy with China for influence and control of local radical movements.

Building upon the cornerstones of Marxist-Leninist thought, especially the self-determination and liberation of oppressed nations, as well as anti-imperialism, Khrushchev interpreted the traditional bourgeois-proletariat dialectic as a three-way conflict, the third pole being bourgeois nationalist movements that were inherently anti-imperialist and were demanding decolonization across the globe. The technique therefore was to ally the Soviet Union with the rising tide of nationalism – to demonstrate that they in Moscow were engaged in a common struggle against Western imperialism. Moscow also expected that the Soviet model of industrialization and nationalization would prove attractive, but that approach did not resonate with the nationalistic forces, which were based on the small middle class and were socializing the means of production. The passive reliance on the Soviet model of development failed because of the unreliability of local leaders, and by the Congo Crisis, the Kremlin had learned that it was essential to find and promote ideologically reliable leaders, who needed Soviet help to build enough military strength to control their country, as well as prevent Western coup attempts and insurrections.

== Algeria ==
As early as the 1930s, the Algerian Communist Party made up an important faction of the Algerian nationalist movement; however it supported France in the growing unrest, and was forced to dissolve in 1956. Its activists joined the militant National Liberation Front (FLN). Throughout the ferocious Algerian War of Independence in the 1950s, Moscow provided military, technical and material assistance to the FLN, and trained hundreds of its military leaders in the USSR. The Soviet Union was the first country in the world to recognize the Provisional Government of the Algerian Republic in 1962 by establishing diplomatic relations a few months before the official proclamation of its independence. Algeria became a leader of the Non-Aligned Movement, and largely targeted its rhetoric towards the United States, rather than France. However, Algeria was an oil exporting country, and the United States was a principal customer for oil, and a major supplier of machinery and engineering and technical engineering expertise.

By the 1960s both the Soviets and the Chinese were angling for Algerian attention. Moscow extended $100 million and credits to buy Soviet exports, while China provided $50 million in credits. Ahmed Ben Bella, in power 1963 to 1965, leaned toward China. He was overthrown by his defense minister Houari Boumédiène, who was in charge 1965-1976. Algeria strongly supported the Palestinian cause, and when Moscow was lukewarm in support of the Six-Day War in 1967, Algeria refused to let the Soviets build a naval base at Mers El Kébir. Paris sold Algeria French warplanes in 1968, looking to counterbalance the Soviet influence. Operating independently from the Kremlin, Fidel Castro turned Algeria into Cuba's first and closest ally in Africa between 1961 and 1965. Havana provided military and civilian assistance. Cuban Revolutionary Armed Forces soldiers, however did not engage in combat, and after the overthrow of Castro's friend Ben Bella, Cuba cut back its involvement.

Algeria supported the Polisario Front, a left-wing movement supported by Moscow that battled for 10 years for control of Western Sahara from Morocco. The United States, Egypt, Belgium, and France supported Morocco, and Algeria was increasingly identified with the Soviet side of the Cold War.

== Angola ==
In a complex civil war with outside interventions, Soviet military aid went to the Movimento Popular de Libertacao de Angola (MPLA). By 1976, the military sphere was the pivot of Angolan-Soviet relations. The Soviet Navy benefited from its use of Angolan ports to stage exercises. During 1956-1986, as part of the long South African Border War (1966-1990), the Soviets supplied and trained combat units from Namibia (SWAPO) and Angola (MPLA) at the African National Congress (ANC) military training camps in Tanzania. In 1986 Mikhail Gorbachev rejected the idea of a revolutionary takeover of the South African government, and advocated a negotiated settlement.

== Congo ==
Facing enormous turmoil in the newly independent Republic of the Congo (Léopoldville), Prime Minister Patrice Lumumba, the charismatic leader of the Mouvement National Congolais, reacted by calling for assistance from the Soviet Union. The Kremlin promptly sent military advisors and munitions. The involvement of the Soviets split the Congolese government and led to an impasse between Lumumba and conservative President Joseph Kasa-Vubu, who was anti-communist. President Kasa-Vubu used his command of the army to launch a coup d'état, expelling the Soviet advisors and establishing a new government under his own control. Lumumba was taken captive and subsequently executed in 1961. A rival government, the "Free Republic of the Congo", was founded in the eastern city of Stanleyville by Lumumba supporters, led by Antoine Gizenga. The Kremlin supported Gizenga, but did not want to take the international risks involved in delivering material aid to the blockaded Orientale Province. Instead the Kremlin provided Gizenga with financial aid, and urged its allies to run the blockade and assist Gizenga while avoiding a direct conflict with the West on the issue. The Gizenga regime was crushed in early 1962.

== Egypt ==
In the 1950s, Gamal Abdel Nasser began to follow an anti-imperialist policy that earned him enthusiastic support from the Communist government of the USSR. During the Nasser years, many young Egyptians studied in Soviet universities and military schools. Among them was the future president, Hosni Mubarak, who went for training in a military pilot school in Kant Air Base, Kyrgyzstan.

The relationship went sour within years after the death of Nasser, when the new president Anwar Sadat started re-orienting the country toward the West. On May 27, 1971, a friendship treaty was signed between the two countries, but relations were nevertheless declining. The Nixon administration was working behind the scenes with Sadat to bolster his plans to send the Russians home, which they did in July 1972. In March 1976 Egypt abrogated the friendship treaty. In September 1981, the last relations were severed by the Egyptian government accusing Soviet leadership of trying to undermine Sadat's leadership in retaliation to the Israeli-Egyptian peace treaty. Relations were reestablished under president Hosni Mubarak in 1984, and Alexander Belonogov became the Ambassador. In February 1989, Soviet Minister of Foreign Affairs Eduard Shevardnadze visited Egypt.

== Ethiopia ==
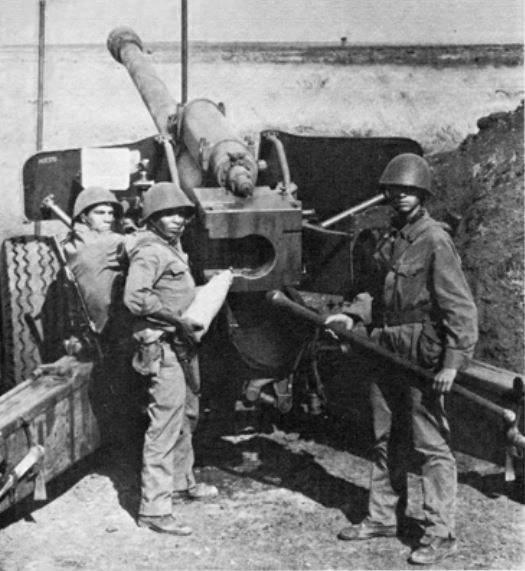
Cuban artillerymen manning a Soviet-supplied howitzer during the Ogaden War of 1977

Soviet foreign policy in Somalia and Ethiopia was based on the Horn of Africa's strategic location for international trade and shipping as well as its military importance. Neither country followed the Kremlin's directives unquestioningly.

The 1974 coup installed the Derg, a communist military junta under General Mengistu Haile Mariam. It proclaimed Marxism–Leninism as its official ideology and became a close ally of Moscow. The Soviets hailed Ethiopia for its supposed similar cultural and historical parallels to the USSR. Moscow said it proved that a backward society could become revolutionary by adopting a Leninist system. It was hailed as a model junior ally that Moscow was eager to support. In the 1980s, the People's Democratic Republic of Ethiopia plunged into greater turmoil and the Soviet system itself was collapsing by 1990. Russian commentators turned scornful of the Ethiopian regime.

Moscow’s public embrace of Mengistu troubled Siad Barre's pro-communist regime in Somalia. After rejecting a Soviet proposal for a four-nation Marxist–Leninist confederation, the Somali government launched an offensive in July 1977 with the intent of capturing Ethiopia's Ogaden region, starting the Ogaden War. Somalia appeared to be on the brink of victory after gaining control of 90% of the area. Mengistu urgently needed help. The USSR used its fleet of Antonov An-12 and Antonov An-22 air transports, as well as cargo vessels, to ship a billion dollars in fighter-bombers, tanks, artillery, and ammunition in a very short time. Suddenly, the Ethiopians launched a counter offensive with the help of newly arrived Soviet arms and a South Yemeni brigade. Infuriated by Soviet support for the Ethiopians, Somalia annulled its treaty with the Soviet Union and expelled all Soviet advisors in the country.

== Guinea ==
President John F. Kennedy eagerly sought to establish good relations with newly independent African nations in the wake of Khrushchev's 1961 speech that proclaimed the USSR's intention to intervene in anticolonial struggles around the world. Since most nations in Europe, Latin America, and Asia had already chosen sides, Kennedy and Khrushchev both looked to Africa as the next Cold War battleground. Under the leadership of Ahmed Sékou Touré, the former French colony of Guinea in West Africa proclaimed its independence in 1958 and immediately sought foreign aid. President Dwight D. Eisenhower was hostile to Touré, so the African nation quickly turned to the Soviet Union. However, President John F. Kennedy and his Peace Corps director Sargent Shriver tried even harder than Khrushchev. By 1963, Guinea had shifted away from Moscow into a closer friendship with Washington.

== Morocco & Western Sahara ==
In the 15-year Western Sahara War, the Soviet Union supported the Polisario Front and sent arms via Algeria. In this context, King Hassan II of Morocco said in 1980 that Morocco and the Soviet Union are "at war".

== Somalia ==
On 11 July 1974, the USSR and Somalia signed a Treaty of Friendship and Cooperation, with the USSR gaining a naval base at Berbera that year.

During the Ogaden War, due to Soviet support for Ethiopia, Siad Barre terminated the 1974 treaty and supported Somalia's realignment towards the West.

== South Africa ==
Apartheid-era propaganda leaflet issued to South African military personnel in the 1980s. The pamphlet decries "Russian colonialism and oppression".

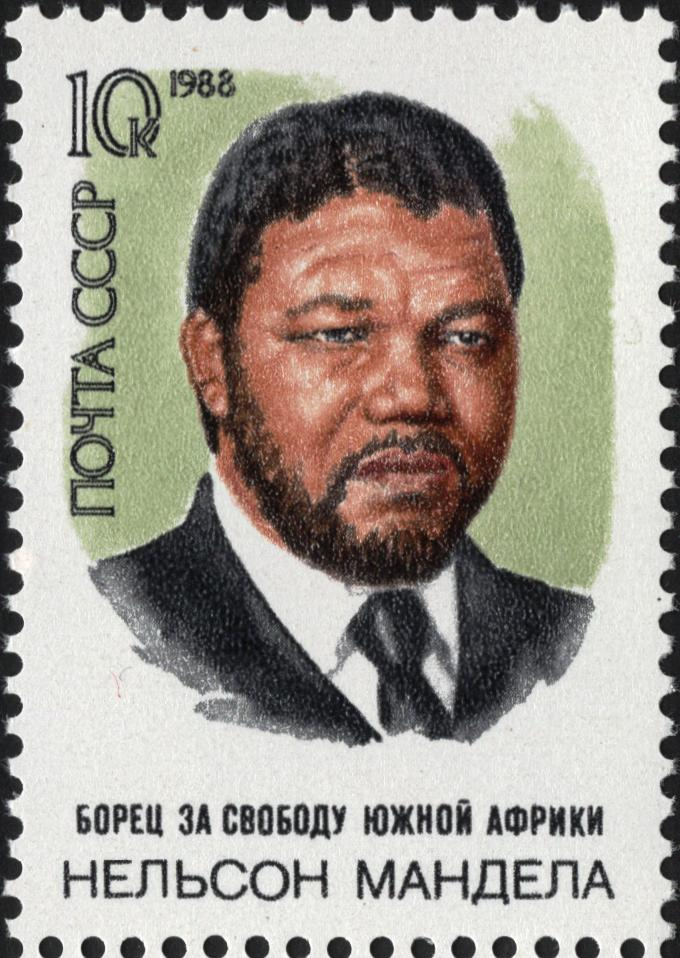
1988 Soviet commemorative stamp, captioned "Fighter for the freedom of South Africa Nelson Mandela" in Russian

The South African Communist Party (SACP), operating under the direction of the Comintern, was a strong supporter of the African National Congress. South African white politicians routinely denounced the ANC as a devious communist plot to overthrow the government. The Soviet Union withdrew its Ambassador after the Sharpeville massacre in 1960. After South Africa became a republic in 1961 and was expelled from the Commonwealth of Nations, relations were very cold. In 1961, the ANC and the SACP created a joint military wing, known as the "Spear of the Nation." South Africa considered the Soviet Union an enemy because it financially and militarily supported communism on the African continent. Pretoria severed diplomatic ties with Moscow in 1956, because of its support for the SACP. During 1956-1986, as part of the long South African Border War (1966-1990), the Soviets supplied and trained combat units from Namibia (SWAPO) and Angola (MPLA) at the ANC military training camps in Tanzania. In 1986 Gorbachev rejected the idea of a revolutionary takeover of the South African government, and advocated a negotiated settlement. Diplomatic ties were reestablished with Russia in February 1992, after the Soviet Union was dissolved.

The South African government evoked the term rooi gevaar to refer the political and military threat posed by the Soviet Union's support for the guerrilla wings of anti-apartheid movements such as SWAPO and the ANC.

Despite the widely reported Soviet support for the ANC and otherwise liberation movements, the Soviet Union also engaged in some trade with South Africa during the apartheid era, mostly involving arms and some mineral resources. From 1960 to 1964, De Beers had a unique arrangement to sell Soviet diamonds from Siberia. During the 1980s, a convoluted series of arms sales involving the Stasi, the Danish ship Pia Vesta, and Manuel Noriega of Panama ultimately aimed to transfer Soviet arms and military vehicles to South Africa. Around this time, the South African military's Armscor had a team of experts working in Leningrad involved in jet engine development.

== See also ==
- Angola–Soviet Union relations
  - Angolan War of Independence
- Botswana–Russia relations
- Burkina Faso–Soviet Union relations
- Ethiopia–Russia relations
- Ivory Coast–Soviet Union relations
- Morocco–Russia relations
- Russia–South Africa relations
  - South African Border War
- Russia–Zambia relations
- Soviet Afro-Asian Solidarity Committee
- Africa–China relations
  - Africa–China economic relations
- Africa-United States relations
