= Africa–Nordic relations =

Bilateral relations between Africa and the Nordic countries

Africa

Nordic countries

Africa–Nordic relations are the current and historical relationships between the African countries and the Nordic countries – Denmark, Finland, Iceland, Norway, and Sweden.

== Trade ==
In 2015, trade relations between Denmark and Africa totalled $1.9 billion; Norway-Africa trade amounted to $3 billion; while Finland’s Africa trade was $1.9 billion. Sweden had the largest trade with the continent, reaching $4.9 billion. For Sweden, South Africa is the most important export market in Africa.

Ever since the Aid for Trade Initiative was launched in 2006, Nordic development partners have supported the efforts of African countries to increase their exports, and they should continue to do so at both the national and the regional level, together with the AU and its partners.

The African market's share of the Nordic countries total trade (export + import) with the world over the ten-year period 2014-2024 was only 1.4 percent, less than half of the world average over the same time period (3.1 percent). However, in the new Africa strategies launched by the governments of Finland (in 2021), Denmark (in 2024) and Norway (in 2024), there is a strong emphasis on the potential of increasing trade with Africa. In fact, the Finnish government even sets up a concrete target of doubling trade between Finland and African countries between 2020 and 2030.

== Peace and security cooperation ==
Over the period 2012 to 2021, the Nordic countries have strengthened their relationship with African states and societies by supporting the African Peace and Security Architecture (APSA) and promoting African involvement in conflict prevention, mediation, peacekeeping, and peacebuilding efforts. All the Nordic countries work across the conflict spectrum and use a wide array of tools for partnering with African actors, including knowledge generation, training, capacity building, deployment of personnel and technical experts. Between 2012 and 2021, Nordic countries pledged USD 4.96 billion in development cooperation funding to Africa's peace and security.

Denmark has invested heavily in democracy and regional stabilisation, with Kenya and Mali as priority countries, and it established its own Peace and Stabilisation Fund to facilitate a flexible, whole-of-government approach at the intersection between security and development.

Finland has actively worked with the AU, EU, UN, and its African and Nordic partners to support mediation and reinforce inclusivity and sustainability. Finland's Africa Strategy emphasises equal partnership over aid dependency, and its AU Mediation Support project is considered a flagship effort.

Iceland strongly focuses on combating climate change and strengthening climate resilience in its bilateral cooperation. It also places top priority to gender equality and the women, peace and security (WPS) agenda, set by the UN Security Council Resolution 1325. It has developed a unique model, the Barbershop Toolbox, for mobilising men in the struggle for gender equality.

With over 30 years of peace diplomacy experience, Norway is enhancing the African-Nordic partnership’s capacity to prevent, manage, and resolve conflicts in Africa and has supported the Training for Peace (TfP) programme for over twenty years.

Sweden has shifted its international development cooperation to Africa’s fragile regions while focusing on APSA, capacity building, and the WPS agenda. This has boosted civilian peacebuilding, mediation, conflict prevention, human rights, and democracy.

== Nordic support to the African liberation movements ==
Nordic support to the African liberation movements started in 1969, when the Swedish parliament, based on resolutions by the UN General Assembly, declared it compatible with international law. Elsewhere in the Western world, this was far from a foregone conclusion. While the Danish government chose to assist the liberation movements via established NGOs, in 1973 Finland and Norway followed Sweden and extended direct support.

Most of the Nordic support was for liberation movements in Southern Africa, to countries like Angola, Mozambique, Namibia, South Africa, Zimbabwe, but parts of it also reached the liberation movements in Cape Verde and Guinea-Bissau. Between 1969 and 1994, the Nordic governments granted, in constant 1998 figures, a total of some 1.5 billion US Dollars as official humanitarian assistance to Southern Africa. Of this amount, 600 million, around 40%, went as direct support to the liberation movements. In several cases, the Nordic contributions represented over half of their non-military expenditure.

== See also ==
- Foreign relations of the African Union
- Foreign relations of Denmark
- Foreign relations of Finland
- Foreign relations of Iceland
- Foreign relations of Norway
- Foreign relations of Sweden
