= 3rd European Union–African Union Summit =

- Host country: Libya
- Date: 29–30 November 2010
- Cities: Tripoli
- Follows: 2nd European Union - African Union Summit
- Precedes: 4th European Union - African Union Summit

The 3rd European Union–African Union Summit took place in Tripoli, Libya on 29 and 30 November 2010.

== Background ==
The event was held under the theme of "Investment, Economic Growth and job creation". Eurobarometer ahead of the summit showed that majority of European citizens agreed with the proposed focus of ties on economic development and regional integration. Participants of the summit adopted the Second Action Plan for the period between 2011 and 2013 which emphasized higher education. German Federal Minister for Foreign Affairs Guido Westerwelle highlighted the importance of peaceful conduct of the upcoming 2011 South Sudanese independence referendum and expressed his country's willingness to support both the north and the south if the vote leads to an independent southern state. He also rejected Libyan leader Moammar Gadhafi's request for additional five billion euros in aid to stem the migration.

== See also ==
- Foreign relations of the European Union
