= 5th European Union–African Union Summit =

European Union - African Union Summit

5th European Union - African Union Summit

- Host country: Côte d'Ivoire
- Date: 29–30 November 2017
- Cities: Abidjan
- Precedes: 6th European Union - African Union Summit

5th European Union-African Union Summit took place in Abidjan on 29 and 30 November 2017. Cote d’Ivoire was selected as a host country of the summit at the 2016 African Union summit held in Kigali, Rwanda. Participants from Africa and Europe discussed common priorities in four strategic areas of economic opportunities for youth, peace and security, mobility and migration and cooperation on governance. More than 80 heads of state and government as well as about 5,000 other participants attended the summit. Side events of the summit included the 4th Africa-Europe youth summit, the 6th EU-Africa business forum and the Africa-EU civil society forum.

== See also ==
- 2007 Africa–EU Summit
- Foreign relations of the European Union
