= 7th European Union–African Union Summit =

2025 African Union–European Union summit meeting

7th African Union–European Union Summit European Union–African Union summit
- Host country: Angola
- Date: November 24, 2025 – November 25, 2025
- Motto: Promoting Peace and Prosperity through Effective Multilateralism
- Cities: Luanda
- Participants: Member states of the African Union (AU) and the European Union (EU)
- Chair: João Lourenço; António Costa
- Follows: 6th European Union–African Union Summit

The 7th African Union–European Union Summit was a meeting of heads of state and government from the member states of the African Union (AU) and the European Union (EU), held in Luanda, Angola, on 24–25 November 2025.

The summit marks the 25th anniversary of the formal AU–EU partnership and is convened under the theme "Promoting Peace and Prosperity through Effective Multilateralism". It is co-chaired by Angolan president João Lourenço and the president of the European Council, António Costa, with the EU also represented by the president of the European Commission, Ursula von der Leyen.

== Background ==
Regular summits between European and African leaders began in 2000 with the first Europe–Africa summit in Cairo. Since then, AU–EU summits have provided an overarching political framework for the partnership between the two unions. The 7th summit follows the sixth AU–EU summit, which took place in Brussels on 17–18 February 2022 and adopted a Joint Vision for 2030 intended to renew the relationship around shared priorities such as peace, security and sustainable development.

The Luanda summit takes place at a time of heightened geopolitical tension and economic uncertainty. Analysts have linked its agenda to the challenges created by global power competition, the economic effects of recent crises, and debates over multilateral governance and representation for African states.

== Preparations ==
In the lead-up to the summit, AU and EU officials organised a series of ministerial and technical meetings to review progress since 2022 and identify priority areas for Luanda. On 21 May 2025, ministers and senior representatives from around 80 governments met in Brussels to take stock of the implementation of the Joint Vision for 2030 and to align cooperation around four pillars: prosperity, peace and scurity, people, and planet and multilateralism.

The African Union Commission and the EU Delegation to the AU also launched a year-long #AUEU25 campaign to mark 25 years of AU–EU cooperation, featuring public events, exhibitions and outreach activities across both continents.

Angola, which hosts the meeting while holding the rotating chair of the African Union, framed the summit as part of national commemorations of the 50th anniversary of its independence and as an opportunity to highlight its role in regional peace and infrastructure initiatives.

== Agenda ==
According to the Council of the European Union and the European External Action Service, the summit agenda is structured around the official theme, Promoting Peace and Prosperity through Effective Multilateralism. Leaders are expected to discuss:

- peace and security, including conflict prevention, mediation, and support for African-led peace operations;
- economic transformation, trade and investment, with a focus on industrialisation, value-addition and resilient supply chains;
- connectivity and infrastructure, including projects supported through the EU’s Global Gateway investment strategy;
- climate change, energy transition and the implementation of Paris climate commitments;
- migration and mobility, including legal pathways, protection of refugees and combating irregular migration and trafficking;
- education, skills, innovation and digital transition;
- reforms of global governance and multilateral institutions to better reflect African representation and priorities.

Debt sustainability, infrastructure corridors such as the Lobito rail and road corridor, and coordination between European initiatives (including Global Gateway and national programmes such as Italy’s Mattei Plan for Africa) and African development agendas have also been highlighted in the wider policy debate surrounding the summit.

== Participants ==
The summit brings together the heads of state or government of the AU and EU member states, alongside the chairperson of the African Union Commission and senior EU representatives. Attendance also includes the EU High Representative / Vice-President, Kaja Kallas, and other institutional leaders.

Several national governments publicly announced their participation. South African president Cyril Ramaphosa and Sierra Leonean president Julius Maada Bio, among others, confirmed their attendance through official communications and media reports.

== Side events ==
A range of side events involving civil society, youth organisations, businesses and think tanks have been organised around the summit.

From 20 to 21 November 2025, a Civil Society and Youth Forum was held in Luanda as an official side event to the summit, bringing together youth leaders and civil society representatives from both continents to discuss participation, governance, human rights and cross-continental exchanges.

Business and innovation-focused events were convened by organisations including BusinessEurope and the Africa Europe Foundation, emphasising investment opportunities, green and digital transitions, and the role of the private sector in the AU–EU partnership.

== Reactions and analysis ==
Commentators and research organisations have framed the Luanda summit as a key test of whether AU–EU relations can move from summit-level declarations to concrete delivery on previous commitments. Some analyses point to the disruptions caused by Russia’s invasion of Ukraine and other global crises as reasons why the vision set out in 2022 has been difficult to implement, while also arguing that both unions now have incentives to reset and clarify their partnership.

As the meeting takes place, observers have highlighted issues such as debt relief, green energy partnerships, critical raw materials, security cooperation and migration governance as areas where tangible progress could shape perceptions of the AU–EU relationship in the coming years.

== See also ==
- African Union–European Union relations
- Foreign relations of the European Union
- Foreign relations of the African Union
