= Burkina Faso–Soviet Union relations =

Burkinabé–Soviet relations

- Burkina Faso: Soviet Union

Burkina Faso–Soviet Union relations refers to the historical relationship between the Union of Soviet Socialist Republics (USSR) and the Republic of Burkina Faso (formerly the Republic of Upper Volta). Relations between the countries were relatively close during some parts of the late Cold War. The Soviet Union maintained an embassy in the Burkinabé capital Ouagadougou, and Burkina Faso maintained an embassy in Moscow.

== History ==
Diplomatic relations between the two countries were established for the first time on 18 February 1967, during the first years of Colonel General Sangoulé Lamizana's military rule in Upper Volta. Bamina Georges Nebie, a later prominent government minister, served as the Voltaic ambassador to the USSR for some time. One of his successors was Oubkiri Marc Yao.

In 1983, Captain Thomas Sankara came to power in a military coup. While a radical left-wing revolutionary who had studied Karl Marx and Vladimir Lenin, Sankara – who attempted to implement what he dubbed the "Democratic and Popular Revolution" (French: Révolution démocratique et populaire) – did not align with the Soviet Union, preferring non-alignment and self-sufficiency. Nonetheless, relations with strongly pro-Soviet states (such as Cuba) were close, and Sankara maintained friendly relations with the USSR, despite many contentions – the Patriotic League for Development, closely aligned with the USSR, was initially allied with Sankara, but its members were removed from the government in 1984. In a newspaper editorial entitled "The Proletarian Spritit", Sankara – who often condemned foreign aid as imperialism – criticized the Soviet Union's foreign aid policies. Sankara also condemned the Soviet–Afghan War. In spite of these differences, the Soviet Union had some degree of cooperation with Burkina Faso – primarily militarily, in the form of provided training and equipment, and economically. Sankara made a state visit to Moscow while on a tour of other friendly states in October 1984.

By the time Thomas Sankara was ousted and killed on 15 October 1987 in a military coup orchestrated by Blaise Compaoré, the government of Mikhail Gorbachev was far too busy with demokratizatsiya, perestroika and glasnost to continue near any of its previously major engagements in Burkina Faso and Africa overall. When the Revolutions of 1989 began, the Burkinabé state debt to the USSR amounted to 4.3 million rubles. Burkina Faso recognized the Russian Federation as the USSR's successor state following its dissolution in 1991. The old respective Burkinabé–Soviet embassies closed down later during the 1990s due to funding issues.

== See also ==
- Foreign relations of Burkina Faso
- Foreign relations of the Soviet Union
- Burkina Faso–Russia relations
