= 6th European Union–African Union Summit =

2022 event

- Host country: Belgium
- Date: 17–18 February 2022
- Cities: Brussels
- Follows: 5th European Union - African Union Summit

The 6th European Union–African Union Summit took place in Brussels on 17 and 18 February 2022. Initially scheduled for October 2020, the event was postponed due to the COVID-19 pandemic. The summit was co-chaired by the President of the European Council, Charles Michel and the President of Senegal who at the time served as the Chairperson of the African Union, Macky Sall. The event brought together representatives of the EU and the AU as well as of their member states.

A research hired by the European Commission concluded that despite being Africa's top trading partner, European Union is not perceived as a major partner for African states with the United States and China ranked higher. The summit was organized to address some of those concerns as well as complex issues related to aspects of African immigration to Europe and the European Union response to the COVID-19 pandemic. The AERAP Africa-Europe Science Collaboration Platform organised a side event on the contribution of collaborative research and development to EU-Africa relations.

== Protests ==
Just outside the summit location in the European Council, nationals from the Comoros, the Democratic Republic of the Congo and Ethiopia all protested against injustices happening in their own countries, blocking the entrance to the council.

Comorians were heavily critical of French President Emmanuel Macron as being "responsible for all the misfortunes that hit the Comoros." Congolese protesters denounced presidents Paul Kagame and Yoweri Museveni of Rwanda and Uganda respectively, seeing them as playing a major role in destabilising the DRC. Ethiopians condemned the war crimes, massacres and sexual violence being committed in Tigray, and called for Eritrean forces to withdraw from the country.

== See also ==
- Foreign relations of the European Union
