= G33 (industrialized countries) =

Group of Thirty-Three
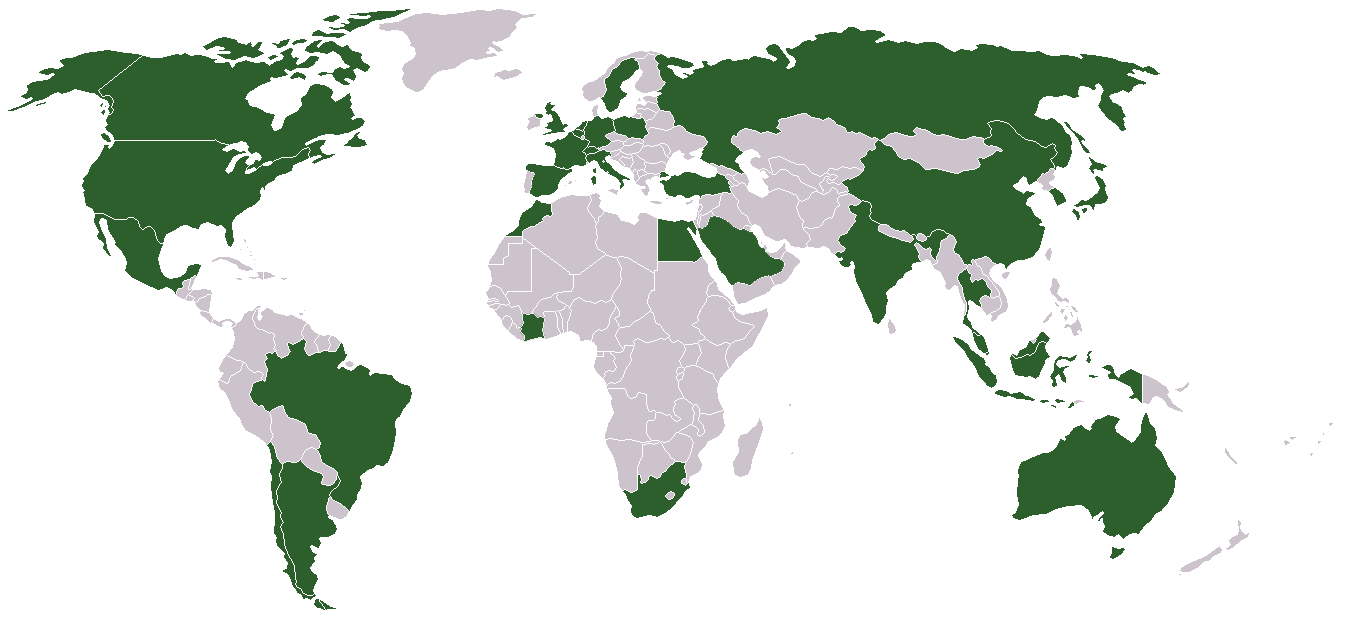
- Previous member states of the G33 (dark green)
- Abbreviation: G-33 or G33
- Formation: 1999
- Dissolved: 1999
- Members: 33 nations: Argentina Australia Belgium Brazil Canada Chile China (Ivory Coast) Côte d'Ivoire Egypt France Germany Hong Kong India Indonesia Italy Japan South Korea Malaysia Mexico Morocco Netherlands Poland Russia Saudi Arabia Singapore South Africa Spain Sweden Switzerland Thailand Turkey United Kingdom United States

The Group of 33 was an international grouping that existed briefly in 1999, comprising the thirty-three leading national economies of the world.

It superseded the Group of 22 in early 1999, and was itself superseded by the present Group of 20 later that year. A number of G33 meetings on the international financial system were held at the initiative of the finance ministers and central bank governors of the G7. The first meeting was held in Bonn, Germany in 1999.
