= 2nd European Union–African Union Summit =

Second summit between heads of state and government from EU and Africa

- Host country: Portugal
- Date: 8–9 December 2007
- Cities: Lisbon
- Follows: 1st European Union - African Union Summit
- Precedes: 3rd European Union–African Union Summit

The 2nd European Union - African Union Summit, which was held on 8 December – 9 December 2007 in Lisbon, Portugal, was the second summit between heads of state and government from EU and Africa (the first having been held in Cairo in 2000). It was hosted by Portugal, the holder of the EU's rotating presidency. During the summit, the "Joint EU-Africa Strategy", the "Action Plan" and the "Lisbon Declaration" were adopted.

There was controversy about the attendance of Robert Mugabe, the President of Zimbabwe, as he is subject to an EU travel ban. The European Commission president, José Manuel Barroso, defended inviting Mugabe to attend, saying that "If international leaders decided not to go to those conferences involving countries which do not have reasonable human rights records, I'm afraid we would not be attending many conferences at all." Because of Mugabe's attendance, Prime Minister Gordon Brown of the United Kingdom stayed away, and United Kingdom was represented by Baroness Amos. Prime Minister Mirek Topolánek of the Czech Republic also stayed away for the same reason.

== Issues and results of the summit ==
The summit agreed on eight strategic partnerships and an action plan and agreed to meet again in 2010.

The eight areas for strategic partnerships are:

1. Peace and security
2. Democratic governance and human rights
3. Trade, regional integration and infrastructure
4. Millennium Development Goals
5. Energy
6. Climate change
7. Migration, mobility and employment
8. Science, information society and space.

The existing preferential trade agreements between the EU and the ACP countries would not be compatible with WTO rules, except for a waiver which terminated at the end of 2007, and it had been hoped to replace these arrangements by WTO-compatible Economic Partnership Agreements (EPAs), but these were rejected by the African delegations.

Differences on human rights centered on Zimbabwe and its president, Robert Mugabe, as well as the Darfur conflict.

== Countries at the summit ==
=== European Union ===
- Austria
- Belgium
- Bulgaria
- Cyprus
- Czech Republic
- Denmark
- Estonia
- Finland
- France
- Germany
- Greece
- Hungary
- Ireland
- Italy
- Latvia
- Lithuania
- Luxembourg
- Malta
- Netherlands
- Poland
- Portugal
- Romania
- Slovakia
- Slovenia
- Spain
- Sweden
- United Kingdom

=== African Union ===
- Algeria
- Angola
- Benin
- Botswana
- Burkina Faso
- Burundi
- Cameroon
- Cape Verde
- Central African Republic
- Chad
- Comoros
- Dem. Rep. of the Congo
- Rep. of the Congo
- Côte d'Ivoire
- Djibouti
- Egypt
- Equatorial Guinea
- Eritrea
- Ethiopia
- Gabon
- Gambia
- Ghana
- Guinea
- Guinea-Bissau
- Kenya
- Lesotho
- Liberia
- Libya
- Madagascar
- Malawi
- Mali
- Mauritania
- Mauritius
- Mozambique
- Namibia
- Niger
- Nigeria
- Rwanda
- Sahrawi Arab Dem. Rep.
- São Tomé and Príncipe
- Senegal
- Seychelles
- Sierra Leone
- Somalia
- South Africa
- Sudan
- Swaziland
- Tanzania
- Togo
- Tunisia
- Uganda
- Zambia
- Zimbabwe

== Observers ==
=== Parliaments ===
- European Parliament
- Pan-African Parliament

=== EU candidate countries ===
- Turkey
- Croatia
- Republic of Macedonia

=== Other countries ===
- Norway
- Canada
- Japan
- Russia
- China
- India
- Brazil
- Switzerland
- Iceland
- Liechtenstein
- Morocco

=== International organizations ===
- UNHCR
- African Development Bank
- UNAIDS
- FAO
- Arab League

== See also ==
- Foreign relations of the African Union
- Foreign relations of the European Union
