= G33 (developing countries) =

Agricultural coalition of countries

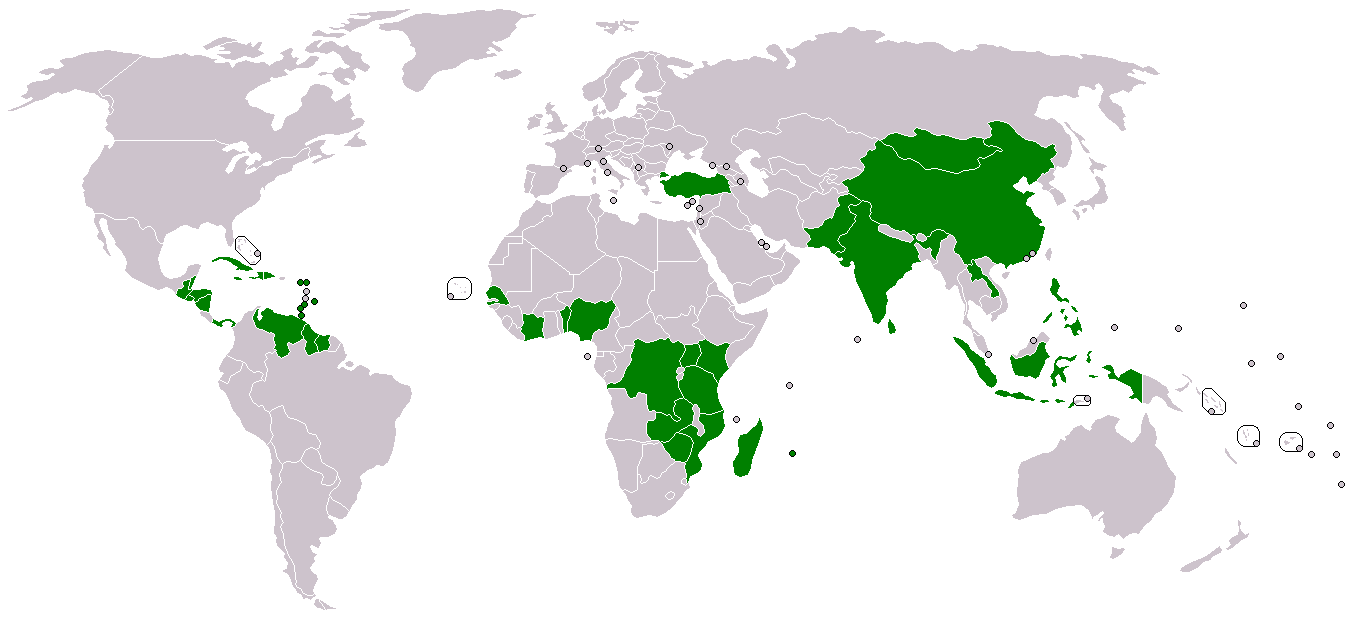
Current members of G33 showing in green

The G33 (or the Friends of Special Products in agriculture) is a coalition of developing countries, established prior to the 2003 Cancún ministerial conference, that have coordinated during the Doha Round of World Trade Organization negotiations, specifically in regard to agriculture.

Dominated by India, the group has "defensive" concerns regarding agriculture in relation to World Trade Organization negotiations, and seeks to limit the degree of market opening required of developing countries.

While rich governments can afford to heavily subsidize their agriculture, predatory dumping can undermine a poorer country's agricultural economy. Developing countries aim to balance power through tariffs, in order to manage their own food security, stabilize the livelihoods of their farming populations, and to strengthen rural development.

The group has advocated the creation of a "special products" exemption, which would allow developing countries to exempt certain products from tariff exemptions, and also a "special safeguard mechanism" which would permit tariff increases in response to import surges.

== Members ==
Despite the name, there are currently 48 member nations.

- Antigua and Barbuda
- Barbados
- Belize
- Benin
- China
- Cote d'Ivoire
- Cuba
- Democratic Republic of the Congo
- Dominican Republic
- El Salvador
- Grenada
- Guyana
- Guatemala
- Haiti
- Honduras
- India
- Indonesia
- Jamaica
- Kenya
- Laos
- Mauritius
- Madagascar
- Mongolia
- Mozambique
- Nicaragua
- Nigeria
- Pakistan
- Panama
- Philippines
- Saint Kitts and Nevis
- Saint Lucia
- Saint Vincent and the Grenadines
- Senegal
- Sri Lanka
- Suriname
- Tanzania
- Trinidad and Tobago
- Turkey
- Uganda
- Venezuela
- Zambia
- Zimbabwe
