= Bosnia and Herzegovina–NATO relations =

- NATO: Bosnia and Herzegovina

The accession of Bosnia and Herzegovina to NATO (North Atlantic Treaty Organization) has been under negotiations since 2008.

== Background ==
The 1995 NATO bombing of Bosnia and Herzegovina targeted the Bosnian Serb Army and together with international pressure led to the resolution of the Bosnian War and the signing of the Dayton Agreement in 1995. Since then, NATO has led the Implementation Force and Stabilization Force, and other peacekeeping efforts in the country.

Bosnia and Herzegovina joined the Partnership for Peace program of NATO in 2006, and signed an agreement on security cooperation in March 2007. The nation began further cooperation with NATO under their Individual Partnership Action Plan in January 2008. Bosnia then started the process of Intensified Dialogue at the 2008 Bucharest summit. The country was invited to join the Adriatic Charter of NATO aspirants on 25 September 2008. Then in November 2008, a joint announcement from the Defence Minister and the NATO Mission Office in Sarajevo suggested that Bosnia and Herzegovina could join NATO by 2011 if the defense reforms made until then were continued.

In January 2009, Defence Minister Selmo Cikotić again confirmed Bosnia's interest in seeking a Membership Action Plan (MAP) at the 2009 summit, with membership by 2012 at the latest. In February 2009 Defence Minister Selmo Cikotić presented poll numbers on NATO membership: 70% of the country supports NATO membership; however while 89% of the Federation Entity supports NATO membership, only 44% in the RS Entity did. While the country did not receive a MAP at the April 2009 summit in Strasbourg–Kehl, Stuart Jones, an official of the US State Department, said on a September 2009 visit to Bosnia and Herzegovina that NATO was going to look at the possibilities for them to receive one in a December 2009 summit, repeating strong US support for the possibility. Then on 2 October 2009, Haris Silajdžić, the Bosniak Member of the Presidency, announced an official application for a MAP. On 22 April 2010, NATO agreed to launch the MAP for Bosnia and Herzegovina, but with certain conditions. Turkey is thought to be the biggest supporter of Bosnian membership.

Bosnia and Herzegovina has yet to fulfil the condition to launch an Annual National Programme under its MAP: the transfer of the registration of 63 military facilities from the local level to the central government. As of November 2018, 33 have been fully transferred, all of which are located in the Federation of Bosnia and Herzegovina. The Republika Srpska (RS), the Serbian political subdivision of Bosnia, opposes the move and refuses to transfer the 23 properties located in its territory. A Bosnian court has ruled that it must transfer the military facility in Han Pijesak in RS to the Bosnian government. This was upheld by a ruling of the Constitutional Court of Bosnia and Herzegovina on 16 August 2017.

Despite the fact that all immovable property is not fully registered, NATO approved the activation of the Membership Action Plan for Bosnia and Herzegovina, and called on Bosnia to submit an Annual National Program on 5 December 2018. On 17 December, United States Deputy Secretary of State John Sullivan stated the United States supports Bosnia and Herzegovina's bid to join NATO, and dismissed Serb objections by adding that "Washington would react strongly to any threat to the stability of the country". The submission of a MAP Annual National Program was delayed due to a veto by Milorad Dodik, the Serb member of the Bosnian Presidency. The issue also prevented the formation of a government following the 2018 Bosnian general election. On 19 November 2019, as part of a broader deal on government formation, Dodik agreed to a Reform Program which would be sent to Brussels. However, there is disagreement on whether this Reform Program is actually an Annual National Program under NATO.

On 23 October 2025 Bosnia and NATO agreed on a new Individually Tailored Partnership Programme (ITPP) which replaced Bosnia and Herzegovina's previous Individual Partnership Action Plan (IPAP).

== Timeline of relations ==
Event	Date
Partnership for Peace	14 December 2006
Individual Partnership Action Plan	10 September 2008
Intensified Dialogue	3 April 2008
Membership Action Plan	5 December 2018 (Note: Originally invited to join the MAP in April 2010 under the condition that no Annual National Programme would be launched until one of the conditions for the OHR closure – the transfer of control of immovable defence property to the central Bosnian authorities from the two regional political entities – was fulfilled. Condition waived in 2018.)
Individually Tailored Partnership Programme	23 October 2025

== Bosnia and Herzegovina's foreign relations with NATO member states ==
- Albania
- Belgium
- Bulgaria
- Canada
- Croatia
- Czech Republic
- Denmark
- Estonia
- Finland
- France
- Germany
- Greece
- Hungary
- Iceland
- Italy
- Latvia
- Lithuania
- Luxembourg
- Montenegro
- Netherlands
- North Macedonia
- Norway
- Poland
- Portugal
- Romania
- Slovakia
- Slovenia
- Spain
- Sweden
- Turkey
- United Kingdom
- United States

== See also ==
- Foreign relations of Bosnia and Herzegovina
- Foreign relations of NATO
- Enlargement of NATO
- NATO open door policy
- Partnership for Peace
- Accession of Bosnia and Herzegovina to the EU
- Bosnia and Herzegovina–Russia relations
