= Ukraine bioweapons conspiracy theory =

Conspiracy theory originating in Russia

In March 2022, during the Russian invasion of Ukraine, Russian officials falsely claimed that public health facilities in Ukraine were "secret U.S.-funded biolabs" purportedly developing biological weapons, which was debunked by multiple media outlets, scientific groups, and international bodies. The claim was amplified by China's Ministry of Foreign Affairs and Chinese state media, and was also promoted by followers of the QAnon conspiracy theory and subsequently supported by other far-right groups in the United States.

Russian scientists, inside and outside Russia, have publicly accused the Russian government of lying about evidence for covert "bioweapons labs" in Ukraine, saying that documents presented by Russia's Defense Ministry describe pathogens collected for public health research. The "bioweapons labs" claim has also been denied by the US, Ukraine, the United Nations, and the Bulletin of the Atomic Scientists.

Both the U.S. and Ukraine have signed a treaty, the Biological Weapons Convention, effectively banning biological and toxin weapons by prohibiting their development, production, acquisition, transfer, stockpiling and use.

== Background on the laboratories ==
In 2005, the Ukrainian Ministry of Health and the U.S. Department of Defense (DoD) signed an agreement to prevent the spread of technologies and pathogens that might be used in the development of biological weapons. New laboratories were established to secure and dismantle the remnants of the Soviet biological weapons program, and since then have been used to monitor and prevent new epidemics. The laboratories are publicly listed, not secret, and are owned and operated by host countries such as Ukraine, not by the US. The Ukrainian-owned threat reduction labs, which are listed by the U.S. Embassy, also send academics to international scientific conferences who publicize their work. The agreement indicated the U.S. would provide assistance at no cost to Ukraine. A 2013 Congressional Research Service report notes that the U.S. has completed upgrades at secured labs in Ukraine and that the DoD continues to support upgrades and training at these facilities. As of 2019, the U.S. Embassy in Ukraine issued a statement that U.S. Department of Defense’s Biological Threat Reduction Program (BTRP) supports many collaborative research projects with Ukraine and that the program had upgraded many laboratories and built two others in Ukraine.

In 2020, the Security Service of Ukraine noted that as part of the 2005 agreement, "a number of state laboratories located in Odesa, Kharkiv, Lviv, Kyiv, Vinnytsia, Kherson, and Dnipropetrovsk regions were modernized", and that "We emphasize that these laboratories are financed from the state budget". On February 27, 2022, USA Today, in a fact check, said that according to the Security Service of Ukraine, "The labs are owned and funded by the Ukrainian government." On March 11, 2022, the U.S. Department of Defense issued a fact check that stated "The United States, through BTRP, has invested approximately $200 million in Ukraine since 2005, supporting 46 Ukrainian laboratories, health facilities, and diagnostic sites." On March 13, 2022, Forbes asserted there was "no evidence of the U.S. supporting biological labs in Ukraine."

== Kremlin accusations and spread of conspiracy theory ==
=== Russian and Chinese officials and state media ===
Both Russian and Chinese officials have made accusations in attempt to boost the conspiracy theory. Russian proponents have included Foreign Minister Sergey Lavrov, United Russia leader Dmitry Medvedev, the official Twitter account of the Russian embassy in Sarajevo, and the Russian state-owned media outlets Sputnik and TASS. China's Foreign Affairs Ministry has asked for a "full account" of Ukraine's "biological military activities at home and abroad."

On March 11, 2022, Russia called a meeting in the UN to discuss the allegations, which Reuters described as an attempt to re-assert the unproven allegations without evidence. This led the UN to say there was no evidence of a Ukraine biological weapons program, while the United States and its allies accused Russia of spreading the claim as a prelude to Russia potentially launching biological or chemical attacks.

In March 2022 a group of researchers from Moscow State University published an open letter in which they criticized the state media narratives and pointed out scientific inaccuracies in their postulates, such as "genetic weapons targeting exclusively Russians", which they described as "outright lie" and biological impossibility. They also discussed the "list of dangerous bacteria strains" published by Russia as "evidence for bioweapons program" and clarified that none of these strains were actually dangerous or used in biological weapons, and some of the strains, routinely used in biological research, were actually purchased by Ukraine from Russian companies.

In July 2022, two Russian State Duma members announced that a biolabs commission investigation found that Ukraine had administered drugs to its soldiers that "completely neutralize the last traces of human consciousness and turn them into the most cruel and deadly monsters", and that this was evidence that "this system for the control and creation of a cruel murder machine was implemented under the management of the United States".

==== United States and Russian Federation official inquiries ====
In June 2022 the Russian Federation, after presenting its own narrative across state media, filed official questions to the United States under article V of the Biological and Toxin Weapons Convention (BWC). The US's responses, published in August 2022, accuses Russia of a number of "mischaracterizations". The US also asserts that the document sent by Russia did not contain actual questions, but rather a series of "assertions" whose overall purpose is "to imply an unspecified sinister motive". The US also replied to specific accusations by Russia as follows:

- Laboratories in Ukraine were established on a legal basis, per the BWC, which encourages cooperative research between signatory states in the area of new potential threats, such as zoonotic diseases. The US pointed out that it has been running cooperative research together with Russia itself since 1992 for 21 years in exactly the same way as with Ukraine and other countries. This US-Russian cooperative research program was terminated by Russia in 2005.
- Russia alluded to Ukraine improperly "send[ing] all strains and data from disease surveillance" to the United States. The US asserted this was a mischaracterization, since transfer of samples is a typical part of any scientific cooperation in any area. The exchange of samples was voluntary and applied to samples explicitly requested by the US side for research purposes, rather than a blanket order to transfer of all results as suggested by Russia.
- The United States also asserts that the documents published by Russia were "virtually unreadable". US requests to provide readable copies was ignored, and later used by Russia to claim that the "US did not provide responses" to their legitimate documents.
- Russia accused Ukraine and the US of forming the cooperative agreement in "secret", while Russia itself has relied on information openly published by Ukraine and US research websites. The joint research program has also resulted in dozens of scientific articles that remain openly available in scientific journals, and further summarized in official BWC reports.
- Russia claimed the list of specific pathogens studied at Mechnikov Anti-Plague Scientific Institute in Odesa, Ukraine "disagrees with the current Ukraine’s health issues". The US has replied that this claim reveals ignorance regarding the scope of Ukraine's current health issues (e.g. cases of anthrax and cholera are endemic to Ukraine and another huge outbreak of the latter "could occur as a result of the war waged by the Russian Federation").

=== Online conspiracy theories and reactions ===
According to cybersecurity and threat intelligence company Pyrra Technologies, the first mention of biolabs in Ukraine was a February 14 post on alt-tech far-right social network Gab, ten days before the start of the invasion. The post featured a graphic titled “Exclusive US biolabs in Ukraine … financed at the expense of the US Department of Defense.” On February 27, 2022, USA Today reported and linked to a Facebook post that shared the same graphic.

Zignal Labs assessed that English language influencers had initially elaborated the talking point, which was spread by Russian propaganda thereafter, with Russian-language posts on "biolabs" increasing after March 6 to outpace English-language posts on the subject.

A study by the Center for Countering Digital Hate found that Facebook failed to label 80% of posts sharing external articles that spread the conspiracy theory as false or misleading. The posts used in the study were dated from 24 February to 14 March. A Facebook spokesperson said that the study "misrepresents the scale and scope of our efforts".

The Center for Monitoring, Analysis and Strategy (CeMAS) found that a German Telegram channel with over 200,000 subscribers was promoting false claims about the US having a secret biological laboratory in Ukraine. CeMAS cofounder Jan Rathje said: "All of these new [online] actors that became influential during the pandemic switched to a pro-Russia position. They always focus on a large conspiracy going on from the elite against the people. People are suffering in Ukraine. And they wouldn't deny that. But they would say, 'Yeah, but that's part of the larger, inhumane conspiracy that's going on.'"

That month, as reported by Mother Jones, the Kremlin sent a memo to state-friendly media outlets saying it was "essential" to use video clips of Carlson "as much as possible". Mother Jones further observed Carlson was the only Western media pundit the Kremlin adopted in this way.

A Brookings Institution dataset tracked how a group of right-wing political podcasts were promoting the "Ukraine bioweapons labs" myth between March 8 and 18, with the most prolific being Steve Bannon and Charlie Kirk, who supported the narrative in five episodes each. According to Brookings, the podcasting medium served to propagate disinformation potentially faster than 'social' media, because there is no "built-in mechanism" for listeners to push back on claims or fact-check.

According to journalist Justin Ling, the Ukraine bioweapons myth spread "from a fringe QAnon channel directly to Fox News and Donald Trump Jr." Fox News commentator Tucker Carlson claimed that the U.S. was "funding the creation of deadly pathogens" and broadcast statements by Russian and Chinese government spokesmen accusing Washington of operating a bioweapons program in Europe. Tucker Carlson continued the story on several episodes, including an episode with Glenn Greenwald on March 10, 2022.

In days following, CNN, France 24, and Foreign Policy reported that QAnon promoters were echoing Russian disinformation that created conspiracy theories about US-funded laboratories in Ukraine. Russian state media falsely claimed that "secret US biolabs" were creating weapons, a claim refuted by the US, Ukraine, and the United Nations. In the conspiracy theory interpretation, QAnon followers have claimed to justify the invasion of Ukraine as an effort by Putin and Trump to destroy "military" laboratories in Ukraine. InfoWars has also supported the conspiracy theory, running a headline: "Russian Strikes Targeting US-Run Bio-Labs in Ukraine?".

== Tulsi Gabbard remarks and actions ==
=== 2022 comments ===
On March 13, 2022, Tulsi Gabbard posted a video on Twitter saying that the U.S. government was funding dozens of biological laboratories in Ukraine and that these labs were "conducting research on dangerous pathogens". She added that the U.S. government was trying to "cover this up" and called for a ceasefire in the vicinity of any U.S.-funded biological laboratories "until they're secured and these pathogens are destroyed."

Although Gabbard did not say the laboratories were producing biological weapons in her video, some politicians and journalists have accused Gabbard of endorsing or echoing Russian disinformation. At the Washington Post, Philip Bump argued that her comments about a coverup were "an amplification of the idea that the U.S. is acting suspiciously". Senator Mitt Romney tweeted that Gabbard was "parroting false Russian propaganda" and that her "treasonous lies may well cost lives." A Romney representative did not respond to a request for clarification of the specific basis for the accusation. Her remarks were also widely portrayed by Russian propagandists as showing evidence of U.S.-funded bioweapon labs.

On March 15, Gabbard rejected the characterization on Fox News, saying that “Senator Romney and all these different talking heads in the mainstream media” were “accusing me of saying that somehow there are bio weapons labs in Ukraine,” and adding, “I said no such thing at any point.” She said her comments had been misinterpreted and distinguished between biolabs conducting research on dangerous pathogens and biological-weapons laboratories. She responded to Romney on Twitter, saying that "evidence of the existence of such biolabs, their vulnerability, and thus the need to take immediate action to secure them is beyond dispute".

In November 2024, after Donald Trump nominated Gabbard as Director of National Intelligence, ABC News wrote that although she later said her comments concerned public-health research labs, "she also expressed concerns that Ukraine was in possession of biological weapons during an interview with former Fox News host Carlson a few days before taking to social media." In the March 9 interview, Carlson asked Gabbard: "how concerned are you that Toria Nuland, who is overseeing this war has just admitted there are unsecure bio agents -- dangerous bio agents in Ukraine?" Gabbard replied, "I'm extremely concerned as should be every American and everyone in the world. The seriousness of this situation really can't be overstated. First of all, she didn't say no when she was asked by Marco Rubio about there being biological or chemical weapons in Ukraine." She added that "if there were or are, obviously that would be a violation of the Biological Weapons Convention." In that testimony, Rubio asked whether Ukraine "has chemical or biological weapons". Nuland responded: "Ukraine has biological research facilities which we are now quite concerned that Russian forces may be seeking to gain control of," and "We are working with the Ukrainians on how they can prevent any of those research materials from falling into the hands of Russian forces should they approach."

=== 2026 release ===
On June 12, 2026, shortly before the end of her tenure as Director of National Intelligence, Gabbard released a four-page PowerPoint report on biological laboratories in Ukraine. The report showed U.S. government support for veterinary, medical, and diagnostic laboratories in Ukraine intended to help prevent disease outbreaks. One of the slides also included a possibly AI-generated map with several errors, including Kyiv being in the wrong location. Another slide warned about Russian disinformation operations.

In a press release issued the same day, Gabbard said, "The information surrounding the existence, history, locations, and funding of these US funded biolabs has been intentionally covered up by powerful people falsely, claiming that they do not exist". Journalists reported that the information in the report had already been public. The list of veterinary research projects in the report was taken from a publicly available 2019 report.

Ukraine's Ministry of Foreign Affairs responded to the release with a statement saying that the exclusive purpose of the laboratories were "strengthening the capabilities of the public health system, epidemiological surveillance, laboratory diagnostics, biosafety, and biosecurity", referring to this as "ordinary civilian activities". Russia's foreign ministry characterized the release as evidence of the laboratories having military purposes. A bot network associated with the Kremlin also engaged in a disinformation campaign to falsely represent the release and media sources as confirming the conspiracy.

== Connection to previous conspiracy theories ==
Political scientist and espionage scholar Thomas Rid suggests this may be a case of the Kremlin "accusing the other side of the thing they are in fact doing" based on historical precedent (accusation in a mirror). In the 1980s, when the Soviets deployed chemical weapons in Laos and Afghanistan, Soviet-aligned press published disinformation alleging that the CIA was weaponizing mosquitoes. False Soviet reports blaming HIV/AIDS on the United States, commonly called Operation INFEKTION, also aimed to distract from contemporary Soviet activities. Additionally, Thomas Rid stated that the right-wing adoption of the Ukraine bioweapons conspiracy theory may be influenced by the COVID-19 lab leak theory. According to Brookings, previous COVID-19 conspiracy theories were frequently rehashed, with Anthony Fauci mentioned over 50 times, among various unsubstantiated accusations.

The Kremlin has a history of fomenting conspiracy theories about ordinary biology labs in former Soviet republics, having previously spread propaganda about Georgia and Kazakhstan similar to recent accusations deployed against Ukraine. For example, the Kremlin made false accusations against the public health facility, Lugar Research Center in Georgia, as the research center worked on fighting against the COVID-19 pandemic. The labs have been widely observed by international partnerships since the Nunn–Lugar Cooperative Threat Reduction, which was established to contain and eliminate weapons of mass destruction (nuclear, chemical, and biological) left behind in the former Soviet Union. When this threat reduction was complete, the research facilities, owned by the newly independent countries, began the task of public health research, including monitoring and preventing new epidemics. The Department of Defense provides "technical support to the Ukrainian Ministry of Health since 2005 to improve public health laboratories" as part of a continuation of international agreements to reduce biological threats, but does not control or provide personnel to the public health facilities.

Robert Mackey, a writer for The Intercept, noted similarities the conspiracy theory shared with the false and fabricated claims the United States made about Iraq's WMD programme in the lead-up to the Iraq War. He stated that, while Russian officials regularly cited this as a reason to dismiss criticism against their conduct in Ukraine, they nevertheless echoed the dishonesty of the Bush Administration whenever they presented false claims about Ukrainian bioweapons as fact, saying:

All this suggests that the real lesson Russian officials took from the false American claims of WMD [sic] in Iraq is not that such claims need to be backed by solid evidence, but that they can make similarly false claims now, secure in the knowledge that very few people will bother to look at the evidence at all.

== See also ==
- Allegations of Iraqi mobile weapons laboratories
- Biden–Ukraine conspiracy theory
- Conspiracy theories related to the Trump–Ukraine scandal
- Disinformation in the Russian invasion of Ukraine
- Russian information war against Ukraine
- Soviet biological weapons program
