= Bosnia and Herzegovina–Romania relations =

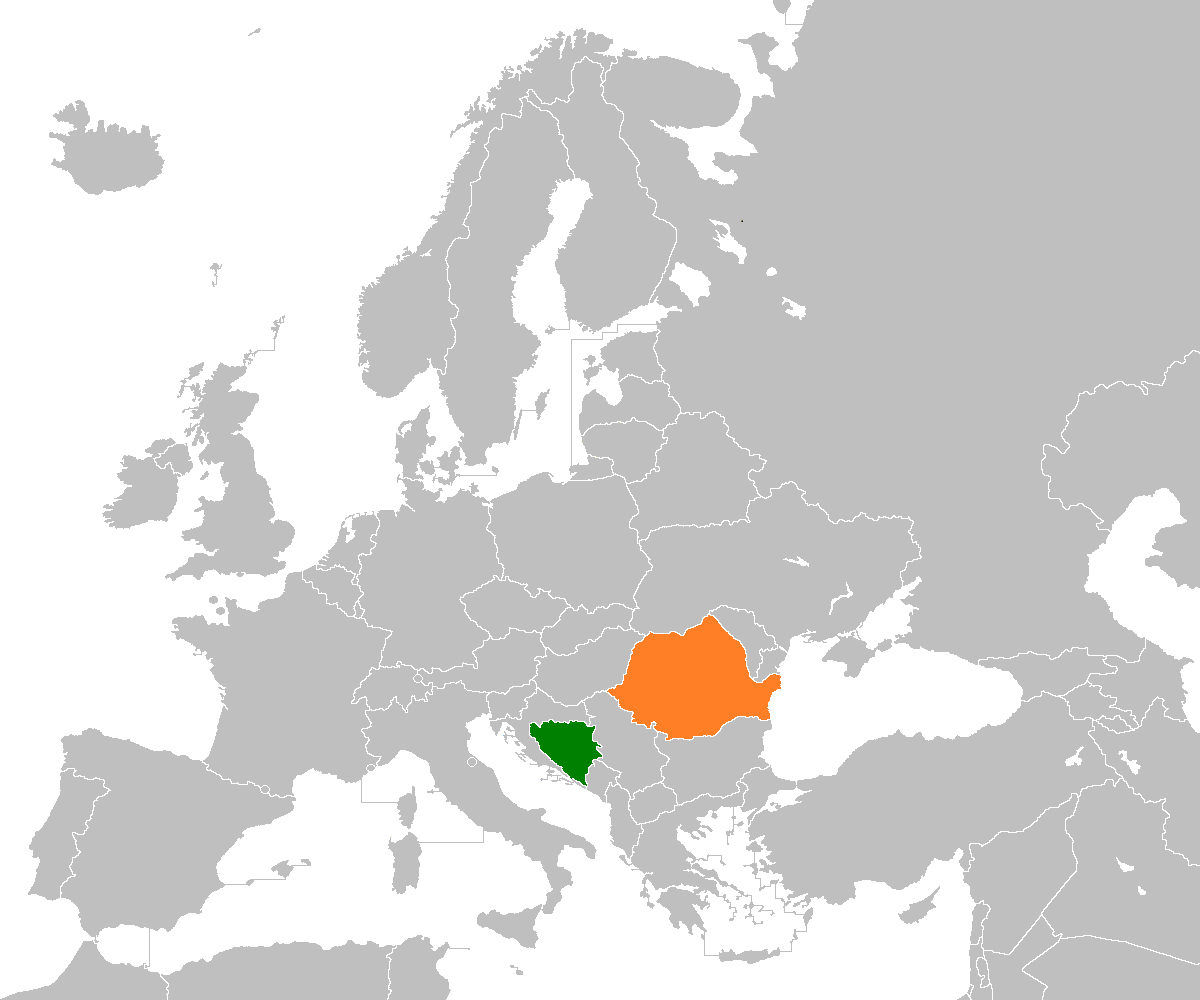

- Bosnia and Herzegovina: Romania

Bosnia and Herzegovina–Romania relations are bilateral relations between Romania and Bosnia and Herzegovina. Both countries are full members of the Southeast European Cooperation Process, Southeast European Cooperative Initiative, Organization for Security and Co-operation in Europe, and Stability Pact for South Eastern Europe. Bosnia and Herzegovina has an embassy in Bucharest. Romania has an embassy in Sarajevo.

== History ==
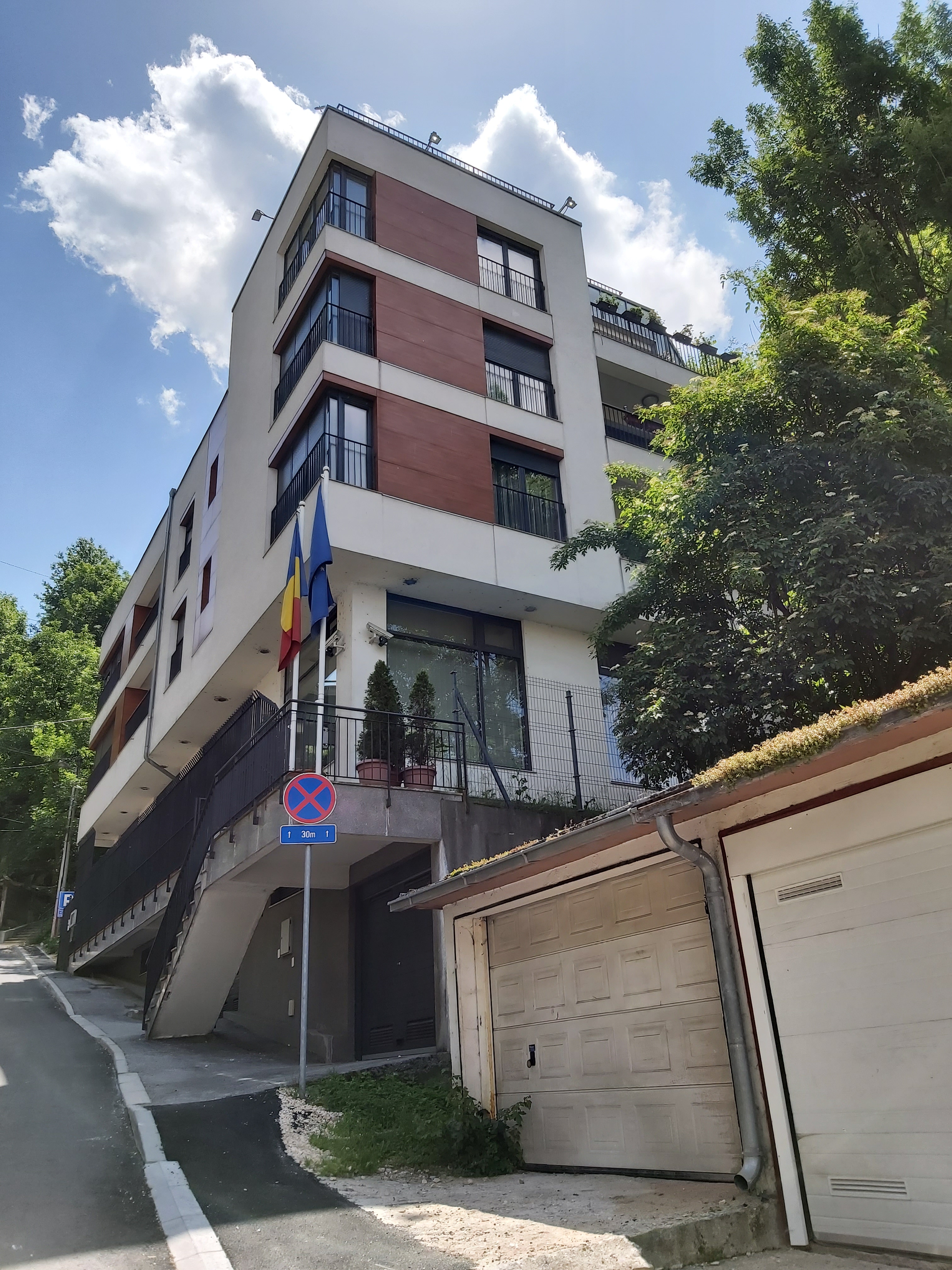
Embassy of Romania in Sarajevo

Romania recognized Bosnia and Herzegovina's independence on 1 March 1996, both countries established diplomatic relations on the same day. Relations were described as "excellent" by the foreign ministers in 2006, ahead of the opening of the Bosnian embassy in Bucharest.

They entered into a free trade agreement in April 2003, which Romania withdrew from following its entry into the European Union in 2007. President Traian Băsescu of Romania made an official visit to Bosnia and Herzegovina in March 2008. Romania has argued against any rapid withdrawal of troops from Bosnia, and supports Bosnian entry into the EU.

== Military cooperation ==
Romania contributed 200 soldiers to a non-combat Engineering Battalion of IFOR/SFOR in the wake of the Bosnian conflict in the mid-90s, four helicopters to the EUFOR operation between 2005 and 2006, and 85 police to the EU mission between 2003 and 2006. The countries signed a military cooperation plan in 2006.

== National minorities ==
In Republika Srpska, one of the two entities constituting Bosnia and Herzegovina together with the Federation of Bosnia and Herzegovina, Romanians are legally recognized as an ethnic minority. In the village of Ostružnja Gornja exists the Ostružnja Association of Romanians, a cultural association for the small Romanian community of the village, composed of 53 families with around 350 members in total.

== Resident diplomatic missions ==
- Bosnia and Herzegovina has an embassy in Bucharest.
- Romania has an embassy in Sarajevo.

== See also ==
- Foreign relations of Bosnia and Herzegovina
- Foreign relations of Romania
- Bosnia and Herzegovina-NATO relations
- Accession of Bosnia and Herzegovina to the EU
- Romania–Yugoslavia relations
