= Bosnia and Herzegovina–Montenegro relations =

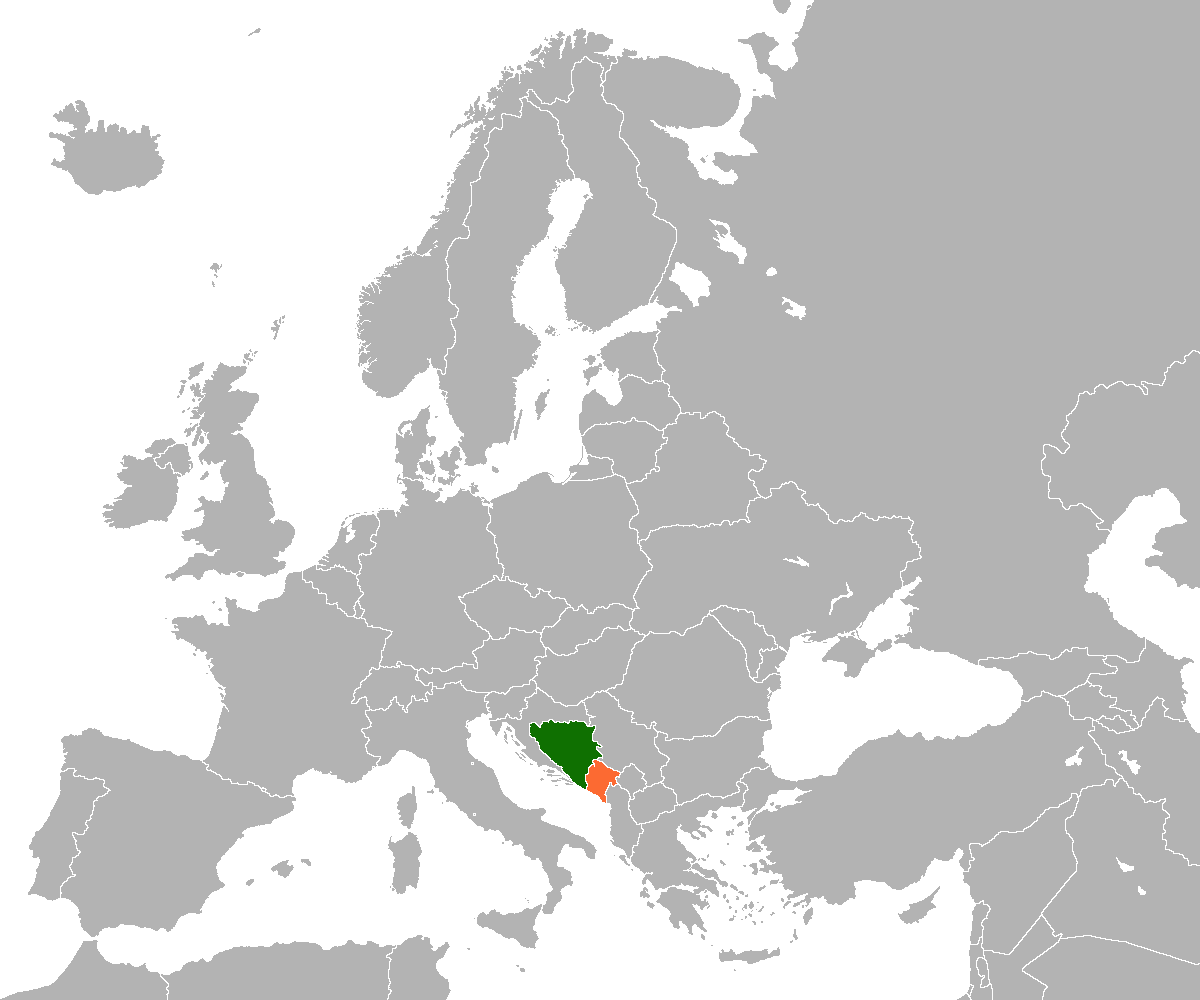

- Bosnia and Herzegovina: Montenegro

Bosnia and Herzegovina–Montenegro relations are foreign relations between Bosnia and Herzegovina and Montenegro, two neighboring Western Balkans countries. Following the 2006 Montenegrin independence referendum Bosnia and Herzegovina recognized Montenegrin independence on 21 June 2006 and the two countries established formal diplomatic relations on 14 September 2006. Embassy of Bosnia and Herzegovina in Montenegro was opened on 10 December 2007. Both countries are aspiring members of the European Union with Montenegro being a candidate country since 17 December 2010 while Bosnia and Herzegovina has been a candidate country since 15 December 2022. The two countries support each other in this ambition.

Before early 1990s, both countries were constituent republics of the Socialist Federal Republic of Yugoslavia as the SR Bosnia and Herzegovina and SR Montenegro respectively. Following the breakup of SFR Yugoslavia Bosnia and Herzegovina declared independence after the 1992 independence referendum which led to Bosnian War in which Republic of Montenegro (at the time constituent federated state of the newly established FR Yugoslavia) supported Republika Srpska.

== Resident diplomatic missions ==
- Bosnia and Herzegovina has an embassy in Podgorica.
- Montenegro has an embassy in Sarajevo.

== See also ==
- Foreign relations of Bosnia and Herzegovina
- Foreign relations of Montenegro
- Bosniaks of Montenegro
- Montenegrins of Bosnia and Herzegovina
- Accession of Bosnia and Herzegovina to the European Union
- Accession of Montenegro to the European Union
- Agreement on Succession Issues of the Former Socialist Federal Republic of Yugoslavia
