= Montenegrins of Bosnia and Herzegovina =

Montenegrins in Bosnia and Herzegovina are an officially recognised national minority. The 1991 census counted 10,071 ethnic Montenegrins, while the 2013 census, counted some 7,150.

== Demographics ==
- 1948 Census: 3,094 (0.1% of total population)
- 1953 Census: 7,336 (0.3% of total population)
- 1961 Census: 12,828 (0.4% of total population)
- 1971 Census: 13,021 (0.3% of total population)
- 1981 Census: 14,114 (0.3% of total population)
- 1991 Census: 10,071
- 2013 census: 7,150

== See also ==
- Bosnia and Herzegovina–Montenegro relations
- Ethnic groups in Bosnia and Herzegovina
- Montenegrin diaspora
- Bosniaks of Montenegro
