= Bosnia and Herzegovina–Malaysia relations =

- Bosnia and Herzegovina: Malaysia

Envoy

Bosnia and Herzegovina–Malaysia relations refers to the foreign relations between Bosnia and Herzegovina and Malaysia. Bosnia and Herzegovina has an embassy in Kuala Lumpur, and Malaysia has an embassy in Sarajevo.

During the first premiership of Mahathir Mohamad (1981-2003), Malaysia was a strident advocate for the plight of the Muslim Bosniaks in the Bosnian War, helping to send peacekeepers and temporarily resettling Bosnian families in Malaysia. Although the majority have since returned to Bosnia after the war, or migrated elsewhere, a small Bosnian community still remains in Malaysia.

== History ==
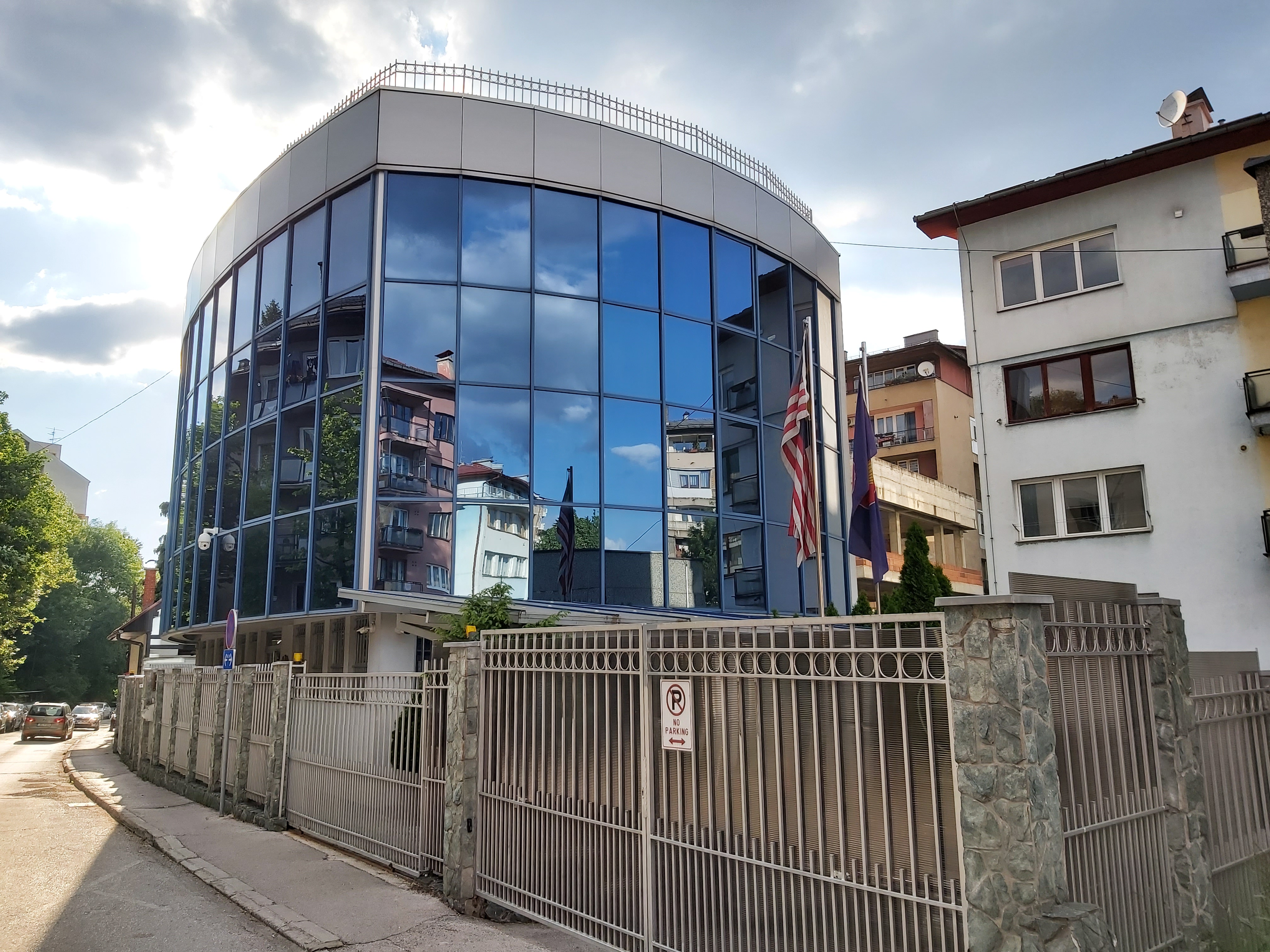
Embassy of Malaysia in Sarajevo

In October 1993 during the Bosnian War, Mahathir Mohamad, who was the Malaysian Prime Minister at the time, expressed concern with the violation of human rights in Bosnia and Herzegovina. Thus, he sent a group of Malaysian soldiers to participate in the UN Peacekeeping Operations and called the Organisation of Islamic Cooperation (OIC) in 1995 to set up measures and help the newly independent European country. Since then, both countries have established relations and Malaysia has recognised Bosnia and Herzegovina as an independent country.

== Economic relations ==
The bilateral trade between the two countries is expanding, with Malaysia's main exports to Bosnia and Herzegovina composed almost entirely of electronics and electrical products, while imports from Bosnia and Herzegovina consisted mainly of furniture and aluminium. Both countries also cooperate in the agriculture and halal sectors. Besides that, three Malaysian Islamic banks have set up operations in Bosnia in 2010.

== Resident diplomatic missions ==
- Bosnia and Herzegovina has an embassy in Kuala Lumpur.
- Malaysia has an embassy in Sarajevo.

== See also ==
- Foreign relations of Bosnia and Herzegovina
- Foreign relations of Malaysia
- Yugoslavia and the Non-Aligned Movement
