= Foreign relations of Bosnia and Herzegovina =

The implementation of the Dayton Accords of 1995 has focused the efforts of policymakers in Bosnia and Herzegovina, as well as the international community, on regional stabilization in the successor countries of the former Yugoslavia. Relations with its neighbors of Croatia and Serbia have been fairly stable since the signing of the Dayton Agreement in 1995.

== Diplomatic relations ==
List of countries which Bosnia and Herzegovina maintains diplomatic relations with:

#	Country	Date
1	Austria	8 April 1992
2	Hungary	10 April 1992
3	United Kingdom	13 April 1992
4	Saudi Arabia	17 April 1992
5	Bahrain	3 May 1992
6	Liechtenstein	5 May 1992
7	Denmark	2 June 1992
8	Estonia	25 June 1992
9	Croatia	21 July 1992
10	India	10 August 1992
–	Holy See	20 August 1992
11	Turkey	29 August 1992
12	Libya	28 October 1992
–	State of Palestine	30 October 1992
13	Tunisia	30 October 1992
14	Lithuania	6 November 1992
15	France	12 November 1992
16	Germany	13 November 1992
17	Slovenia	16 November 1992
18	New Zealand	17 November 1992
19	Argentina	19 November 1992
20	Malaysia	5 December 1992
21	Comoros	10 December 1992
22	Sweden	11 December 1992
23	Spain	14 December 1992
24	Netherlands	15 December 1992
25	Albania	28 December 1992
26	Kuwait	4 January 1993
27	Australia	7 January 1993
28	Algeria	20 January 1993
29	Qatar	22 January 1993
30	Iran	25 January 1993
31	Italy	1 February 1993
32	Switzerland	3 February 1993
33	Slovakia	8 February 1993
34	Morocco	24 February 1993
35	Mongolia	24 February 1993
36	Czech Republic	8 April 1993
37	Egypt	17 April 1993
38	Kyrgyzstan	23 April 1993
39	North Macedonia	12 May 1993
40	United States	18 June 1993
41	United Arab Emirates	1 August 1993
42	Sudan	5 August 1993
43	Senegal	20 August 1993
44	Mauritania	1 November 1993
45	Moldova	10 November 1993
46	Norway	12 November 1993
47	Belarus	22 November 1993
48	Brunei	25 January 1994
49	Belgium	3 March 1994
50	Jordan	7 March 1994
51	Indonesia	11 April 1994
52	Luxembourg	12 April 1994
53	Pakistan	16 November 1994
54	Chad	25 November 1994
55	Syria	1 December 1994
56	Mali	10 December 1994
57	Finland	2 January 1995
58	Azerbaijan	9 February 1995
59	Democratic Republic of the Congo	20 March 1995
60	Zambia	20 March 1995
61	South Africa	23 March 1995
62	China	3 April 1995
63	Burkina Faso	26 May 1995
64	Lebanon	22 June 1995
65	Bangladesh	26 August 1995
66	Ireland	27 September 1995
67	Uruguay	28 September 1995
68	Malta	14 October 1995
69	Cape Verde	18 October 1995
70	Guinea-Bissau	18 October 1995
71	Ivory Coast	18 October 1995
72	Niger	18 October 1995
73	Colombia	19 October 1995
74	Costa Rica	19 October 1995
75	Namibia	19 October 1995
76	Singapore	1 November 1995
77	Portugal	13 November 1995
78	Greece	30 November 1995
79	Brazil	6 December 1995
80	Canada	14 December 1995
81	South Korea	15 December 1995
82	Yemen	19 December 1995
83	Ukraine	20 December 1995
84	Oman	3 January 1996
85	Poland	11 January 1996
86	Bulgaria	12 January 1996
87	North Korea	19 January 1996
88	Belize	24 January 1996
89	Vietnam	26 January 1996
90	Japan	9 February 1996
91	Romania	1 March 1996
92	Laos	7 March 1996
93	Andorra	28 March 1996
94	Guinea	9 April 1996
95	Latvia	19 April 1996
96	Iceland	8 May 1996
97	Uzbekistan	16 May 1996
98	Turkmenistan	17 June 1996
99	Gambia	12 July 1996
100	Eritrea	17 September 1996
101	Mozambique	27 September 1996
102	Jamaica	9 October 1996
103	Chile	31 October 1996
104	San Marino	19 November 1996
105	Tajikistan	9 December 1996
106	Kazakhstan	20 December 1996
107	Russia	26 December 1996
108	Maldives	27 January 1997
—	Sovereign Military Order of Malta	31 January 1997
109	Bolivia	27 February 1997
110	Cuba	29 April 1997
111	Armenia	29 July 1997
112	Israel	25 September 1997
113	Venezuela	13 January 1998
114	Peru	23 January 1998
115	Ecuador	26 January 1998
116	Georgia	17 March 1998
117	Angola	24 September 1999
118	Nepal	12 January 2000
119	Cyprus	7 February 2000
120	Thailand	14 February 2000
121	Nigeria	13 September 2000
122	Serbia	15 December 2000
123	Philippines	12 January 2001
124	São Tomé and Príncipe	8 May 2001
125	Sri Lanka	22 June 2001
126	Mexico	15 August 2001
127	El Salvador	22 May 2003
128	Cambodia	23 December 2003
129	Panama	14 July 2004
130	Timor-Leste	22 March 2005
131	Afghanistan	20 September 2005
132	Iraq	7 March 2006
133	Monaco	27 July 2006
134	Montenegro	14 September 2006
135	Ethiopia	12 February 2007
136	Mauritius	30 May 2007
137	Botswana	15 September 2008
138	Kenya	26 September 2008
139	Guatemala	9 January 2009
140	Samoa	13 March 2009
141	Djibouti	17 March 2009
142	Saint Vincent and the Grenadines	19 March 2009
143	Dominican Republic	23 June 2009
144	Burundi	9 September 2009
145	Cameroon	10 September 2009
146	Benin	11 September 2009
147	Paraguay	22 September 2009
148	Nicaragua	22 October 2009
149	Eswatini	25 November 2009
150	Liberia	23 February 2010
151	Equatorial Guinea	24 February 2010
152	Fiji	20 April 2010
153	Haiti	17 May 2010
154	Suriname	21 June 2010
155	Honduras	14 September 2010
156	Uganda	3 December 2010
157	Republic of the Congo	23 February 2011
158	Trinidad and Tobago	19 April 2011
159	Antigua and Barbuda	1 June 2011
160	Tuvalu	1 June 2011
161	Myanmar	25 August 2011
162	Gabon	21 September 2011
163	Malawi	18 October 2011
164	Solomon Islands	26 January 2012
165	Zimbabwe	11 July 2012
166	Ghana	13 February 2013
167	Saint Lucia	15 April 2013
168	Guyana	9 May 2013
169	Rwanda	17 October 2013
170	Dominica	6 March 2014
171	Seychelles	4 June 2014
172	Sierra Leone	24 November 2015
173	Vanuatu	26 September 2018
174	Tanzania	25 January 2019
175	Barbados	6 August 2019
176	Marshall Islands	23 September 2019
177	Togo	24 October 2019
178	Bahamas	30 October 2019
179	Saint Kitts and Nevis	6 December 2019
180	Grenada	6 October 2020
181	South Sudan	27 October 2021
182	Somalia	4 February 2022
183	Tonga	9 February 2023
184	Federated States of Micronesia	19 April 2023

== Bilateral relations ==
=== Americas ===
Country	Formal Relations Began	Notes
Brazil	6 December 1995	Bosnia and Herzegovina is accredited to Brazil from its embassy in Washington, D.C., United States.; Brazil has an embassy in Sarajevo.
Canada	14 December 1995	See Bosnia and Herzegovina–Canada relations Bosnia and Herzegovina is represented through the Embassy of Bosnia and Herzegovina in Ottawa, while Canada is represented by the embassy of Canada in Budapest. Three Canadian organizations operate programs in Bosnia and Herzegovina: Foreign Affairs and International Trade Canada (DFAIT), the Canadian International Development Agency (CIDA) and the Department of National Defence (DND). Canada strongly supports the signing of the Dayton Agreement hoping it can help bring more stability to the region. Through the Canadian International Development Agency Canada has given more than CA$ 144 million in development assistance. Exports of Bosnia and Herzegovina to Canada are worth about US$ 5.31 million per year, while exports of Canada to Bosnia and Herzegovina value about US$5.34 million per year.: Embassy of Canada to Bosnia and Herzegovina
Mexico	15 August 2001	Bosnia and Herzegovina is accredited to Mexico from its embassy in Washington, D.C., United States.; Mexico is accredited to Bosnia and Herzegovina from its embassy in Belgrade, Serbia.
United States	18 June 1993	See Bosnia and Herzegovina–United States relations The 1992–1995 war in Bosnia and Herzegovina was ended with the crucial participation of the United States in brokering the 1995 Dayton Accords. After leading the diplomatic and military effort to secure the Dayton agreement, the United States has continued to lead the effort to ensure its implementation. The United States maintains command of the NATO headquarters in Sarajevo. The United States has donated hundreds of millions of dollars to help with infrastructure, humanitarian aid, economic development, and military reconstruction in Herzegovina and Bosnia. The U.S. Agency for International Development (USAID) and Support for Eastern European Democracies (SEED) has played a large role in post-war Bosnia and Herzegovina, including programs in economic development and reform, democratic reform (media & elections), infrastructure development, and training programs for Bosnian professionals, among others. Additionally, there are many non-governmental organizations (NGOs) that have likewise played significant roles in the reconstruction.: Bosnia and Herzegovina has an embassy in Washington, D.C. and consulate-general in Chicago.; the United States has an embassy in Sarajevo.

=== Asia ===
Country	Formal Relations Began	Notes
Armenia	29 July 1997	See Armenia–Bosnia and Herzegovina relations: Armenia is accredited to Bosnia and Herzegovina from its embassy in Prague, Czech Republic.; Bosnia and Herzegovina is accredited to Armenia from its embassy in Moscow, Russia.
Georgia	17 March 1998	Bosnia and Herzegovina and Georgia established diplomatic relations in 1998. They share relations at the non-resident ambassadorial level. The first high-level visit was that paid by the BiH Foreign Minister Igor Crnadak to Tbilisi in August 2016. In January 2018, Georgia issued a protest note to BiH over the breakaway South Ossetian leader Anatoly Bibilov's visit to the Republika Srpska. In a response, the BiH Foreign Ministry stated that Georgia and Bosnia had good relations and Bosnia would not interfere into the question of South Ossetia. Crnadak also said Bibilov's visit damaged an international standing of the Republika Srpska.
India	10 August 1992	See Bosnia and Herzegovina–India relations
Indonesia	11 April 1994	See Bosnia and Herzegovina–Indonesia relations
Iran	25 January 1993	See Bosnia and Herzegovina–Iran relations
Malaysia	5 December 1992	See Bosnia and Herzegovina–Malaysia relations Malaysia, under Prime Minister Mahathir Mohamad (1981–2003), had been one of the strongest supporters of the Bosnian cause during the war and the only Asian country that accepted Bosnian refugees. Malaysia sent UN Peacekeeping troops to the former Yugoslavia. Malaysia maintains a number of investments in Bosnia-Herzegovina, one of the most significant is the Bosmal Group. Bosmal is a joint venture set up between Malaysian and Bosnian interests. A number of Bosnian students are currently studying at the International Islamic University Malaysia in Gombak. Malaysia maintains an embassy in Sarajevo and Bosnia-Herzegovina maintains an embassy in Kuala Lumpur.
Pakistan	16 November 1994	See Bosnia and Herzegovina–Pakistan relations Pakistan and Bosnia and Herzegovina enjoy close and cordial relations. Pakistan recognised the independence of Bosnia from Yugoslavia in 1992. Pakistan sent in UN Peacekeeping forces to the former Yugoslavia during the Yugoslav wars. During the war, Pakistan supported Bosnia while providing technical and military support to Bosnia. Pakistan and Bosnia have a free trade agreement. During the War time, Pakistan had hosted thousands of Bosnians as refugees in Pakistan. Pakistan has also provided medium-tech to high Tech weapons to Bosnian Government in the past.
Saudi Arabia	17 April 1992	See Bosnia and Herzegovina–Saudi Arabia relations Saudi Arabia has provided enormous financial assistance to Bosnia and Herzegovina since its independence in 1992. Saudi interests also funded for the construction of the King Fahd Mosque, which is currently the largest mosque in Sarajevo. Bosnia and Herzegovina maintains an embassy in Riyadh and Saudi Arabia maintains an embassy in Sarajevo.
South Korea		See Bosnia and Herzegovina–South Korea relations Both countries established diplomatic relations on 15 December 1995.
Turkey	29 August 1992	See Bosnia and Herzegovina–Turkey relations Turkey provided both political and financial support to Bosnia and Herzegovina during the war. After the war, relations have improved even more, and today Turkey is one of BiH's top foreign investors and business partners.

=== Europe ===
Country	Formal Relations Began	Notes
Austria	8 April 1992	See Austria–Bosnia and Herzegovina relations: Bosnia and Herzegovina has an embassy in Vienna.; Austria has an embassy in Sarajevo.
Bulgaria	12 January 1996	Both countries established diplomatic relations on 15 January 1992. Since 1996, Bulgaria has an embassy in Sarajevo. Bosnia and Herzegovina has an embassy in Sofia. Both countries are full members of the Southeast European Cooperation Process, of the Southeast European Cooperative Initiative, of the Stability Pact for South Eastern Europe, of the Organization for Security and Co-operation in Europe and of the Council of Europe. Bulgaria was the first country to recognize Bosnia as an independent country.
Croatia	21 July 1992	See Bosnia and Herzegovina–Croatia relations Discussions continue with Croatia on several small disputed sections of the boundary related to maritime access that hinder final ratification of the 1999 border agreement. Sections of the Una river and villages at the base of Mount Plješevica are in Croatia, while some are in Bosnia, which causes an excessive number of border crossings on a single route and impedes any serious development in the region. The Zagreb-Bihać-Split railway line is still closed for major traffic due to this issue. The road Karlovac-Plitvice Lakes-Knin, which is on the European route E71, is becoming increasingly unused because Croatia built a separate highway to the west of it. The border on the Una river between Hrvatska Kostajnica on the northern, Croatian side of the river, and Bosanska Kostajnica on the southern, Bosnian side, is also being discussed. A river island between the two towns is under Croatian control, but is claimed by Bosnia. A shared border crossing point has been built and has been functioning since 2003, and is used without hindrance by either party. The Herzegovinian municipality of Neum on the Adriatic coast makes the southernmost part of Croatia an exclave and the two countries are negotiating special transit rules through Neum to compensate for that. Recently Croatia has opted to build a bridge to the Pelješac peninsula to connect the Croatian mainland with the exclave but Bosnia and Herzegovina has protested that the bridge will close its access to international waters (although Croatian territory and territorial waters surround Bosnian-Herzegovinian territory and waters completely) and has suggested that the bridge must be higher than 55 meters for free passage of all types of ships. Negotiations are still being held.: Bosnia and Herzegovina has an embassy in Zagreb and consulate-general in Rijeka.; Croatia has an embassy in Sarajevo and consulates-general in Banja Luka, Livno, Mostar, and Tuzla.; Bosnia and Herzegovina is an EU candidate and Croatia is an EU member.
Cyprus	7 February 2000	Cyprus recognized Bosnia and Herzegovina's independence on 7 February 2000, both countries established diplomatic relations on the same date. Bosnia and Herzegovina is represented in Cyprus through its embassy in Tel Aviv, Israel. Cyprus is represented in Bosnia and Herzegovina through its embassy in Budapest, Hungary. Both countries are full members of the Union for the Mediterranean, of the Organization for Security and Co-operation in Europe and of the Council of Europe.
Czech Republic	8 April 1993	The Czech Republic recognized Bosnia and Herzegovina's independence on 8 February 1992. Both countries established diplomatic relations on 8 April 1993. Bosnia and Herzegovina has an embassy in Prague. The Czech Republic has an embassy in Sarajevo. Both countries are full members of the Organization for Security and Co-operation in Europe and of the Council of Europe.
Denmark	2 June 1992	See Bosnia and Herzegovina – Denmark relations
Finland	2 January 1995	See Bosnia and Herzegovina–Finland relations
France	12 November 1992	See Bosnia and Herzegovina–France relations In 2019, Bosnia's presidency summoned the French ambassador Guillaume Rousson to protest over President Emmanuel Macron’s comment in an interview with British weekly The Economist that the country is a “time bomb” due to returning Islamist fighters.: Bosnia and Herzegovina has an embassy in Paris.; France has an embassy in Sarajevo.
Germany	13 November 1992	See Bosnia and Herzegovina–Germany relations Germany is one of the most important partners of Bosnia and Herzegovina in foreign affairs. Bilateral relations have developed steadily since diplomatic ties were established in mid-1994. Germany was closely involved in efforts to bring about peace before and after the conclusion of the Dayton Agreement. There is also a long tradition of economic relations between Germany and Bosnia. When the country was still part of the former Yugoslavia, joint ventures and cooperation played a large role here (motor industry, metal processing, textile industry/contract processing work, steel and chemicals). After the war, Germany took on a spearheading role in investments in production in Bosnia and Herzegovina, which is undergoing a transitional phase from a centrally planned to a market economy. These investments are concentrated primarily in vehicle assembly and parts supply, the construction industry/cement, raw materials processing/ aluminum and regional dairy farming.
Greece	30 November 1995	Greece recognized Bosnia and Herzegovina's independence in 1992. Both countries established diplomatic relations on 30 November 1995. Since 1998, Bosnia and Herzegovina has an embassy in Athens. Since 1996, Greece has an embassy in Sarajevo. Both countries are full members of the Union for the Mediterranean, of the Southeast European Cooperation Process, of the Southeast European Cooperative Initiative, of the Organization for Security and Co-operation in Europe and of the Council of Europe. In 2006, Greece provided 80.4% of the funding for the reconstruction of the Greece–Bosnia and Herzegovina Friendship Building.
Holy See	20 August 1992	See Holy See–Bosnia and Herzegovina relations Holy See recognized Bosnia and Herzegovina's independence on 7 April 1992. Both countries established diplomatic relations on 20 August 1992.
Hungary	10 April 1992	Hungary recognized Bosnia and Herzegovina's independence on 9 April 1992. Both countries established diplomatic relations on 10 April 1992. Bosnia and Herzegovina has an embassy in Budapest. Hungary has an embassy in Sarajevo. Both countries are full members of the Organization for Security and Co-operation in Europe and of the Council of Europe.
North Macedonia	12 May 1993	See Bosnia and Herzegovina–North Macedonia relations The two countries first shared the same 90s objective of pursuing independence from Yugoslavia, and in the 21st century, the common objective of joining the EU.
Romania	1 March 1996	See Bosnia and Herzegovina–Romania relations Romania recognized Bosnia and Herzegovina's independence on 1 March 1996, both countries established diplomatic relations on the same day. Bosnia and Herzegovina has an embassy in Bucharest. Romania has an embassy in Sarajevo. Relations were described as "excellent" by the foreign ministers in 2006, ahead of the opening of the Bosnian embassy in Bucharest.
Russia	26 December 1996	See Bosnia and Herzegovina–Russia relations Bosnia is one of the countries where Russia has contributed troops for the NATO-led stabilization force. Others were sent to Kosovo and Serbia.: Bosnia and Herzegovina has an embassy in Moscow.; Russia has an embassy in Sarajevo.
Slovenia		Bosnia and Herzegovina has an embassy in Ljubljana.; Slovenia has an embassy in Sarajevo.
Spain		See Bosnia and Herzegovina–Spain relations: Bosnia and Herzegovina has an embassy in Madrid.; Spain has an embassy in Sarajevo.
Sweden		See Bosnia and Herzegovina–Sweden relations
Serbia		See Bosnia and Herzegovina–Serbia relations Bosnia and Herzegovina filed a suit against the Federal Republic of Yugoslavia (present-day Serbia and Montenegro) before the International Court of Justice for aggression and genocide during the Bosnian War which was dismissed. Serbia was found responsible for failure to prevent genocide in Srebrenica. Sections along the Drina River remain in dispute between Bosnia and Herzegovina and Serbia.
Ukraine	20 December 1995	See Bosnia and Herzegovina–Ukraine relations
United Kingdom	13 April 1992	See Bosnia and Herzegovina–United Kingdom relations Bosnia and Herzegovina established diplomatic relations with the United Kingdom on 13 April 1992.: Bosnia and Herzegovina maintains an embassy in London.; The United Kingdom is accredited to Bosnia and Herzegovina through its embassy in Sarajevo.; Both countries share common membership of the Council of Europe, the International Criminal Court, and the OSCE. Bilaterally the two countries have a Double Taxation Convention, an Investment Agreement, and a Reciprocal Healthcare Agreement.

=== Oceania ===
Country	Formal Relations Began	Notes
Australia	7 January 1993	Bosnia and Herzegovina has an embassy in Canberra.; Australia has an Honorary Consulate in Sarajevo, however services such as passports and visas are managed by the Australian Embassy in Vienna.; Bosnian migration to Australia has occurred in three main waves in the 20th century, with the biggest group coming during the Bosnian War in the 1990s. Many Bosnians arriving as refugees settled in Melbourne where they have established strong community groups and many mosques. Business links between the two countries are in their infancy with many in the Bosnian diaspora starting to build connections through groups like the "Australian Bosnian and Herzogovinian Chamber of Commerce". In 2023, Australia exported US$1.34 Million worth of goods to Bosnia and Herzegovina, primarily consisting of machinery and electrical equipment.

== EU accession ==
The accession of Bosnia and Herzegovina to the European Union is one of the main political objectives of Bosnia and Herzegovina. The Stabilisation and Association Process (SAP) is the EU's policy framework. Countries participating in the SAP have been offered the possibility to become, once they fulfill the necessary conditions, member states of the EU. Bosnia and Herzegovina is therefore a potential candidate country for EU accession.

== International organizations ==
Bank for International Settlements, Council of Europe, Central European Initiative, EBRD, Energy Community United Nations Economic Commission for Europe, FAO, Group of 77, IAEA, IBRD, ICAO, International Criminal Court, International Development Association, IFAD, International Finance Corporation, IFRCS, ILO, International Monetary Fund, International Maritime Organization, Interpol, IOC, International Organization for Migration (observer), ISO, ITU, Non-Aligned Movement (guest), Organization of American States (observer), OIC (observer), OPCW, Organization for Security and Co-operation in Europe, Southeast European Cooperative Initiative, United Nations, UNCTAD, UNESCO, UNIDO, UNMEE, UPU, WHO, WIPO, WMO, WToO, WTrO (observer)

== See also ==
- Bosnia and Herzegovina and the International Monetary Fund
- List of diplomatic missions of Bosnia and Herzegovina
- List of diplomatic missions in Bosnia and Herzegovina
- Visa requirements for Bosnia and Herzegovina citizens
- Accession of Bosnia and Herzegovina to the European Union
- Bosnia and Herzegovina–NATO relations
- Foreign relations of Yugoslavia
