= Bosnia and Herzegovina–Denmark relations =

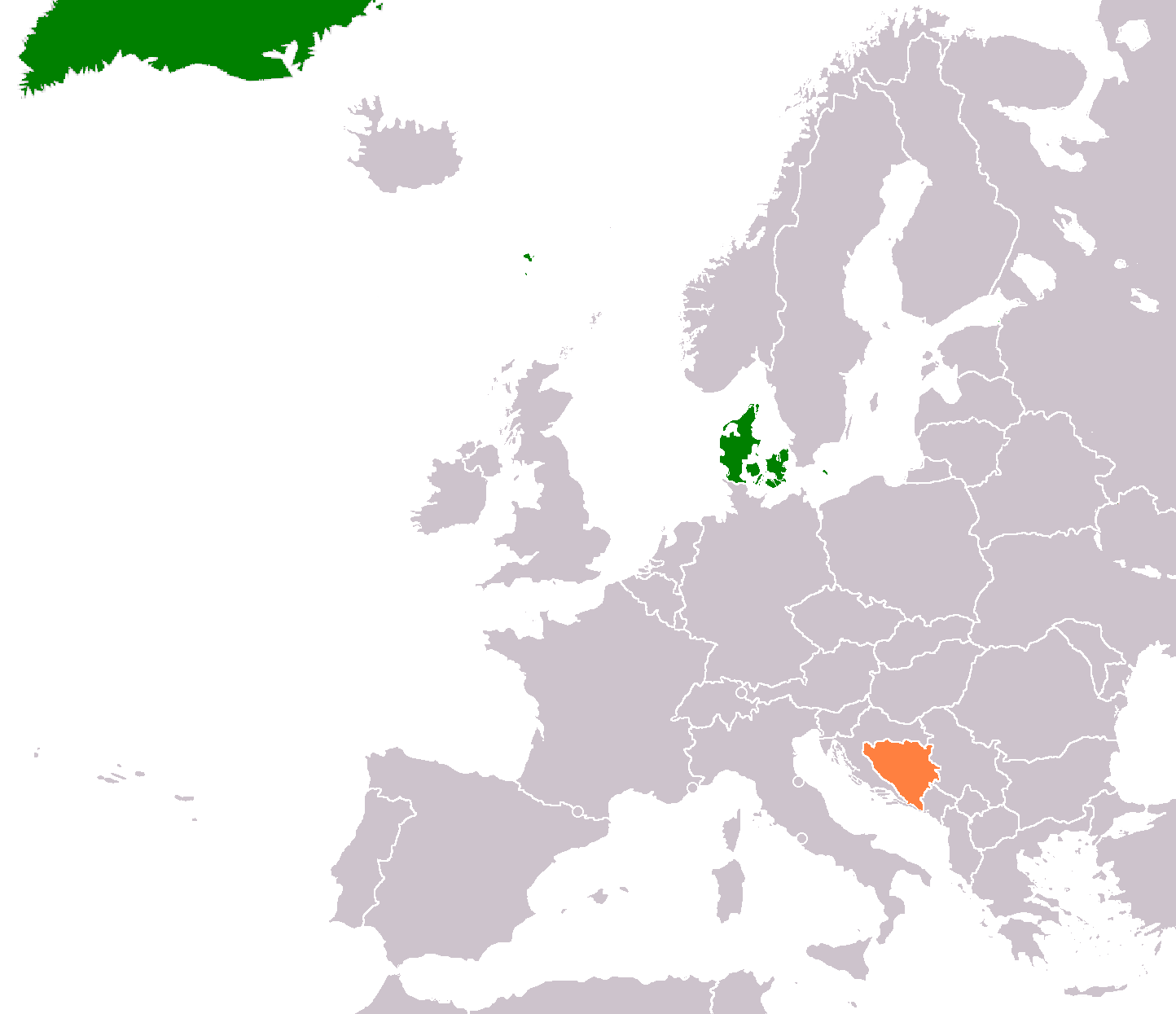

- Denmark: Bosnia and Herzegovina

Bosnia and Herzegovina–Denmark relations refers to the current and historical relations between Bosnia and Herzegovina and Denmark. Bosnia and Herzegovina has an embassy in Copenhagen, and Denmark has an embassy in Sarajevo. Diplomatic relations were established on 2 June 1992. In 2010, Danish Foreign Minister Lene Espersen announced that Denmark will close their embassy in Sarajevo in 2012. Denmark reopened a full embassy in 2024.

During the War in Bosnia and Herzegovina, Operation Bøllebank was the largest combat operation by Danish forces since 1864. In late April, 1994 a Danish contingent on peacekeeping duty in Bosnia and Herzegovina, as part of UNPROFORs Nordic battalion located in Tuzla, was ambushed, when trying to relieve a Swedish observation post, Tango 2, that was under heavy artillery fire by the Bosnian Serb Šekovići brigade at the village of Kalesija, but the ambush was dispersed when the UN forces retaliated with heavy fire. After the war, more than 20,000 Bosnian refugees fled to Denmark.

In 2007, Denmark export to Bosnia amounted 14.2 million euro and Bosnian export amounted 4.1 million euro.

Denmark has supported Bosnia and Herzegovina through many projects since 1995. In the post-war period Danish assistance went to economic reconstruction, infrastructure and environment restructuring. Denmark also supports Bosnia and Herzegovina for micro financing.

On 8 February 2006, Muslims in Sarajevo organized a protest against the Muhammad cartoons. They delivered a letter demanding an apology for the publication of the cartoons to staff at the Danish, Norwegian and French embassies. Bosnia and Herzegovina is an EU candidate and Denmark is also an EU member.

== See also ==
- Foreign relations of Bosnia and Herzegovina
- Foreign relations of Denmark
- Bosnia and Herzegovina-NATO relations
- Accession of Bosnia and Herzegovina to the EU
- Denmark–Yugoslavia relations
