= Bosnia and Herzegovina–France relations =

Bilateral relations between Bosnia and Herzegovina and France

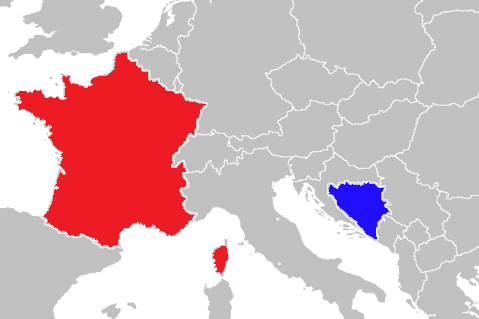

- Bosnia and Herzegovina: France

Diplomatic mission
- Embassy of Bosnia and Herzegovina, Paris: Embassy of France, Sarajevo

Bosnia and Herzegovina–France relations are the foreign relations between Bosnia and Herzegovina and France. France recognised Bosnia and Herzegovina in April 1992. The relationship has been shaped by France’s involvement in post-war peace implementation, EU integration policy, security cooperation, and cultural and educational links.

== Diplomatic relations ==
France maintains an embassy in Sarajevo (Mehmed-bega Kapetanovića Ljubušaka 18), and Bosnia and Herzegovina maintains an embassy in Paris (174, Rue de Courcelles).

The French foreign ministry describes the bilateral relationship as including political dialogue, security engagement, economic ties and cultural cooperation.

== History ==
During the Bosnian War, French President François Mitterrand visited Sarajevo on 28 June 1992, a high-profile diplomatic gesture during the Siege of Sarajevo.

The General Framework Agreement for Peace in Bosnia and Herzegovina (Dayton Peace Agreement) was formally signed in Paris on 14 December 1995.

France is a member of the Peace Implementation Council Steering Board, the body tasked with overseeing implementation of the civilian aspects of the peace settlement under the Dayton framework.

== Economic relations ==
According to the French foreign ministry, trade flows between France and Bosnia and Herzegovina declined slightly in 2023 after a marked increase in 2022, and France remained among Bosnia and Herzegovina’s larger European partners by share of imports and exports. The same source notes that bilateral trade expanded substantially after EU trade provisions with Bosnia and Herzegovina entered into force through an interim agreement in 2008.

Indicator (latest cited)	Figure
Bosnia and Herzegovina import share from France (2023)	1.8% (13th largest supplier)
Bosnia and Herzegovina export share to France (2023)	2.0% (9th largest customer)
French foreign direct investment (FDI) stock in Bosnia and Herzegovina	€14 million (as cited for 2022)

== Security and defence cooperation ==
France has contributed to the EU-led peace support mission Operation Althea (EUFOR) in Bosnia and Herzegovina and is listed among troop contributing countries to the operation. EUFOR describes its mandate as supporting a safe and secure environment and assisting Bosnia and Herzegovina in meeting security-related conditions for EU integration. In 2015 EUFOR marked the end of a French contingent’s deployment at a flag-lowering ceremony in Sarajevo.

France and Bosnia and Herzegovina have concluded agreements on internal security cooperation, including an agreement signed in Paris on 29 March 2010 that was published in France in 2012.

== Cultural and educational links ==
The Institut français in Bosnia and Herzegovina has been present since 2003 and merged in 2014 with the Centre André Malraux; it runs centres in Sarajevo, Banja Luka and Mostar and provides French-language courses and cultural programming.

The Collège International Français de Sarajevo, a trilingual French-English-Bosnian school, was founded in 1998.

== Communities ==
The French foreign ministry has estimated the French community in Bosnia and Herzegovina at just over 400 persons, and the Bosnian and Herzegovinian community in France at around 10,000 (approximately 30,000 including dual nationals).

== Resident diplomatic missions ==
- Bosnia and Herzegovina has an embassy in Paris.
- France has an embassy in Sarajevo.

== See also ==
- Foreign relations of Bosnia and Herzegovina
- Foreign relations of France
- Bosnia and Herzegovina-NATO relations
- Accession of Bosnia and Herzegovina to the EU
- Operation Althea
- France–Yugoslavia relations
