= Bosnia and Herzegovina–Germany relations =

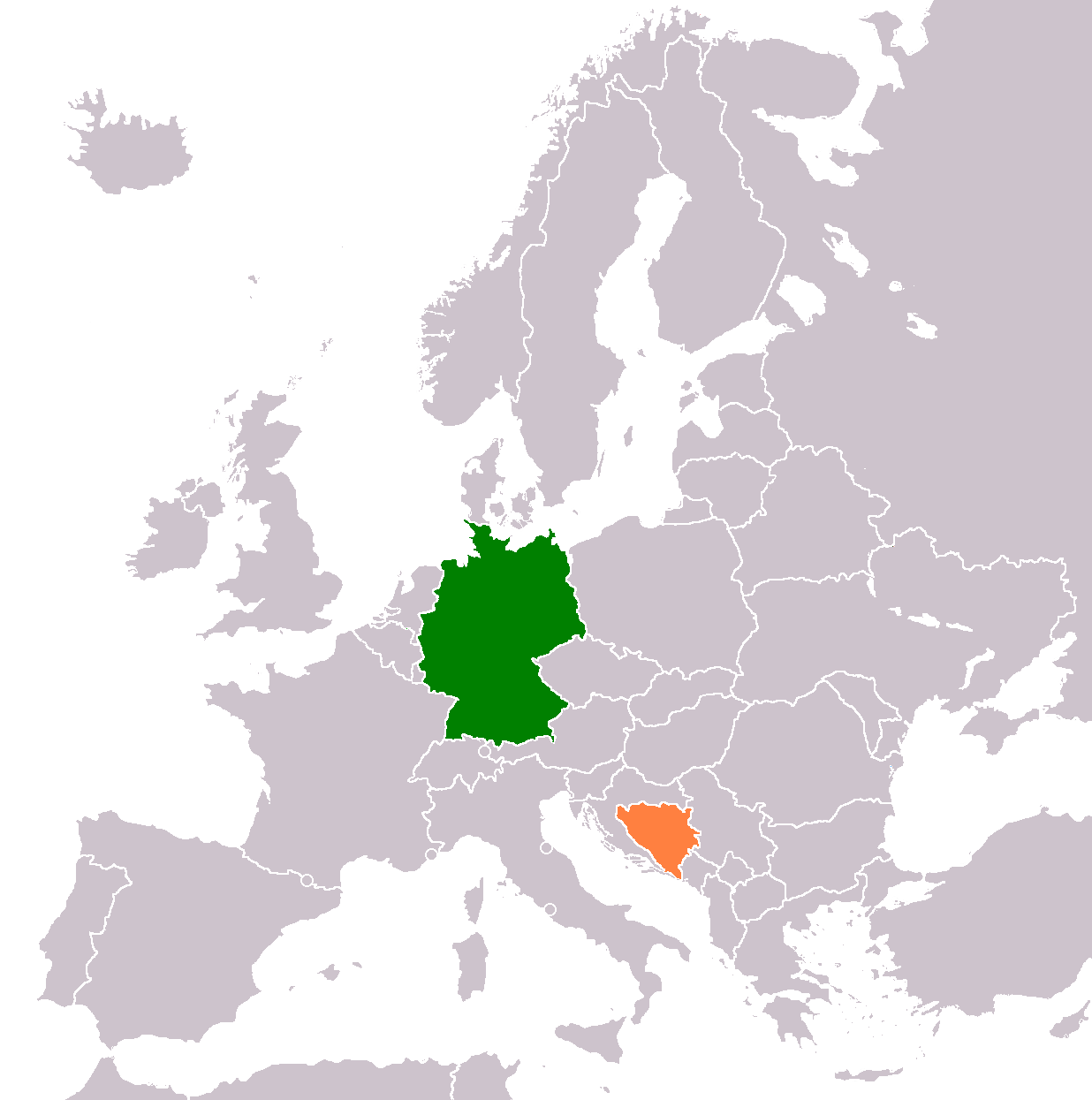

- Germany: Bosnia and Herzegovina

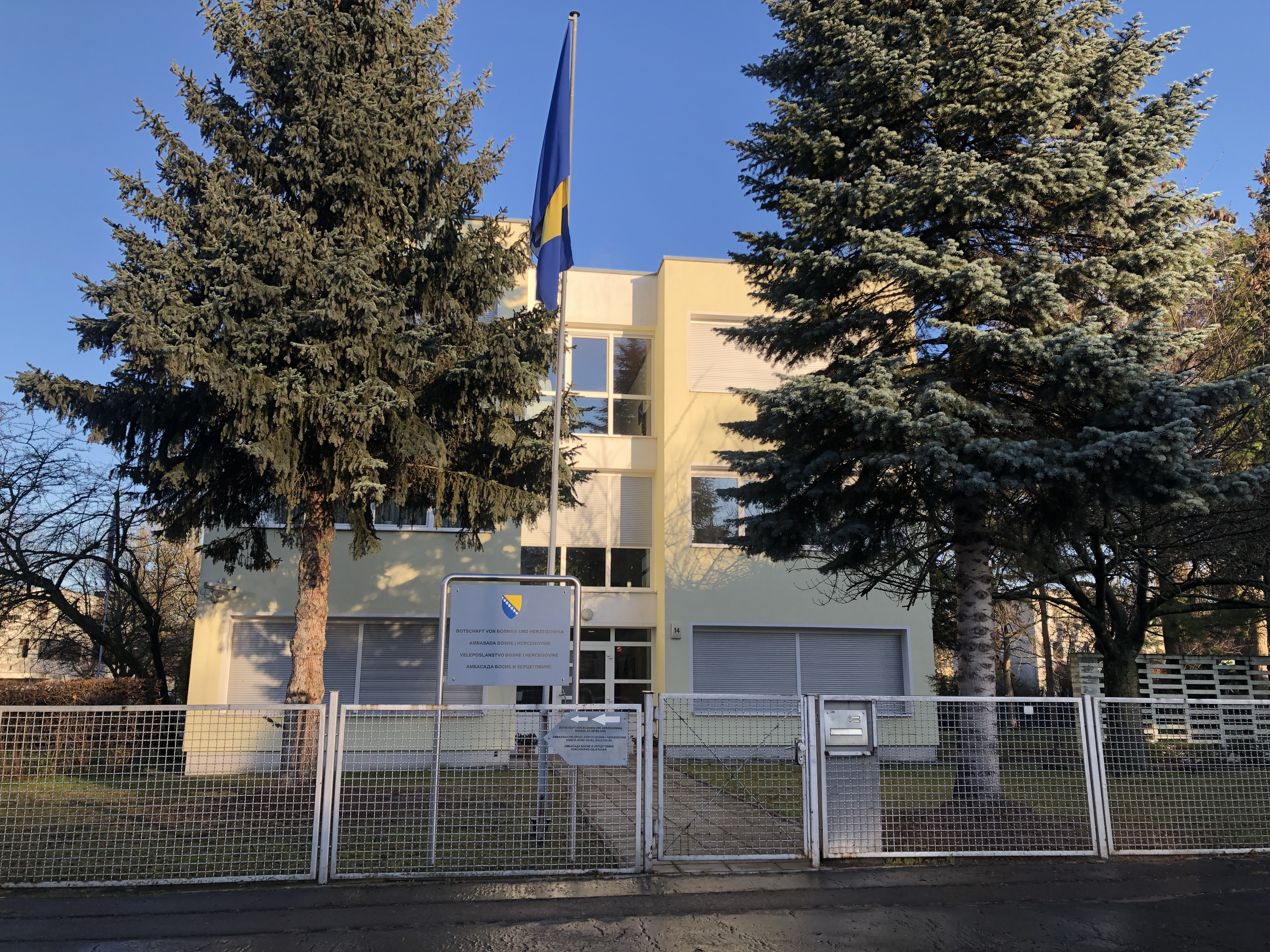
Embassy of Bosnia and Herzegovina, Berlin

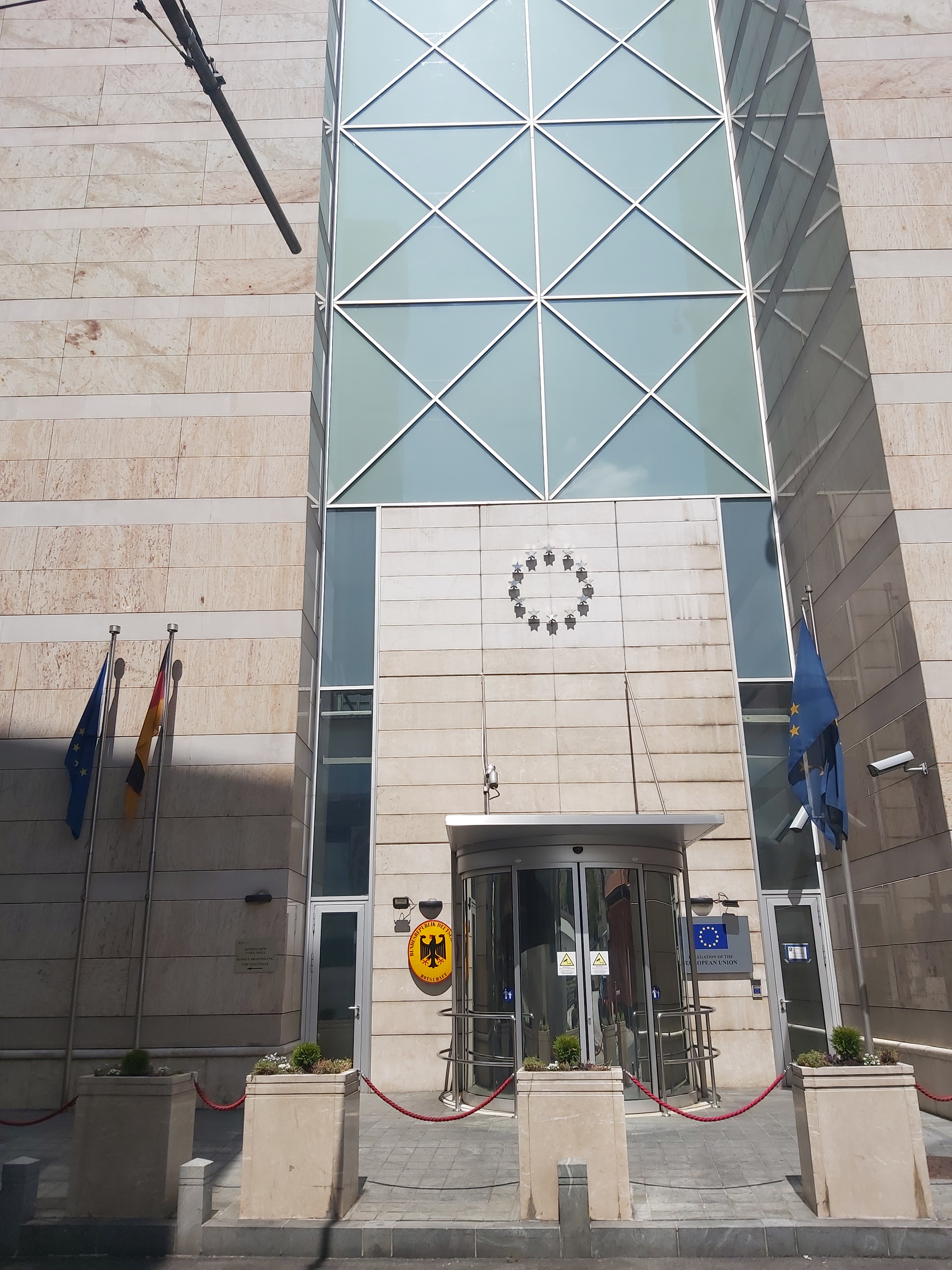
Embassy of Germany, Sarajevo

Bosnia and Herzegovina–Germany relations are the bilateral relations between Bosnia and Herzegovina and the Federal Republic of Germany. Diplomatic relations between Bosnia and Herzegovina and Germany have existed since 1992. Bosnia and Herzegovina has an embassy in Berlin and consulates general in Frankfurt am Main, Munich and Stuttgart. Germany maintains an embassy in Sarajevo.

Both countries are members of the Organization for Security and Cooperation in Europe (OSCE) and the Council of Europe. Bosnia and Herzegovina is an EU candidate and Germany is also an EU member.

== History ==
In the late 13th or early 14th century, German miners, so-called "Saxons" (Sasi), came to Bosnia from Hungary. From 1878 and 1918 respectively, Bosnia and Herzegovina was part of Austria-Hungary and thus was automatically allied with the German Empire in the First World War. After the war, which was lost for the Central Powers, it became part of the newly formed Yugoslavia.

In the Second World War, the Axis powers led by Germany had proclaimed the "Independent State of Croatia" after the invasion of Yugoslavia in 1941. In addition to Croatia, it comprised the whole of Bosnia and Herzegovina. Until 1945, the country suffered under German occupation. After the end of the war, Bosnia and Herzegovina again became part of the now socialist Yugoslavia. As part of the fall of communism in Eastern Europe, Yugoslavia began to disintegrate. Germany recognized the country's independence on April 6, 1992, and established diplomatic relations in November of the same year.

During the Bosnian War, Germany took in the most Bosnian refugees of any EU country, and worked with its international partners to find a peaceful solution to the conflict, including through the International Contact Group and then the Dayton Accords that ended the war. Since the end of the war, Germany has been committed to Bosnia and Herzegovina in a variety of ways, for example within the framework of development cooperation and SFOR or, since 2004, the EUFOR mission Operation Althea, and is today one of the country's most important European partners, also in its efforts to bring it closer to the European Union.

== Economic relations ==
The trade volume between the two countries was 2.1 billion euros in 2021. Germany is an important donor of development aid for Bosnia and Herzegovina. The Kreditanstalt für Wiederaufbau and the Deutsche Gesellschaft für Internationale Zusammenarbeit are active in the country.

== See also ==
- Foreign relations of Bosnia and Herzegovina
- Foreign relations of Germany
- Bosnia and Herzegovina-NATO relations
- Accession of Bosnia and Herzegovina to the EU
- Germany–Yugoslavia relations
