= Bosnia and Herzegovina and the International Monetary Fund =

Bosnia and Herzegovina State Flag

Bosnia and Herzegovina and the International Monetary Fund are the relations between the country of Bosnia and Herzegovina and the International Monetary Fund (IMF). Bosnia and Herzegovina declared independence from the state formerly known as Yugoslavia in 1992 and joined the International Monetary Fund (IMF) on December 14, 1992.

Bosnia and Herzegovina officially succeeded to the IMF membership of the former Yugoslavia on December 20, 1995, thereby giving the country access to the quota, as well as outstanding loans and payments, on behalf of Yugoslavia. Bosnia and Herzegovina, often synecdochically referred to as Bosnia, currently has an IMF quota of 265.20 million SDR (or US$364.01).

Bosnia is part of the constituency that contains primarily Eastern European countries but is led by the Netherlands and Belgium. Bosnia controls 4,117 votes of the constituencies 273,058 total votes, and the constituency overall accounts for 5.43% of the IMF's total votes.

Since Bosnia joined the IMF in 1992, the country has utilized five borrowing arrangements, four of which were under the Stand-By Arrangements (SBA) and one of which was under the Extended Fund Facility (EFF). The first of the five arrangements was enacted in May 1998 and the most recent was enacted in September 2016. As of September 2019, Bosnia has 126.82 million SDR outstanding loans and/or purchases from the IMF.

== History ==
=== Prior to 1992 and the war ===
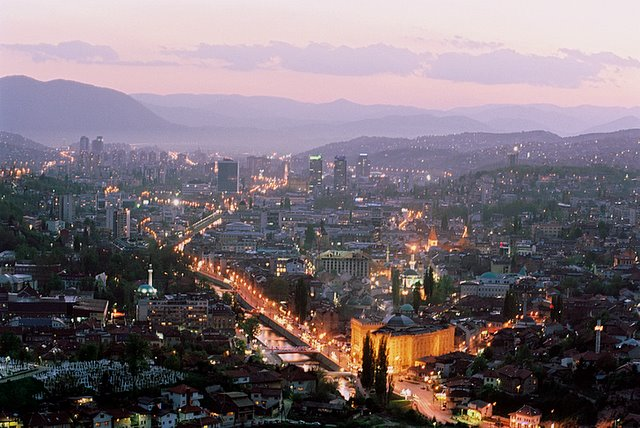
Sarajevo, Capital City of Bosnia and Herzegovina

As a part of Yugoslavia, Bosnia and Herzegovina was relatively peaceful and prosperous, with "high employment, a strong industrial and export oriented economy, good education system and social and medical security for every citizen." This status quo was shattered by the onset of the Bosnian War, which would kill around 100,000 Bosnians and displace around 2.2 million more. The war would also cause an estimated US$221 billion in material damages to Bosnia's economy and cause the countries GDP to fall by 60%.

In the aftermath of the war, Bosnia faced a multi-faceted economic challenge; the struggle to rebuild their infrastructure, as well as begin the transition to an increasingly market based economy instead of their previously mixed economy. As of 2017, Bosnia was US$6.69 billion in debt and had an unemployment rate of 20.47%.

=== 1998 intervention ===
The IMF first intervened in Bosnia and Herzegovina in 1998 in the aftermath of the Bosnian War. In May 1998, the IMF approved a loan of 60.6 million SDR (roughly US$81 million) in an attempt to curtail rampant unemployment, sagging GDP growth, varying levels of inflation around the country. This loan package was under a 12-month Stand-By Arrangement and it made available 24.2 million SDR (roughly US$32 million) immediately, all of which was dispensed that year. The four main tenants of this 1998 agreement are "a fixed exchange rate under a currency board arrangement; budgets that are as supportive as possible of reconstruction and social needs, while avoiding any domestic borrowing; external financial assistance, to help supplement the still-limited domestic resources and promote economic recovery; and acceleration of the transition to a market economy through structural reforms." The structural adjustments included in this agreement include banking reforms, sweeping privatization of enterprise, and the liberalization of trade and market practices.

=== 2002 intervention ===
The second IMF intervention in Bosnia and Herzegovina occurred in the form of a Stand-By Arrangement that was approved on August 2, 2002. This 15 month SBA enabled Bosnia and Herzegovina access to 67.6 million SDR, which is 40% of the countries overall quota. This arrangement was targeted at increasing real GDP growth in the country through a demobilization of the Bosnian military, which will yield annual savings of over 1.15% of the countries overall GDP, as well as measure to strengthen tax policy and improve the countries budget execution. The SBA was also aimed at correcting the balance of payments issues in the country by securing the necessary foreign financing it required.

=== 2009 intervention ===
On July 8, 2009, the IMF approved a 36 month long Stand-By Arrangement program for Bosnia and Herzegovina worth 1.01 billion SDR, or around US$1.57 billion. This arrangement was aimed at mitigating the negative impacts of the 2008 financial crisis on the country, and made 182.63 million SDR, or US$282.37, immediately available. Its specific aims were to improve and safeguard the currency regulation board, further consolidate public finances, ensure adequate liquidity and capitalization among public and private banks, and restore confidence in the country as to maintain and ensure sufficient levels of foreign financing.

=== 2012 intervention ===
On September 26, 2012, the IMF approved a 24 month long Stand-By Arrangement program with Bosnia and Herzegovina worth 338.2 million SDR, or around US$520.6 million. The program immediately made available 50.73 million SDR, or around US$78.1 million, with the express purpose of addressing domestic structural weaknesses in its economic framework. There are four main aims of this arrangement, the first of which is further strengthening the role of the Fiscal Council in order to improve national policy coordination. The other main tenants of this arrangement are to aid fiscal consolidation through continued structural reforms to maintain medium-term economic stability, to further increase the countries crisis preparedness. With these reforms being implemented, the IMF believed that they will catalyze the economic environment and create an environment that will be more conducive to private sector development.

=== 2016 intervention ===
The most recent intervention by the IMF in Bosnia and Herzegovina occurred in 2016 in the form of a three-year loan under the Extended Fund Facility (EFF). The authorized loan amount is 443 million SDR (US$612 million), which is 167% of the countries quota, and 63.4 million SDR (US$87.7 million) of this amount was made available to Bosnia immediately. This loan is aimed at addressing a medium term balance of payments issue, as well as increasing overall economic potential and stability. The three main objectives of this program include structural reforms that attempt to boost private sector employment, gradually decreasing public debt, and reviving bank lending and credit growth.
