= Potential accession of Bosnia and Herzegovina to the European Union =

Ongoing process of joining the EU

Process of potential accession of Bosnia and Herzegovina to the European Union
- Status: Candidate (unscreened)
Application
European perspective	21 June 2003
Potential candidate	21 June 2003
Membership application	15 February 2016
Candidate status	15 December 2022
Screening	December 2023, following certain reforms
Screened & negotiations commence	Not yet applicable
Negotiations
Clusters unopen	Not yet applicable
Chapters unopen	Not yet applicable
Clusters open	Not yet applicable
Chapters open	Not yet applicable
Clusters closed	Not yet applicable
Chapters closed	Not yet applicable
Memberships & Treaties
Association Agreement
Stabilisation and Association Agreement since 1 June 2015
Economic and monetary policy
EU Free Trade Agreement	included in the SAA
World Trade Organization (WTO)	Undergoing the accession process
Euro & the Eurozone	The euro is rarely accepted in BiH, although it has no formal approval, and the official currency of the country is the Bosnia-Herzegovina Convertible Mark
Travel
Schengen visa liberalisation	15 December 2010
Eurocontrol	2004
Energy
Energy Community	20 September 2006
Euratom	There are currently no nuclear power plants or research facilities.
ENTSO-E	NOSBiH
ENTSO-G	BH-Gas
Foreign and military policy
North Atlantic Treaty Organization (NATO)	Membership Action Plan since 5 December 2018 Main article: Bosnia and Herzegovina–NATO relations
Organization for Security and Co-operation in Europe (OSCE)	30 April 1992
Human rights and international courts
International Criminal Court (ICC)	Bosnia has not ratified the Rome Statute, but the ICC has made numerous investigations into the Bosnian genocide
International Court of Justice (ICJ)	Main article: Bosnian genocide case
Impact (27+1)
Population	446,828,803	451,590,396 ▲0.7%
Area	4,233,262 km^{2} 1,634,472 mi^{2}	4,284,481 km^{2} 1,654,258 mi^{2} ▲1.2%
HDI	0.896	0.892 ▼0.4%
GDP (PPP)	$25.399 trillion	$25.467 trillion ▲0.3%
GDP per capita (PPP)	$56,928	$56,394 ▼0.9%
GDP	$17.818 trillion	$17.845 trillion ▲0.15%
GDP per capita	$39,940	$39,515 ▼1.1%
Gini	30.0	30.01 ▲0.3%
Official Languages	24	26 (+Bosnian & +Serbian) ▲ +2 (Croatian is already an official language since Croatia joined the EU in 2013)

The potential accession of Bosnia and Herzegovina is on the agenda for future enlargement of the European Union (EU), having been recognised by the EU as a "candidate country" for accession by a decision of the European Council in 2022. Bosnia and Herzegovina takes part in the Stabilisation and Association Process and trade relations are regulated by an Interim Agreement.

Bosnia and Herzegovina formally applied for EU membership on 15 February 2016, following years of constitutional reforms and engagements with the Dayton Agreement. Bosnia's failure to meet the conditions for the closure of the Office of the High Representative (OHR) in Bosnia and Herzegovina, including addressing state and military property ownership issues and implementing constitutional reforms, had prevented the country from submitting an application until 2016.

On 15 December 2022, the European Council officially granted candidacy status to Bosnia and Herzegovina.

On 12 March 2024, the European Commission recommended opening EU membership talks for Bosnia and Herzegovina. On 21 March 2024, all 27 EU leaders agreed in principle to open EU accession talks with Bosnia and Herzegovina, but it must first fulfill all conditions provided by the Commission. On the same day, it was speculated by Predrag Kojović, a member of parliament for "Naša stranka", that the earliest possible entry in an optimistic scenario would be 2030, with some other figures such as Miro Lazović agreeing with the statement. However, this speculation is heavily challenged by various other statements by both Antonio Tajani and Marta Kos, stating that whilst the rest of the Western Balkans could enter the European Union by 2029-2030 (or earlier), Bosnia and Herzegovina might take more time to be ready to fully join the European Union. Some "pessimists" within the nation and outside of it do not see Bosnia and Herzegovina entering the European Union before 2050.

It is one of nine current EU candidate countries, together with Albania, Georgia, Moldova, Montenegro, North Macedonia, Serbia, Turkey and Ukraine.

== Relations ==
The EU established a regional approach to the Western Balkans in 1997, with political and economic conditionality criteria for the development of bilateral relations. The following year, an EU/Bosnia and Herzegovina Consultative Task Force was put in place to start the process. Since 2006, the task force has been replaced by the Reform Process Monitoring (RPM).

An Interim Agreement on Trade and Trade-related issues was signed and entered into force on 1 July 2008. The Interim Agreement was the legal framework for trade between Bosnia and the EU between 2008 and 2015. Unilateral trade preferences ("Autonomous Trade Measures", ATM) were introduced by the EU for Bosnia and Herzegovina in the year 2000. Trade has increased since 2008 and EU products have been granted reciprocal preference in Bosnia and Herzegovina. The EU is the main trading partner of Bosnia and Herzegovina; 73.5% of the exports from the country went to the EU in 2014, following Croatia's accession.

=== Financial assistance ===
In the 2007–2013 budgetary period, Bosnia and Herzegovina was a beneficiary of the Instrument for Pre-Accession Assistance (IPA) funds. As a "potential candidate country", Bosnia was allowed to finance projects under the first two IPA components, Transition Assistance and Institution Building and Cross-Border Cooperation. The eligibility for the three advanced IPA components would be conditional on Bosnia's acquisition of EU candidacy status and its implementation of a Decentralised Implementation System, streamlining administrative capacities in order to autonomously manage projects and disburse funds with only ex-post Commission controls.

The priorities for IPA action for Bosnia were set in the 2008 European Partnership.

Bosnia and Herzegovina was receiving EUR 822 million of developmental aid until 2020 from the Instrument for Pre-Accession Assistance, a funding mechanism for EU candidate countries.

=== Visa liberalisation process ===
On 1 January 2008, a visa facilitation and readmission agreement between Bosnia and Herzegovina and the EU entered into force. Bosnia and Herzegovina took part in the dialogue for visa liberalisation with Schengen countries, launched by the European Commission on 26 May 2008. On November 8, 2010 the Council of the European Union approved visa-free travel to the EU for citizens of Bosnia and Herzegovina. The decision entered into force on 15 December 2010.

=== EU special representative ===
Peter Sørensen took over the position of EUSR in Bosnia and Herzegovina from September 2011 until October 2014. His post was decoupled from the one of High Representative for Bosnia and Herzegovina (which remained in the hands of Valentin Inzko), and merged with the one of Head of the EU Delegation to BiH, aiming at strengthening the EU pre-accession strategy for Bosnia and Herzegovina. He was replaced by Lars-Gunnar Wigemark. In 2019, Johann Sattler was appointed.

=== CFSP and ESDP operations ===
The European Union Police Mission (EUPM) launched in Bosnia and Herzegovina in 2004 constitutes the first European Security and Defence Policy (ESDP) mission. In the same year, EUFOR Althea replaced NATO's SFOR mission.

=== Stabilisation and Association Process ===
A Stabilisation and Association Process (SAP) for the five countries of the region, including Bosnia and Herzegovina, was proposed in 1999. In June 2000, the European Council in Feira recognised that all the SAP countries are "potential candidates" for EU membership. In November of the same year, the regional SAP process was launched at the Zagreb summit.

The process towards the signature of a Stabilisation and Association Agreement (SAA) began in 2003 with a feasibility study by the Commission on Bosnia and Herzegovina's capacity to implement the SAA. The same year, in June, the European Council in Thessaloniki confirmed the SAP as the main framework of the relations between the EU and the Western Balkans, recalling the perspective of accession for all the countries of the region.

The EU Council adopted a new European Partnership with Bosnia and Herzegovina on 18 February 2008, setting the short-term and mid-term priorities for EU assistance to Bosnia and Herzegovina through IPA funds.

=== Stabilisation and Association Agreement ===
==== Negotiations and signature ====
Negotiations on a Stabilisation and Association Agreement (SAA) – required before applying for membership – started in 2005 and were originally expected to be finalised in late 2007. but negotiations stalled due to a disagreement over police reform.

The SAA was initialled on 4 December 2007 by caretaker Prime Minister Nikola Špirić. The initialing came in the wake of successful negotiations by Miroslav Lajčák in regards to passing his new quorum rules laws and also the commitment of Bosnian and Herzegovinian politicians to implementing police reform. Following the adoption of the police reforms in April 2008, the agreement was signed on 16 June 2008. Reforms promised by the Prud Agreement would "build the ability of the State to meet the requirements of the EU integration process".

==== The blockage of the SAA ====
The final EU state to ratify the SAA, France, did so in February 2011. The SAA should have entered into effect within 40 days but was frozen since Bosnia had not complied with its previous obligations, which would have led to the immediate suspension of the SAA. The obligations to be met by Bosnia before the SAA can come into force include the adoption of a law on state aids and a national census, and implementation of the Finci and Sejdic ruling of the ECHR requiring an amendment to the Constitution to allow members of minorities to be elected to the Presidency of Bosnia and Herzegovina and to gain seats in the House of Peoples. The EU has also required that the country create a single unified body to manage their relations with the EU. The adoption of state laws on the issues above are prevented by the opposition of the government of the Republika Srpska, which considers such issues a matter of exclusive competence of the two entities of Bosnia and Herzegovina.

==== The Croatian initiative ====
In March 2014, Croatian Foreign Minister Vesna Pusić at a session of the Council of the European Union proposed to other EU countries to grant Bosnia and Herzegovina the status of a Special EU Candidate Country in an aide-mémoire submitted during the meeting. Minister Pusić pointed out that Croatia does not suggest lowering the membership criteria but rather that member states should take a proactive stance in cooperation with Bosnia and Herzegovina and not just to put high criteria and then just wait for something to happen. Croatia has also proposed that implementation of the judgment in the case of Sejdić and Finci v. Bosnia and Herzegovina should not anymore be a prerequisite for Bosnia and Herzegovina's progress towards the EU, but that this issue, together with the issue of a new constitutional order of Bosnia and Herzegovina, should be resolved after Bosnia and Herzegovina gets the status of Special EU Candidate country in negotiating chapters 23 and 24.

==== The German-British initiative ====
An initiative of the foreign ministers of Germany and the United Kingdom, Frank-Walter Steinmeier and Philip Hammond, respectively, for the acceleration of the Accession of Bosnia and Herzegovina to the European Union was announced at the so-called Aspen Initiative Meeting of Ministers of Foreign Affairs in late 2014. The two proposed that the SAA enter into force without first implementing the constitutional amendments required by Finci and Sejdic, provided that Bosnian authorities approve a declaration pledging their commitment to making the reforms required for European integration. The foreign ministers called on local Bosnian politicians to begin with necessary reforms as soon as possible after a new government is formed after the 2014 Bosnian general election.

The declaration was jointly signed by the tripartite presidency on 29 January, and approved by parliament on 23 February. The Council of the EU approved the SAA's entry into force on 16 March 2015. The SAA entered into force on 1 June 2015.

==== Domestic reactions to the German-British initiative ====
- Željko Komšić, member of the Presidency of Bosnia and Herzegovina, expressed his support for the initiative at a meeting with the ambassadors of Germany and the United Kingdom.
- Milorad Dodik, former President of Republika Srpska and member of the Presidency, said he supports the initiative as long as it does not affect the constitutional jurisdiction of Republika Srpska.
- The Paneuropean Union of Bosnia and Herzegovina stated that it fully supports the initiative and the letter of the German and British foreign ministers addressed to the citizens of Bosnia and Herzegovina.

==== International reactions to the German-British initiative ====
- High Representative for Bosnia and Herzegovina: The spokesman of the office of the High Representative for Bosnia and Herzegovina stated that the OHR welcomes any initiative that could unblock progress in reforms by increasing the functionality and efficiency of the state and thus speed up the progress of Bosnia and Herzegovina on its path towards the European Union.
- European Union: High Representative of the European Union for Foreign Affairs and Security Policy Federica Mogherini said that she highly appreciates the ideas presented in Berlin and that their aim is for Bosnia and Herzegovina again to begin to move towards European integration.
- United States of America: Jen Psaki, Spokesperson for the United States Department of State, said that the United States welcomes and supports the initiative for reform in Bosnia and Herzegovina, as released by the foreign ministers of Germany and the United Kingdom in Berlin.
- United Kingdom: Philip Hammond stated that regional support is vital for the initiative. He thanked Croatian foreign minister Vesna Pusić for her important work on this issue, and foreign minister of Serbia Ivica Dacic for his valuable cooperation and said that he was delighted they could join the meeting.
- Croatia: Vesna Pusić confirmed that Croatia supports the new German-British initiative for Bosnia and Herzegovina and that this initiative is similar to the original Croatian initiative. Pusić said that Croatia will not only support this initiative, but will also actively participate in it since it is important that Bosnia and Herzegovina is a successful and functional state.
Status of SAA ratification

Event	North Macedonia	Croatia	Albania	Montenegro (Note: Montenegro started negotiations in November 2005 while a part of Serbia and Montenegro. Separate technical negotiations were conducted regarding issues of sub-state organizational competency. A mandate for direct negotiations with Montenegro was established in July 2006. Direct negotiations were initiated on 26 September 2006 and concluded on 1 December 2006.)	Bosnia and Herzegovina	Serbia (Note: Serbia started negotiations in November 2005 while part of Serbia and Montenegro, with a modified mandate from July 2006.)	Kosovo (Note: Kosovo declared independence from Serbia in 2008 but is still claimed by Serbia as part of its territory. The European Union remains divided, with five EU member states not recognizing its independence. The EU launched a Stabilisation Tracking Mechanism for Kosovo on 6 November 2002 with the aim of aligning its policy with EU standards. On 10 October 2012 the European Commission found that there were no legal obstacles to Kosovo signing a SAA with the EU, as independence is not required for such an agreement.)
SAA negotiations start	2000-04-05	2000-11-24	2003-01-31	2005-10-10	2005-11-25	2005-10-10	2013-10-28
SAA initialled	2000-11-24	2001-05-14	2006-02-28	2007-03-15	2007-12-04	2007-11-07	2014-07-25
SAA/IA signature	2001-04-09	2001-10-29	2006-06-12	2007-10-15	2008-06-16	2008-04-29	2015-10-27
Interim Agreement:
EC ratification	2001-04-27	2002-01-30	2006-06-12	2007-10-15	2008-06-16	2009-12-08	N/A (Note: No Interim Agreement associated with Kosovo's SAA was concluded.)
SAP state ratification	2001-04-27	2002-01-30	2006-10-09	2007-11-14	2008-06-20	2008-09-22	N/A
entry into force	2001-06-01	2002-03-01	2006-12-01	2008-01-01	2008-07-01	2010-02-01	N/A
Deposit of the instrument of ratification:
SAP state	2001-04-27	2002-01-30	2006-11-09	2007-11-13	2009-02-26	2008-09-22	2016-02-26
Austria	2002-09-06	2002-03-15	2008-05-21	2008-07-04	2009-09-04	2011-01-13	N/A
Belgium	2003-12-29	2003-12-17	2008-10-22	2010-03-29	2010-03-29	2012-03-20	N/A
Bulgaria	joined the EU later			2008-05-30	2009-03-13	2010-08-12	N/A
Croatia	joined the EU later						N/A
Cyprus	joined the EU later		2008-05-30	2008-11-20	2009-07-02	2010-11-26	N/A
Czech Republic	joined the EU later		2008-05-07	2009-02-19	2009-07-23	2011-01-28	N/A
Denmark	2002-04-10	2002-05-08	2008-04-24	2008-06-25	2009-05-26	2011-03-04	N/A
Estonia	joined the EU later		2007-10-17	2007-11-22	2008-09-11	2010-08-19	N/A
Finland	2004-01-06	2004-01-06	2007-11-29	2009-03-18	2009-04-07	2011-10-21	N/A
France	2003-06-04	2003-06-04	2009-02-12	2009-07-30	2011-02-10	2012-01-16	N/A
Germany	2002-06-20	2002-10-18	2009-02-19	2009-11-16	2009-08-14	2012-02-24	N/A
Greece	2003-08-27	2003-08-27	2009-02-26	2010-03-04	2010-09-20	2011-03-10	N/A
Hungary	joined the EU later		2007-04-23	2008-05-14	2008-10-22	2010-11-16	N/A
Ireland	2002-05-06	2002-05-06	2007-06-11	2009-06-04	2009-06-04	2011-09-29	N/A
Italy	2003-10-30	2004-10-06	2008-01-07	2009-10-13	2010-09-08	2011-01-06	N/A
Latvia	joined the EU later		2006-12-19	2008-10-17	2009-11-12	2011-05-30	N/A
Lithuania	joined the EU later		2007-05-17	2009-03-04	2009-05-04	2013-06-26	N/A
Luxembourg	2003-07-28	2003-08-01	2007-07-04	2009-06-11	2010-12-22	2011-01-21	N/A
Malta	joined the EU later		2008-04-21	2008-12-11	2010-01-07	2010-07-06	N/A
Netherlands	2002-09-09	2004-04-30	2007-12-10	2009-01-29	2009-09-30	2012-02-27	N/A
Poland	joined the EU later		2007-04-14	2009-02-06	2010-04-07	2012-01-13	N/A
Portugal	2003-07-14	2003-07-14	2008-07-11	2008-09-23	2009-06-29	2011-03-04	N/A
Romania	joined the EU later			2009-01-15	2010-01-08	2012-05-22	N/A
Slovakia	joined the EU later		2007-07-20	2008-07-29	2009-03-17	2010-11-11	N/A
Slovenia	joined the EU later		2007-01-18	2008-02-07	2009-03-10	2010-12-07	N/A
Spain	2002-10-04	2002-10-04	2007-05-03	2009-03-12	2010-06-15	2010-06-21	N/A
Sweden	2002-06-25	2003-03-27	2007-03-21	2009-03-11	2009-09-14	2011-04-15	N/A
United Kingdom	2002-12-17	2004-09-03	2007-10-16	2010-01-12	2010-04-20	2011-08-11	N/A
European Communities or European Union and Euratom	2004-02-25	2004-12-21	2009-02-26	2010-03-29	2015-04-30	2013-07-22	2016-02-24 (Note: Kosovo's SAA was the first signed after the entry into force of the Lisbon treaty, which conferred a legal personality to the EU. As a result, unlike previous SAAs Kosovo's is exclusively between it and the EU and Euratom, and the member states are not parties independently.)
SAA entry into force	2004-04-01	2005-02-01	2009-04-01	2010-05-01	2015-06-01	2013-09-01	2016-04-01
EU membership (SAA lapsed)	(TBD)	2013-07-01	(TBD)	(TBD)	(TBD)	(TBD)	(TBD)

N/A: Not applicable.

== Public opinion ==
A 2019 poll sponsored by the National Democratic Institute found that there was overall support of accession to the EU of 75%. There was somewhat of a split over ethnic lines:

- Bosniaks - 88% support, 10% oppose.
- Croats - 75% support, 21% oppose.
- Serbs - 54% support, 39% oppose.

According to public-opinion surveys conducted by the Directorate for European Integration (DEI), support for Bosnia and Herzegovina’s accession to the European Union has shown a gradual decline over recent years, while remaining above a simple majority.

In hypothetical referendum polling, the share of respondents who stated they would vote in favour of EU membership was 80.6% in 2021, 77.4% in 2022, 73.3% in 2023, and 71.2% in 2024. In 2026 it was 74.4%.

Year	Support for EU membership (BiH overall)
2021	80.6%
2022	77.4%
2023	73.3%
2024	71.2%
2026	74.4%

The 2024 survey also provided an entity-level breakdown of support. In a hypothetical referendum held in 2024, 83.8% of respondents in the Federation of BiH stated they would vote in favour of EU membership, compared with 48.3% in Republika Srpska and 75.1% in the Brčko District. The percentages grew everywhere except Brčko District in 2026.

Entity	Support for EU membership (2024)	Support for EU membership (2026)
Federation of BiH	83.8%	86.1%
Republika Srpska	48.3%	54.1%
Brčko District	75.1%	74.7%

According to the 2025 annual survey of opinion in Bosnia and Herzegovina, 56% of citizens have a positive attitude towards the EU (17% very positive, 39% fairly positive), while trust in the EU is 72%. It is also revealed that 67% of citizens would vote in favour of BiH's membership of the EU if a referendum was held, while 84% of citizens believe that EU memebership would bring more advantages than disadvantages.

The Balkan Barometer 2025, presented in December 2025 by the Regional Cooperation Council, reported that 59 % of citizens in Bosnia and Herzegovina support the country’s membership in the European Union.

== Membership application ==
Bosnia and Herzegovina formally applied for EU membership on 15 February 2016, following years of constitutional reforms and engagements with the Dayton Peace Agreement. The failure of Bosnia to meet the conditions for the closure of the Office of the High Representative (OHR) in Bosnia and Herzegovina, including addressing state and military property ownership issues and implementing constitutional reforms, had prevented the country from submitting an application until 2016.

On 9 December 2016, Bosnia and Herzegovina received the accession questionnaire from the European Commission and the responses to the questionnaire were submitted in February 2018. On 20 June 2018, the European Commission sent 655 follow-up questions to the Questionnaire. Presidency Chairman of Bosnia and Herzegovina at the time, Milorad Dodik, handed over the answers to the additional questions on 5 March 2019. An opinion on Bosnia's application was published by the European Commission in May 2019. Twenty-two policy and political criteria questions were still unanswered when Bosnia and Herzegovina submitted its latest response on 5 March 2019. It remains a potential candidate country until it can successfully answer all of the questions on the European Commission's questionnaire sheet as well as "ensure the functioning of the Stabilisation and Association Parliamentary Committee and develop a national programme for the adoption of the EU acquis".

On 12 October 2022, the European Commission recommended that candidate status be granted to Bosnia and Herzegovina by the Council, on the understanding that a number of steps are taken. These include the fulfillment of 14 key concepts proposed by the EU that seek progress in the strengthening of democracy and human rights, as well as 8 further objectives that must be met: "judicial reform, prevention of conflicts of interests, fight against corruption and organised crime, border and migration management, media freedom, protection of journalists and the creation of preventive mechanisms against torture and ill-treatment." On 15 December 2022, the European Council officially granted candidacy status to Bosnia and Herzegovina. It is one of nine current EU candidate countries, together with Albania, Georgia, Moldova, Montenegro, North Macedonia, Serbia, Turkey and Ukraine.

On 2 March 2022, two former High Representatives for Bosnia and Herzegovina Valentin Inzko and Christian Schwarz Schilling appealed to the EU for a faster accession of Bosnia and Herzegovina, citing the Russian invasion of Ukraine the previous week.

On 12 June 2022, several political leaders in Bosnia and Herzegovina were called to Brussels on the request of Charles Michel, the president of the European Council. Most of the participants of the meeting in Brussels, which lasted more than eight hours, accepted the document "Political Agreement on Principles for Ensuring a Functional BiH". The goals of the agreement were ensuring a functional Bosnia and Herzegovina that advances on the European path, defines the commitment to preserve and build a peaceful, stable, sovereign and independent functional European Bosnia and Herzegovina. While also being committed to respecting the rule of law and conducting free and democratic elections. The importance of implementing reforms, which improve the European integration of BiH, is emphasized.

On 3 September 2022, the president of Slovenia Borut Pahor expressed his views "The first thing is for Serbia, Montenegro, North Macedonia and Albania to speed up the negotiations for joining the EU, for Bosnia and Herzegovina to receive candidate status by the end of Sunday, and for the EU to fulfill its obligation on visa liberalization". This caused confusion in Bosnia and Herzegovina since there was no previous mention from the Slovenian President regarding the candidate status of Bosnia and Herzegovina.

On 6 September 2022, Bosnia and Herzegovina signed an agreement with the European Union regarding it joining the European Civil Protection Mechanism. This agreement allowed Bosnia and Herzegovina to use all the benefits of EU members, to receive support and assistance in terms of education, equipment, schooling, but also to eliminate the consequences of natural disasters.

On 12 October 2022, the European Commission recommended that candidate status be granted to Bosnia and Herzegovina by the Council, on the understanding that a number of steps are taken:

1. adoption of the integrity amendments in the existing law of the High Judicial and Prosecutorial Council;
2. adoption of a new law on the High Judicial and Prosecutorial Council;
3. adoption of the law on Courts of Bosnia and Herzegovina;
4. adoption of the law on prevention of conflict of interest;
5. enhancement on fight against corruption and organised crime;
6. advance work on border management and migration management, as well as ensuring the functioning of the asylum system;
7. ensuring prohibition of torture, notably the establishment of a national preventive mechanism against torture and ill-treatment;
8. guaranteeing freedom of expression and freedom of the media;
9. adoption of a national programme for the adoption of the EU acquis.

On 15 December 2022, the European Council officially granted candidacy status to Bosnia and Herzegovina.

== Chronology of Relations with the European Union ==
Timeline
Date	Event
1997	Regional approach to the Western Balkans established.
June 2003	Bosnia and Herzegovina identified as a potential candidate for EU membership during the Thessaloniki European Council summit.
25 November 2005	Stabilisation and Association Agreement (SAA) negotiations officially opened in Sarajevo.
31 July 2007	Bosnia and Herzegovina & EU sign financing agreement for the instrument for pre-accession assistance (IPA) 2007 National Programme.
18 September 2007	Visa facilitation and readmission agreements signed.
4 December 2007	EU initials Stabilization and Association Agreement.
1 January 2008	Visa facilitation and readmission agreements enter into force.
18 February 2008	Council adopts new European partnership programme.
16 June 2008	Stabilization and Association Agreement and Interim Agreement on trade and trade-related issues signed.
1 July 2008	Interim Agreement on trade and trade-related issues enters into force.
27 May 2010	Commission adopts proposal allowing citizens of Albania & Bosnia and Herzegovina to travel to Schengen countries without a short-term visa.
15 December 2010	Visa free regime for Schengen area introduced for all BiH citizens having a biometric passport.
1 September 2011	Delegation of the European Union and Office of the EU Special Representative become one reinforced EU presence.
27 June 2012	The EU and Bosnia and Herzegovina launch the High Level Dialogue on the Accession Process.
1 June 2015	The SAA with Bosnia and Herzegovina enters into force.
15 February 2016	BiH submits its application to join the EU.
20 September 2016	EU Council invites the Commission to present an Opinion on BiH application.
February 2018	Bosnia and Herzegovina sends accession questionnaire back to the European Commission.
20 June 2018	European Commission sends 655 follow-up questions to the Questionnaire.
5 March 2019	Bosnia and Herzegovina submits most responses to follow-up questions.
29 May 2019	European Commission notes progress but the country still needs to enact some constitutional changes as well as "ensure the functioning of the Stabilisation and Association Parliamentary Committee and develop a national programme for the adoption of the EU acquis."
12 June 2022	Brussels Agreement, whose goal is to advance Bosnia and Herzegovina on its European path, is accepted.
23 June 2022	The European Council invites the European Commission to report on Bosnia and Herzegovina's progress.
6 September 2022	Bosnia and Herzegovina joins the EU Mechanism for Civil protection.
12 October 2022	The European Commission recommends that candidate status be granted to Bosnia and Herzegovina by the European Council, with nine conditions to be implemented.
15 December 2022	The European Council grants candidate status to Bosnia and Herzegovina.
12 March 2024	The European Commission recommends opening membership negotiations with Bosnia and Herzegovina.
21 March 2024	The European Council agrees to open membership negotiations with Bosnia and Herzegovina.

== Negotiations ==
Negotiation talks have not yet started. However, the European Commission has given an opinion on the status of various reforms since 2019.

The 2023 enlargement package report was released by the European Commission on 8 November 2023, including updates on Bosnia' acquis alignment and a recommendation for the Council to open accession negotiations once certain conditions were met.

On 12 March 2024, the European Commission recommended for EU membership negotiations to open for Bosnia and Herzegovina, praising the country's progress on undertaking important reforms. The Commission's Directorate-General for Neighbourhood and Enlargement Negotiations claimed, among other things, that "the public commitment of the political leadership to the strategic goal of European integration was taken forward by important reforms and have brought positive results. Bosnia and Herzegovina has shown strong commitment to move forward on long pending reforms such as the adoption of the law on the prevention of conflict of interests and the law on anti-money laundering and countering terrorist financing. Bosnia and Herzegovina has taken significant steps to improve the judiciary and prosecutorial system, the fight against corruption organised crime and terrorism and to improve migration management, with the approval of a mandate to negotiate a Frontex status agreement. Bosnia and Herzegovina has reached and maintained full alignment with the EU Common Foreign and Security Policy, which is a significant positive step and crucial in these times of geopolitical turmoil."

The European Commission also agreed to release its progress report to the Council.

On 21 March 2024, at a summit in Brussels, all 27 EU leaders, representing the European Council, unanimously agreed to grant a conditional approval for the opening of EU accession negotiations with Bosnia and Herzegovina. European Council President Charles Michel welcomed the decision, with talks set to begin following the implementation of more reforms.

The next step of the process towards becoming a negotiating candidate is for the European Commission to prepare a negotiating framework for adoption by the Council. However, this can only take place once all relevant steps set out in the Commission's recommendation of 12 October 2022 have been taken by Bosnia and Herzegovina. As of 3 July 2024, this final condition for negotiations to start had not yet been met. The state claimed to meet 98% of conditions demanded by the European Commission by passing a 2024 budget and Growth Plan reform package on 19 July 2024. Final approval of the Growth Plan reform package was however blocked by four cantons on 25 July. In December 2024, the Council reiterated that they still needed to receive an approved Growth Plan reform package along with a national programme for adoption of EU law, and that the country should appoint a chief negotiator and a national IPA III coordinator, before the adoption of a negotiation framework can happen as the next step of the process. The reform package was eventually approved by the Council of Ministers of Bosnia and Herzegovina in October 2025, and the European Commission in December.

On 31 July 2023, the United States Office of Foreign Assets Control imposed sanctions on four leaders from Republika Srpska (a federal entity of Bosnia and Herzegovina) that were directly responsible for encouraging the passage of a National Assembly of Republika Srpska law that purported to declare the decisions of the Constitutional Court of Bosnia and Herzegovina inapplicable in Republika Srpska, and hereby endangering regional security, peace and cooperation for the Western Balkans by obstructing and threatening the implementation of the Dayton Agreement. On 25 December 2024, the National Assembly of Republika Srpska adopted conclusions on an alleged erosion of the legal order in Bosnia and Herzegovina, claiming the Dayton Agreement had been violated by illegal actions made by the current as well as all past High Representatives, the Constitutional Court and Prosecutor's Office. The National Assembly demanded "annulment of all acts resulting from unconstitutional actions by foreign individuals (High Representatives) who lack the constitutional authority to propose or enact laws", and "requires representatives from Republika Srpska in state institutions to suspend decisions related to European integration (as well as all decision-making concerned to the overall level of the country) until the process aligns with democratic principles and the rule of law".

Ambassadors from Germany, France, Italy, US, UK and EU immediately condemned the move made by the National Assembly on 25 December 2024, and called it a serious threat to the constitutional order of Bosnia and Herzegovina, emphasizing that all decisions made by the National Assembly should respect the Constitution and be in compliance with all previous and future decisions made by the Constitutional Court. The High Representative issued an order on 2 January 2025 that prohibited the implementation with immediate legal effect of the entirety of these adopted conclusions from 24–25 December 2024, due to having found them to violate Republika Srpska's obligations and commitments under the Dayton Agreement. The President of Republika Srpska, Milorad Dodik, followed up by stating that the political goal of his current government was secession of Republika Srpska from Bosnia and Herzegovina. The Minister of Foreign Affairs of Bosnia and Herzegovina, Elmedin Konakovic, condemned the statement made by Dodik, which he alleged was an attempt to block the country’s European path in favor of Russian interests.

On 8 January 2025, Dodik further elaborated that he would seriously reconsider whether Republika Srpska should pursue the European path, as he instead preferred efforts to secede the entity from Bosnia and Herzegovina, and rejected the authority of the Constitutional Court and High Representative. The Delegation of the European Union to Bosnia and Herzegovina stated in response: "The sovereignty, territorial integrity, constitutional order – including Constitutional Court decisions – and international personality of Bosnia and Herzegovina need to be respected. The EU urges the political leadership of the Republika Srpska to refrain from and renounce provocative, divisive rhetoric and actions, including questioning the sovereignty, unity and territorial integrity of the country. The EU urges all political actors in BiH to take resolute action to implement the necessary reforms to advance on the EU path towards opening EU accession negotiations. We reiterate our full commitment to the EU accession perspective of BiH as a single, united and sovereign country".

In April 2026, The Guardian reported that the European Union had intervened over the Southern Interconnection gas pipeline project in Bosnia and Herzegovina, which is linked to a US company, warning that legislation facilitating the award of the contract without a public tender could jeopardize the country's progress toward EU membership. In the same month, N1 reported statements by EU ambassador Luigi Soreca that Bosnia and Herzegovina also risked losing funds from the EU Growth Plan because of continued delays in adopting the Reform Agenda, which he linked to the country's broader European path.

Chapter and screening dates
Progression	0 / 35 0% complete	0 / 35 0% complete	0 / 35 0% complete	0 / 35 0% complete
Acquis chapter	Screening started	Screening completed	Chapter opened	Chapter closed
Overview	0 out of 35	0 out of 35	0 out of 35	0 out of 35
1. Free Movement of Goods				
2. Freedom of Movement For Workers				
3. Right of Establishment & Freedom To Provide Services				
4. Free Movement of Capital				
5. Public Procurement				
6. Company Law				
7. Intellectual Property Law				
8. Competition Policy				
9. Financial Services				
10. Information Society & Media				
11. Agriculture & Rural Development				
12. Food Safety, Veterinary & Phytosanitary Policy				
13. Fisheries				
14. Transport Policy				
15. Energy				
16. Taxation				
17. Economic & Monetary Policy				
18. Statistics				
19. Social Policy & Employment				
20. Enterprise & Industrial Policy				
21. Trans-European Networks				
22. Regional Policy & Coordination of Structural Instruments				
23. Judiciary & Fundamental Rights				
24. Justice, Freedom & Security				
25. Science & Research				
26. Education & Culture				
27. Environment & Climate Change				
28. Consumer & Health Protection				
29. Customs Union				
30. External Relations				
31. Foreign, Security & Defence Policy				
32. Financial Control				
33. Financial & Budgetary Provisions				
34. Institutions				
35. Other Issues				

November 2026 European Commission Report
Acquis chapter	Status as of November 2026	Chapter Status as of November 2026
Overview	13 chapters in early stage, 1 chapter in early stage/with some preparation, 16 chapter with some level of preparation, 1 chapter with some/moderate preparation, 2 chapters with a moderate level of preparation	33 unopened chapters
1. Free Movement of Goods	Early stage	Chapter unopened
2. Freedom of Movement For Workers	Some level of preparation	Chapter unopened
3. Right of Establishment & Freedom To Provide Services	Early stage	Chapter unopened
4. Free Movement of Capital	Moderately prepared	Chapter unopened
5. Public Procurement	Some level of preparation	Chapter unopened
6. Company Law	Some level of preparation	Chapter unopened
7. Intellectual Property Law	Moderately prepared	Chapter unopened
8. Competition Policy	Some level of preparation	Chapter unopened
9. Financial Services	Some / Moderate	Chapter unopened
10. Information Society & Media	Early stage	Chapter unopened
11. Agriculture & Rural Development	Early stage	Chapter unopened
12. Food Safety, Veterinary & Phytosanitary Policy	Some level of preparation	Chapter unopened
13. Fisheries	Early stage	Chapter unopened
14. Transport Policy	Some level of preparation	Chapter unopened
15. Energy	Early stage	Chapter unopened
16. Taxation	Some level of preparation	Chapter unopened
17. Economic & Monetary Policy	Early stage	Chapter unopened
18. Statistics	Early stage	Chapter unopened
19. Social Policy & Employment	Some level of preparation	Chapter unopened
20. Enterprise & Industrial Policy	Early stage	Chapter unopened
21. Trans-European Networks	Some level of preparation	Chapter unopened
22. Regional Policy & Coordination of Structural Instruments	Early stage	Chapter unopened
23. Judiciary & Fundamental Rights	Some level of preparation	Chapter unopened
24. Justice, Freedom & Security	Some level of preparation	Chapter unopened
25. Science & Research	Some level of preparation	Chapter unopened
26. Education & Culture	Early stage	Chapter unopened
27. Environment & Climate Change	Early stage / Some	Chapter unopened
28. Consumer & Health Protection	Early stage	Chapter unopened
29. Customs Union	Some level of preparation	Chapter unopened
30. External Relations	Some level of preparation	Chapter unopened
31. Foreign, Security & Defence Policy	Some level of preparation	Chapter unopened
32. Financial Control	Some level of preparation	Chapter unopened
33. Financial & Budgetary Provisions	Early stage	Chapter unopened
34. Institutions	Nothing to adopt	Nothing to adopt
35. Other Issues	Nothing to adopt	Nothing to adopt
Legend: Well advanced Good / Well advanced Good level of preparation Moderate / Good Moderately prepared Some / Moderate Some level of preparation Early stage / Some Early stage

Report history
Clusters	Acquis Chapter	May 2019	October 2020	October 2021	October 2022	November 2023	October 2024	November 2025	November 2026
1. Fundamentals	Public administration reform	-	Early stage	Early stage	Early stage	Early stage	Early stage / Some	Early stage / Some	Early stage / Some
1. Fundamentals	23. Judiciary & Fundamental Rights	Some level of preparation	Some level of preparation	Some level of preparation	Some level of preparation	Some level of preparation	Some level of preparation	Some level of preparation	Some level of preparation
1. Fundamentals	24. Justice, Freedom & Security	Some level of preparation	Some level of preparation	Some level of preparation	Some level of preparation	Some level of preparation	Some level of preparation	Some level of preparation	Some level of preparation
1. Fundamentals	Economic criteria	-	Early stage	Early stage	Early stage	Early stage	Early stage	Early stage	Early stage
1. Fundamentals	5. Public Procurement	Some level of preparation	Some level of preparation	Some level of preparation	Some level of preparation	Some level of preparation	Some level of preparation	Some level of preparation	Some level of preparation
1. Fundamentals	18. Statistics	Early stage	Early stage	Early stage	Early stage	Early stage	Early stage	Early stage	Early stage
1. Fundamentals	32. Financial Control	Early stage	Early stage	Early stage	Some level of preparation	Some level of preparation	Some level of preparation	Some level of preparation	Some level of preparation
2. Internal Market	1. Free Movement of Goods	Early stage	Early stage	Early stage	Early stage	Early stage	Early stage	Early stage	Early stage
2. Internal Market	2. Freedom of Movement For Workers	Some level of preparation	Some level of preparation	Some level of preparation	Some level of preparation	Some level of preparation	Some level of preparation	Some level of preparation	Some level of preparation
2. Internal Market	3. Right of Establishment & Freedom To Provide Services	Early stage	Early stage	Early stage	Early stage	Early stage	Early stage	Early stage	Early stage
2. Internal Market	4. Free Movement of Capital	Moderately prepared	Moderately prepared	Moderately prepared	Moderately prepared	Moderately prepared	Moderately prepared	Moderately prepared	Moderately prepared
2. Internal Market	6. Company Law	Some level of preparation	Some level of preparation	Some level of preparation	Some level of preparation	Some level of preparation	Some level of preparation	Some level of preparation	Some level of preparation
2. Internal Market	7. Intellectual Property Law	Moderately prepared	Moderately prepared	Moderately prepared	Moderately prepared	Moderately prepared	Moderately prepared	Moderately prepared	Moderately prepared
2. Internal Market	8. Competition Policy	Some level of preparation	Some level of preparation	Some level of preparation	Some level of preparation	Some level of preparation	Some level of preparation	Some level of preparation	Some level of preparation
2. Internal Market	9. Financial Services	Some level of preparation	Some / Moderate	Some / Moderate	Some / Moderate	Some / Moderate	Some / Moderate	Some / Moderate	Some / Moderate
2. Internal Market	28. Consumer & Health Protection	Early stage	Early stage	Early stage	Early stage	Early stage	Early stage	Early stage	Early stage
3. Competitiveness; and inclusive growth	10. Information Society & Media	Early stage	Early stage	Early stage	Early stage	Early stage	Early stage	Early stage	Early stage
3. Competitiveness; and inclusive growth	16. Taxation	Some level of preparation	Some level of preparation	Some level of preparation	Some level of preparation	Some level of preparation	Some level of preparation	Some level of preparation	Some level of preparation
3. Competitiveness; and inclusive growth	17. Economic & Monetary Policy	Early stage	Early stage	Early stage	Early stage	Early stage	Early stage	Early stage	Early stage
3. Competitiveness; and inclusive growth	19. Social Policy & Employment	Early stage	Some level of preparation	Some level of preparation	Some level of preparation	Some level of preparation	Some level of preparation	Some level of preparation	Some level of preparation
3. Competitiveness; and inclusive growth	20. Enterprise & Industrial Policy	Early stage	Early stage	Early stage	Early stage	Early stage	Early stage	Early stage	Early stage
3. Competitiveness; and inclusive growth	25. Science & Research	Some level of preparation	Some level of preparation	Some level of preparation	Some level of preparation	Some level of preparation	Some level of preparation	Some level of preparation	Some level of preparation
3. Competitiveness; and inclusive growth	26. Education & Culture	Early stage	Early stage	Early stage	Early stage	Early stage	Early stage	Early stage	Early stage
3. Competitiveness; and inclusive growth	29. Customs Union	Some level of preparation	Some level of preparation	Some level of preparation	Some level of preparation	Some level of preparation	Some level of preparation	Some level of preparation	Some level of preparation
4. Green agenda; and sustainable connectivity	14. Transport Policy	Early stage	Some level of preparation	Some level of preparation	Some level of preparation	Some level of preparation	Some level of preparation	Some level of preparation	Some level of preparation
4. Green agenda; and sustainable connectivity	15. Energy	Early stage	Early stage	Early stage	Early stage	Early stage	Early stage	Early stage	Early stage
4. Green agenda; and sustainable connectivity	21. Trans-European Networks	Some level of preparation	Some level of preparation	Some level of preparation	Some level of preparation	Some level of preparation	Some level of preparation	Some level of preparation	Some level of preparation
4. Green agenda; and sustainable connectivity	27. Environment & Climate Change	Some level of preparation	Early stage / Some	Early stage / Some	Early stage / Some	Early stage / Some	Early stage / Some	Early stage / Some	Early stage / Some
5. Resources, agriculture; and cohesion	11. Agriculture & Rural Development	Early stage	Early stage	Early stage	Early stage	Early stage	Early stage	Early stage	Early stage
5. Resources, agriculture; and cohesion	12. Food Safety, Veterinary & Phytosanitary Policy	Some level of preparation	Some level of preparation	Some level of preparation	Some level of preparation	Some level of preparation	Some level of preparation	Some level of preparation	Some level of preparation
5. Resources, agriculture; and cohesion	13. Fisheries	Early stage	Early stage	Early stage	Early stage	Early stage	Early stage	Early stage	Early stage
5. Resources, agriculture; and cohesion	22. Regional Policy & Coordination of Structural Instruments	Early stage	Early stage	Early stage	Early stage	Early stage	Early stage	Early stage	Early stage
5. Resources, agriculture; and cohesion	33. Financial & Budgetary Provisions	Some level of preparation	Early stage	Early stage	Early stage	Early stage	Early stage	Early stage	Early stage
6. External relations	30. External Relations	Some level of preparation	Some level of preparation	Some level of preparation	Some level of preparation	Some level of preparation	Some level of preparation	Some level of preparation	Some level of preparation
6. External relations	31. Foreign, Security & Defence Policy	Some level of preparation	Some level of preparation	Some level of preparation	Some level of preparation	Some level of preparation	Some level of preparation	Some level of preparation	Some level of preparation
	34. Institutions	N/A	N/A	N/A	N/A	N/A	N/A	N/A	N/A
	35. Other Issues	N/A	N/A	N/A	N/A	N/A	N/A	N/A	N/A
Legend: Well advanced Good / Well advanced Good level of preparation Moderate / Good Moderately prepared Some / Moderate Some level of preparation Early stage / Some Early stage

== Bosnia and Herzegovina's foreign relations with EU member states ==
- Austria
- Belgium
- Bulgaria
- Croatia
- Cyprus
- Czech Republic
- Denmark
- Estonia
- Finland
- France
- Germany
- Greece
- Hungary
- (Republic of Ireland) Ireland
- Italy
- Latvia
- Lithuania
- Luxembourg
- Malta
- Netherlands
- Poland
- Portugal
- Romania
- Slovakia
- Slovenia
- Spain
- Sweden

== See also ==
- Bosnia and Herzegovina–NATO relations
- Yugoslavia–European Communities relations
- Bosnia and Herzegovina–Croatia relations
- Euro-Slavism
- Germany–United Kingdom Initiative for Bosnia and Herzegovina
- Enlargement of the European Union
- Potential enlargement of the European Union
