= Bosnia and Herzegovina–Russia relations =

- Bosnia and Herzegovina: Russia

Diplomatic mission
- Embassy of Bosnia and Herzegovina, Moscow: Embassy of the Russian Federation, Sarajevo

Bosnia and Herzegovina–Russia relations are the bilateral relations between the two countries, Bosnia and Herzegovina and Russia. Bosnia is one of the countries where Russia has contributed troops for the NATO-led stabilization force. Russia recognized the independence of Bosnia and Herzegovina on 27 April 1992.

== History ==
At the beginning of 12 January 1996, Russia had sent troops in Sarajevo, the capital of Bosnia and Herzegovina, via Tuzla. The move was motivated, in part, by the desire to improve relations with the United States. Location of Russian troops deployment became subject of an international debate: The Russians wanted to be deployed in the Bosnian Serb territory, and the U.S. wanted them deployed in Bosnian Croat territory. During the 1999 Kosovo events, the 1996 agreement on joint operations in Bosnia was cited as an example of successful Russia-NATO cooperation.

Russian position on post-war reconstruction of Bosnia remains, as of 2008, in line with the Western policy. In particular, in October 2007 Russia upheld the Western denial of ethnic voting (defended by the Serbian minority and the government of Serbia).

In 2022 a number of Russian diplomats declared persona non grata by other countries have relocated to Bosnia and Herzegovina and been accredited, despite being identified with the Russian intelligence and security services.

During the 2022 Russian invasion of Ukraine, Igor Kalabukhov, Russia's ambassador to Bosnia and Herzegovina, said that Russia would “react” if Bosnia decides to join NATO, in an apparent reference to using military force.

== Resident diplomatic missions ==
- Bosnia and Herzegovina has an embassy in Moscow.
- Russia has an embassy in Sarajevo.
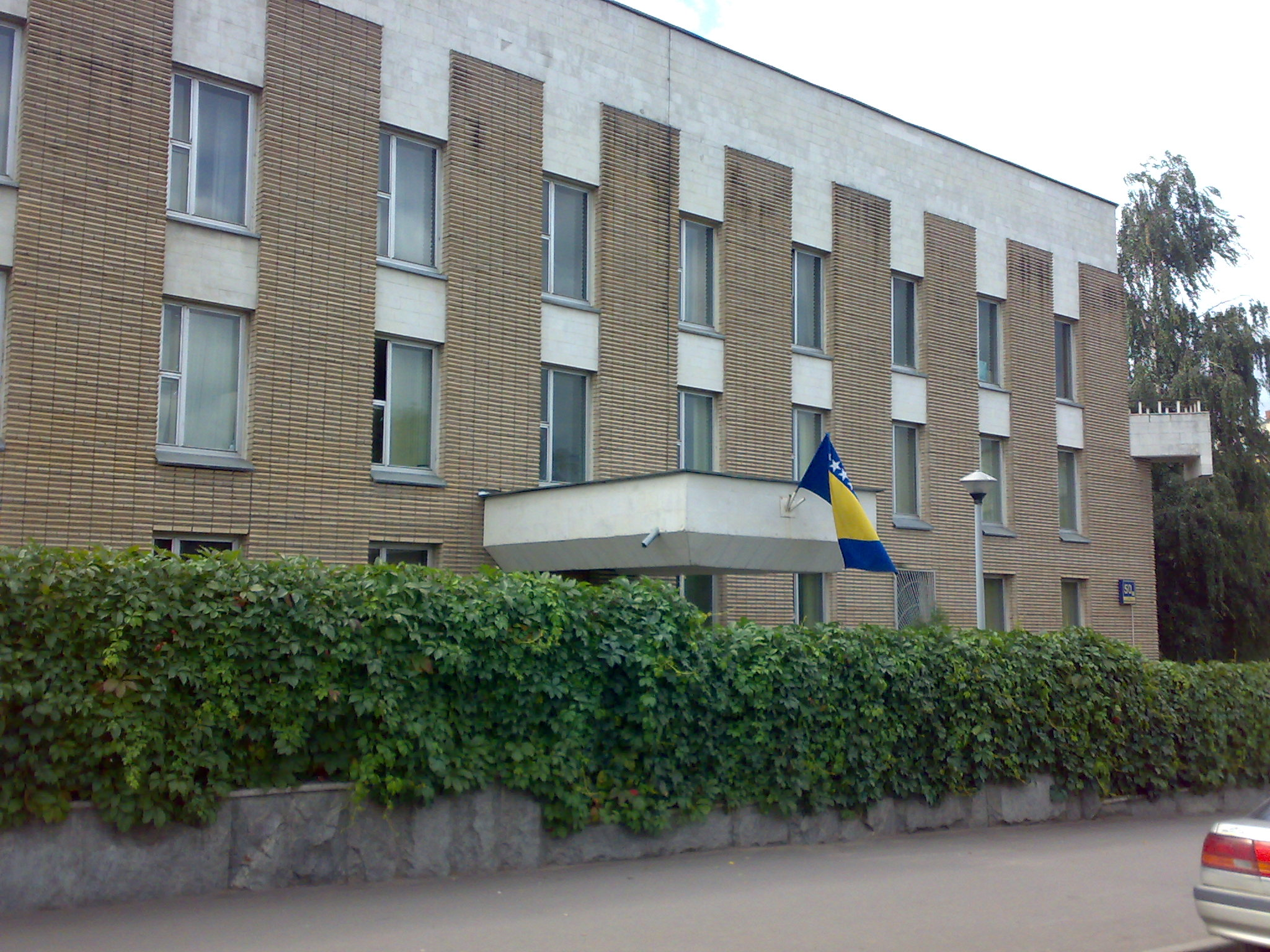
Embassy of Bosnia and Herzegovina in Moscow

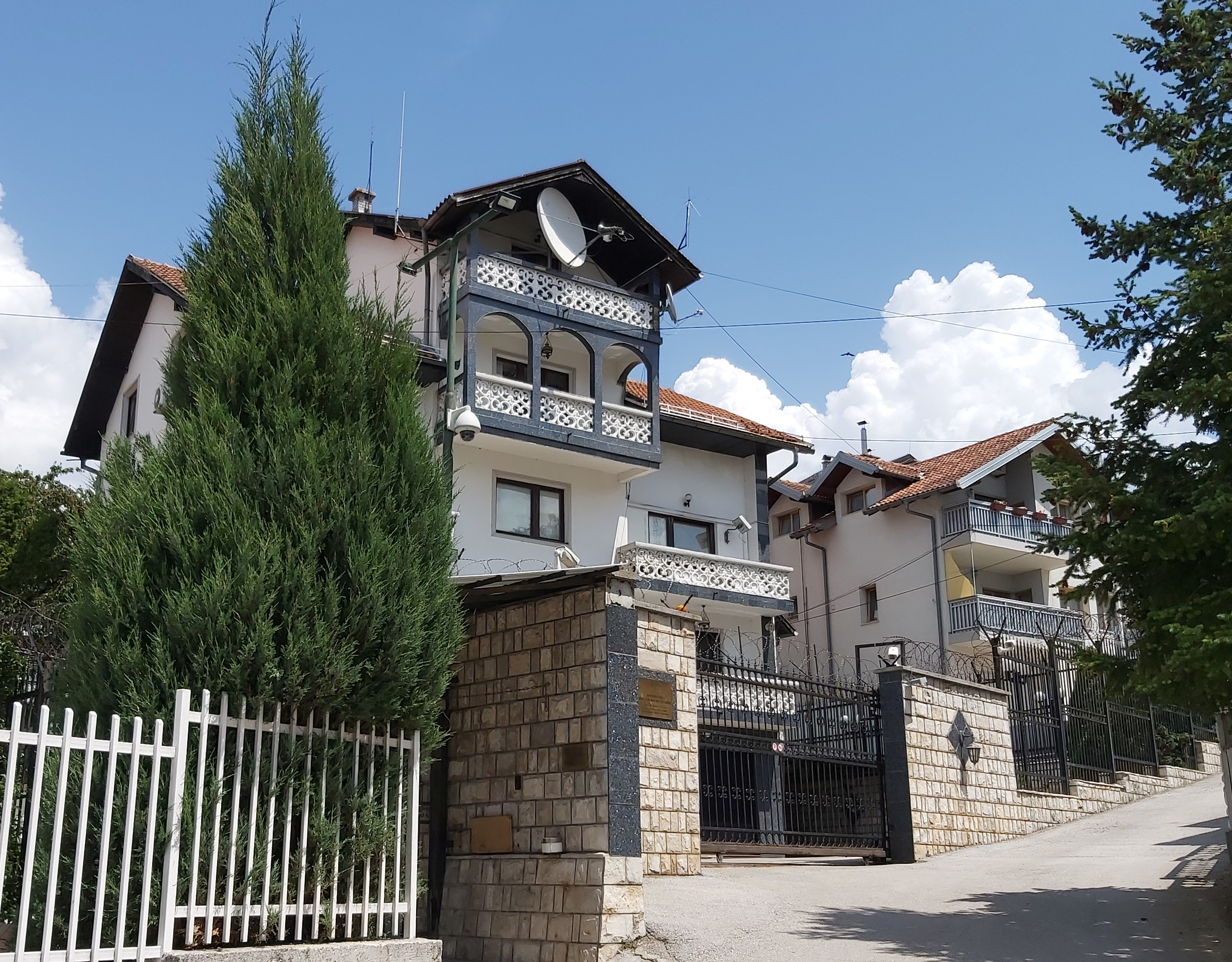
Embassy of Russia in Sarajevo

== See also ==
- Foreign relations of Bosnia and Herzegovina
- Foreign relations of Russia
- Bosnia and Herzegovina–NATO relations
- Bosnia and Herzegovina–United States relations
- Soviet Union–Yugoslavia relations
