= Ostružnja Gornja =

- Village
- Location within Bosnia and Herzegovina
- Coordinates: 44°45′N 17°53′E
- Country: Bosnia and Herzegovina
- Entity: Republika Srpska
- Municipality: Stanari
- Time zone: UTC+1 (CET)
  - Summer (DST): UTC+2 (CEST)

Ostružnja Gornja (Cyrillic: Остружња Горња) is a village in the municipality of Stanari, Bosnia and Herzegovina.

The village is home to the Ostružnja Association of Romanians (Удружење Румуна "Остружња", Udruženje Rumuna "Ostružnja"), a cultural association for the small Romanian minority of the village, composed of 53 families with around 350 members in total. Romanians are a legally recognized minority in Republika Srpska.
