= Bosnia and Herzegovina–United Kingdom relations =

- Bosnia and Herzegovina: United Kingdom

Diplomatic mission
- Bosnian and Herzegovinian Embassy, London: British Embassy, Sarajevo

The United Kingdom and Bosnia Herzegovina on a map.

Bosnia and Herzegovina and the United Kingdom established diplomatic relations on 13 April 1992.

Both countries share common membership of the Council of Europe, the International Criminal Court, and the OSCE. Bilaterally the two countries have a Double Taxation Convention, an Investment Agreement, and a Reciprocal Healthcare Agreement. Bosnia and Herzegovina is a candidate country for both the EU and NATO, while the United Kingdom is a former EU member and currently a member of NATO.

== Economic relations ==
From 1 July 2008 until 30 December 2020, trade between Bosnia and Herzegovina, and the UK was governed by the Bosnia and Herzegovina–European Union Stabilisation and Association Process, while the United Kingdom was a member.

Following the withdrawal of the United Kingdom from the European Union, the UK offered Bosnia and Herzegovina a continuity trade agreement based on the EU free trade agreement, however the agreement was signed by neither country. On 9 June 2021, Minister of State for Trade Policy Greg Hands stated that the UK government remained ready to conclude the trade agreement, while the Government of Bosnia and Herzegovina were considering their position on the trade agreement.

== Diplomatic missions ==
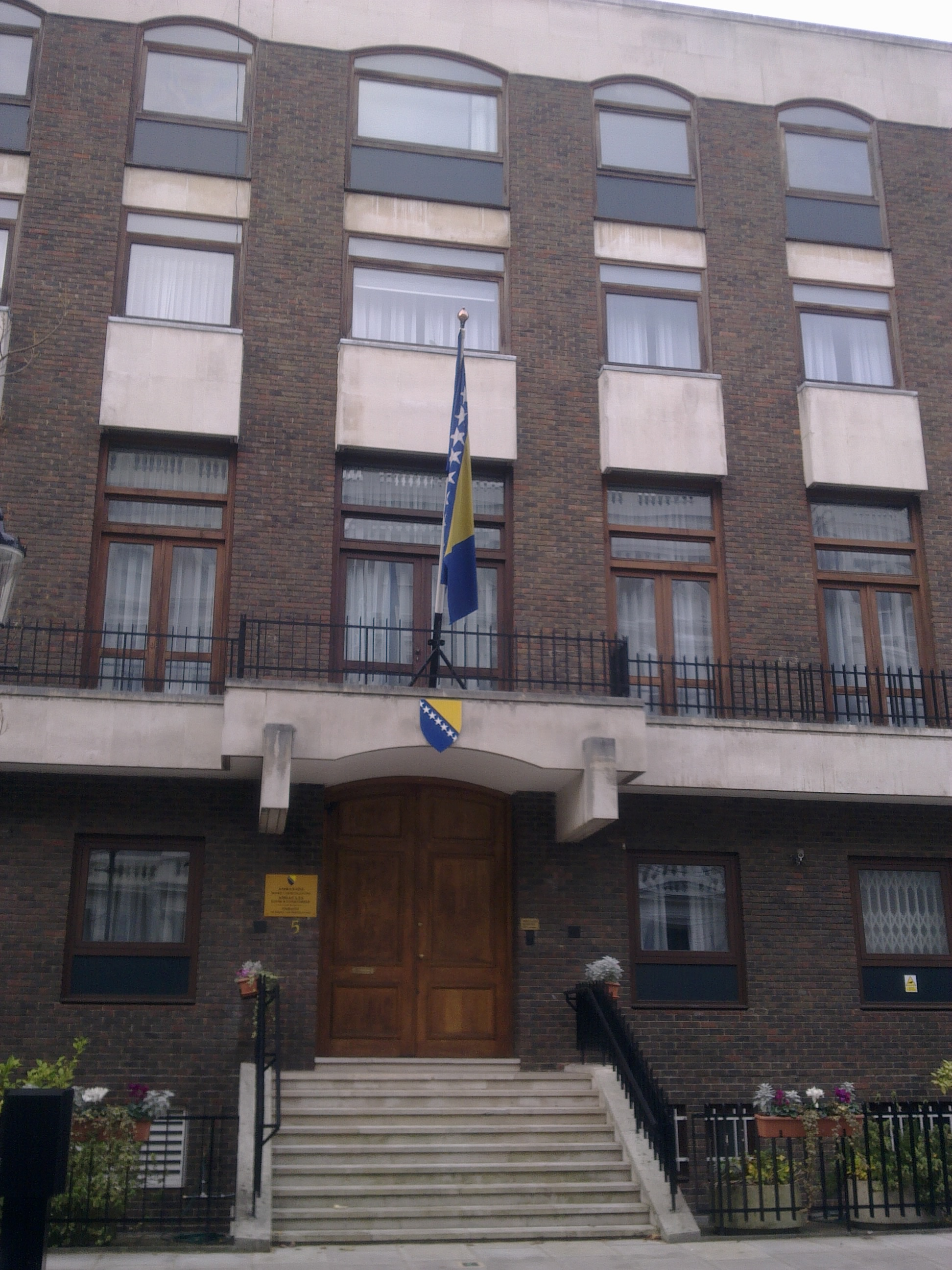
Embassy of Bosnia and Herzegovina, London

- Bosnia and Herzegovina maintains an embassy in London.
- The United Kingdom is accredited to Bosnia and Herzegovina through its embassy in Sarajevo.

== See also ==
- Foreign relations of Bosnia and Herzegovina
- Foreign relations of the United Kingdom
- United Kingdom–Yugoslavia relations
