= History of post-communist Albania =

In 1991, the Socialist Party of Albania, with specific social democratic ideology took control of the country through democratic elections. One year later the Democratic Party of Albania won the new elections. After 1990, Albania has been seeking a closer relationship with the West. What followed were deliberate programs of economic and democratic reform, but the implementation of capitalism led to the proliferation of pyramid schemes. Chaos in late 1996 to early 1997, as a result of the collapse of these pyramid schemes, alarmed the world and prompted the influx of international peacekeeping forces. In 1995, Albania was accepted into the Council of Europe and requested membership in NATO (obtained in 2009) and is a potential candidate country for accession to the European Union. The workforce of Albania has continued to emigrate to Western countries, especially Greece and Italy.

== Early 1990s ==
After the collapse of communism in Albania and the loosening of emigration restrictions, most of Albania's Jewish community emigrated in the early 1990s to Israel.

== 1994 ==
Albania's postcommunist transformation continues, with more progress in some areas than others. Greek-Albanian relations deteriorate, and Athens blocks European Union loans to Tirana, impeding Albania's much-needed integration into Europe. Gross domestic product grows by 8%, and inflation continues its downward spiral. Unemployment, remains the country's vulnerability; more than 300,000 workers are unemployed. Some $400 million sent home by Albanian emigrants play a vital role in boosting the domestic economy by increasing the volume of disposable income. For most, economic hardship and widespread poverty are the norm. Albania's foreign debt continues to soar. The political climate is relatively stable, but hostility between ruling and opposition forces continues to surface. The Socialist Party and other political groups accuse President Sali Berisha of becoming increasingly authoritarian. Albania makes considerable progress in foreign affairs, although relations with some of its neighbours continue to be fraught with problems. The impasse in relations between Belgrade and Tirana persists, but ties with Bulgaria, Turkey, the Republic of Macedonia, and Italy further improve. Relations with Greece raise worries about a new Balkan flash point.

- April 1994

Following a raid on an army training camp in which two Albanian conscripts were killed, Tirana arrests five ethnic Greeks, finds them guilty of espionage and illegal possession of weapons, and sentences them to between six and eight years in prison. Angered by the verdict, (the court was being held behind closed doors, no international observers were allowed) Athens reportedly expels as many as 70,000 of the 300,000 illegal Albanian immigrants living in Greece.

- April 1994

Fatos Nano is convicted of embezzling state funds during his premiership in 1991 and sentenced to 12 years' imprisonment; the ruling is upheld by an appeals court in the following month.

- July 1994

Ramiz Alia is tried on a number of charges, including forced deportation of political prisoners, summary executions, and the upholding of the 1967 ban on religious activity. The charges are later changed to abuse of power and violation of citizens' rights. Alia pleads "not guilty" and protests that the allegations made against him are unclear; he is convicted, however, and sentenced to 9 years' imprisonment.

- October 4, 1994

A draft constitution is presented to Berisha. Failing to obtain the requisite two-thirds majority approval for it in the People's Assembly, Berisha calls for a national referendum, the first of its kind. The November 6 vote goes against Berisha (53.9% of voters reject the draft constitution), perpetuating the deadlock with the Socialists.

- November 1994

Alia's prison sentence is reduced to five years.

== 1995 ==
Berisha still faces formidable political, economic, and social problems. The leading opposition Socialist Party threatens the Democratic Party's hold on power, while the latter cites notable successes in economic and foreign affairs and predicts victory in the parliamentary elections scheduled for March 1996. Among the 49 new legislative decisions approved by the People's Assembly in 1995 are land and property laws that positively affect the flow of domestic and foreign investments, especially in the field of agriculture. The process of privatization continues, with some 1,400 small-sized enterprises privatized. Albania's $700 million foreign debt is substantially reduced. Gross domestic product grows by an estimated 6%, and inflation drops to about 10%. The agricultural, construction, and private-service sectors register high rates of growth - 15%, 90%, and 25%, respectively. The industrial sector remains the weakest economic link, with continued production losses. Exports also lag. Continued progress is made in foreign affairs, with the exception of an impasse between Tirana and Belgrade. A slight improvement in Greek-Albanian relations is evidenced. U.S.-Albanian military cooperation develops quickly. Joint projects in 1995 include U.S. intelligence-gathering flights to Bosnia and Herzegovina from bases in Albania, exchanges of high-level military delegations, medical and military exercises, and the construction of Albania's only military hospital.

- March 1995

The chairman of the Democratic Party, Eduard Selami, is dismissed at an extraordinary party congress for opposing Berisha's efforts to organize a further referendum for the draft constitution. Selami is replaced by Tritan Shehu.

- April 1995

Squatters at Bathore fight off eviction, briefly taking Shehu hostage.

- May 1995

Italy deploys troops along its coast to stem the continued influx of Albanian illegal immigrants.

- June 1995

Ilir Hoxha, son of Enver Hoxha, is convicted of inciting national hatred for denouncing leaders of the Democratic Party in a newspaper interview.

- July 1995

Albania is admitted to the Council of Europe.

- July 7, 1995

The Supreme Court orders the immediate release of Alia, owing to the provisions of a new penal code, which took effect at the beginning of June. Also in July the case against Vilson Ahmeti is abandoned, owing to a lack of evidence.

- September 1, 1995

As a result of an agreement between Albania and 41 Western banks, the country's debt owed to those institutions drops from $500 million to $100 million.

- September 1995

A first-ever meeting between U.S. and Albanian heads of state occurs. See also: Albania–United States relations

- November 27, 1995

Nano's prison sentence is reduced to 4 years. On December 30 Berisha reduces his sentence by a further 8 months.

- December 15–16, 1995

14 prominent communist politicians are arrested, including former defense minister Prokop Murra and former president Haxhi Lleshi.

== 1996 ==
Gross domestic product grows by an estimated 8%, while inflation rises by about 4-5%, mainly owing to the introduction of a value-added tax. Unemployment drops to a total of 170,000, or about 13%. The agricultural and especially the construction and private-service sectors continue to register robust two-digit growth. Remittances from Albanian émigrés in Greece, Italy, Germany, and the U.S. still account for an estimated 20% of GDP. The nation's relationship with Greece is improved when a high-ranking Greek official visits Albania, and a number of important cooperation agreements are signed. The impasse between Tirana and Belgrade continues, although ethnic Albanians from Kosovo are allowed to travel to Albania. Tirana dispatches a 33-man peacekeeping force to the German contingent of IFOR (the NATO-led Implementation Force) in Bosnia and Herzegovina, the first time in the country's history that Albanian troops have been stationed abroad.

- Early 1996

Albania receives an aid package from the U.S. worth $100 million.

- February 2, 1996

Alia is rearrested and charged with crimes against humanity.

- March 6, 1996

The former chief of the Sigurimi is arrested following bomb attacks in Tirana on February 26 and in Durrës on March 6.

- May 26, 1996

The third postcommunist parliamentary elections plunge Albania into its deepest political crisis since the demise of communist rule. Hours before the polls close, all major opposition parties pull out their candidates, accusing the ruling Democratic Party of engineering widespread election irregularities. Riot police violently break up a protest rally. On June 2 a second round is held, again boycotted by most of the opposition. The chairman of the Central Electoral Commission puts turnout at 59% compared to 89% in the first round. Final results give the ruling Democratic Party 122 seats in the 140-seat parliament (87% of the vote). The Socialists refuse to recognize the results and do not take their nine seats.

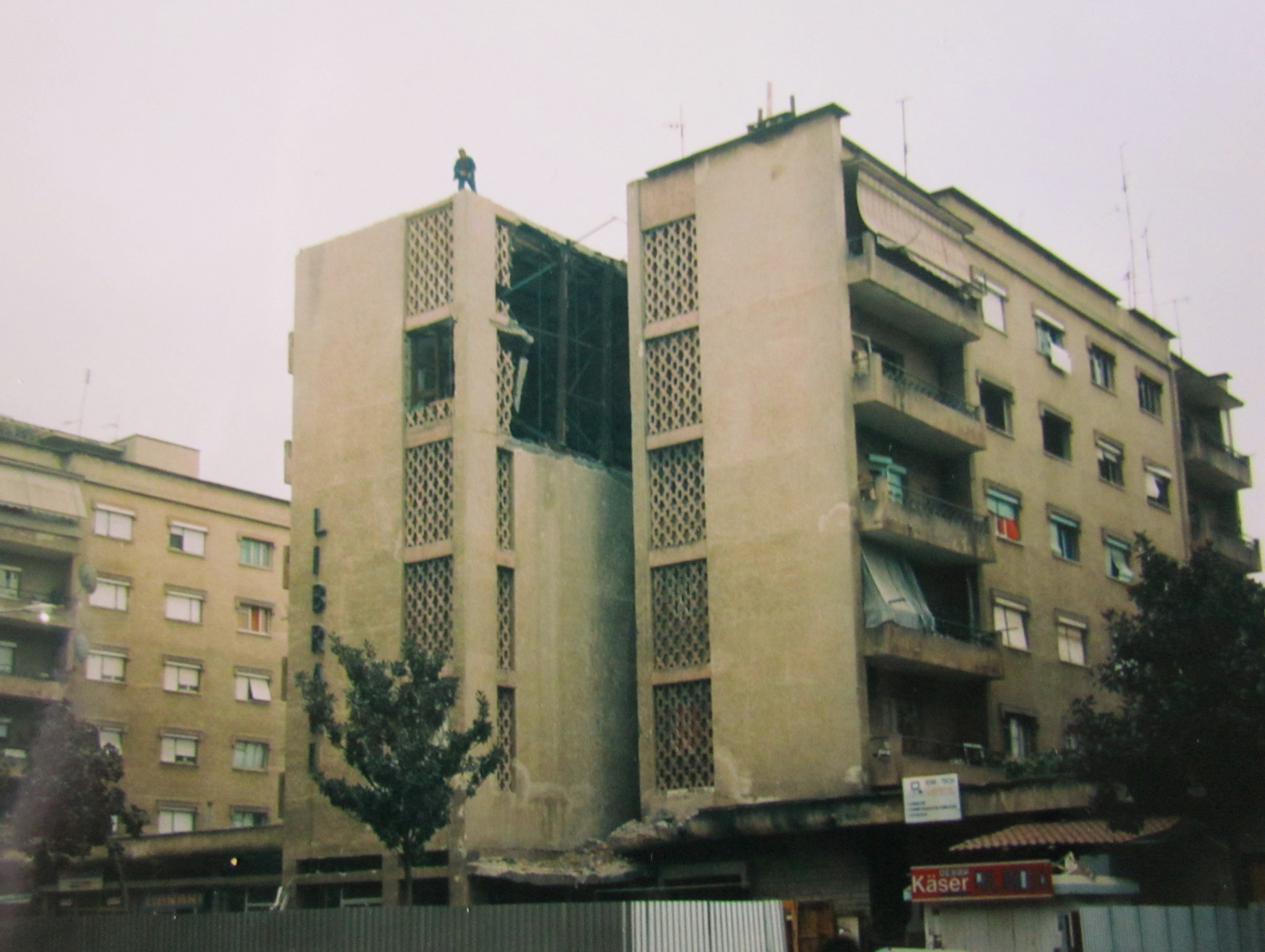
Appeals Court president's home and other apartments wrecked after a bomb attack

- July 11, 1996

Berisha forms a new enlarged (25-member) cabinet. Among the new ministers are Tritan Shehu as foreign minister and deputy premier, Ridvan Bode as finance minister, and Halit Shamata as interior minister. The government includes four female members, the widest female representation in the history of the country.

- November 5, 1996

The appeals court upholds prison sentences of up to 20 years on nine high-ranking officials of the communist era. They were sentenced on September 28 for putting thousands of dissidents into internal exile. Those charged included party leaders from Tirana, Lushnjë and other towns, as well as secret police and officials of the Interior Ministry.

- November 6, 1996

Shortly after midnight, in downtown Tirana an explosion takes place in the apartment of Prel Martini, chief judge of the appeals court. The bomb leaves his five-year-old daughter with a broken leg and injures Martini, his seven-year-old son and two women in neighbouring apartments. Prime Minister Aleksandër Meksi says the explosion is a politically motivated terrorist act.

== 1997 Civil unrest and aftermath ==
In the 1997 unrest in Albania the general elections of June 1997 brought the Socialists and their allies to power. President Berisha resigned from his post, and Socialists elected Rexhep Meidani as president of Albania. Albanian Socialist Party Chairman Fatos Nano was elected Prime Minister, a post which he held until October 1998, when he resigned as a result of the tense situation created in the country after the assassination of Azem Hajdari, a prominent leader of the Democratic Party. Pandeli Majko was then elected Prime Minister, and he served in this post until November 1999, when he was replaced by Ilir Meta. Albania approved its constitution through a popular referendum which was held in November 1998, but which was boycotted by the opposition. The general local elections of October 2000 marked the loss of control of the Democrats over the local governments and a victory for the Socialists.

- January 24–26, 1997

Following the collapse of several "get-rich-quick" pyramid schemes, in which hundreds of thousands of Albanians lost their life savings, enraged investors go on the rampage in the southern town of Lushnjë. Foreign Minister Shehu is attacked by demonstrators there on January 25. On January 26, thousands of people converge on central Tirana and clash with riot police. Government buildings are set ablaze in towns and cities across the country. In February unrest engulfs Vlorë, causing several deaths.

- March 1

Prime Minister Aleksandër Meksi resigns.

- March 2

A national state of emergency is declared. Rioters take control of the town of Sarandë, seizing weapons from police headquarters and army barracks. With astonishing speed the entire military establishment melts away, the security service dissolves, and the people arm themselves with every type of weapon, including Kalashnikovs and even tanks - an estimated 650,000 weapons are seized. Most of the southern half of the country falls into the hands of ragtag rebels and criminal gangs. More than 10,000 persons flee to Italy, which in turn causes a governmental crisis in Rome. Several high government officials, including Defense Minister Safet Zhulali, flee abroad.

- March 3

Despite widespread demands for his resignation, on President Berisha is re-elected virtually unopposed by Parliament (113-1 with 4 abstentions).

- March 6–8

Insurgents take control of Tepelenë, and on March 8 they seize Gjirokastër, the last southern government stronghold.

- March 11–16

Bashkim Fino of the opposition Socialist Party is appointed as prime minister. Arjan Starova becomes foreign minister; Shaqir Vukaj, defense minister; Arben Malaj, finance minister; Belul Celo, interior minister. Unrest spreads to northern Albania, and by March 13 engulfs all major population centres, including Tirana. Alia flees jail during the insurrection. Nano is pardoned by Berisha on March 16. Foreign countries begin to evacuate their nationals from the country, which is now in a state of anarchy. More than 360 people have been killed and 3,500 wounded in three months. The tragic events also cause the economy to suffer. Unemployment soars over the 25% mark, inflation rises, and gross domestic product, which registered 8-11% increases in the previous few years, drops by 7%. The currency is devalued from 108 to more than 150 leks to the US dollar.

- March 28, 1997

More than 80 people die when an Albanian refugee ship collides with an Italian ship in the Adriatic Sea.

- Late March 1997

The UN Security Council approves dispatching a multinational military force to Albania to oversee the distribution of international humanitarian aid and maintain order.

- April 9, 1997

The Socialists end their boycott of parliament and take up their seats.

- April 12, 1997

The pretender to the throne, Leka I, returns to Albania and calls for a referendum on restoring the monarchy.

- April 15, 1997

The Italian-led international protection force begins arriving in Albania. Some 7,000 troops from eight European countries participate in "Operation Alba."

- May 16, 1997

Berisha calls new elections for June 29.

- June 2, 1997

A bomb attack injures 27 people in Tirana.

- June 4, 1997

A grenade is thrown at Berisha during a campaign rally outside Tirana but it is deactivated.

- June 29 and July 6, 1997

The Socialist Party wins parliamentary elections, with 100 seats out of 155. Their coalition allies win 17 seats, and Berisha's Democratic Party 27. Turnout in the first round is about 65%. In a referendum held at the same time, about one-third of voters support the restoration of the monarchy. The Socialists say Albania will be a parliamentary republic, with executive power concentrated in the hands of the prime minister rather than the president.

- July 3, 1997

Interior Minister Belul Celo resigns.

- July 7, 1997

Tritan Shehu resigns as Democratic Party chairman.

- July 23, 1997

President Berisha resigns.

- July 24

Parliament elects secretary of the Socialist Party of Albania and former physics professor Rexhep Meidani as President of Albania (110-3 with 2 abstentions). Meidani then accepts the resignation of Prime Minister Fino, and names Socialist Party leader Nano as new Prime minister of Albania.

- July 25

A new 20-member multiparty cabinet (excluding the Democratic Party) is presented by Nano, including Paskal Milo as foreign minister, Sabit Brokaj as defense minister, Neritan Ceka as interior minister, and Arben Malaj retaining his post of finance minister.

- September 18, 1997

The Democrats leave parliament when one of their deputies, Azem Hajdari, is shot and wounded by a Socialist inside the chamber.

- October 21, 1997

Berisha is elected chairman of the Democratic Party.

- December 23, 1997

Alia, who escaped from jail in March and left the country, returns from abroad. He, two ex-interior ministers - Hekuran Isai (1982–89, 1990–91) and Simon Stefani (1989–90) - and the ex-chief prosecutor were acquitted on October 20 of killing 58 people who attempted to flee the country illegally between 1990 and 1992. Prosecutors dropped the charges following a supreme court ruling that 32 other senior ex-communists could not be held liable for alleged offenses which had not been a crime at the time.

== 1998 ==
- Mid-April 1998

Following widespread allegations of government inefficiency and corruption in his administration, Nano reshuffles his cabinet, reducing the number of ministers.

- May–July

More than 13,000 refugees flee into Albania after the eruption in February of civil war between the Serbian police and army and the ethnic Albanian separatist Kosovo Liberation Army (KLA) in the neighbouring province of Kosovo. The Albanian Foreign Ministry repeatedly charges Yugoslavia with border violations that include shelling and sniping and with conducting massacres of Kosovo's civilian population. It also calls for NATO military intervention to stop the fighting.

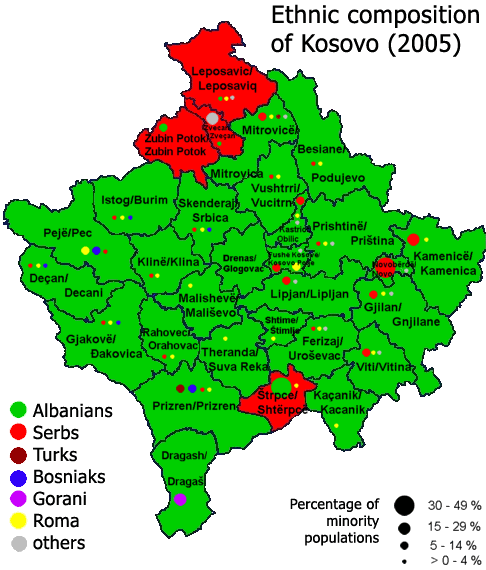
Ethnic Albanians in Kosovo

- June 21 and 28

Local by-elections confirm continuing popular support for Nano's coalition, which wins in five municipalities and six smaller communities. The opposition wins in two municipalities and three communities.

- Late August

Police arrest former defense minister Safet Zhulali, former interior minister Halit Shamata, former chairman of state control Blerim Cela, and three other former officials of Berisha's government on charges of crimes against humanity in conjunction with their alleged roles in the suppression of unrest in 1997. General Prosecutor Arben Rakipi charges the six with having ordered the use of chemical weapons, airplanes, and helicopters against civilians. Subsequently, Berisha calls on his supporters to bring down the government "with all means," saying that the arrests were politically motivated.

- September 12

Azem Hajdari, a senior leader of the Democratic Party, is shot dead by a gunman as he steps out of the party's office in Tirana; on September 13 Democratic Party supporters storm and set fire to the prime minister's office in a protest against the killing. Government forces counterattack and reoccupy the buildings, and on September 15 Berisha surrenders two tanks posted outside his headquarters after the government threatened to use force if his followers did not give up their weapons.

- September 18

Albania's parliament lifts the immunity from prosecution of opposition leader Berisha, clearing the way for prosecutors to charge him with attempting a coup.

- September 21

Ahmet Krasniqi, leading member of the self-styled ethnic Albanian government in Kosovo, is shot dead in Albania.

- September 28

Prime Minister Nano resigns after failing to get the backing of his coalition for a cabinet reshuffle in the wake of the outbreak of political violence two weeks ago. Pandeli Majko is named to succeed him.

- October 2

Pandeli Majko, 30, becomes Europe's youngest head of government after being sworn in as Albanian prime minister. Petro Koçi becomes interior minister and Anastas Angjeli finance minister. On October 8 the new government wins a parliamentary confidence vote (104-0; the opposition Democratic Party is boycotting Parliament).

- October 21

Albania's parliament votes in favour of a draft constitution and agrees to put it to a referendum. This is held on November 22, and 93.5% of the voters support the new constitution. Turnout is 50.6%. President Meidani signs the constitution into law on November 28, Albania's independence day. The new constitution, which replaces a package of laws introduced after the collapse of communism, provides for the separation of powers, rule of law, and the independence of the judiciary. It also guarantees human rights and the protection of minorities. The opposition Democratic Party, which (ignoring calls by the Organization for Security and Cooperation in Europe and the Council of Europe) boycotted the referendum and the parliamentary commission which drafted the constitution, says the results were fixed and that it can not recognize the new constitution.

== 1999 ==
- March–June 1999

During the 78 days of NATO bombing of Yugoslavia, about 450,000 of a total 750,000 Kosovar refugees flee into Albania. That figure is equal to almost 15% of Albania's total population. The hostilities turn Albania into a key operational theatre for international relief agencies and NATO forces in Albania, called Kosovo Force (KFOR), which launch a humanitarian relief operation. In addition, within the framework of the NATO air campaign, U.S. forces deploy 24 Apache antitank helicopters and long-range artillery pieces in northern Albania. The northern Albanian border regions of Kukës and Tropojë bear the brunt of the refugee influx and military operations. Supplying the refugees and transporting them to other parts of the country creates immense logistic difficulties for the United Nations High Commissioner for Refugees and other relief agencies. The region also sees ongoing border clashes between Yugoslav forces, who continually shell Albanian border villages, and Kosovo Liberation Army (KLA) fighters operating in part from support bases inside Albania. The border area remains heavily mined after the fighting subsides. With the end of the fighting, Albania's relations improve with its neighbours - Montenegro, Macedonia, Greece, and the new UN administration in Kosovo, with whom the Albanian Foreign Ministry plans a series of joint regional development projects within the framework of the European Union-funded Stability Pact for South Eastern Europe. Early accomplishments include the installation of a powerful microwave-telephone connection between Albania and Kosovo and the signing of infrastructure development projects with Montenegro.

- May 20, 1999

NATO says it will supply long-term military aid to Albania and Macedonia and draw up plans to help the two Balkan countries meet the alliance's entry requirements.

- May 20, 1999

Spartak Poçi is appointed interior minister, replacing Petro Koçi. Poçi subsequently manages to break up 12 criminal gangs throughout the country, most notably those in Tropojë, where special police units restore order in September. Because of frequent armed robberies, Tropojë earlier had been a "no-go" area for international aid agencies. The Organization for Security and Cooperation in Europe closed its office there on June 16 after gunmen killed two of its local staff.

- July 17, 1999

At an extraordinary party congress in Tirana, PDS leader Sali Berisha declares that the party ends its boycott of parliament as a gesture of gratitude to the U.S. for its engagement on behalf of the Kosovars. So far the PDS has been strongly under the control of Berisha, but late in the year the reformists in the PDS openly clash with Berisha's supporters over party strategy. The reformers argue that the parliamentary boycott was leading to political isolation of the party.

- September 15, 1999

Nano accuses Majko of having allowed Kosovar guerrillas to smuggle arms through Albanian territory.

- October 25, 1999

Prime Minister Majko resigns after losing the leadership of the ruling Socialist Party earlier in the month to Fatos Nano. On October 27 President Meidani asks Ilir Meta to form the next government. He is sworn in October 29.

- November 11, 1999

The most significant success in administrative reform comes with the passage of a new law on the civil service, designed to stop the practice of political appointments and to increase the independence and integrity of career civil servants. Implementation of the law and the creation of a workable institutional framework occupy much of the following year.

== 2000 ==
- February 2000

It is reported that the government has shifted its attention away from the construction of the east–west trunk road "Corridor 8," designed to link the South Balkans to the Adriatic, and is instead focusing on an internal north–south highway.

- March 2000

Stability Pact for South Eastern Europe members

A "quick start" package is launched within the Stability Pact for South Eastern Europe, the 28-nation agreement signed in 1999 to restore peace, stability, and prosperity to the region. Albania receives about €112 million (about $109 million) for the rehabilitation of roads, railroads, harbours, power and water lines, and the airport in Tirana. The Stability Pact earmarks an additional €320 million (about $311 million) for near-term infrastructure projects to be implemented subsequently. The Stability Pact also dominates Albania's foreign-policy agenda. Numerous projects designed to enhance cooperation between Albania and other southeastern European countries in the fields of human rights, democracy, and security are launched.

- May 14, 2000

Opposition leader Sali Berisha leads 4,000 protestors in the southern port of Vlorë in the first anti-government rally led by the controversial former president.

- May 24, 2000

President Meidani travels to Kosovo, the first visit ever by an Albanian head of state to that heavily ethnic Albanian-populated province in Yugoslavia. Meidani emphasizes Albania's commitment to the creation of "a Europe of the regions" (that is, rather than a continent based on traditional nation-states) and speaks against the desirability of creating a "Greater Albania" that would include ethnic Albanians in neighbouring countries, while stressing the need for closer regional and European integration.

- June 14, 2000

Berisha is barred from entering the Albanian-dominated Yugoslav province of Kosovo by the UN peacekeeping force, which deems him a threat to public order.

- July 7, 2000

In a cabinet reshuffle, Ilir Gjoni replaces Luan Hajdaraga as defense minister.

- September 18, 2000

EU foreign ministers include Albania in a list of Balkan countries offered duty-free access for 95% of their exports. The list does not include neighbouring Serbia and comes as part of a package of measures designed to encourage voters there to embrace reform and oust their federal president, Slobodan Milosevic.

- October 1 and 15, 2000

The ruling Socialist Party of Albania emerges as the clear winner of municipal elections, taking 50 municipalities and 218 communities - including the mayoralty of Tirana for the first time since 1992 - although the Democratic Party throughout the year focused attention on rallying support for its candidates, accusing the governing Alliance for the State coalition of corruption and smuggling, charges that the coalition dismissed. The Democrats win only in 11 municipalities and 80 communities after calling for a partial boycott of the vote in the runoff. Two municipalities and 17 communities go to smaller parties and independent candidates.

- October 2000

Following the election of Vojislav Koštunica as president of Yugoslavia, Albanian Foreign Minister Paskal Milo makes the resumption of regular bilateral relations dependent on Serbia freeing Kosovo Albanian prisoners and recognizing its responsibility for crimes against humanity in the Kosovo war.

== 2001 ==
Growth in gross domestic product is 7.3%, just slightly less than the 7.8% registered in 2000. Unemployment drops from 17.1% in 1999 to 13.3% in 2001, thanks to a government-supported job creation program that includes infrastructure-development projects within the framework of the Stability Pact for South Eastern Europe.

Although Albania has made strides toward democratic reform and maintaining the rule of law, serious deficiencies in the electoral code remain to be addressed, as demonstrated in the June 2001 parliamentary elections. International observers judged the 2001 elections to be acceptable, but the Union for Victory Coalition, the second-largest vote recipient, disputed the results and boycotted parliament until January 31, 2002. The Socialists re-elected Ilir Meta as Prime Minister in August 2001, a post which he held till February 2002, when he resigned due to party infighting. Pandeli Majko was re-elected Prime Minister in February 2002.

- March 2001

The large ethnic Albanian minority in neighbouring Macedonia stages an armed rebellion. Although Albania's prime minister Ilir Meta supports international peace negotiations (which lead to a truce and a peace settlement in late August), there is evidence to suggest that Albanian border guards have at first failed to seal the border completely to arms smugglers supplying the rebels in Macedonia.

- Mid-April 2001

The government is strongly criticized for its unsuccessful policy toward human trafficking. The International Organization for Migration (IOM) joins Save the Children in highlighting the trade in eastern European women and even Albanian children, and accuses local Albanian police of colluding in the lucrative industry. IOM points out that there have been fewer prosecutions of smugglers than of victims of the trade.

- April 18, 2001

The government announces that legislative elections will take place on June 24.

- June 24, 2001

In the first round of the parliamentary elections (turnout 54.9%), the ruling Socialist Party, with a reform-oriented program, wins 31 seats; the opposition Union for Victory coalition, formed by the Democratic Party, receives 16 seats. In the second round on July 8, the Socialist Party wins another 44 and the Union for Victory 30. The opposition had been split since 2000, when the New Democrat Party was formed, whose leader, Genc Pollo, charged Berisha with failing to offer convincing answers to the country's essential problems. Pollo's leadership appealed to many voters who were looking for a group among the opposition that could demonstrate some political competence. The new party wins six seats in the new parliament.

- July 30, 2001

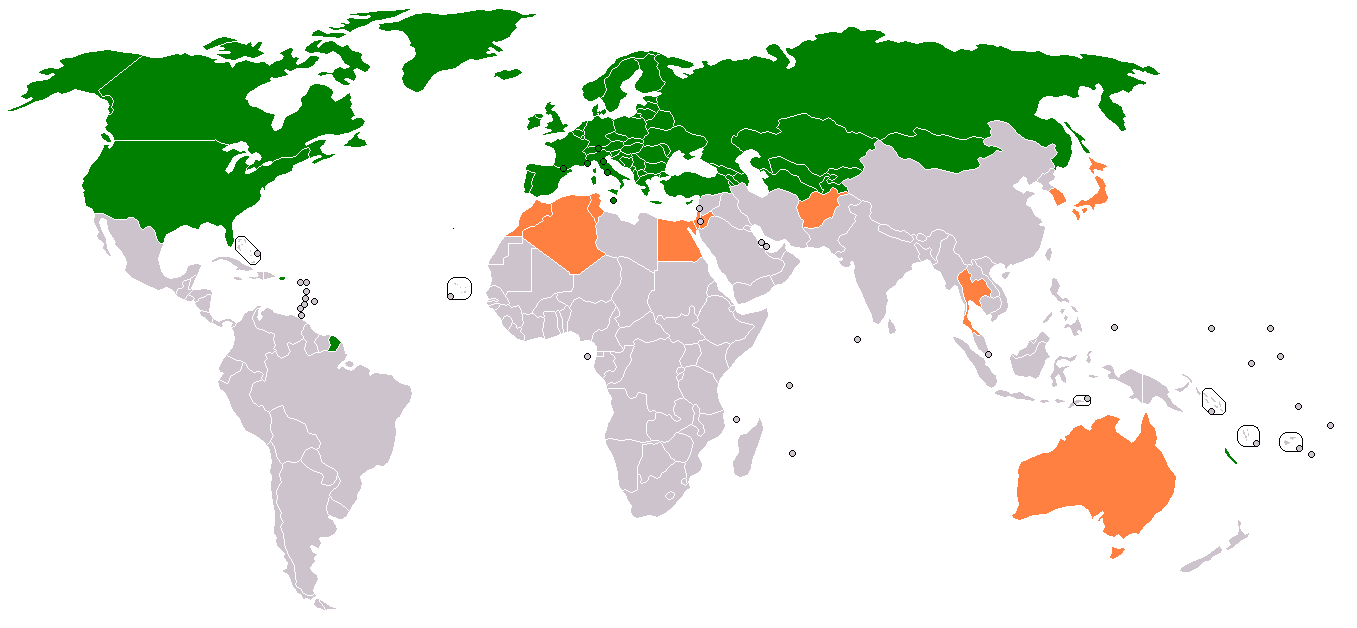
OSCE members and partners

The opposition Democratic Party (PDS) announces that it will not accept the results of the "farcical" legislative election and that it will consequently stay away from the People's Assembly. According to final results announced on August 21 the ruling Socialist Party won a clear majority of 73 seats in the 140-seat Assembly, while the Union for Victory won only 46. Observers from the Organization for Security and Cooperation in Europe disagree with the PDS and describe the poll as free and fair.

- September 3, 2001

The Democratic Party boycotts the opening session of the People's Assembly in defiance of the government's recent electoral victory.

- September 12, 2001

Parliament gives Prime Minister Ilir Meta's new government a vote of confidence. Within the governing coalition the Socialist Party controls all key ministries. Arta Dade becomes foreign minister (the first woman in Albanian history to hold that post), Ilir Gjoni interior minister, and Pandeli Majko defense minister; Anastas Angjeli remains finance minister. The chairman of the Social Democratic Party, Skënder Gjinushi, takes charge of labour and social affairs, while another Social Democrat, former foreign minister Paskal Milo, becomes minister of Euro-Atlantic integration. Former justice minister Arben Imami becomes minister of local government and decentralization, pledging to focus on strengthening the role of cities and towns; Niko Kacalidha (of the Union Party, which represents many ethnic Greeks) is appointed to the new post of state minister for minorities and the diaspora. For his part, Prime Minister Meta pledges to upgrade power supplies, proceed with privatization, fight corruption and organized crime, improve ties with Western Europe and neighbours in the Balkan region, and promote free trade.

- Early December 2001

Five cabinet members resign after a concerted campaign by Fatos Nano, the leader of the ruling Socialist Party, to bring about a reshuffle. Nano has accused the government of high-level corruption.

== 2002 ==
- Albania is working to conclude free-trade agreements with Macedonia, Yugoslavia, Bosnia and Hercegovina, and Croatia.

The economy suffers a slight setback. Unemployment creeps up during the year. A United Nations Development Project report estimates that one-third of the population lives in poverty, earning less than $1 per capita per day. Large segments of the population live from subsistence agriculture and do not receive unemployment benefits.

- January 29, 2002

Prime Minister of Albania Ilir Meta resigns in anger over a continuing row with the leader of his Socialist Party, Fatos Nano, who has been resisting the appointment of ministers to vacant cabinet positions. Earlier that day the opposition Democratic Party ended its four-month boycott of the People's Assembly.

- February 7, 2002

Defense Minister Pandeli Majko receives the backing of the various warring factions within the ruling Socialist Party to be the country's next prime minister. Nominated by outgoing premier Meta, Majko agrees to accommodate supporters of party leader Nano in a new cabinet. The previous deadlock led the International Monetary Fund (IMF) and the World Bank to freeze aid payments until the situation was resolved. On February 16 President Meidani accepts Majko's proposed cabinet, including Kastriot Islami as finance minister, Luan Rama as defense minister, and Stefan Çipa as interior minister; Arta Dade is to remain as foreign minister. The cabinet is approved by Parliament on February 22.

- June 24, 2002

Parliament elects Alfred Moisiu as president (97-19). He is sworn in July 24. On July 25 Prime Minister Majko resigns. On July 31 Parliament approves (81-48) a new government with Socialist Party Chairman Fatos Nano as prime minister, Majko as defense minister, Ilir Meta as foreign minister, and Luan Rama as interior minister; Kastriot Islami remains finance minister. Nano's appointment marks the end of a power struggle between the party leader and his two younger challengers Meta and Majko, both of whom had served as prime minister since Nano resigned the post during a period of civil unrest in 1998. Media analysis suggests that Nano elbowed Meta and Majko aside in a grab for power after realizing that he was too controversial a figure to aspire to the presidency. The European Parliament had urged Albanian legislators to elect a president who would be acceptable to both the governing coalition and the opposition. Moreover, Meta and the outgoing president, Meidani, both openly opposed Nano's candidacy for the presidency. The election of Moisiu essentially sealed the Socialist legislators' compromise with the opposition led by the Democratic Party. Nano and Berisha say that the deal signals that the two rival party leaders have put years of fighting behind them. Moisiu, a 73-year-old retired general, served as president of the Albanian North Atlantic Treaty Association and is considered friendly by the opposition.

- August 29, 2002

The Organization for Security and Cooperation in Europe's chief of mission, Geert-Hinrich Ahrens, praises Albania in his end-of-mission address to the OSCE Permanent Council, reporting that the country is "in the forefront of reform in the region" and adding that recent achievements have "brought Albania to the threshold of opening negotiations for a Stabilization and Association Agreement with the European Union." Finnish diplomat Osmo Lipponen succeeds Ahrens on September 1.

== 2003 ==
- February 12–13, 2003

Albania opens negotiations with the European Commission on a Stabilization and Association Agreement, the first step towards membership of the European Union.

- May 2, 2003

U.S. Secretary of State Colin Powell signs a partnership agreement with Albania, Macedonia, and Croatia intended to help them achieve NATO membership.

- July 18, 2003

Angered by Nano's comments during a cabinet meeting, Foreign Minister Meta resigns in protest at Nano's "nihilistic, tendentious, and denigrating" criticism. On July 22 Marko Bello is nominated to be foreign minister, but he is rejected by parliament on July 28. On July 29 Luan Hajdaraga is named acting foreign minister.

- October 12, 2003

The Socialist Party wins a narrow victory over the Democratic Party in local elections. Turnout is around 50%.

- October 17, 2003

Interior Minister Luan Rama is sacked. He has been accused of punching the editor-in-chief of Vizion Plus television, Ilir Babaramo, in a Tirana restaurant on October 14 because of criticism broadcast by the TV station two months ago. On October 23 Prime Minister Nano's nominees for foreign minister, Namik Dokle, and for interior minister, Fatmir Xhafa, are rejected by parliament. On October 25 Nano picks Igli Toska to be acting interior minister.

- October 19, 2003

In Tiran, more than 2,000 people hold a "people's marathon" to celebrate the beatification of Mother Teresa, who was born to Albanian parents in what is now the Republic of Macedonia.

- December 29, 2003

Parliament finally approves new ministers for the vacant posts. Kastriot Islami becomes foreign minister, Arben Malaj succeeds him as finance minister, and Igli Toska becomes interior minister.

== 2004 ==
- January - A national day of mourning is called after 20 people dies in a shipwreckage during an illegal attempt to cross the Adriatic Sea and reach Italy.
- February 7, 2004 - Some 2,000 protesters gather at Prime Minister Nano's office. Stones are thrown and an attempt to storm the building is repelled by guards. Earlier in the day over 4,000 demonstrators rallied in Tirana's central square and, led by Democratic Party leader Berisha, called for Nano to quit.

== 2005 ==
- July 3 - Parliamentary elections end with a victory for the opposition Democratic Party (PD) and its allies, prominently the Republican Party (PR). Former president Sali Berisha became prime minister as a result of the election.
- September - After two months of political wrangling, former president Sali Berisha emerges as the victor in July's general election

== 2006 ==
- April - Speedboats are banned in coastal waters, in order to fight people and drug smuggling
- June - A Stabilisation and Association Agreement is signed between Albania and the European Union

== 2007 ==
Despite the political situation, the economy of Albania grew at an estimated 5% in 2007. The Albanian lek has strengthened from 143 lekë to the US dollar in 2000 to 92 lekë in 2007, mainly due to the depreciation of the US dollar, but also thanks to the overall improvement of the Albanian economy.

- June 10, 2007

US President George W. Bush visited Albania, the first sitting US president to do so. *July - Bamir Topi, ruling party chairmanpresident, is elected by the Parliament as President of Albania, after three failed round highlighted the risk of snap elections.

== 2008 ==
- March 15 – An explosion in a badly-maintained arms depot causes 16 deaths and over 300 injured, damaging Tirana airport. Defense minister Fatmir Mediu resigns.
- June 12 – Opposition Socialist Party leaves the Parliament, accusing the ruling Democratic Party of postponing voting on five new members of the Supreme Court awaiting appointment by President Bamir Topi.

== 2009 and the subsequent political gridlock ==
Albania joined NATO along with Croatia in April 2009, becoming the organization's 27th and 28th members. Albania also submitted the official application for membership into the European Union on April 28.

In July Sali Berisha's centre-right Democratic Party won the 2009 parliamentary elections by a narrow margin. The election was contested under a new regional Party-list proportional representation system, which had been approved only six months prior to the election. Berisha's alliance won enough seats to form a government, though it fell one seat short of a majority during the elections of June 28, 2009, having to join forces with a splinter socialist party, the Socialist Movement for Integration of Ilir Meta, whom Berisha appointed to the posts of Deputy Prime Minister and Minister for Foreign Affairs, and later Minister of Economy, Trade and Energy. It is the first time since the start of multi-party democracy in 1991 that a ruling party has been forced into a coalition through not winning enough seats on its own. The close campaign and close result of the elections, coupled with some irregularities in the process prompted the Socialists to accuse the governing Democrats of trying to sway the institutions and public opinion in their favour in order to form a new government. The Socialists warned that they would organize protests. Gramoz Ruci, a leading Socialist politician declared that unless Prime Minister Berisha abandons the idea of imposing himself he would "meet and face the people in the street."

In November protests begun in Tirana, led by opposition Socialist Party leader Edi Rama, against the allegedly rigged vote counting in the 2009 elections. Berisha had refused any recount of the votes, on the ground that the Albanian Constitution does not foresee such procedure. The political crisis between government and opposition worsened over time, with the Socialists abandoning parliamentary debates for months and staging hungerstrikes to ask for internal and international support.

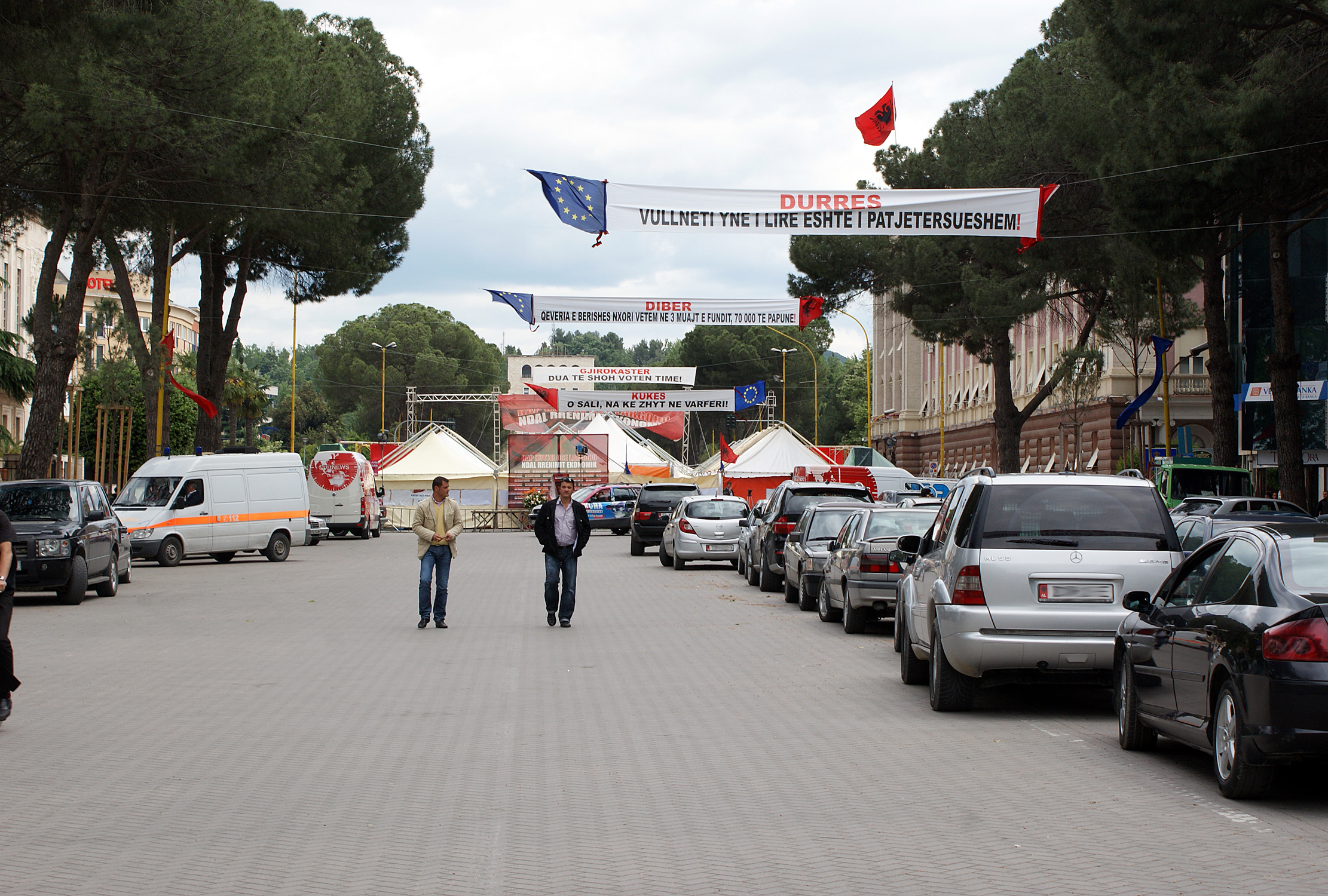
May 2010 hunger strike in central Tirana

In May 2010 the Socialist Party started a new civil disobedience campaign against the government, asking for a new count of votes. The campaign included another hunger strike of opposition leaders. The prime minister, Sali Berisha and opposition leader Edi Rama met in Strasbourg alongside representatives of the European Parliament in a business dinner to try and resolve their differences. The meeting produced no results. Meanwhile, the European Union started to threaten Albania with a freeze of its candidate status for joining the union if a compromise was not reached.

In September, Economy Minister Dritan Prifti resigned after being involved in a corruption scandal.

On October 28 the opposition Socialist Party walked out of the Parliament again.

In November the European Union rejected Albania's request for EU candidate status keeping true to its previous warnings, but the visa regime was liberalized for Albania and Bosnia. The ongoing political crisis was one of the reasons of the refusal of granting Albania official candidate status.

In 2011 the crisis kept intensifying. On January 7, the Central Election Commission of Albania begun burning the ballots of the 2009 parliamentary elections, in a routine process leading up to the May 8 local elections. This made a second count (repeatedly requested by the opposition) impossible. The Socialist Party accused the CEC and the Berisha government of attempting to hide vote manipulation.

On January 14 Economy and Trade Minister and Deputy Prime Minister Ilir Meta resigns after being involved in a corruption scandal. Meta appeared on video footage, allegedly released by former Minister of Economy and Trade Dritan Prifti. In the video Meta appeared to be pressing Prifti to grant a public tender for a hydroelectrical power plant to one of his friends.

Because of the released footage on January 21,Clashes break up between police and protesters in an anti-government rally in front of the Government building in Tirana. Three people were shot dead on the spot and another died after a week-long coma in the most dramatic escalation of the political crisis. The EU issued a statement to all Albanian politicians, warning both sides to refrain from violence. Both sides however engaged in mutual recriminations. Berisha declared the demonstrations had actually been part of an alleged failed coup d'état and set out looking for witnesses. The opposition meanwhile declared that the violence exercised by the government forces had been unjustifiable.

On May 8, Local elections ended with the victory of the Socialist Party of Albania (PS) in the main cities outside Tirana, Lezha and Shkodra; The Organization for Security and Co-operation in Europe released a mixed evaluation of the electoral process, which was considered "competitive and transparent, but took place in an environment of high polarization and mistrust". In Tirana, the contest was between Edi Rama, incumbent mayor and PS leader, and Lulzim Basha, DP Minister of the Interior. After a long process of vote counting, Rama was first declared winner with a tight margin of 10 votes. Then, the DP-led Central Electoral Commission decided to add to the count some of the votes misplaced in the wrong boxes, a move on doubtful legal grounds that was contested by the opposition as well as by the OSCE. Basha was finally declared to be the winner with 83 votes. The EU Commission president José Manuel Barroso consequently cancelled his visit to Tirana;

== See also ==
- History of Albania
- Timeline of Albanian history

== Bibliography ==
- Afrim Krasniqi: The End of Albania's Siberia. Tirana 1998.
- Afrim Krasniqi: Civil Society in Albania. Tirana 2004.ISBN 99927-946-6-6
- Afrim Krasniqi: Political Parties in Albania 1920–2006.Tirana 2006.ISBN 99943-861-1-5
