= Timeline of Albanian history =

This is a timeline of Albanian history, comprising important legal and territorial changes and political events in Albania and its predecessor states. To read about the background to these events, see History of Albania. See also the list of Albanian monarchs and list of heads of state of Albania.

== 4th century BC to 12th century ==
Year	Date	Event
385 BC		Illyrian invasion of Epirus takes place under the rule of king Bardylis.
358 BC		Philip II of Macedon destroys the forces of king Bardylis at the Battle of Erigon Valley
335 BC		Alexander the Great participates in the Siege of Pelium and takes Tsangon Pass from king Cleitus (son of Bardylis) afterwards, the Illyrians swear loyalty to Alexander and join his army.
250-231 BC		Illyrian Kingdom at it's height as a military power under king Agron of Illyria.
229-228 BC		Roman Republic declares war on Illyrian kingdom. Queen Teuta loses a part of the southern territory of her kingdom and Illyria becomes a vassal state under Rome.
168 BC		King Gentius and his forces are defeated at Scodra by Romans. Illyrian Kingdom cease to exist and gets annexed by Rome.
146 BC		Province of Macedonia (Roman province) is established by Romans, which included majority of modern day Albania.
48 BC		Julius Caesar and his legions get defeated by Pompey during Battle of Dyrrhachium (48 BC).
150 AD		Ptolemy's map shows the city of Albanopolis (located northeast of Durrës). Ptolemy also mentions the Illyrian tribe named Albanoi, who lived around this city. The area was part of the Roman province of Macedonia.
244-311 AD		Epirus Nova or New Epirus or Illyria Graeca or Illyris proper was a province of the Roman Empire established by Diocletian during his restructuring of provincial boundaries. The province, belonged to the Roman province of Macedonia. Later it became a theme of the Byzantine Empire. Dyrrachium was established as the capital of Epirus nova. The Roman administrative region of Epirus Nova corresponded to southern Illyria, which was in part subject to ancient Greek influence.
400-500 AD		Around this period Fortress of Krujë was built.
1000-1018		The Arbanasi people are recorded as being 'half-believers' (non-Orthodox Christians) and speaking their own language in the Fragment of Origins of Nations between 1000 and 1018 by an anonymous author in a Bulgarian text of the 11th century.
1043		In History written in 1079–1080, Byzantine historian Michael Attaliates referred to the Albanoi as having taken part in a revolt against Constantinople in 1043 and to the Arbanitai as subjects of the duke of Dyrrachium. It is disputed, however, whether the "Albanoi" of the events of 1043 refers to Albanians in an ethnic sense or whether "Albanoi" is a reference to Normans from Sicily under an archaic name (there was also tribe of Italy by the name of "Albanoi"). However a later reference to Albanians from the same Attaliates, regarding the participation of Albanians in a rebellion in 1078, is undisputed.
1089		Dhuvjan Monastery is built in Gjirokastër.
1081–1118		Arbanitai of Arbanon are recorded in an account by Anna Comnena of the troubles in that region during the reign of her father Alexius I Comnenus by the Normans.
1190		The Principality of Arbanon was created.
1200		Local Albanian noble families began to emerge and Serbia occupies parts of northern Albania.

== 13th century ==
Year	Date	Event
1204		Fourth Crusade: Venice won control over most of Albania.
1204		Fourth Crusade: The Byzantines regained control of the southern portion of Albania and established the Despotate of Epirus.
1216		Principality of Arbanon loses it's autonomy when Michael I Komnenos Doukas invades Albania and Macedonia.
1258		The Angevin Kingdom of Sicily seized the Albanian coast and much of the Epirus hinterland.
1266		Battle of Benevento in Italy takes place. Charles I of Anjou defeats Manfred, King of Sicily and a year later he seizes Manfreds territory in Albania.
1272		Forces allied to Angevin Charles I of Naples occupied Durrës and established the Kingdom of Albania.
1279		Principality of Muzaka was formed under the rule of Andrea I Muzaka
1280		Siege of Berat (1280–1281): An Angevin offensive against Constantinople was repulsed by the Byzantines.
1282		Ardenica Monastery is built in Berat.
1284		Albanian language is mentioned for the first time in a witness testimony from the Republic of Ragusa.
1290		Albania began to come under Serbian attack.

== 14th century ==
Year	Date	Event
1304		The Angevins recaptured the Kingdom of Albania.
1358		Principality of Mataranga is founded by Blasius Mataranga
1359		Karl Thopia and his forces destroy the army Nikephoros II Orsini at the Battle of Achelous
1368		Karl Thopia captured Durrës from the Angevins.
1385		Thopia invited the Ottoman Empire to intervene against his rival Balsha II.
1387		Principality of Dukagjini is established after the Dukagjini family rebel against the Balšić noble family.
1389	June 15	Battle of Kosovo: Albanians, as part of a Serbian-led Balkan army, were crushed by Ottoman forces.

== 15th century ==
Year	Date	Event
1405		George Kastrioti, later Skanderbeg, was born.
1430		Gjon Kastrioti led an unsuccessful uprising against the Ottoman Empire.
1433		Gjergj Arianiti rebelled against the Ottoman Empire with some success.
1443		After being sent into battle near Niš, Skanderbeg entered Albania and embraced Roman Catholicism, marking the beginning of a long war against the Ottoman Empire.
1444		Skanderbeg was proclaimed chief of the League of Lezhë.
1450		The Albanians, led by Skanderbeg, routed Ottoman forces.
1462		Roman catholic archbishop Pal Engjëlli wrote the oldest indisputed known text in Albanian.
1466		The Albanians, led by Skanderbeg, began the defense of Krujë against massive Ottoman armies.
1467		The defense of Krujë ended.
1468	January 17	Skanderbeg died.
1478		Fourth Siege of Krujë (1478): Krujë fell to the Ottoman Empire, causing many Albanians to flee to southern Italy, Greece, Egypt, and elsewhere.
1479		Shkodër fell to the Ottoman Empire in Fourth siege of Shkodra the Albanians were helped by Venice but still lost.
1481		Albanian Rebellion of 1481–1484 takes place against the Ottoman Empire, but ends in defeat.
1485		Korçë is founded by Albanian military commander and governor Iljaz Bej Mirahori.
1497		Arnold Ritter von Harff's lexicon about the Albanian language is published.

== 16th century ==
Year	Date	Event
1555		Priest and author Gjon Buzuku who wrote the first known printed book in Albanian.

== 17th century ==
Year	Date	Event
1600		Some Albanians who converted to Islam found careers in the government and military services of the Ottoman Empire.
1600		A mass conversion of Albanians began which would see some two-thirds of them become Muslims.
1614		Tirana is founded by Albanian nobleman and general Sulejman Bargjini
1635		First Albanian dictionary is published by Albanian Catholic bishop and author Frang Bardhi.

== 18th century ==
Year	Date	Event
1730		First printing house founded by Gregory of Durrës
1750		Kokonozi Mosque is built in Tirana.
1757		Rise of Pashalik of Scutari, a semi-independent Albanian Pashalik under the command of the Bushati family.
1774		Rise of Pashalik of Berat, a semi-independent Albanian Pashalik under the command of Ahmet Kurt Pasha.
1785		Kara Mahmud Bushati, an Albanian noble from the Bushati family based in Shkodër, attacked Montenegrin territory and was named governor of Shkodër by Ottoman authorities.
1787		Rise of Pashalik of Yanina, a semi-independent state under the command of the Albanian Ali Pashë Tepelena.
1796		Kara Mahmud Bushati dies at the Battle of Krusi against Montengrin forces. His brother Ibrahim Bushati takes over.
1798		Siege of Butrint (1798) takes place. Ali Pashë Tepelena destroys the French forces and Pashalik of Yanina conquers Butrint from the French.
1798		Battle of Nicopolis (1798) takes place. Ali Pashë Tepelena destroys the French forces at Nicopolis and captures Preveza from the French.
1800		Most Albanian conversion to Islam came to an end.

== 19th century ==
Year	Date	Event
1803		Souliote War (1803) takes place, and ends with Ali Pashë Tepelena destroying the Souliote Confederacy.
1809		Ali Pashë Tepelena conquers the Pashalik of Berat.
1812		Gjirokastër Fortress was rebuilt and expanded under Ali Pashë Tepelena.
1821		Et'hem Bey Mosque is built.
1822		Albanian leader Ali Pashë Tepelena was assassinated by Ottoman agents for promoting an autonomous state.
1830		Five hundred Albanian leaders, accepting an invitation to meet with an Ottoman general in Monastir, were trapped and killed in an ambush.
1831		The end and dissolution of the semi-independent Pashalik of Scutari.
1835		The Ottoman Sublime Porte divided Albanian-populated lands into the Ottoman-administered vilayets of Janina and Rumelia.
1844		Naum Veqilharxhi publishes the Vithkuqi script.
1848		Albanians rose up against the Tanzimat reforms.
1861		The first school known to use the Albanian language in modern times opened in Shkodër.
1867		Shkodër Cathedral is built.
1877	April 24	Russo-Turkish War (1877–1878): The war began.
1877	December 18	Central Committee for Defending Albanian Rights is founded.
1878	March 3	Russo-Turkish War (1877–1878): The Ottoman Empire was defeated by its rival Russian Empire, seriously weakening Ottoman power over Albanian-populated areas.
1878	June 10	Albanian leaders meeting in Prizren formed the League of Prizren to advocate a unified Albania under Ottoman suzerainty.
1879	October 12	The Society for Printing of Albanian Writings, composed of Roman Catholic, Muslim, and Eastern Orthodox Albanians, was founded in Constantinople.
1881		Ottoman forces crushed Albanian resistance fighters at Prizren. The leaders of the League of Prizren and their families were arrested and deported.
1887	March 7	Mësonjëtorja the first secular Albanian language school opens.
1897		Ottoman authorities disbanded a reactivated League of Prizren.

== 20th century ==
Year	Date	Event
1906		Albanians began joining the Committee of Union and Progress in the hope of gaining autonomy for their nation within the Ottoman Empire.
1908		Albanian intellectuals meeting in Bitola chose the Latin alphabet as the standard script for the Albanian language.
1910	May	Albanian revolt of 1910 takes place in Kosovo vilayet. Albanian rebels under Isa Boletini attack Ottoman forces.
1911	April 6	Albanian Highlanders under Ded Gjo Luli defeated Ottoman forces in the town of Tuzi.
1912	May	Albanians rose against Ottoman authority and seized Skopje.
1912	October 8	First Balkan War: The war began, encouraging Albanian leaders to affirm the independence of their state.
1912	November	Muslim and Christian delegates declared Albania independent at Vlorë and established a provisional government.
1912	December	An ambassadorial conference in London gave half of Albanian territory to Serbia and Greece.
1913	May 30	First Balkan War: The Treaty of London ended the war.
1913	June 29	Second Balkan War: The war began.
1913	August 10	Second Balkan War: The Treaty of Bucharest ended the war and recognized an independent Albanian state ruled by a constitutional monarchy.
1914	February 21	William, Prince of Albania, of Wied was installed as head of the new Principality of Albania by the International Commission of Control.
1914	September	World War I: The new Albanian state collapsed.
1916		Austria-Hungary occupies Northen and Central Albania and it's administration lasts until 1918.
1918	November 11	World War I: The war ended with Albanian territory divided under Italian, Serbian, Greek and French military occupation.
1918	December	Albanian leaders met at Durrës to discuss presentation of Albanian interests at the upcoming Paris Peace Conference.
1919	January	Serbia attacked Albania, forcing Albanians to adopt guerrilla warfare.
1919	June	Paris Peace Conference, 1919: Albania was divided between Greece, Italy and Yugoslavia at the conference, which did not admit Albanian representation.
1920	January	Albanian leaders meeting at Lushnjë rejected the partition of Albania, warned that Albanians would take up arms in defense of their territory, and created a bicameral parliament.
1920	February	The Albanian government under Sulejman Delvina moved to the new capital Tirana.
1920	September	Albania forced Italy to withdraw its troops and abandon territorial claims to almost all Albanian territory.
1920	December	Albania was admitted to the League of Nations as a sovereign and independent state.
1921	November	The Yugoslavian army invaded the Albanian territories they had not previously occupied.
1921	November	A League of Nations commission forced a Yugoslavian withdrawal and reaffirmed the 1913 borders of Albania.
1921	December	The Popular Party headed by Xhafer Bej Ypi formed a government, with the future King Zog of Albania acting as internal affairs minister.
1922	August	Ecumenical Patriarch of Constantinople Patriarch Meletius IV of Constantinople recognized the Orthodox Autocephalous Church of Albania.
1922	September	Zog became Prime Minister.
1922	December	National Library of Albania is established.
1923		The Sunnis of Albania broke the last of their ties with the dissolving Ottoman Empire, pledging primary allegiance to their native country.
1924	March	Zog's party won elections to the National Assembly.
1924	March	Zog stepped down after a financial scandal and an assassination attempt.
1924	July	A peasant-backed insurgency won control of Tirana, installed Fan S. Noli as Prime Minister and forced Zog of Albania to flee to Yugoslavia.
1924	December	Zog, backed by the Yugoslavian army, returned to power and forced Noli to flee to Italy.
1925	May	Italy began to penetrate Albanian public and economic life.
1925	September	Bank of Albania is founded.
1926		Domestic air transport in Albania begins, German airline Adria Aero Lloyd was granted a monopoly over internal air routes and commenced services linking Tirana with Shkodër, Korçë, and Vlorë.
1926	November 27	Italy and Albania signed the First Treaty of Tirana, guaranteeing Albanian boundaries and the political position of Zog.
1928	August	Zog pressured the parliament to dissolve itself and called a constituent assembly which declared him King.
1928		Royal Albanian Army is established.
1931		Zog refused to renew the First Treaty of Tirana despite Italian political and economic pressure.
1934		Italy suspended economic support to Albania.
1935		Italian Prime Minister Benito Mussolini renewed economic aid to Albania.
1936		First hydroelectric plant in Albania, Vithkuq Hydroelectric Power Station is constructed.
1938		Radio Tirana begins broadcasting.
1939	March 17	The German ambassador assured Mussolini of German support for an Italian invasion of Albania.
1939	March 25	The Italian ambassador demanded that Albania become an Italian protectorate.
1939	April	The Albanian army mobilized.
1939	April 5	Leka, Crown Prince of Albania, the heir to the Albanian throne, was born.
1939	April 5	Zog appealed to the democracies.
1939	April 6	Zog appealed to the Balkan Pact.
1939	April 7	Italian invasion of Albania: Fifty thousand Italian marines landed in the ports of Durrës, Vlorë, Shëngjin and Sarandë. See also: Albania under Italy, Albania under Nazi Germany, Albanian resistance during World War II
1939	April 7	Zog fled with his wife, Queen Géraldine Apponyi de Nagyappony, and their infant son Leka, to Greece.
1939	April 8	Italian troops occupied Tirana.
1939	April 12	A constituent assembly summoned in Tirana by pro-Italian notables approved a personal union with Italy.
1939	April 12	Shefqet Bej Verlaci became Prime Minister and acting Head of State.
1939	April 14	Albania withdrew from the League of Nations.
1939	April 16	Italian King Victor Emmanuel III of Italy was crowned King of Albania.
1939	April 22	Francesco Jacomoni di San Savino was appointed the viceroy of Albania.
1940		The Albanian constitution was voided.
1940		The Albanian Fascist Party was established.
1940		The Albanian army was merged into the Italian army.
1940	October 28	Greco-Italian War: The war began. The Italian army invaded Greece through Albania.
1941	April	Invasion of Yugoslavia: Germany, Italy, Hungary, Bulgaria, Romania and the Croatian Ustaše invaded Yugoslavia.
1941	April	Battle of Greece: Germany invaded Greece.
1941	April	Axis occupation of Greece during World War II: Greece was partitioned between Germany, Italy and Bulgaria, with Italy occupying the bulk of the Greek mainland and most of the islands.
1941	October	Josip Broz Tito, leader of the Communist Party of Yugoslavia, began to organize Albanian Communists.
1941	November 8	The Albanian Communist Party was founded under First Secretary Enver Hoxha.
1941	December 3	Mustafa Merlika-Kruja became Prime Minister.
1942	September 16	Conference of Pezë: The National Liberation Movement (Albania) was established.
1942	October	Noncommunist nationalist groups appeared to resist Italian occupation.
1943	August	Italy signed the Armistice between Italy and Allied armed forces, dissolving much of its armed forces and loosening its hold over Albania.
1943	September	German forces invaded and occupied Albania. The Albanian Kingdom became a German puppet state.
1944	January	The National Liberation Movement, supplied with British weapons, gained control of southern Albania.
1944	May	The Communists met to organize an Albanian government and appointed Hoxha chairman of the executive committee and supreme commander of the National Liberation Movement.
1944	July	Communist forces enter central and northern Albania.
1944	October	The Communists established a provisional government with Enver Hoxha as Prime Minister.
1944	November	The Communists entered the capital in the wake of a German withdrawal.
1944	December	The Communist provisional government adopted laws allowing state regulation of commercial enterprises and foreign and domestic trade.
1945	January	The Communist provisional government agreed to restore Kosovo to Yugoslavia as an autonomous region.
1945	January	The government began to condemn thousands of "war criminals" and "enemies of the people" to death or to prison, and to nationalize industry, transportation, forests, and pastures.
1945	April	Yugoslavia recognized the government of Albania.
1945	August	Sweeping agricultural reforms began under which about half of arable land was eventually redistributed to peasants from large landowners and most church properties were nationalized.
1945	August	The United Nations Relief and Rehabilitation Administration began sending supplies to Albania.
1945	November	The Soviet Union recognized the Albanian provisional government.
1945	November	Britain and the United States made full diplomatic recognition of Albania conditional.
1945	December	Elections for the People's Assembly were held in which only candidates from the Democratic Front (Albania) were on ballot.
1946	January	The People's Assembly proclaimed the People's Republic of Albania, signalling the beginning of purges of noncommunists from positions of power.
1946	July	A treaty of friendship and cooperation was signed with Yugoslavia, marking the beginning of a flow of Yugoslavian advisers and grain into Albania.
1946	October 26	Corfu Channel Incident: Two British ships were destroyed by mines off the Albanian coast in the Straits of Corfu.
1946	November	Albania broke diplomatic relations with the United States.
1947		Corfu Channel Incident: United Nations Security Council Resolution 22 recommended that the International Court of Justice settle the dispute between the UK and Albania regarding the sinking of two British ships in the Straits of Corfu.
1947	April	The Economic Planning Commission first drew up an economic plan with production targets for mining, manufacturing and agricultural enterprises.
1947	May	Greek Civil War: A United Nations commission concluded that Albania, together with Bulgaria and Yugoslavia, supported Communist guerrillas.
1947	May	Yugoslavian leaders launched a verbal offensive against anti-Yugoslavian Albanian Communists, including Hoxha, empowering the pro-Yugoslavian faction.
1947	July	Albania refused to participate in the Marshall Plan of the United States.
1948	February	Albanian Communist Party leaders began voting to merge the Albanian and Yugoslavian economies and militaries.
1948	March	The measure to merge the Albanian and Yugoslavian economies and militaries passed.
1948	June	The Cominform expelled Yugoslavia, triggering the souring of Albanian relations with that country.
1948	September	Hoxha began purging high-ranking party members accused of Titoism.
1948	September	Albania abrogated its treaty of friendship with Yugoslavia.
1948	September	The Soviet Union began giving economic aid and sending advisers to Albania.
1948	November	The first Party Congress changed the name of the Communist Party to the Party of Labour of Albania.
1949	January	The regime issued a Decree on Religious Communities.
1949	February	Albania joined the Council for Mutual Economic Assistance (Comecon), a free trade area separate from the rest of the world.
1949	December	Albanian Communists thought to be supporters of Yugoslavian Prime Minister Tito were purged.
1950		Britain and the United States begin inserting unsuccessful anticommunist Albanian guerrilla units into Albania.
1950	July	A new constitution was approved by the People's Assembly, under which Hoxha became minister of defense and foreign minister.
1951	February	Albania and the Soviet Union signed an agreement on mutual economic assistance.
1954	July	Hoxha relinquished the post of Prime Minister to Mehmet Shehu but retained primary power as First Secretary of the Communist Party.
1955	May	Albania became a founding member of the Warsaw Pact.
1956	February	Communist Party of the Soviet Union chief Nikita Khrushchev delivered the speech "On the Personality Cult and its Consequences" in which he criticized his predecessor Joseph Stalin, and caused a chill in relations with Albania under the pro-Stalin Hoxha.
1957	May	University of Tirana is founded.
1959		Large amounts of economic aid from the Soviet Union, Eastern European countries and China began pouring into Albania.
1959	May	Khrushchev visited Albania.
1960	June	Soviet–Albanian split: Albania sided with the People's Republic of China, causing the Soviet Union to dramatically curtail economic support.
1960	November	Hoxha railed against Khrushchev and supported China during an international Communist conference in Moscow.
1961	February	Hoxha harangued against the Soviet Union and Yugoslavia at Albania's Fourth Party Congress.
1961	December	The Soviet Union broke diplomatic relations with Albania, spurring Eastern European Communist countries to severely reduce their Albanian contacts and Albania to improve its relationship with China.
1962		The Albanian regime introduced an austerity program in an attempt to compensate for the withdrawal of Soviet economic support.
1962		Albania became the spokesman for China at the UN.
1963	January	Chinese statesman and diplomat Zhou Enlai visits Albania.
1964	October	Khrushchev was forced to resign, to the delight of Hoxha.
1966	February	Hoxha initiated a Cultural and Ideological Revolution.
1966	March	The Albanian Communist Party issued an "open letter" establishing an egalitarian wage and job structure for all workers.
1967		The Hoxha regime began to conduct a violent campaign against religious life which would close or convert to other uses over two thousand religious buildings by the end of the year.
1968	August	Warsaw Pact invasion of Czechoslovakia: Albania condemned the invasion and withdrew from the Warsaw Pact.
1969		China's economic and military assistance to Albania was worth 9 Billion yuan at the time.
1972	November	The Albanian Orthography Congress takes place in Tirana.
1974		Elbasan steel mill is constructed, and was regarded as the biggest industrial output in Albania.
1976	September	Chinese Communist Party Chairman Mao Zedong died, leading eventually to a cooling of relations with Albania known as the Sino-Albanian split.
1976	December	A new constitution superseded the 1950 version and renamed Albania the Socialist People's Republic of Albania.
1977		Top military officials were purged after a "Chinese conspiracy" was uncovered.
1978	July	China terminated all economic and military aid to Albania.
1980		Hoxha selected Ramiz Alia as the next party head, bypassing Mehmet Shehu.
1981	October 28	National History Museum (Albania) opens.
1981	December	Shehu died, either by his own hand or on the orders of Hoxha.
1982	November	Alia became Chairman of the Presidium of the People's Assembly.
1983		Hoxha began his retirement, leaving more administrative power to Alia.
1985	April	Hoxha died.
1986	November	Alia was featured as the undisputed leader of the country and Party at the Ninth Party Congress.
1987	August	Greece ended the state of war.
1987	November	Albania and Greece signed a series of long-term agreements.
1988	October	Pyramid of Tirana opens.
1989	September	Alia, addressing the Eighth Plenum of the Central Committee, signalled that radical changes to the economic system were necessary.
1990	January	Demonstrations against the Ninth Plenum of the Central Committee at Shkodër forced authorities to declare state of emergency.
1990	April	Alia declared his willingness to establish diplomatic relations with the Soviet Union and the United States.
1990	May	Javier Pérez de Cuéllar, Secretary-General of the United Nations, visited Albania.
1990	May	The regime announced its desire to join the Organization for Security and Co-operation in Europe with the passage of laws liberalizing the criminal code, reforming the court system, lifting some restrictions on freedom of worship, and guaranteeing the right to travel abroad.
1990	July	Young people demonstrated against the regime in Tirana, causing five thousand citizens to seek refuge in foreign embassies.
1990	July	Albania and the Soviet Union signed a protocol normalizing relations.
1990	August	The government abandoned its monopoly on foreign commerce and began to open Albania to foreign trade.
1990	September	Alia addressed the United Nations General Assembly in New York City.
1990	October	Tirana hosted the Balkan Foreign Ministers' Conference.
1990	October	Ismail Kadare, Albania's most prominent writer, defected to France.
1990	December	Alia met with university students demonstrating against his dictatorship.
1990	December	The Thirteenth Plenum of the Central Committee of the Communist Party authorized a multiparty system.
1990	December	The opposition Democratic Party of Albania was established.
1990	December	A draft constitution was published.
1991	January	The opposition newspaper Rilindja Demokratike began publishing.
1991	January	Thousands of Albanians seek refuge in Greece.
1991	March	Albania and the United States reestablished diplomatic relations.
1991	March	Thousands of Albanians attempt to gain asylum in Italy.
1991	March	Multiparty elections were held.
1991	April	The elections came to a close. With 99 percent turnout the Communist Party won over 67 percent of vote for seats in the People's Assembly. The Albanian Democratic Party won about 30 percent.
1991	April	The People's Assembly reelected Ramiz Alia to a new presidential term.
1991	April	A reorganization replaced the Ministry of Internal Affairs with the Ministry of Public Order and placed the Frontier Guards and Directorate of Prison Administration under the Ministry of Defense and the Ministry of Justice, respectively.
1991	April	The People's Assembly passed a Law on Major Constitutional Provisions providing for fundamental human rights and separation of powers, invalidating the 1976 constitution.
1991	April	The People's Assembly appointed a commission to draft a new constitution.
1991	June	Prime Minister Fatos Nano and his cabinet resigned in the face of trade unions call for general strike.
1991	June	A coalition government led by Prime Minister Ylli Bufi took office.
1991	June	The Tenth Congress of the Communist Party disbanded the party and established the new Socialist Party of Albania (SPA).
1991	June	Albania was accepted as a full member of the OSCE Minsk Group.
1991	June	United States Secretary of State James Baker visited Albania.
1991	July	The Sigurimi was abolished and replaced by the National Information Service.
1991	August	Up to eighteen thousand Albanians crossed the Adriatic Sea to unsuccessfully seek asylum in Italy.
1991	August	The People's Assembly passed a law on economic activity that authorized private ownership of property, privatizing of state property, investment by foreigners, and private employment of workers.
1991	October	The United States reopened an embassy in Tirana.
1991	October	Albania joined the International Monetary Fund.
1991	December	The coalition government collapsed amid accusations that the Communist Party was blocking reform. Bufi resigned.
1991	December	Alia named Vilson Ahmeti Prime Minister and set elections for March 1992.
1992	February	The People's Assembly prevents OMONIA, the party representing Greek Albanians, from fielding candidates in the elections planned for March.
1992	March 22	In the midst of economic freefall and social chaos, a decisive electoral victory is won by the anticommunist opposition led by the Democratic Party. The Democrats win 62% of the votes and achieve an overall majority with 92 of the 140 seats in the parliament. The Socialists, with 26% of the vote, win 38 seats. Turnout is 90%. (to March 29)
1992	April 3	Alia resigns as president and is succeeded on April 9 by Sali Berisha, the first democratic leader of Albania since Bishop Noli. The first non-Communist government, headed by Aleksandër Meksi, is elected on April 13. Its stated priority is to establish law and order to transform the paralyzed economy through a reform program emphasizing a free-market economy and privatization.
1992	April 16	Eduard Selami is elected chairman of the Democratic Party.
1992	June	Albania signs the Black Sea Economic Cooperation Pact with ten other countries, including six former Soviet republics. The Pact establishes the Organization of the Black Sea Economic Cooperation.
1992	July	The Albanian Communist Party is outlawed, and its chairman, Hysni Milloshi, is arrested in Tirana and charged with illegally carrying a gun.
1992	July 26	Four months after its March defeat, the Socialist Party makes impressive gains in the country's first democratic local elections. The Democratic Party wins 43.2% of the vote, compared to 41.3% cast for the Socialists. Continued economic hardships, general apathy, and a split within the Democratic Party contributed to its poor showing. It holds local administrative control in most large cities, while the Socialists control much of the countryside.
1992	September	Former President Alia is detained, joining eighteen other former communist officials, including Nexhmije Hoxha, who are charged with corruption and other offenses.
1992	November 3	The split in the Democratic Party grows into a rift when a group of reform-minded Democrats break away and form a new party, the Democratic Alliance.
1992	December	Albania is granted membership of the Organisation of the Islamic Conference and in the same month applies to join NATO, becoming the first former Warsaw Pact country formally to seek membership in the Western alliance.
1993	January 27	Nexhmije Hoxha is sentenced to nine years' imprisonment, having been found guilty of embezzling state funds.
1993	February	Former prime minister Vilson Ahmeti is placed under house arrest, following charges of corruption.
1993	March	Manfred Wörner, Secretary General of NATO visits Tirana.
1993	April	Albania recognizes the Republic of Macedonia.
1993	April 25	Pope John Paul II makes a historic visit. (The last pope to travel to Albania – in 1464 – died en route.)
1993	May	Nexhmije Hoxha's prison sentence is increased by two years.
1993	July	Albania expels a Greek Orthodox cleric, who is alleged to have distributed maps showing southern Albania as Greek territory. Greece subsequently deports thousands of illegal Albanian migrant workers.
1993	July 30	The leader of the Socialist Party, former prime minister Nano, is arrested on allegations of abuse of power.
1993	August	Alia is arrested on charges of abuse of power.
1993	September	Ahmeti is sentenced to two years' imprisonment.
1993	September	President Berisha and President Momir Bulatović of Montenegro meet in Tirana to discuss ways of improving Albanian-Montenegrin relations.
1993	October	Greece recalls its ambassador for consultations after a series of border incidents and alleged human rights abuses in Albania.
1994		Albania's postcommunist transformation continues, with more progress in some areas than others. Greek-Albanian relations deteriorate, and Athens blocks European Union loans to Tirana, impeding Albania's much-needed integration into Europe. Gross domestic product grows by 8%, and inflation continues its downward spiral. Unemployment, however, remains the country's Achilles' heel; more than 300,000 workers are unemployed. Some $400 million sent home by Albanian emigrants play a vital role in boosting the domestic economy by increasing the volume of disposable income. For most, economic hardship and widespread poverty are the norm. Albania's foreign debt continues to soar. The political climate is relatively stable, but hostility between ruling and opposition forces continues to surface. The Socialist Party and other political groups accuse President Sali Berisha of becoming increasingly authoritarian. Albania makes considerable progress in foreign affairs, although relations with some of its neighbours continue to be fraught with problems. The impasse in relations between Belgrade and Tirana persists, but ties with Bulgaria, Turkey, the Republic of Macedonia, and Italy further improve. Relations with Greece raise worries about a new Balkan flash point.
1994	April	Following a raid on an army training camp in which two Albanian conscripts were killed, Tirana arrests five ethnic Greeks, finds them guilty of espionage and illegal possession of weapons, and sentences them to between six and eight years in prison. Angered by the verdict, (the court was being held behind closed doors, no international observers were allowed) Athens reportedly expels as many as 70,000 of the 300,000 illegal Albanian immigrants living in Greece.
1994	April	Fatos Nano is convicted of embezzlement of state funds during his premiership in 1991 and sentenced to 12 years' imprisonment; the ruling is upheld by an appeals court in the following month.
1994	July	Ramiz Alia is tried on a number of charges, including forced deportation of political prisoners, summary executions, and the upholding of the 1967 ban on religious activity. The charges are later changed to abuse of power and violation of citizens' rights. Alia pleads "not guilty" and protests that the allegations made against him are unclear; he is convicted, however, and sentenced to 9 years' imprisonment.
1994	October 4	A draft constitution is presented to Berisha. Failing to obtain the requisite two-thirds majority approval for it in the People's Assembly, Berisha calls for a national referendum, the first of its kind. Surprisingly, the November 6 vote goes against Berisha (53.9% of voters reject the draft constitution), perpetuating the deadlock with the Socialists.
1994	November	Alia's prison sentence is reduced to 5 years.
1995		Berisha still faces formidable political, economic, and social problems. The leading opposition Socialist Party threatens the Democratic Party's hold on power, while the latter cites notable successes in economic and foreign affairs and predicts victory in the parliamentary elections scheduled for March 1996. Among the 49 new legislative decisions approved by the People's Assembly in 1995 are land and property laws that positively affect the flow of domestic and foreign investments, especially in the field of agriculture. The process of privatization continues, with some 1,400 small-sized enterprises privatized. Albania's $700 million foreign debt is substantially reduced. Gross domestic product grows by an estimated 6%, and inflation drops to about 10%. The agricultural, construction, and private-service sectors register high rates of growth – 15%, 90%, and 25%, respectively. The industrial sector remains the weakest economic link, with continued production losses. Exports also lag. Continued progress is made in foreign affairs, with the exception of an impasse between Tirana and Belgrade. A slight improvement in Greek-Albanian relations is evidenced. U.S.-Albanian military cooperation develops quickly. Joint projects in 1995 include U.S. intelligence-gathering flights to Bosnia and Herzegovina from bases in Albania, exchanges of high-level military delegations, medical and military exercises, and the construction of Albania's only military hospital.
1995	March	The chairman of the Democratic Party, Eduard Selami, is dismissed at an extraordinary party congress for opposing Berisha's efforts to organize a further referendum for the draft constitution. Selami is replaced by Tritan Shehu.
1995	May	Italy deploys troops along its coast to stem the continued influx of Albanian illegal immigrants.
1995	June	Ilir Hoxha, son of Enver Hoxha, is convicted of inciting national hatred for denouncing leaders of the Democratic Party in a newspaper interview.
1995	July	Albania is admitted to the Council of Europe.
1995	July 7	The Supreme Court orders the immediate release of Alia, owing to the provisions of a new penal code, which took effect at the beginning of June. Also in July the case against Vilson Ahmeti is abandoned, owing to a lack of evidence.
1995	September	A first-ever meeting between U.S. and Albanian heads of state occurs. See also: Albania–United States relations
1995	September 1	As a result of an agreement between Albania and 41 Western banks, the country's debt owed to those institutions drops from $500 million to $100 million.
1995	November 27	Nano's prison sentence is reduced to 4 years. On December 30 Berisha reduces his sentence by a further 8 months.
1995	December 15	14 prominent Communist politicians are arrested, including former defense minister Prokop Murra and former president Haxhi Lleshi. (to December 16)
1996		Gross domestic product grows by an estimated 8%, while inflation rises by about 4–5%, mainly owing to the introduction of a value-added tax. Unemployment drops to a total of 170,000, or about 13%. The agricultural and especially the construction and private-service sectors continue to register robust two-digit growth. Remittances from Albanian émigrés in Greece, Italy, Germany, and the U.S. still account for an estimated 20% of GDP. The nation's relationship with Greece is improved when a high-ranking Greek official visits Albania, and a number of important cooperation agreements are signed. The impasse between Tirana and Belgrade continues, although ethnic Albanians from Kosovo are allowed to travel to Albania. Tirana dispatches a 33-man peacekeeping force to the German contingent of IFOR (the NATO-led Implementation Force) in Bosnia and Herzegovina, the first time in the country's history that Albanian troops have been stationed abroad.
1996		Albania receives an aid package from the U.S. worth $100 million.
1996	February 2	Alia is rearrested and charged with crimes against humanity.
1996	March 6	The former chief of the Sigurimi is arrested following bomb attacks in Tirana on February 26 and in Durrës on March 6.
1996	26 May	The third post-Communist parliamentary elections plunge Albania into its deepest political crisis since the demise of communist rule. Hours before the polls close, all major opposition parties pull out their candidates, accusing the ruling Democratic Party of engineering widespread election irregularities. Riot police violently break up a protest rally. On June 2 a second round is held, again boycotted by most of the opposition. The chairman of the Central Electoral Commission puts turnout at 59% compared to 89% in the first round. Final results give the ruling Democratic Party 122 seats in the 140-seat parliament (87% of the vote). The Socialists refuse to recognize the results and do not take their nine seats.
1996	July 11	Berisha forms a new enlarged (25-member) cabinet. Among the new ministers are Tritan Shehu as foreign minister and deputy premier, Ridvan Bode as finance minister, and Halit Shamata as interior minister. The government includes four female members, the widest female representation in the history of the country.
1996	November 5	The appeals court upholds prison sentences of up to 20 years on nine high-ranking officials of the communist era. They were sentenced on September 28 for putting thousands of dissidents into internal exile. Those charged included party leaders from Tirana, Lushnjë and other towns, as well as secret police and officials of the Interior Ministry.
1996	November 6	Shortly after midnight, in downtown Tirana an explosion takes place in the apartment of Prel Martini, chief judge of the appeals court. The bomb leaves his five-year-old daughter with a broken leg and injures Martini, his seven-year-old son and two women in neighbouring apartments. Prime Minister Aleksandër Meksi says the explosion is a politically motivated terrorist act.
1997		In the 1997 unrest in Albania the general elections of June 1997 brought the Socialists and their allies to power. President Berisha resigned from his post, and Socialists elected Rexhep Meidani as president of Albania. Albanian Socialist Party Chairman Fatos Nano was elected Prime Minister, a post which he held until October 1998, when he resigned as a result of the tense situation created in the country after the assassination of Azem Hajdari, a prominent leader of the Democratic Party. Pandeli Majko was then elected Prime Minister, and he served in this post until November 1999, when he was replaced by Ilir Meta. Albania approved its constitution through a popular referendum which was held in November 1998, but which was boycotted by the opposition. The general local elections of October 2000 marked the loss of control of the Democrats over the local governments and a victory for the Socialists.
1997	January 24	Following the collapse of several "get-rich-quick" pyramid schemes, in which hundreds of thousands of Albanians lost their life savings, enraged investors go on the rampage in the southern town of Lushnjë. Foreign Minister Shehu is attacked by demonstrators there on January 25. On January 26, thousands of people converge on central Tirana and clash with riot police. Government buildings are set ablaze in towns and cities across the country. In February unrest engulfs Vlorë, causing several deaths. (to January 26)
1997	March	The UN Security Council approves dispatching a multinational military force to Albania to oversee the distribution of international humanitarian aid and maintain order.
1997	March 1	Prime Minister Aleksandër Meksi resigns.
1997	March 2	A national state of emergency is declared. Rioters take control of the town of Sarandë, seizing weapons from police headquarters and army barracks. With astonishing speed the entire military establishment melts away, the security service dissolves, and the people arm themselves with every type of weapon, including Kalashnikovs and even tanks – an estimated 650,000 weapons are seized. Most of the southern half of the country falls into the hands of ragtag rebels and criminal gangs. More than 10,000 persons flee to Italy, which in turn causes a governmental crisis in Rome. Several high government officials, including Defense Minister Safet Zhulali, flee abroad.
1997	March 3	Despite widespread demands for his resignation, on President Berisha is reelected unopposed by Parliament (113-1 with 4 abstentions).
1997	March 6	Insurgents take control of Tepelenë, and on March 8 they seize Gjirokastër, the last southern government stronghold. (to March 8)
1997	March 11	Bashkim Fino of the opposition Socialist Party is appointed as prime minister. Arjan Starova becomes foreign minister; Shaqir Vukaj, defense minister; Arben Malaj, finance minister; Belul Celo, interior minister. Unrest spreads to northern Albania, and by March 13 engulfs all major population centres, including Tirana. Alia flees jail during the insurrection. Nano is pardoned by Berisha on March 16. Foreign countries begin to evacuate their nationals from the country, which is now in a state of anarchy. More than 360 people have been killed and 3,500 wounded in three months. The tragic events also cause the economy to suffer. Unemployment soars over the 25% mark, inflation rises, and gross domestic product, which registered 8–11% increases in the previous few years, drops by 7%. The currency is devalued from 108 to more than 150 leks to the US dollar. (to March 16)
1997	March 28	More than 80 people die when an Albanian refugee ship collides with an Italian ship in the Adriatic Sea.
1997	April 9	The Socialists end their boycott of parliament and take up their seats.
1997	April 12	The pretender to the throne, Leka I, returns to Albania and calls for a referendum on restoring the monarchy.
1997	April 15	The Italian-led international protection force begins arriving in Albania. Some 7,000 troops from eight European countries participate in "Operation Alba."
1997	16 May	Berisha calls new elections for June 29.
1997	June 2	A bomb attack injures 27 people in Tirana.
1997	June 4	A grenade is thrown at Berisha during a campaign rally outside Tirana but it is deactivated.
1997	June 29	The Socialist Party wins parliamentary elections, with 100 seats out of 155. Their coalition allies win 17 seats, and Berisha's Democratic Party 27. Turnout in the first round is about 65%. In a referendum held at the same time, about one-third of voters support the restoration of the monarchy. The Socialists say Albania will be a parliamentary republic, with executive power concentrated in the hands of the prime minister rather than the president. (to July 6)
1997	July 3	Interior Minister Belul Celo resigns.
1997	July 7	Tritan Shehu resigns as Democratic Party chairman.
1997	July 23	President Berisha resigns.
1997	July 24	Parliament elects secretary of the Socialist Party of Albania and former physics professor Rexhep Meidani as President of Albania (110-3 with 2 abstentions). Meidani then accepts the resignation of Prime Minister Fino, and names Socialist Party leader Nano as new Prime minister of Albania.
1997	July 25	A new 20-member multiparty cabinet (excluding the Democratic Party) is presented by Nano, including Paskal Milo as foreign minister, Sabit Brokaj as defense minister, Neritan Ceka as interior minister, and Arben Malaj retaining his post of finance minister.
1997	September 18	The Democrats leave parliament when one of their deputies, Azem Hajdari, is shot and wounded by a Socialist inside the chamber.
1997	October 21	Berisha is elected chairman of the Democratic Party.
1997	December 23	Alia, who escaped from jail in March and left the country, returns from abroad. He, two ex-interior ministers – Hekuran Isai (1982–89, 1990–91) and Simon Stefani (1989–90) – and the ex-chief prosecutor were acquitted on October 20 of killing 58 people who attempted to flee the country illegally between 1990 and 1992. Prosecutors dropped the charges following a supreme court ruling that 32 other senior ex-Communists could not be held liable for alleged offenses which had not been a crime at the time.
1998	April	Following widespread allegations of government inefficiency and corruption in his administration, Nano reshuffles his cabinet, reducing the number of ministers.
1998	May	More than 13,000 refugees flee into Albania after the eruption in February of civil war between the Serbian police and army and the ethnic Albanian separatist Kosovo Liberation Army (KLA) in the neighbouring province of Kosovo. The Albanian Foreign Ministry repeatedly charges Yugoslavia with border violations that include shelling and sniping and with conducting massacres of Kosovo's civilian population. It also calls for NATO military intervention to stop the fighting.
1998	June 21	Local by-elections confirm continuing popular support for Nano's coalition, which wins in five municipalities and six smaller communities. The opposition wins in two municipalities and three communities. (to June 28)
1998	August	Police arrest former defense minister Safet Zhulali, former interior minister Halit Shamata, former chairman of state control Blerim Cela, and three other former officials of Berisha's government on charges of crimes against humanity in conjunction with their alleged roles in the suppression of unrest in 1997. General Prosecutor Arben Rakipi charges the six with having ordered the use of chemical weapons, airplanes, and helicopters against civilians. Subsequently, Berisha calls on his supporters to bring down the government "with all means," saying that the arrests were politically motivated.
1998	September 12	Azem Hajdari, a senior leader of the Democratic Party, is shot dead by a gunman as he steps out of the party's office in Tirana; on September 13 Democratic Party supporters storm and set fire to the prime minister's office in a protest against the killing. Government forces counterattack and reoccupy the buildings, and on September 15 Berisha surrenders two tanks posted outside his headquarters after the government threatened to use force if his followers did not give up their weapons.
1998	September 18	Albania's parliament lifts the immunity from prosecution of opposition leader Berisha, clearing the way for prosecutors to charge him with attempting a coup.
1998	September 21	Ahmet Krasniqi, leading member of the self-styled ethnic Albanian government in Kosovo, is shot dead in Albania.
1998	September 28	Prime Minister Nano resigns after failing to get the backing of his coalition for a cabinet reshuffle in the wake of the outbreak of political violence two weeks ago. Pandeli Majko is named to succeed him.
1998	October 2	Pandeli Majko, 30, becomes Europe's youngest head of government after being sworn in as Albanian prime minister. Petro Koçi becomes interior minister and Anastas Angjeli finance minister. On October 8 the new government wins a parliamentary confidence vote (104–0; the opposition Democratic Party is boycotting Parliament).
1998	October 21	Albania's parliament votes in favour of a draft constitution and agrees to put it to a referendum. This is held on November 22, and 93.5% of the voters support the new constitution. Turnout is 50.6%. President Meidani signs the constitution into law on November 28, Albania's independence day. The new constitution, which replaces a package of laws introduced after the collapse of communism, provides for the separation of powers, rule of law, and the independence of the judiciary. It also guarantees human rights and the protection of minorities. The opposition Democratic Party, which (ignoring calls by the Organization for Security and Cooperation in Europe and the Council of Europe) boycotted the referendum and the parliamentary commission which drafted the constitution, says the results were fixed and that it can not recognize the new constitution.
1999	March	During the 78 days of NATO bombing of Yugoslavia, about 450,000 of a total 750,000 Kosovar refugees flee into Albania. That figure is equal to almost 15% of Albania's total population. The hostilities turn Albania into a key operational theatre for international relief agencies and NATO forces in Albania, called Kosovo Force (KFOR), which launch a humanitarian relief operation. In addition, within the framework of the NATO air campaign, U.S. forces deploy 24 Apache antitank helicopters and long-range artillery pieces in northern Albania. The northern Albanian border regions of Kukës and Tropojë bear the brunt of the refugee influx and military operations. Supplying the refugees and transporting them to other parts of the country creates immense logistic difficulties for the United Nations High Commissioner for Refugees and other relief agencies. The region also sees ongoing border clashes between Yugoslav forces, who continually shell Albanian border villages, and Kosovo Liberation Army (KLA) fighters operating in part from support bases inside Albania. The border area remains heavily mined after the fighting subsides. With the end of the fighting, Albania's relations improve with its neighbours – Montenegro, Macedonia, Greece, and the new UN administration in Kosovo, with whom the Albanian Foreign Ministry plans a series of joint regional development projects within the framework of the European Union-funded Stability Pact for South Eastern Europe. Early accomplishments include the installation of a powerful microwave-telephone connection between Albania and Kosovo and the signing of infrastructure development projects with Montenegro. (to June)
1999	20 May	NATO says it will supply long-term military aid to Albania and Macedonia and draw up plans to help the two Balkan countries meet the alliance's entry requirements.
1999	20 May	Spartak Poçi is appointed interior minister, replacing Petro Koçi. Poçi subsequently manages to break up 12 criminal gangs throughout the country, most notably those in Tropojë, where special police units restore order in September. Because of frequent armed robberies, Tropojë earlier had been a "no-go" area for international aid agencies. The Organization for Security and Cooperation in Europe closed its office there on June 16 after gunmen killed two of its local staff.
1999	July 17	At an extraordinary party congress in Tirana, PDS leader Sali Berisha declares that the party ends its boycott of parliament as a gesture of gratitude to the U.S. for its engagement on behalf of the Kosovars. So far the PDS has been strongly under the control of Berisha, but late in the year the reformists in the PDS openly clash with Berisha's supporters over party strategy. The reformers argue that the parliamentary boycott was leading to political isolation of the party.
1999	September 15	Nano accuses Majko of having allowed Kosovar guerrillas to smuggle arms through Albanian territory.
1999	October 25	Prime Minister Majko resigns after losing the leadership of the ruling Socialist Party earlier in the month to Fatos Nano. On October 27 President Meidani asks Ilir Meta to form the next government. He is sworn in October 29.
1999	November 11	The most significant success in administrative reform comes with the passage of a new law on the civil service, designed to stop the practice of political appointments and to increase the independence and integrity of career civil servants. Implementation of the law and the creation of a workable institutional framework occupy much of the following year.
2000	February	It is reported that the government has shifted its attention away from the construction of the east–west trunk road "Corridor 8," designed to link the South Balkans to the Adriatic, and is instead focusing on an internal north–south highway.
2000	March	A "quick start" package is launched within the Stability Pact for South Eastern Europe, the 28-nation agreement signed in 1999 to restore peace, stability, and prosperity to the region. Albania receives about €112 million (about $109 million) for the rehabilitation of roads, railroads, harbours, power and water lines, and the airport in Tirana. The Stability Pact earmarks an additional €320 million (about $311 million) for near-term infrastructure projects to be implemented subsequently. The Stability Pact also dominates Albania's foreign-policy agenda. Numerous projects designed to enhance cooperation between Albania and other southeastern European countries in the fields of human rights, democracy, and security are launched.
2000	14 May	Opposition leader Sali Berisha leads 4,000 protestors in the southern port of Vlorë in the first anti-government rally led by the controversial former president.
2000	24 May	President Meidani travels to Kosovo, the first visit ever by an Albanian head of state to that heavily ethnic Albanian-populated province in Yugoslavia. Meidani emphasizes Albania's commitment to the creation of "a Europe of the regions" (that is, rather than a continent based on traditional nation-states) and speaks against the desirability of creating a "Greater Albania" that would include ethnic Albanians in neighbouring countries, while stressing the need for closer regional and European integration.
2000	June 14	Berisha is barred from entering the Albanian-dominated Yugoslav province of Kosovo by the UN peacekeeping force, which deems him a threat to public order.
2000	July 7	In a cabinet reshuffle, Ilir Gjoni replaces Luan Hajdaraga as defense minister.
2000	September 18	EU foreign ministers include Albania in a list of Balkan countries offered duty-free access for 95% of their exports. The list does not include neighbouring Serbia and comes as part of a package of measures designed to encourage voters there to embrace reform and oust their federal president, Slobodan Milošević.
2000	October	Following the election of Vojislav Koštunica as president of Yugoslavia, Albanian Foreign Minister Paskal Milo makes the resumption of regular bilateral relations dependent on Serbia freeing Kosovo Albanian prisoners and recognizing its responsibility for crimes against humanity in the Kosovo war.
2000	October 1	The ruling Socialist Party of Albania emerges as the clear winner of municipal elections, taking 50 municipalities and 218 communities – including the mayoralty of Tirana for the first time since 1992 – although the Democratic Party throughout the year focused attention on rallying support for its candidates, accusing the governing Alliance for the State coalition of corruption and smuggling, charges that the coalition dismissed. The Democrats win only in 11 municipalities and 80 communities after calling for a partial boycott of the vote in the runoff. Two municipalities and 17 communities go to smaller parties and independent candidates. (to October 15)

== 21st century ==
Year	Date	Event
2001		Growth in gross domestic product is 7.3%, just slightly less than the 7.8% registered in 2000. Unemployment drops from 17.1% in 1999 to 13.3% in 2001, thanks to a government-supported job creation program that includes infrastructure-development projects within the framework of the Stability Pact for South Eastern Europe.
2001		Although Albania has made strides toward democratic reform and maintaining the rule of law, serious deficiencies in the electoral code remain to be addressed, as demonstrated in the June 2001 parliamentary elections. International observers judged the 2001 elections to be acceptable, but the Union for Victory Coalition, the second-largest vote recipient, disputed the results and boycotted parliament until January 31, 2002. The Socialists re-elected Ilir Meta as Prime Minister in August 2001, a post which he held till February 2002, when he resigned due to party infighting. Pandeli Majko was re-elected Prime Minister in February 2002.
2001	March	The large ethnic Albanian minority in neighbouring Macedonia stages an armed rebellion. Although Albania's prime minister Ilir Meta supports international peace negotiations (which lead to a truce and a peace settlement in late August), there is evidence to suggest that Albanian border guards have at first failed to seal the border completely to arms smugglers supplying the rebels in Macedonia.
2001	April	The government is strongly criticized for its unsuccessful policy toward human trafficking. The International Organization for Migration (IOM) joins Save the Children in highlighting the trade in eastern European women and even Albanian children, and accuses local Albanian police of colluding in the lucrative industry. IOM points out that there have been fewer prosecutions of smugglers than of victims of the trade.
2001	April 18	The government announces that legislative elections will take place on June 24.
2001	June 24	In the first round of the parliamentary elections (turnout 54.9%), the ruling Socialist Party, with a reform-oriented program, wins 31 seats; the opposition Union for Victory coalition, formed by the Democratic Party, receives 16 seats. In the second round on July 8, the Socialist Party wins another 44 and the Union for Victory 30. The opposition had been split since 2000, when the New Democrat Party was formed, whose leader, Genc Pollo, charged Berisha with failing to offer convincing answers to the country's essential problems. Pollo's leadership appealed to many voters who were looking for a group among the opposition that could demonstrate some political competence. The new party wins six seats in the new parliament.
2001	July 30	The opposition Democratic Party (PDS) announces that it will not accept the results of the "farcical" legislative election and that it will consequently stay away from the People's Assembly. According to final results announced on August 21 the ruling Socialist Party won a clear majority of 73 seats in the 140-seat Assembly, while the Union for Victory won only 46. Observers from the Organization for Security and Cooperation in Europe disagree with the PDS and describe the poll as free and fair.
2001	September 3	The Democratic Party boycotts the opening session of the People's Assembly in defiance of the government's recent electoral victory.
2001	September 12	Parliament gives Prime Minister Ilir Meta's new government a vote of confidence. Within the governing coalition the Socialist Party controls all key ministries. Arta Dade becomes foreign minister (the first woman in Albanian history to hold that post), Ilir Gjoni interior minister, and Pandeli Majko defense minister; Anastas Angjeli remains finance minister. The chairman of the Social Democratic Party, Skënder Gjinushi, takes charge of labour and social affairs, while another Social Democrat, former foreign minister Paskal Milo, becomes minister of Euro-Atlantic integration. Former justice minister Arben Imami becomes minister of local government and decentralization, pledging to focus on strengthening the role of cities and towns; Niko Kacalidha (of the Union Party, which represents many ethnic Greeks) is appointed to the new post of state minister for minorities and the diaspora. For his part, Prime Minister Meta pledges to upgrade power supplies, proceed with privatization, fight corruption and organized crime, improve ties with Western Europe and neighbours in the Balkan region, and promote free trade.
2001	December	Five cabinet members resign after a concerted campaign by Fatos Nano, the leader of the ruling Socialist Party, to bring about a reshuffle. Nano has accused the government of high-level corruption.
2002		Albania is working to conclude free-trade agreements with Macedonia, Yugoslavia, Bosnia and Hercegovina, and Croatia. The economy suffers a slight setback. Unemployment creeps up during the year. A United Nations Development Project report estimates that one-third of the population lives in poverty, earning less than $1 per capita per day. Large segments of the population live from subsistence agriculture and do not receive unemployment benefits.
2002	January 29	Prime Minister of Albania Ilir Meta resigns in anger over a continuing row with the leader of his Socialist Party, Fatos Nano, who has been resisting the appointment of ministers to vacant cabinet positions. Earlier that day the opposition Democratic Party ended its four-month boycott of the People's Assembly.
2002	February 7	Defense Minister Pandeli Majko receives the backing of the various warring factions within the ruling Socialist Party to be the country's next prime minister. Nominated by outgoing premier Meta, Majko agrees to accommodate supporters of party leader Nano in a new cabinet. The previous deadlock led the International Monetary Fund (IMF) and the World Bank to freeze aid payments until the situation was resolved. On February 16 President Meidani accepts Majko's proposed cabinet, including Kastriot Islami as finance minister, Luan Rama as defense minister, and Stefan Çipa as interior minister; Arta Dade is to remain as foreign minister. The cabinet is approved by Parliament on February 22.
2002	June 24	Parliament elects Alfred Moisiu as president (97–19). He is sworn in July 24. On July 25 Prime Minister Majko resigns. On July 31 Parliament approves (81–48) a new government with Socialist Party Chairman Fatos Nano as prime minister, Majko as defense minister, Ilir Meta as foreign minister, and Luan Rama as interior minister; Kastriot Islami remains finance minister. Nano's appointment marks the end of a power struggle between the party leader and his two younger challengers Meta and Majko, both of whom had served as prime minister since Nano resigned the post during a period of civil unrest in 1998. Media analysis suggests that Nano elbowed Meta and Majko aside in a grab for power after realizing that he was too controversial a figure to aspire to the presidency. The European Parliament had urged Albanian legislators to elect a president who would be acceptable to both the governing coalition and the opposition. Moreover, Meta and the outgoing president, Meidani, both openly opposed Nano's candidacy for the presidency. The election of Moisiu essentially sealed the Socialist legislators' compromise with the opposition led by the Democratic Party. Nano and Berisha say that the deal signals that the two rival party leaders have put years of fighting behind them. Moisiu, a 73-year-old retired general, served as president of the Albanian North Atlantic Treaty Association and is considered friendly by the opposition.
2002	August 29	The Organization for Security and Cooperation in Europe's chief of mission, Geert-Hinrich Ahrens, praises Albania in his end-of-mission address to the OSCE Permanent Council, reporting that the country is "in the forefront of reform in the region" and adding that recent achievements have "brought Albania to the threshold of opening negotiations for a Stabilization and Association Agreement with the European Union." Finnish diplomat Osmo Lipponen succeeds Ahrens on September 1.
2003	February 12	Albania opens negotiations with the European Commission on a Stabilization and Association Agreement, the first step towards membership of the European Union. (to February 13)
2003	2 May	U.S. Secretary of State Colin Powell signs a partnership agreement with Albania, Macedonia, and Croatia intended to help them achieve NATO membership.
2003	July 18	Angered by Nano's comments during a cabinet meeting, Foreign Minister Meta resigns in protest at Nano's "nihilistic, tendentious, and denigrating" criticism. On July 22 Marko Bello is nominated to be foreign minister, but he is rejected by parliament on July 28. On July 29 Luan Hajdaraga is named acting foreign minister.
2003	October 12	The Socialist Party wins a narrow victory over the Democratic Party in local elections. Turnout is around 50%.
2003	October 17	Interior Minister Luan Rama is sacked. He has been accused of punching the editor-in-chief of Vizion Plus television, Ilir Babaramo, in a Tirana restaurant on October 14 because of criticism broadcast by the TV station two months ago. On October 23 Prime Minister Nano's nominees for foreign minister, Namik Dokle, and for interior minister, Fatmir Xhafa, are rejected by parliament. On October 25 Nano picks Igli Toska to be acting interior minister.
2003	October 19	In Tirana, more than 2,000 people hold a "people's marathon" to celebrate the beatification of Mother Teresa, who was born to Albanian parents in what is now North Macedonia.
2003	December 29	Parliament finally approves new ministers for the vacant posts. Kastriot Islami becomes foreign minister, Arben Malaj succeeds him as finance minister, and Igli Toska becomes interior minister.
2004	January	A national day of mourning is called after 20 people dies in a shipwreckage during an illegal attempt to cross the Adriatic Sea and reach Italy.
2004	February 7	Some 2,000 protesters gather at Prime Minister Nano's office. Stones are thrown and an attempt to storm the building is repelled by guards. Earlier in the day over 4,000 demonstrators rallied in Tirana's central square and, led by Democratic Party leader Berisha, called for Nano to quit.
2005	July 3	Parliamentary elections end with a victory for the opposition Democratic Party (PD) and its allies, prominently the Republican Party (PR). Former president Sali Berisha became prime minister as a result of the election.
2005	September	After two months of political wrangling, former president Sali Berisha emerges as the victor in July's general election
2006	April	Speedboats are banned in coastal waters, in order to fight people and drug smuggling
2006	June	A Stabilisation and Association Agreement is signed between Albania and the European Union
2007		Despite the political situation, the economy of Albania grew at an estimated 5% in 2007. The Albanian lek has strengthened from 143 lekë to the US dollar in 2000 to 92 lekë in 2007, mainly due to the depreciation of the US dollar, but also thanks to the overall improvement of the Albanian economy.
2007	June 10	US President George W. Bush visited Albania, the first sitting US president to do so. While Mr Bush was glad-handing cheering crowds, it appears as if his wristwatch is stolen. TV footage of the President being mobbed, taken by the Albanian TV station News24, was broadcast on Italian TV news bulletins and watched by thousands on YouTube. It was later reported that Bush had given the watch to a guard.
2007	July	Bamir Topi, ruling party chairmanpresident, is elected by the Parliament as President of Albania, after three failed round highlighted the risk of snap elections.
2008	March 15	An explosion in a badly-maintained arms depot causes 16 deaths and over 300 injured, damaging Tirana airport. Defense minister Fatmir Mediu resigns.
2008	June 12	Opposition Socialist Party leaves the Parliament, accusing the ruling Democratic Party of postponing voting on five new members of the Supreme Court awaiting appointment by President Bamir Topi.
2009	April	Albania joins NATO and submit application for membership in the European Union
2009	July	Sali Berisha's centre-right Democratic Party wins 2009 parliamentary elections by a narrow margin. Prior to the election, the electoral law was changed to a regional proportionally system.Berisha's alliance won enough seats to form a government, though it fell one seat short of a majority during the elections of Jun 28, 2009, having to join forces with a splinter socialist party, the Socialist Movement for Integration of Ilir Meta, whom Berisha appointed to the post of Deputy Prime Minister for Foreign Affairs, and later Minister of Economy, Trade and Energy. It is the first time since the start of multi-party democracy in 1991 that a ruling party has been forced into a coalition through not winning enough seats on its own.
2009	November	Protests begin in Tirana, led by opposition Socialist Party leader Edi Rama, against allegedly rigged vote counting in the 2009 elections. Berisha has refused any recount of the votes, on the ground that the Albanian Constitution do not foresee such procedure. The political crisis between government and opposition has worsened over time, with the Socialists abandoning parliamentary debates for months and staging hungerstrikes to ask for internal and international support.
2010	May	The Socialist Party starts a civil disobedience campaign against the government, asking for a new count of votes, and including hunger strike of opposition leaders
2010	September	Economy minister Dritan Prifti resigns after being involved in a corruption scandal.
2010	October 28	The opposition Socialist Party again walks out of the Parliament
2010	November	The European Union rejects Albania's request for EU candidate status, but visa are liberalized. The ongoing political crisis was one of the reason of the refusal of granting Albania official candidacy status
2011	January 7	The Central Election Commission begins burning the ballots of the 2009 parliamentary elections, in a routine process leading to the 8 May local elections, making a second count (repeatedly requested by opposition) impossible. The Socialist Party has accused the CEC and the Berisha government to attempt hiding vote manipulation.
2011	January 14	Economy and Trade Minister Ilir Meta resigns after being involved in a corruption scandal.
2011	January 21	Clashes break out between police and protesters in an anti-government rally in front of the Government building in Tirana. Three people are shot dead. The EU issues a statement to Albanian politicians, warning both sides to refrain from violence.
2011	8 May	Local elections see the victory of the Socialist Party of Albania (PS) in the main cities outside Tirana, Lezha and Scutari; The Organization for Security and Co-operation in Europe released a mixed evaluation of the electoral process, which was considered "competitive and transparent, but took place in an environment of high polarization and mistrust". In Tirana, the match was between Edi Rama, incumbent mayor and PS leader, and Lulzim Basha, DP minister of the interior. After a long process of votes counting, Rama was first declared winner for a tight margin of 10 votes. Then, the DP-led Central Electoral Commission decided to add to the count some of the votes misplaced in the wrong boxes, a move on doubtful legal grounds that was contested by the opposition as well as by the OSCE. Basha was finally declared winner for 83 votes. The European Commission president José Manuel Barroso consequently cancelled his visit to Tirana; the Nobel-prize Ismail Kadaré pledged him to withdraw his candidacy to avoid the "collapse" and "isolation" of Albania.
2012	September 21	September 2012 Hunger strike of former politically persecuted in Albania (2012)

== See also ==
- Timeline of Tirana
- List of years in Albania

== Bibliography ==
- William Henry Overall, ed. (1870). "Albania, Turkey". Dictionary of Chronology. London: William Tegg. hdl:2027/uc2.ark:/13960/t9m32q949.
- George Henry Townsend (1877), "Albania, European Turkey", Manual of Dates (5th ed.), London: Frederick Warne & Co., hdl:2027/wu.89097349427 – via HathiTrust
- Benjamin Vincent (1910), "Albania, a province in European Turkey", Haydn's Dictionary of Dates (25th ed.), London: Ward, Lock & Co., hdl:2027/loc.ark:/13960/t89g6g776
- Afrim Krasniqi: The End of Albania's Siberia. Tirana 1998.
- Fischer, Bernd Jürgen (1999). Albania at War, 1939–1945. C. Hurst & Co. Publishers. ISBN 978-1-85065-531-2.
- "Albania". Political Chronology of Europe. Europa Publications. 2003. ISBN 978-1-135-35687-3.
- Harold B. Segel (2003). "Chronology of Major Political Events, 1944-2002: Albania". Columbia Guide to the Literatures of Eastern Europe Since 1945. Columbia University Press. ISBN 978-0-231-11404-2.
- Afrim Krasniqi: Civil Society in Albania. Tirana 2004.ISBN 99927-946-6-6
- Afrim Krasniqi: Political Parties in Albania 1920–2006.Tirana 2006.ISBN 99943-861-1-5
- David Turnock (2006). "Chronology: Albania". The Economy of East Central Europe, 1815-1989: Stages of Transformation in a Peripheral Region. Routledge. p. 422+. ISBN 978-1-134-67876-1.
- Robert Elsie (2010). "Chronology". Historical Dictionary of Albania (2nd ed.). Scarecrow Press. ISBN 978-0-8108-7380-3.
