= List of bazaars in Albania =

A bazaar or souk, is a permanently enclosed marketplace or street where goods and services are exchanged or sold.

The term bazaar originates from the Persian word bāzār. The term bazaar is sometimes also used to refer to the "network of merchants, bankers and craftsmen" who work in that area. Although the word "bazaar" is of Persian origin, its use has spread and now has been accepted into the vernacular in countries around the world.

The term souk (Arabic: سوق suq, Hebrew: שוק shuq, Syriac: ܫܘܩܐ shuqa, Armenian: շուկա shuka, Spanish: zoco, also spelled souq, shuk, shooq, soq, esouk, succ, suk, sooq, suq, soek) is used in Western Asian, North African and some Horn African cities (Amharic: ሱቅ sooq).

== List of Bazaars in Albania ==
Name	Location	Picture	Notes
New Bazaar	Tirana		The New Bazaar is a neighbourhood in Tirana, Albania. The name of the neighbourhood stems from the groceries marketplace (the bazaar, in Albanian: pazar), which is situated in the area. It is located east of the central boulevard. Along with Mujos it forms part of the Old Town of Tirana and is one of the oldest areas of the city. The old historic Kokonozi Mosque of Ottoman times is situated here.
Old Bazaar of Korçë	Korçë		Old Bazaar of Korçë is an Ottoman-era bazaar in Korçë, Albania. Established about 500 years ago, it is composed of old Ottoman and Roman architectonic style buildings which for centuries were used as shops, guesthouses or khans. It is said to be noted for selling goats and handbags.
Shkodër Bazaar	Shkodër		The Shkodër Bazaar was the economic and civic hub of Shkodër, Albania for centuries and was one of the most important trade hubs in the Western Balkans. After the rise of the People's Socialist Republic of Albania in 1944, the bazaar became a camp for refugees from the Orthodox population of Greek-speaking Albanians fleeing the Greek Civil War. In 1968, the bazaar was demolished and replaced with a park.
