= Shamata (name) =

Shamata is both a given name and a surname. Notable people with the name include:

- Shamata Anchan (born 1990), Indian model and television actress
- Chuck Shamata (born 1942), Canadian actor
- Halit Shamata (born 1954), Albanian author and politician
