= Institute for Public Policy and Good Governance =

Albanian think tank

- Abbreviation: IPPM
- Type: Public Policy Think Tank
- Location: Tirana, Albania
- President: Arben Malaj
- Website: ippm.al

The Institute for Public Policy and Good Governance is an Albanian think tank based in Tirana, Albania. Being focused in public policy and good governance issues, IPPM conducts research and promotes best practices for the good governance in public and private sector being guided from the principles of transparency and public integrity. Its primary focus consists in analyzing public finances developments in Albania and in the Southeastern Europe countries.

The Institute's stated mission is to "contribute in public realization and engagement on the good governance challenges through developing and promoting alternatives for more quality in public and private sector governance".

IPPM states that its team of experts "represent diverse points of view" and describes itself as non-partisan non for profit think-tank.

== Aims ==
As an active think-tank the IPPM aims in: - Development and promotion of most effective practices of good governance in public and private sector. - Fostering public debate on good governance issues - Coordination and cooperation with all stake-holders and building dialogue among them - Assisting the reformation of public administration - Offering support to in institutions that promote social, economic and political development - Promoting policies and effective administrative actions through public communication guaranteeing the freedom of information to citizens. - Supporting better institutions in serving citizens.

== President ==
The President of Institute for Public Policy and Good Governance is Arben Malaj. He has been Minister of Finance and Economy of Albania different times from 1997 until 2005. He is known for transforming the Albanian economy into a European profile, after the hard social-economic crisis that this country passed during the year 1997. Malaj served as Member of the Albanian Parliament for several years.

== Founders ==
The founding members of IPPM is a team of experts and professors with an extensive experience in academia and public administration. Many of the experts of the Institute come from international professional backgrounds including World Bank, European Commission, EBRD, IMF and United Nations.

== See also ==
- Good Governance
- Arben Malaj
