= New Bazaar, Tirana =

Neighborhood in Tirana, Albania

New Bazaar
- Pazari i Ri
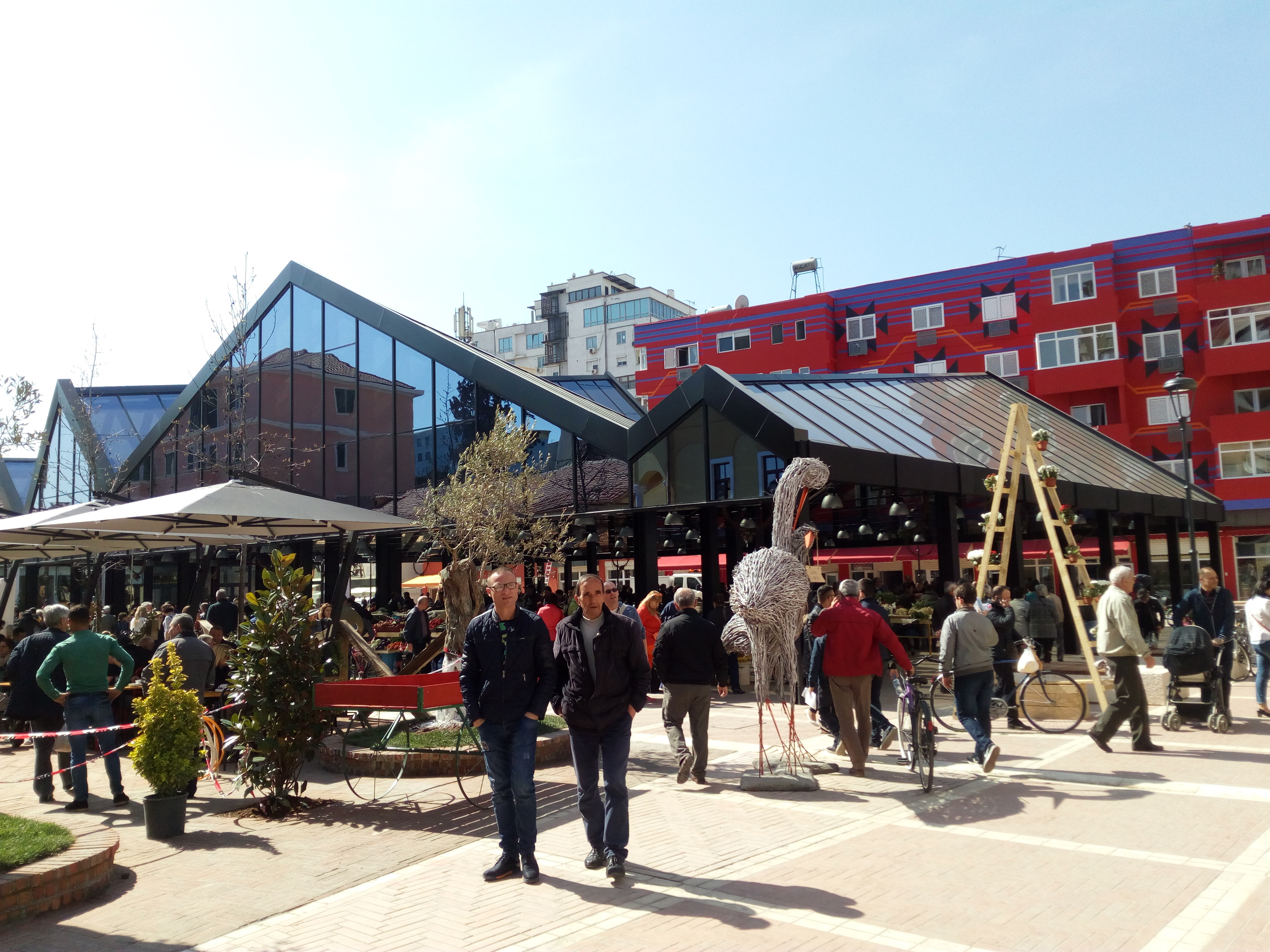
- Inside the New Bazaar
- Interactive map of New Bazaar
- Location: Tirana, Albania
- Coordinates: 41.33009°N 19.82470°E
- Type: Bazaar

The New Bazaar (Albanian: Pazari i Ri) is a neighbourhood east of the central boulevard in Tirana, Albania, named after a bazaar in the area. Along with Mujos it forms part of the Old Town of Tirana. The historic Kokonozi Mosque is situated there.

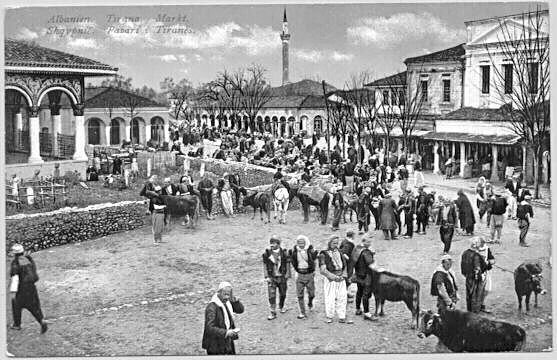
The old bazaar in 1900

The New Bazaar was built in 1931 at the site of the historic Old Bazaar, the latter extending to present day Skanderbeg Square. In 2017, the place got completely repatched and lost most of what was left of its historic beauty from Ottoman times. Several modernist-style buildings got erected on and beneath the historic marketplace.

== Gallery ==
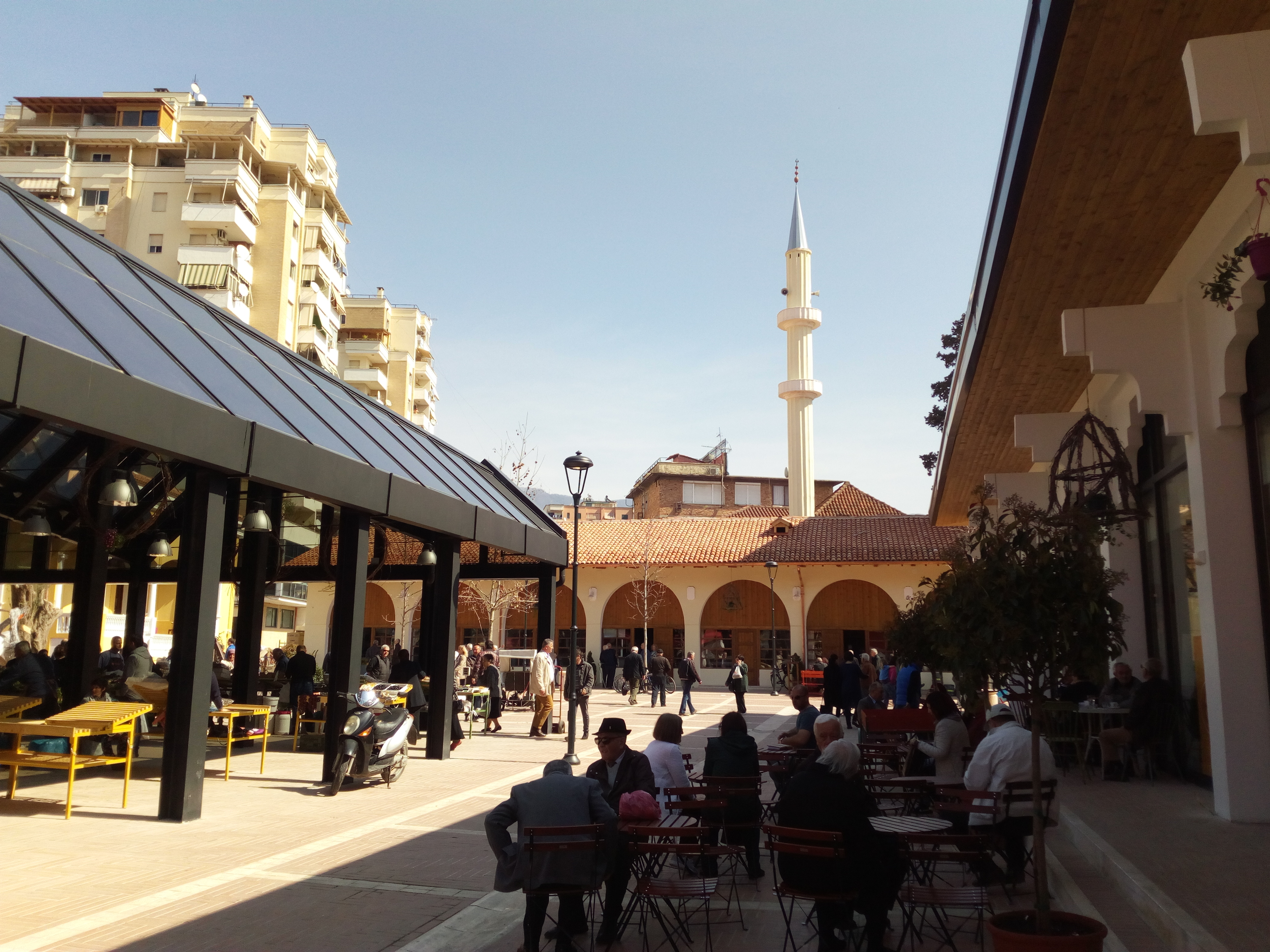
View of the Kokonozi Mosque

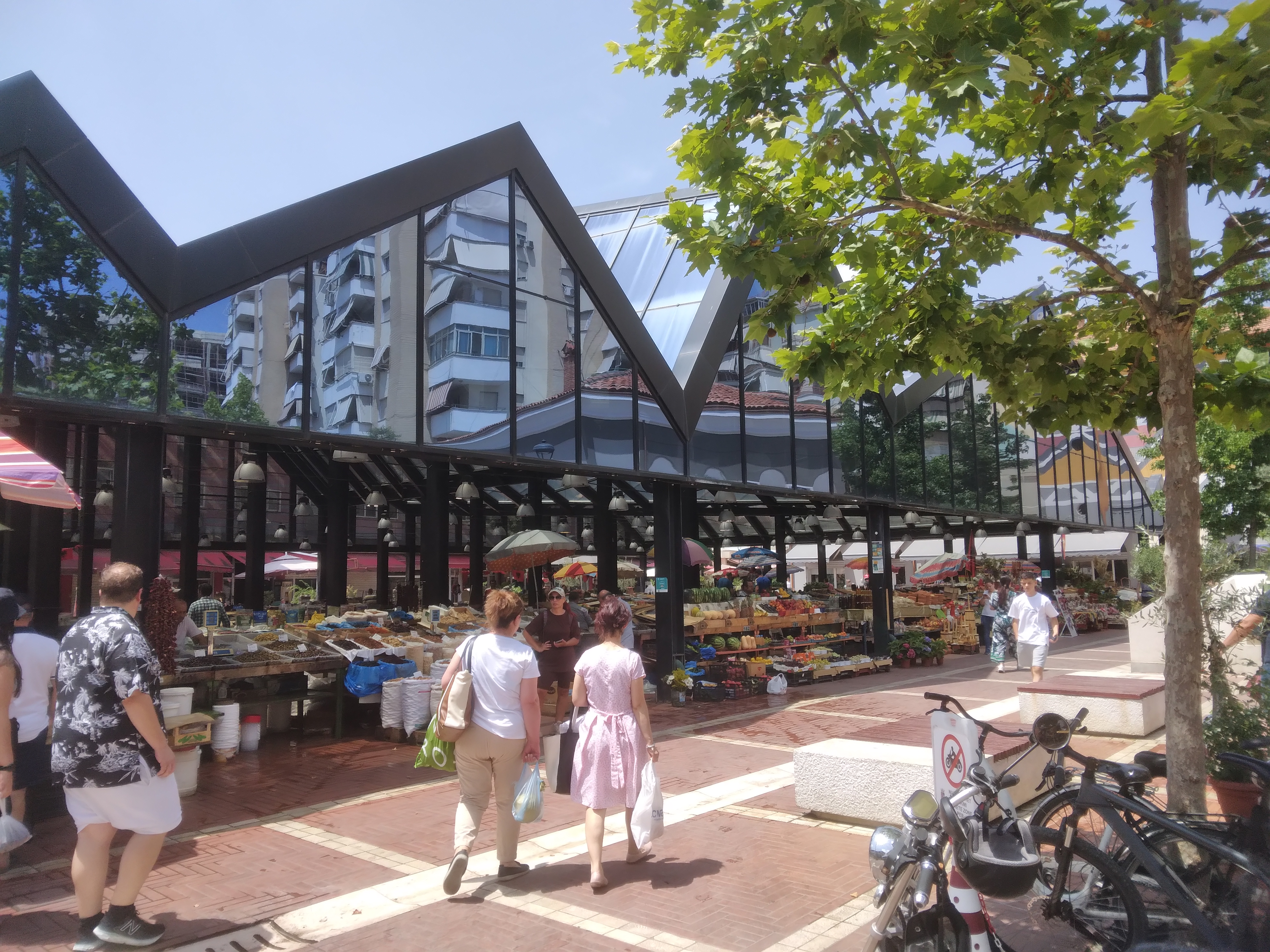
Pazari i Ri, 2022
