= Mujos =

Neighbourhood of Tirana, Albania

Mujos is a neighbourhood of Tirana, Albania. Along with Pazari it forms part of the Old Town of Tirana and is one of the oldest areas of the city. It is located east of the central boulevard.
