= Kastriot Islami =

Albanian politician (born 1952)

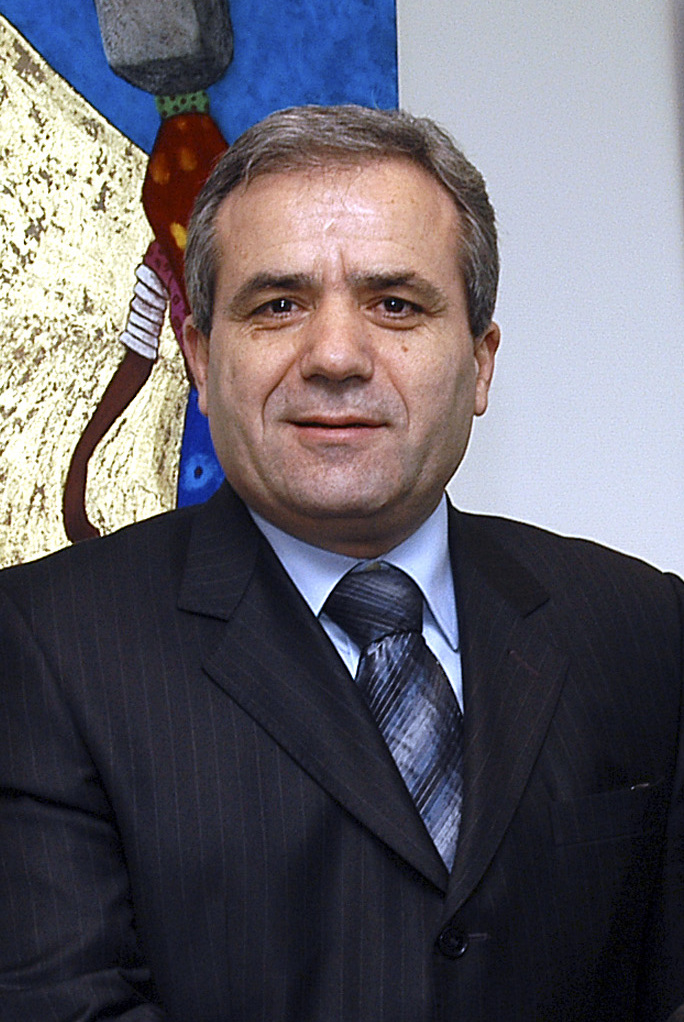

30th Speaker of the Parliament of Albania
- In office 17 April 1991 – 6 April 1992
- Preceded by: Petro Dode
- Succeeded by: Pjetër Arbnori

61st Minister of Foreign Affairs
- In office 29 December 2003 – 12 September 2005
- Prime Minister: Fatos Nano
- Preceded by: Luan Hajdaraga (Acting)
- Succeeded by: Besnik Mustafaj

Personal details
- Born: 18 August 1952 (age 74) Tirana, Albania
- Party: Democratic Party; Socialist Party

Kastriot Muhamet Islami (born 18 August 1952) is an Albanian politician. Formerly a member of the Communist Party of Albania, turned moderate Socialist. He was Chairman of the Parliament of Albania from April 17, 1991 to April 6, 1992. On April 3, 1992, when the last communist president, Ramiz Alia resigned, Islami served as acting president for three days. During the presidency of Sali Berisha (1992–1997), Islami had no important positions in the government, but from 1997 to 2005 he was an important person in the government again holding several Ministerial positions in the Socialist "NANO government". Most prominently he was foreign minister from 2003 to 2005, but lost his position in the cabinet when a new government was formed with Berisha as prime minister after the 2005 elections. He returned to Democratic Party on 7 May 2013 after he left the Socialist Party in March.

Islami has held the positions of:

- Member of the Parliament of Albania (1991–present);
- Minister of Education (1991);
- Chairman of the Parliament of Albania (1991–1992);
- Minister of State (1997–1998);
- Deputy Prime Minister (April 1998 – October 1998);
- Minister of Finance (February 2002 – December 2003);
- 60th Minister of Foreign Affairs (December 12, 2003 – September 11, 2005).
