= Arben Malaj =

Albanian politician (born 1961)

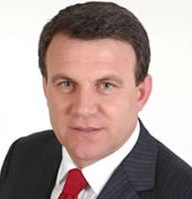

Minister of Finance and Economy of Albania 1997 - 2005

Personal details
- Born: 19 September 1961 (age 65) Vlorë, Albania
- Party: Socialist Party
- Spouse: Raimonda Malaj
- Education: University of Tirana, Harvard Kennedy School of Government
- Profession: Economist

Arben Malaj (born 19 September 1961) has been Minister of Finance and Economy in the Republic of Albania different times from 1997 until 2005. He is known for transforming the Albanian economy into a European profile, after the hard social-economic crisis that this country passed during the year 1997. He served as a Member of the Albanian Parliament from 1997 to 2013 chairing the Parliamentary Committee on Economy and Finance.

Since 2016 Malaj serves as Member of the Supervisory Council of the Bank of Albania and is Honorary President of the Institute for Public Policy and Good Governance, a think-tank he co-founded in 2013. Prof. Malaj is the author of several economics studies and has mentored many doctoral candidates on topics related to local and global financial developments. He has also published several scientific publications.

== Early life and professional career ==
Malaj was born in Vlorë, a city in the south seaside of Albania. Deriving from a simple family, Arben was the fifth from his nine brothers and sisters. Despite much difficulty, he achieved notable scientific progress in comparison with his companions of the school gaining so the right of study, and he was financially supported by his brothers to follow the university studies for Economics at the University of Tirana, graduating in 1986 in Finance profile. Finishing university with distinguished results, he was appointed as the National Commercial Bank – Financial Representative for the Vlora branch. He held this function until 1992, year when his professional capacity was promoted in the position of executive director for the National Bank of Albania in the southern region. The high performance led him in SME, Tirana Regional Director for the EU PHARE Program where Malaj's qualitative standards signed a new success for his career. For two years afterward, in the period 1996-1997 he initiated a professional studio, offering Economic Advisor. In 1997 the position of Albania Governor for the World Bank was consigned to him.

== Political profile ==
Malaj began his political life as a simple member of the Socialist Party, until his first official race when he represented Socialist Party in the local elections of 1992 for the position of Vlora City Mayor. Because of the manipulation, this first challenge in politics was not concluded in a positive result. Anyway, his contribution for this party was frequent and persistent, until the moment when Malaj became a Member of the Parliament, as a representative of VLORA in 1997 and Minister of Finance in the Government of National Reconciliation for five months (March – July). After that, from July 1997 until September 1998, became Minister of Finance in the Government of the State Alliance. During his first term as Minister of Finance for Albania, the country's economy was facing a very difficult and tend situation because of the Ponzi scheme failure. Shaping and leading an effective network of cooperation between the international financial institutions such as World Bank, International Monetary Fund and the Albanian Government, Malaj succeeded in reconditioning the economy and changing its course towards a European profile. Until 2002 he held different important duties as Head of Parliamentary Group of the Socialist Party, Chairman of the Parliamentary Committee for Economy, Finance and Privatization, Head of the Albanian Delegation to the Central European Initiative, Chairman of the Parliamentary Commission and Economic Round table of the Stability Pact, Chairman of the Albanian Inter-Parliamentary Delegation to European Parliament and Governor of the EBRDT and IDB Albania. From August 2002 until December 2003 to Malaj was relied the duty as Minister of the Economy and from December 2003 until September 2005 again the Ministry of Finance. In June 2005, the Socialist Party lost the elections and allowed a peaceful rotation of the power to the opposite. From 2005 until now he is Member of Parliament of the Albanian Parliament, Deputy Chairman of the Parliamentary Commission for Finance and Economy and a Member of the Socialist Party Presidency. After the subsequent loss of the elections in 2009 from Socialist Party, he presented a new vision for the future of the party aiming also the leadership of it.

== Personal life ==
Arben Malaj is married to Raimonda Malaj, an economist, and the couple has a daughter, Gerta. Malaj is fluent in English, and basic Italian.

== Academic life ==
His academic career has begun since 1993, time when Malaj started to lead lections in the Faculty of Economics, University of Tirana. In 1997 Malaj got the title Doctor of Economic Sciences Ph.D. with his study on "The Role of Financial Intermediaries in the Market Economy". In 2002 he was titled associate professor of Faculty of Economics in the University of Tirana. From 2002 until 2007 has been a Member of the Senate for this university. In 2005 Malaj gained a Senior Fellowship to attend the Governmental Program in Harvard University Center for Business and Government. John F. Kennedy School of Government. In April 2007 he accomplished a Course for NATO and EU Enlargement organized by European Center for Security. George C. Marshall Center Germany.

== Lectures and presentations ==
March 2009 “International Leadership Conference – Building a world of Peace” Seoul, South Korea
February 2007 "Learning from mistakes", History of pyramid schemes in Albania. Boston Law School, Boston University
May 1, 2006 "Challenges of European Integration for Western Balkans", Center for Eurasian, Russian and East Europe Studies. Edmund A. Walsh of Foreign Service. Georgetown University
Apr 21, 2006 "Challenges of European Integration Western Balkans" presented at Boston University for Albanian students
March 22, 2006 "Challenges of European Integration Western Balkans", Kokkalis Program. John F. Kennedy School of Government, Harvard University
April 2005 "Fiscal Policy and Economic Development, University of South-Eastern Europe, Tetovo, Macedonia
April 2005 Assessing the economic effects of Albania's efforts towards EU integration "- Submission of the doctoral B. Starter Shahini, Faculty of Economics, University of Tirana
April 2005 "Albania towards development", presentation, Breton Woods Committee, Washington DC
October 2004 "transition in Albania, American University, Washington DC
September 2004 "Integration and Globalization", University of Pristine, Kosovo
November 2003 "Regional aspects of European integration", Friedrich Ebert Stiftung
November 2003 "Knowledge Economy: Challenges of the Future", University of Shkodra
October 2003 "Challenges to European integration of Albania, Vlore University
June 2003 Economic and Investment Opportunities in the U.S. from the perspective of Euro-Atlantic Integration ", presentation, Casa NATO, Bucharest, Romania
March 2003 "Albania towards European integration", Agricultural University of Tirana
2002 "Fiscal Reforms in Albanian tranzicinin, Bamberg University, Germany
May 1998 "Reform of the Albanian banking system", Bocconi University, Italy.

== Honors ==
2017 Honorary President of the Tirana Chamber of Commerce and Industry
2017 Honorary Counsel of Austria in Albania
2016 Albania's Best Economist Award
2009 Man of the Year 2009 in Politics from "Tirana Observer" newspaper
2005 Honorary Citizen, New Orleans, Louisiana, USA
2005 White Band of Global Call Against Poverty donated by OXFAM
2005 Member of the Senate, University of Vlora, Faculty of Economics
2005 Decoration Recognition, University of Vlora
2004 Honorary Citizen of Novosela, Albania
2003 Honorary Citizen of the Sue Ryder Foundation
2003 Honorary Citizen of Kelmend, Albania
2003 Doctor Honorius Cause, International Academy on Emerging Markets, New York

== See also ==
- History of Albania
