= Shaqir Vukaj =

Albanian politician (born 1942)

Minister of Defence
- In office 11 March 1997 – 25 July 1997
- President: Sali Berisha
- Prime Minister: Bashkim Fino
- Preceded by: Safet Zhulali
- Succeeded by: Sabit Brokaj

Personal details
- Born: 20 August 1942 (age 83) Shkodër

Shaqir Vukaj (born 20 August 1942) is an Albanian politician who served as Minister of Defence from 11 March 1997 until 25 July 1997, during the Albanian Unrest of 1997. He replaced Safet Zhulali, who fled to Italy with his family days after resigning.

His short tenure as Defence Minister was not without conflict. Following the sinking of a boat filled with Albanian refugees by the Italian Navy, Vukaj met with Italian Minister of Defence Beniamino Andreatta to discuss the withdrawal of Italian troops from Albania. The Italian military was present in the country as part of Operation Alba, a multinational force mobilized following the Albanian Unrest of 1997. Anger at the sinking of the refugee boat resulted in rebel groups threatening to fire on Italian troops.
