= Safet Zhulali =

Albanian politician (1944–2002)

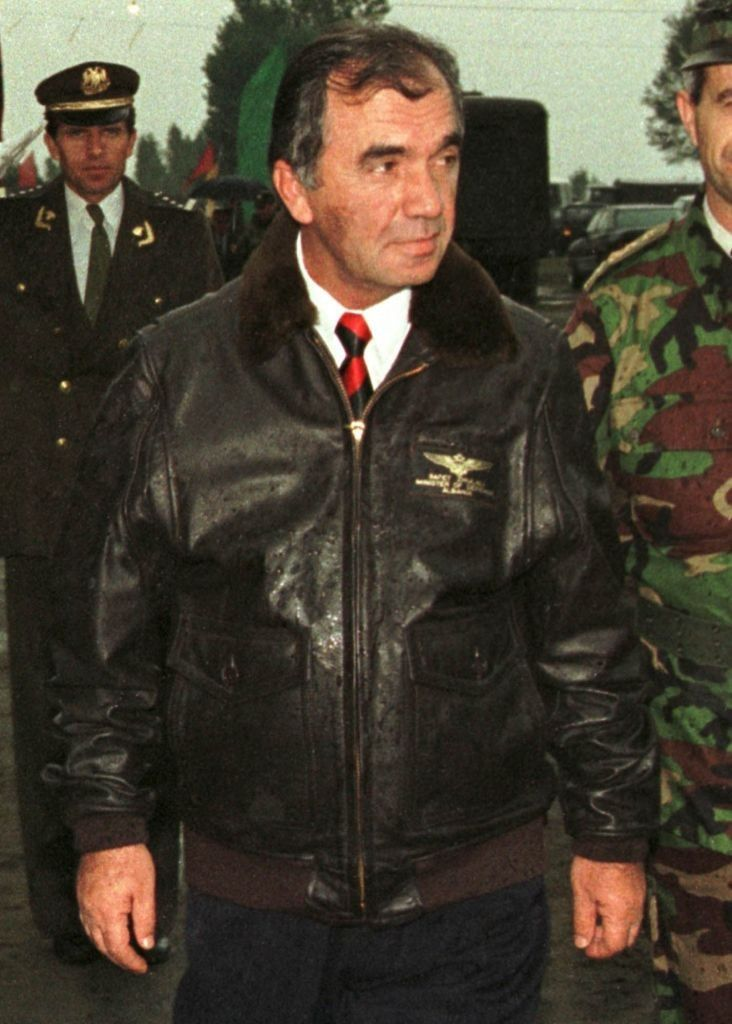

22nd Defence Minister of Albania
- In office 13 April 1992 – 1 March 1997
- President: Sali Berisha
- Prime Minister: Aleksandër Meksi
- Preceded by: Alfred Moisiu
- Succeeded by: Shaqir Vukaj

Personal details
- Born: March 11, 1944 Struga, Albanian Kingdom (1943-1944)
- Died: April 12, 2002 (aged 58) Tirana, Albania
- Party: Democratic Party of Albania
- Spouse: Manushaqe Zhulali
- Children: 3
- Relatives: Aldo Bumçi (son in law)

Safet Zhulali (11 March 1944 – 12 April 2002) was an Albanian politician who served as Defence Minister in the Meksi I & II Governments. He was a member of the Legislative Assembly from 1992 until 1997.

== Early life and education ==
Safet Zhulali was born in Struga, Yugoslavia on March 11, 1944, the son of Shemsi Zhulali from Libohovë and his wife Drita from Gjirokastër, both of whom were teachers by profession. In 1946, the Zhulali family settled in the small north-eastern town of Peshkopi, where Safet attended and completed his primary and secondary education. He graduated in mathematics from the Faculty of Sciences at the University of Tirana in 1970 and shortly thereafter worked as a math teacher, initially in Bellovë (1960–1963) and later in Melan (1966–1967). During the 1970s, Zhulali competed for the local chess team "Korabi" and eventually became the coach of the women's team which he led to a state title in 1988.

== Political career ==
In 1991, Zhulali co-founded and was chairman of the democratic party in Peshkopi. The following year, he was elected as deputy of the People's Assembly, representing Dibër and on April 13 was appointed Minister of Defence in the Meksi I Government. He was re-elected deputy of the Assembly for a second term and resumed his post as Minister of Defence until March 1 when he resigned from office following the collapse of the government. Four days later, Zhulali and his family fled to Italy . On August 22, 1998, he was arrested and charged with crimes against humanity for his role during the 1997 civil unrest. After spending a few weeks in jail, he was exonerated and the charges against him were dropped.

During his tenure, Zhulali institutionalized Albania's relations with Euro-Atlantic structures and filed the country's application for NATO membership. He was present for the signing of a military agreement between Albania and the United States on October 21, 1993, the first agreement of its kind between the US and a country of the former Eastern Bloc.

He died on April 13, 2002, leaving behind his wife and three daughters.

== Recognition ==
- The President of the Republic Sali Berisha awarded Zhulali with the "Order of Freedom, Class I" with the motivation: "For high patriotic merits in securing freedom and for outstanding services in the reform of the army."
- On November 22, 2006, the Municipal Council of Peshkopi declared Safet Zhulali "Honorary Citizen" with the motivation: "Citizen, teacher, sportsman, exemplary intellectual, founder of political pluralism in the district of Dibër, protagonist of Albania's integration into NATO”. The street that leads to the town gymnasium was named in his honor.
- In August 2008, marking the 100th anniversary of the opening of the first Albanian school in the town of Libohovë, Zhulali was awarded with the title "Honorary Citizen" with the motivation: "For outstanding and valuable assistance in the field of education and training of the younger generations”.
- In December 2009 he was awarded by the Minister of Defence Arben Imami the "Medal of Gratitude" with the motivation: "For outstanding contributions as the first Minister of Defence in the period of democratic changes in the country, in the reforms, restructuring and modernization of the Armed Forces".
