= Ilir Hoxha =

Albanian communist

Ilir Enver Hoxha
- Born: 31 March 1949 (age 77); Tirana, PR Albania
- Occupations: Politician, businessman
- Political party: Party of Labour of Albania
- Spouse: Teuta Hoxha
- Children: Besmir; Ermal; Shkelzen
- Parents: Enver Hoxha (father); Nexhmije Xhuglini (mother)
- Relatives: Hysen Hoxha (great uncle)

Ilir Hoxha (born 31 March 1949) is one of the sons of former Albanian leader Enver Hoxha. Ilir was imprisoned in 1995, but was released in 1996. Ilir has been called in to testify several times in an attempt to disclose secrets from the previous socialist era. Ilir wrote a memoir in 1995 called "My Father, Enver Hoxha". The article recounts Ilir's memories of his father's death, the impact it had on the family, his mother's struggles, and also the investigation and prosecution that was conducted on him after his father's death.

During the 2005 election campaign in Albania, Ilir campaigned for candidates of the Party of Labour of Albania.
