= Halit Shamata =

Albanian author and politician

45th Interior Minister of Albania
- In office 1 July 1996 – 1 March 1997
- Prime Minister: Aleksandër Meksi
- Preceded by: Agron Musaraj
- Succeeded by: Belul Çelo

Personal details
- Born: November 30, 1953 (age 72) Kavajë, Albania

Halit Shamata (born 28 August 1954 in Kavajë) is an Albanian author and politician who formerly served as Albania's Minister of Interior and later Deputy Minister of Education.

== Political career ==
- Deputy Minister of Education and Science (2005–2013)
- Interior Minister (1996–1997)
- Member of the Albanian Parliament (1992–1997)

== Books ==
- Viti i brishtë, roman, 2009
- Punë Dore, poezi, 2006.
- Dy dorëshkrime, roman, 2004.
- Dyer të paputhitura, roman, 2001.
- 99 paradokse, poezi, 1999.
- Moshë e pakohë, poezi, 1997.
- Tatuazh, poezi, 1995
- Autograf, poezi, 1990.
