= Kokonozi Mosque =

Mosque in Tirana, Albania

- Xhamia e Mahmut Agë Kokonozit
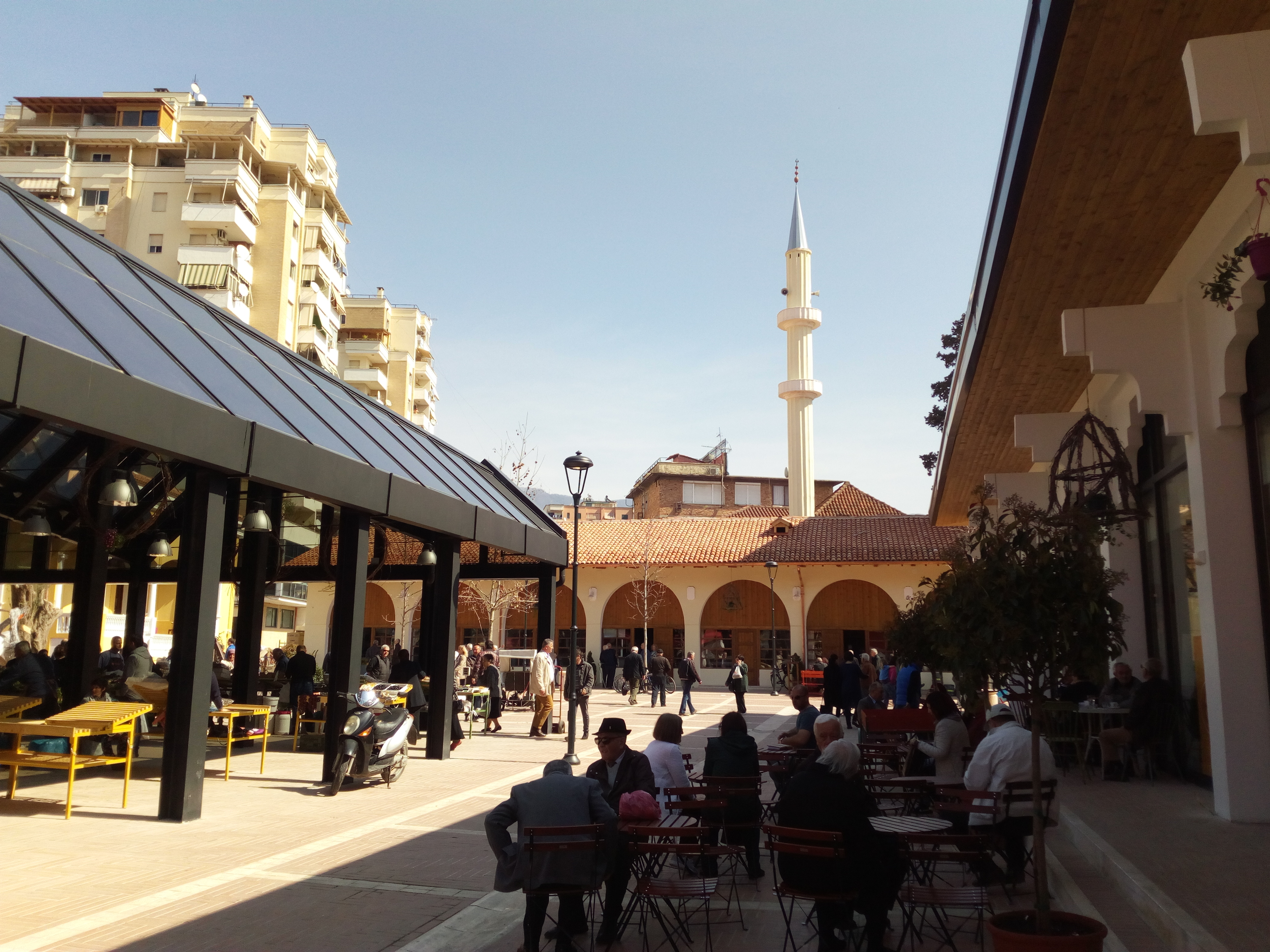
- The mosque in 2017

- Location of the mosque in Albania

Religion
- Affiliation: Sunni Islam
- Ecclesiastical or organizational status: Mosque: (1750–1966); (since 1991– )
- Status: Active

Location
- Location: Tirana, Central Albania
- Country: Albania
- Interactive map of Kokonozi Mosque
- Coordinates: 41°19′48.5″N 19°49′30″E

Architecture
- Type: Islamic architecture
- Style: Ottoman
- Completed: 1750 CE

Website
- xhamiakokonozit.com

The Kokonozi Mosque, officially the Mosque of Mahmud Agha Kokonozi (Albanian: Xhamia e Mahmut Agë Kokonozit), also known as the New Bazaar Mosque (Albanian: Xhamia e Pazarit të Ri), is a mosque in Tirana, Albania. It is an Ottoman-era mosque built in 1750 CE and one of the few mosques that survived the Communist dictatorship under the Hoxhaist regime. The mosque's official name is derived from the Ottoman-era title of Agha.

In 1966, the Kokonozi Mosque was closed and transformed into a food storehouse, and later it was used as a tobacco store. The Kokonozi Mosque was reopened on 18 February 1991.

== See also ==
- Islam in Albania
- List of mosques in Albania
