= Strategy for the Western Balkans =

Policy pursued by the EU in the western region of the Balkan Peninsula

European Union member states States that have withdrawn from the European Union Recognized candidate countries Recognised by the EU as potential candidate countries States that have withdrawn or interrupted their candidacies

The Strategy for the Western Balkans (also known as "A credible enlargement perspective for and enhanced EU engagement with the Western Balkans") is a policy pursued by the EU with its partners and accession candidates in the western region of the Balkan Peninsula. Announced by European Commission President Jean-Claude Juncker in his 2017 State of the Union address, this policy brings together the objectives of the global strategy for CSDP and the enlargement policy specific to the states in this region.

== History ==
In 1999, the European Union launched the Stabilization and Association Process (SAP) to strengthen its role in the region and provide long-term support for the reconstruction and development of countries in the wake of the wars in the former Yugoslavia. At an international level, this approach was accompanied by the Stability Pact for South-Eastern Europe, supported by the EU, NATO, the OSCE, the IMF, the World Bank and other major international players. Since then, an annual EU-Balkans summit has been organized; the first was held in Zagreb in November 2000, and in 2003 the Thessaloniki European Council reaffirmed that all SAP countries were potential candidates for membership.

In 2018, this regional sub-group comprised five of the six candidate states (Albania, Bosnia and Herzegovina, North Macedonia, Montenegro and Serbia) and Kosovo, which only has the status of a potential candidate. Each of these states has signed a Stabilization and Association Agreement with the EU to facilitate their approximation to EU standards (Copenhagen criteria and eventual acquis communautaire).

To support and reinvigorate the candidate countries' efforts to meet the accession criteria, the European Commission, through its President, adopted a strategy at the end of 2017 focusing on priorities and areas for enhanced joint cooperation. The strategy detailed by Jean-Claude Juncker in his State of the Union address in September 2017 and prepared in advance by the Commission and EEAS includes an action plan focusing on six initiatives relating to the EU's strategy in the Balkans with an increased budget allocated to pre-accession instruments and regional initiatives.

According to the President of the European Commission: "If we want more stability in our neighborhood, we must offer credible prospects to the countries of the Western Balkans"; he also added that "there will be no further accessions during the term of office of this Commission" (2014-2019). Beyond this regional policy, the EU is also committed to working alongside its member states and partners to resolve local issues such as the debate over the name of Macedonia, or the dispute over the delineation of the border between Kosovo and Serbia.

=== Specific features of the region ===
Territorial entities when Yugoslavia broke up in 1991.

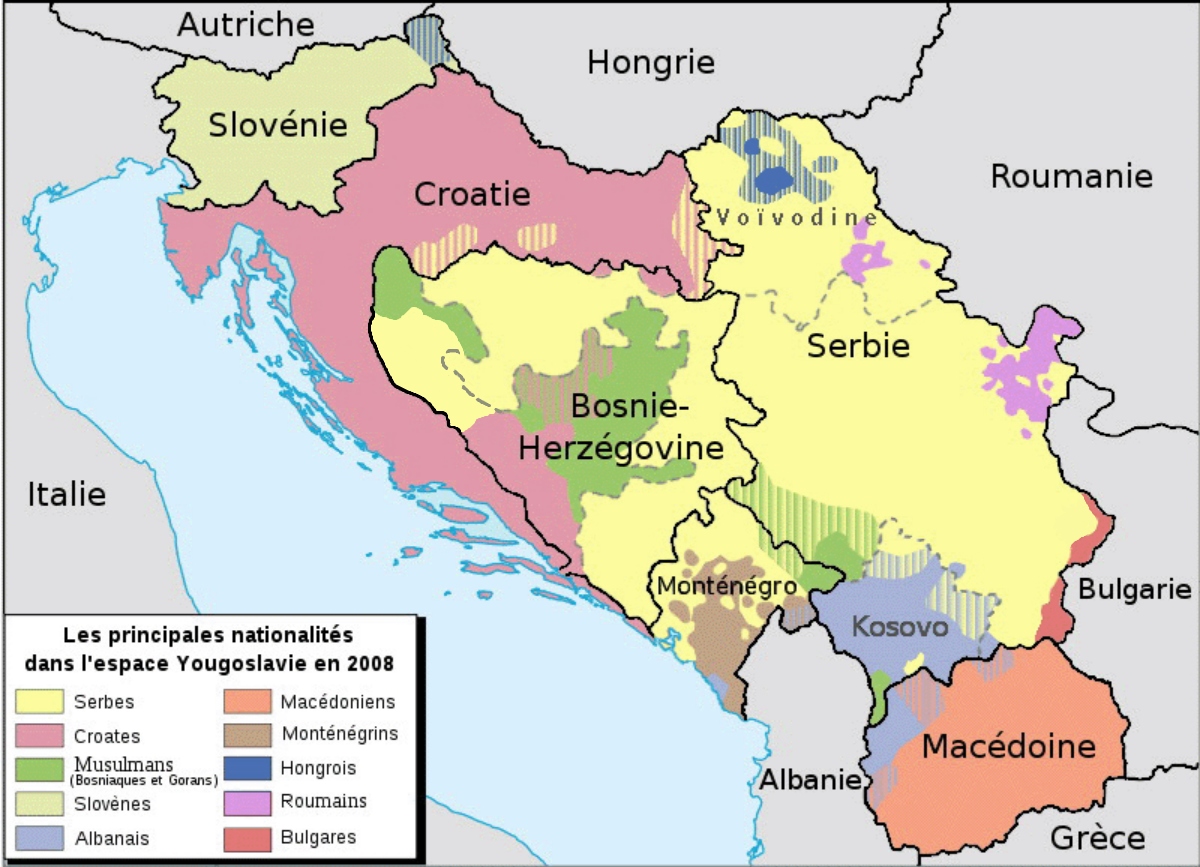
Ethnic distribution of populations in the Western Balkans in 2008.

With the redefinition of borders and forced population movements that followed the inter-ethnic conflicts of the 1990s in the former Yugoslavia, the Western Balkans were sharply divided, and deep-rooted tensions remained. The Dayton Accords put an end to the war in Bosnia (1995) by separating the country into two distinct regions and creating a federal government managed by a collective tripartite presidency and supervised by an international High Representative. The agreements also provided for the intervention of a NATO intervention force (IFOR), which was replaced by the European Union's Althea force in 2004. Kosovo became independent in 2008, at the cost of a mass exodus of Albanian and Serbian populations. Here too, a NATO force was set up (KFOR), supported by an administration mission that was replaced by the European Union's civilian mission EULEX Kosovo.

Since the fall of Yugoslavia and the end of the Communist regime, economic development in the Balkans has lagged significantly behind that of other regions in Eastern Europe; for example, in 1990, North Macedonia's GDP was three times lower than Slovenia's; in 2003, it was fifty times lower. This lack of development has led to an expansion of a black market and illegal activities in the region.

Demographic trends in the Balkans are also specific: the number of inhabitants is declining for two main reasons: the fertility rate is below 1 child per woman (compared with 1.4 on average in Europe - well below the generational renewal rate of 2.1), and with significant income and development gaps compared with the rest of Europe, a massive exodus (particularly of young people) is taking place; North Macedonia is said to have lost almost a quarter of its population in twenty-five years; Serbia lost 160,000 people between 2002 and 2011, and the Serbian National Statistics Office estimates that the country could have fewer than 6 million inhabitants in 2030, compared with 7.7 in 2016. Bosnia-Herzegovina has also been hard hit by the phenomenon, with an estimated 170,000 departures over the past five years.

For High Representative Federica Mogherini: "The Western Balkans are part of Europe: we share the same history, the same geography, the same cultural heritage, as well as the same opportunities and challenges today and in the future [...] This strategy shows the path we must follow: for all our six partners, overcoming the past once and for all, and for all of us, making the process of bringing the Western Balkans closer to the European Union an irreversible one, and continuing to reunite the continent".

== Goals ==
Through six main initiatives, this strategy aims to support the transformation of the Western Balkans so that the countries concerned meet the values of the European Union and, in the longer term, are able to achieve the convergence criteria:

- The rule of law: with individual and detailed action plans for compliance with EU standards and special monitoring for candidate countries; including the deployment of new advisory missions.
- Security and migration control: with reinforced cooperation in the fight against organized crime and terrorism, as well as the strengthening of border control and migrant management, and increased cooperation with the Frontex agency.
- Socio-economic development: this includes a range of mechanisms designed to facilitate the financing of SMEs, research and innovation. The EU also supports economic reform programs focusing on employment, social reform, education and health. Erasmus+ funding will be doubled.
- Transport and energy connectivity: in particular to secure supplies to and from the Balkans. The Energy Union should be extended to the Western Balkans.
- Digital strategy: this covers concrete areas such as reducing roaming costs, supporting broadband deployment, developing online public services, etc.;
- Regional reconciliation and good neighborly relations: this aims to improve cooperation in the fields of justice, education, culture, youth and sports, so that the region's tumultuous past can be put to rest.

The strategy also sets out the steps to be taken by Montenegro and Serbia to complete their accession processes, with the aim of meeting the Copenhagen criteria by 2025.

== EU-Western Balkans Summit ==
An EU-Western Balkans Summit is a meeting between leaders from European Union member states and partner states in the Western Balkans.

Overview of EU-Western Balkans Summit meetings
Number	Date	Host country	Host city
-	24 November 2000	Croatia	Zagreb
-	21 June 2003	Greece	Thessaloniki
1st	17 May 2018	Bulgaria	Sofia
2nd	6 May 2020	Croatia	Zagreb
3rd	6 October 2021	Slovenia	Brdo pri Kranju
4th	6 December 2022	Albania	Tirana
5th	13 December 2023	Belgium	Brussels
6th	18 December 2024	Belgium	Brussels
7th	17 December 2025	Belgium	Brussels
8th	5 June 2026	Montenegro	Tivat

== Resources ==
The European Parliament is responsible for managing the budget allocated to this policy under the pre-accession instruments, which comprised 9 billion euros over the period 2007-2017, and would rise to 1.07 billion euros for 2018 alone for the Western Balkans region, and is set to increase further year by year until 2020. The main program is IPA II, which forms the financial basis of the new strategy; for the 2014-2020 period, a budget of 11.7 billion euros has been voted for this pre-accession instrument alone, which is managed in line with the objectives of the European institutions and the monitoring reports drawn up by the European Commission. A similar succeeding IPA III program is currently in place for the 2021-2027 period.

Monitoring of the use of aid is carried out by the European Parliament Committee on Foreign Affairs, which appoints permanent rapporteurs for all candidate and potential candidate countries; the Parliament expresses its positions in annual reports on each country.

The European Commission also points out that the Union is the leading investor and trading partner in the region, with a total annual volume of trade amounting to 43 billion euros (2016).

=== The Brdo-Brijuni and Berlin processes ===
The Brdo-Brijuni Process is a diplomatic initiative launched by Croatia and Slovenia in 2013 with the aim of working together to stabilize the region and accelerate the EU accession processes of the countries in the Western Balkans region.

The Berlin Process was launched by Germany in 2014, along with a number of other EU countries and all the Western Balkan states; although it is not directly overseen by European bodies, some of the objectives are similar (mainly regional cooperation and development of the region's infrastructure and economy), and funding is provided by European and external bodies (European Bank for Reconstruction and Development (EBRD) and European Investment Bank (EIB)).

Applications for accession to the European Union (Note: Applications to the European Coal and Steel Community, European Communities and European Union depending on date.)
Applicant	Submitted	Accession / failure rationale
Albania	28 April 2009	Negotiating
Austria	17 July 1989	1 January 1995
Belgium	Founder	23 July 1952
Bosnia and Herzegovina	15 February 2016	Candidate
Bulgaria	14 December 1995	1 January 2007
Croatia	21 February 2003	1 July 2013
Cyprus	3 July 1990	1 May 2004
Czech Republic	17 January 1996	1 May 2004
Denmark	10 August 1961	(Note: Due to veto of UK application.)Withdrawn
Denmark	11 May 1967	1 January 1973
Estonia	24 November 1995	1 May 2004
Finland	18 March 1992	1 January 1995
France	Founder	23 July 1952
(Georgia (country)) Georgia	3 March 2022	Applicant
West Germany (Note: On 3 October 1990, East Germany joined West Germany through the process of German reunification; since then, the reunited Germany has been a single member state.)	Founder	23 July 1952
Greece	12 June 1975	1 January 1981
Hungary	31 March 1994	1 May 2004
Iceland	17 July 2009	(Note: Due to the election of new government.) Frozen
(Republic of Ireland) Ireland	31 July 1961	(Note: Due to veto of UK application.)Withdrawn
(Republic of Ireland) Ireland	11 May 1967	1 January 1973
Italy	Founder	23 July 1952
Kosovo	14 December 2022	Applicant
Latvia	13 September 1995	1 May 2004
Lithuania	8 December 1995	1 May 2004
Luxembourg	Founder	23 July 1952
Malta	16 July 1990	(Note: Due to election of new government in October 1996. Resumed following another election of a new government in September 1998.) Frozen
Malta	16 July 1990	1 May 2004
Moldova	3 March 2022	Candidate
Montenegro	15 December 2008	Negotiating
Morocco	20 July 1987	(Note: By the European Council.) Rejected
Netherlands	Founder	23 July 1952
North Macedonia (Note: Referred to as "the former Yugoslav Republic of Macedonia" by the EU before 2019.)	22 March 2004	Negotiating
Norway	30 April 1962	(Note: Due to veto of UK application.)Withdrawn
Norway	21 July 1967	(Note: By Norway after a referendum.) Withdrawn
Norway	25 November 1992	(Note: By Norway after a referendum.) Withdrawn
Poland	5 April 1994	1 May 2004
Portugal	28 March 1977	1 January 1986
Romania	22 June 1995	1 January 2007
Serbia	22 December 2009	Negotiating
Slovakia	27 June 1995	1 May 2004
Slovenia	10 June 1996	1 May 2004
Spain	9 February 1962	(Note: By the European Council.) Rejected
Spain	28 June 1977	1 January 1986
Sweden	1 July 1991	1 January 1995
Switzerland	25 May 1992	(Note: Due to public opinion.) Withdrawn
Turkey	14 April 1987	Frozen negotiations
Ukraine	28 February 2022	Candidate
United Kingdom	10 August 1961	(Note: By France.)Vetoed
United Kingdom	10 May 1967	1 January 1973

== See also ==
- Yugoslavia–European Communities relations
- Potential enlargement of the European Union
- Accession of Albania to the European Union
- Accession of Bosnia and Herzegovina to the European Union
- Accession of North Macedonia to the European Union
- Accession of Montenegro to the European Union
- Accession of Serbia to the European Union
- EU Strategy for the South Caucasus

== Bibliography ==
- Marwedel, Hanna (2012). Die Stabilisierungs- und Assoziierungsabkommen der EU mit den Staaten des Westlichen Balkans (in German). LIT Verlag. ISBN 978-3-643-11458-7.
- Dinan, Desmond (2010). Ever Closer Union: An Introduction to European Integration. Boulder (Colo.): Lynne Rienner Pub. ISBN 978-1-58826-607-1.
- Memeti-Kamberi, Lendita (2013). L'État candidat à l'Union européenne. Droit, Société et Risque. L'Harmattan. ISBN 978-2-296-51284-9.
- Saurugger, Sabine (2010). Théories et concepts de l'intégration européenne. Références. Presses de Sciences Po. ISBN 978-2-7246-1141-0.
- Lai, Igor (2017). L'Union européenne, médiateur de paix dans les Balkans occidentaux: Processus et suivi de la mise en œuvre des résultats. PAF. ISBN 978-3-8381-8906-2.
- Drouet, Michel (2007). Vers l'élargissement de l'Union européenne à l'Europe du Sud-Est. Des sociétés (in French). Rennes: Presses universitaires de Rennes. ISBN 978-2-7535-0357-1.
