= 2022 EU-Western Balkans summit =

2022 EU–Western Balkans summit 4th EU–Western Balkans summit
- Host country: Albania
- Date: 6 December 2022
- Cities: Tirana
- Chair: Prime Minister Edi Rama
- Follows: 2023 Brussels summit
- Precedes: 2021 Kranj summit
- Website: 2022 EU–Western Balkans summit

The 2022 EU–Western Balkans summit was the fourth edition of the European Union–Western Balkans Summit held on 6 December 2022 in Tirana, Albania. Hosted by the Albanian Prime Minister, Edi Rama, the summit brought together heads of state and government from the Western Balkan nations, including Bosnia and Herzegovina, Kosovo, Montenegro, North Macedonia, and Serbia, alongside other EU representatives. Amid the setting of the ongoing Russo-Ukrainian War, it underscored the union's commitment to strengthening its political, economic, and security cooperation with the region. Among the central themes of the discussions was the union's support for the region's integration, particularly through the alignment of the Western Balkans with EU standards. The Tirana Declaration, one of the summit's key results, reaffirmed the EU's dedication to the region's EU accession process, while highlighting the demand for political and institutional reforms and democratic principles.

== Background ==

The European Union has made a commitment to accept the countries of the Western Balkans as full EU members.

Since the early 2000s, the European Union (EU) has prioritised the political and economic development of the Western Balkans, recognising the region's importance of the region's stability and its eventual integration into the union. The formal accession process for the Western Balkans began with the Stabilisation and Association Process (SAP), which was designed to enhance the region's transition from post-socialist states to stable democratic nations capable of meeting European Union membership criteria. The EU's engagement with the region has been characterised by a series of initiatives and agreements aimed at promoting political and economic reforms, enhancing regional cooperation, and improving the economy, governance, human rights standards and the rule of law. While significant progress has been made by certain countries, others remain at earlier stages of the process. As of 2022, Montenegro and Serbia were granted EU candidate status and were in the midst of accession negotiations. Albania and North Macedonia had also received candidate status, although their progress was contingent upon the resolution of specific issues. Bosnia and Herzegovina had to obtain candidate status, while the partial recognition of Kosovo within the EU continued to complicate its path toward integration.

The fourth edition of the European Union Western Balkans summit convened on 6 December 2022 in Tirana, Albania, marking the inaugural summit to be held outside the borders of the EU. The summit was a key component in advancing the objectives defined in the Strategic Agenda for 2019 to 2024 of the European Council (EC). It brought together representatives from the six Western Balkans countries, including Albania, Bosnia and Herzegovina, Kosovo, Montenegro, North Macedonia, and Serbia, along with notable representatives from the EU member states and other institutions. Held against the backdrop of several geopolitical tensions, particularly in the wake of Russia's invasion of Ukraine, the summit underscored the EU's strategic response to the growing security concerns across Europe and underscored the need for a coordinated response from EU institutions. Meanwhile, the increasing economic and political influence of both China and Russia in the Western Balkans further highlighted the necessity for the EU to intensify its engagement with the region.

== Attendance ==
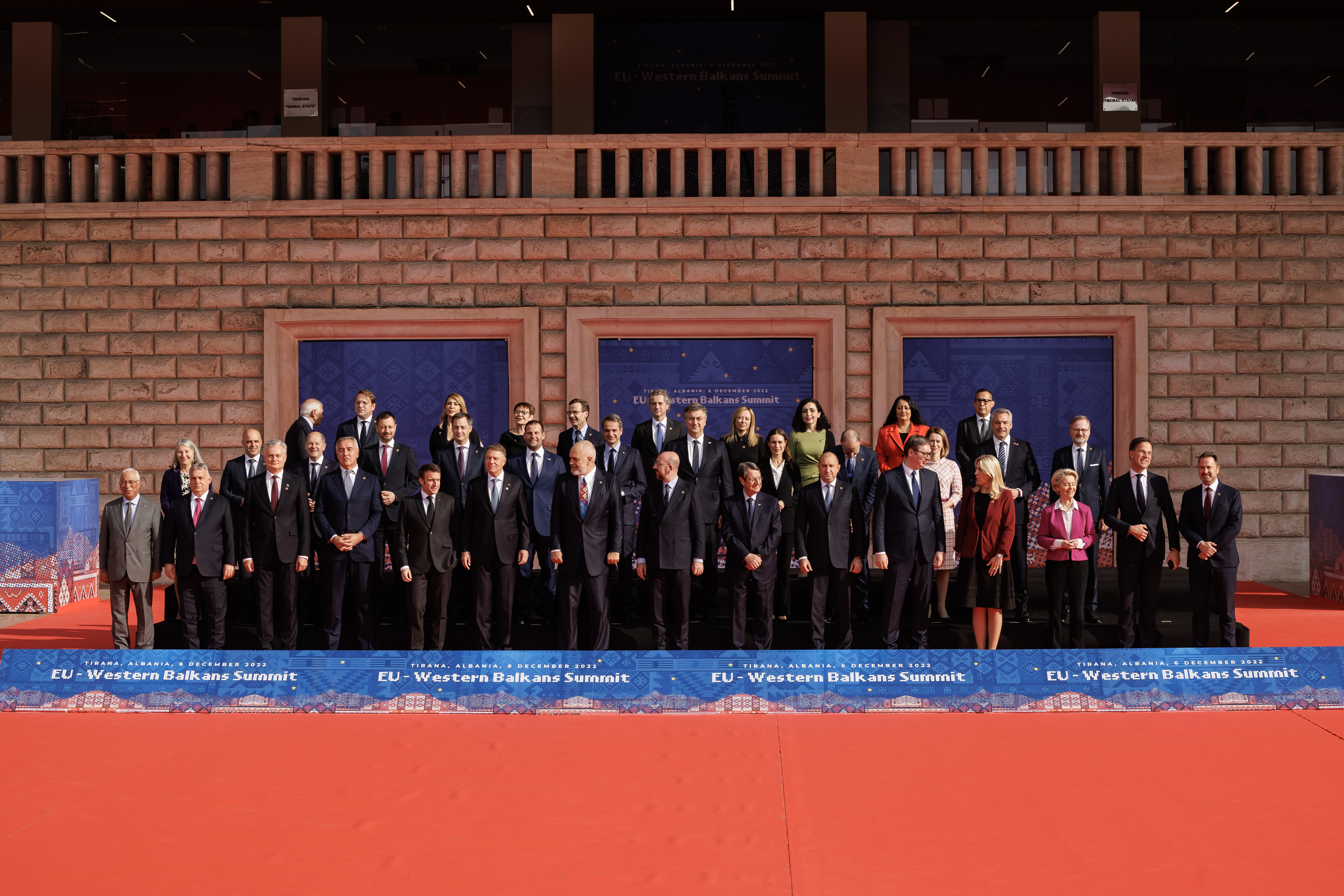
Group photo of the attendees at the 2022 summit in Tirana.

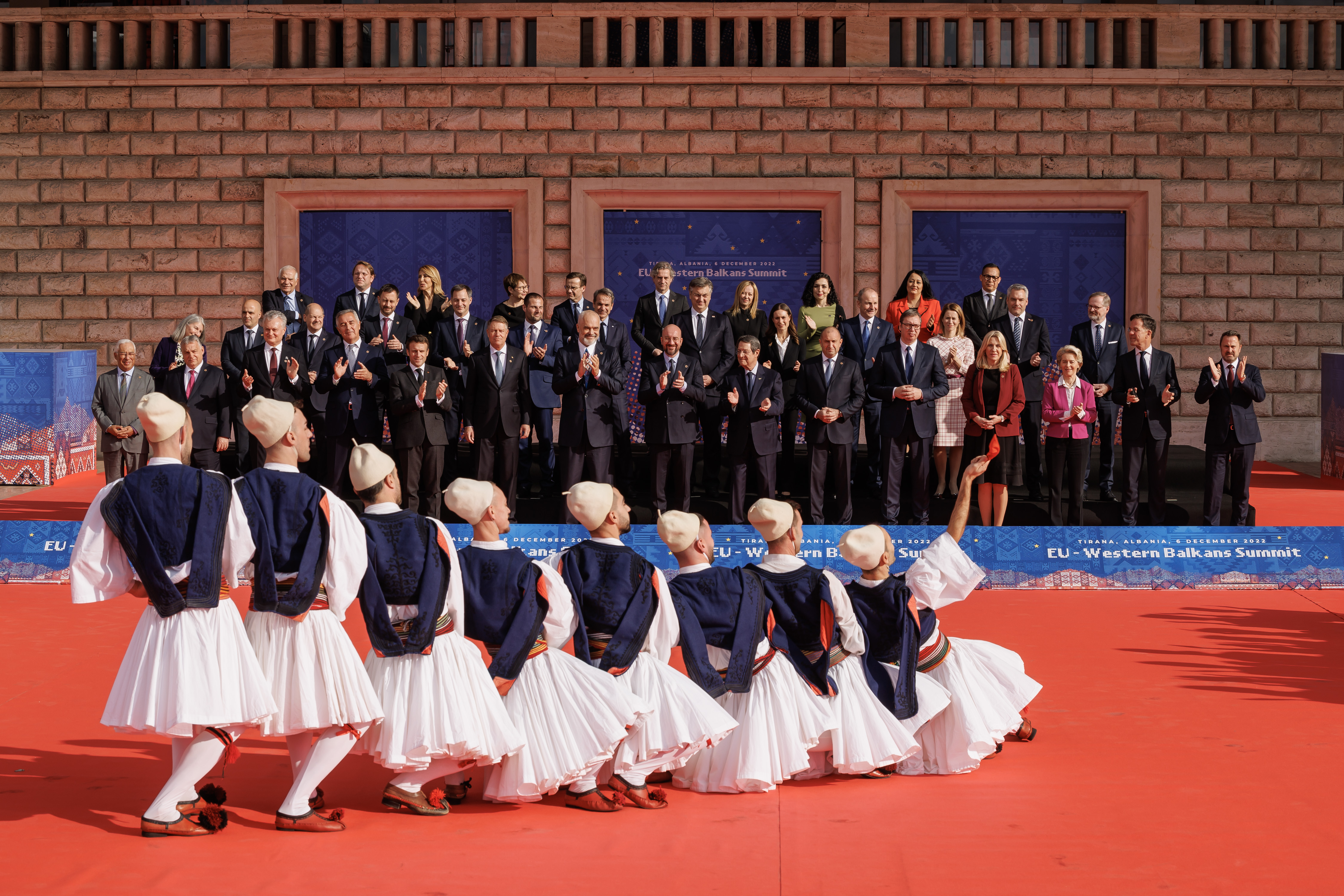
Following the group photo of the summit participants, an Albanian folk ensemble delivered a formal presentation of traditional songs and dances.

The 2022 summit brought together a distinguished group of political leaders from both the European Union and the Western Balkans. Albania, as the host nation, was represented by Prime Minister Edi Rama. He distinguished the summit as a historic critical juncture in the nation's foreign relations, marking the most significant advancement in recent years concerning its engagement with the EU. Rama further recognised that it signified a fundamental shift in the EU's policy towards the region, noting Albania's role in facilitating this transformation. The EU delegation was headed by Charles Michel, President of the European Council, and Ursula von der Leyen, President of the European Commission. Josep Borrell, Vice President of the European Commission, and Olivér Várhelyi, Commissioner for Neighborhood and Enlargement, were also in attendance. Several other EU member figures were also present such as France's President Emmanuel Macron, Germany's Chancellor Olaf Scholz, and Italy's Prime Minister Giorgia Meloni.

Representing the Western Balkans, the summit was attended by figures, including Kosovo's President Vjosa Osmani, Montenegro's President Milo Đukanović, North Macedonia's Prime Minister Dimitar Kovačevski, Serbia's President Aleksandar Vučić as well as Bosnia and Herzegovina's Chairman of the Presidency Željka Cvijanović. Prior to the summit, Vučić announced he would boycott the gathering in protest of Kosovo's appointment of a minister for ethnic groups, a choice that was not supported by Serbia. However, he later reversed his decision, acknowledging that his absence could harm Serbia.

2022 EU–Western Balkans summit
Country		Represented by	Title	Ref.
(Albania)	Albania	Edi Rama	Prime Minister	
(Austria)	Austria	Karl Nehammer	Chancellor	
(Belgium)	Belgium	Alexander De Croo	Prime Minister	
(Bosnia and Herzegovina)	Bosnia and Herzegovina	Željka Cvijanović	President	
(Bulgaria)	Bulgaria	Rumen Radev	President	
(Croatia)	Croatia	Andrej Plenković	Prime Minister	
(Cyprus)	Cyprus	Nicos Anastasiades	President	
(Czech Republic)	Czech Republic	Petr Fiala	Prime Minister	
(Estonia)	Estonia	Kaja Kallas	Prime Minister	
(European Union)	European Union	Charles Michel	President	
(European Union)	European Union	Ursula von der Leyen	President	
(European Union)	European Union	Josep Borrell	Vice President	
(European Union)	European Union	Olivér Várhelyi	Commissioner	
(European Union)	European Union	Thérèse Blanchet	Secretary General	
(Finland)	Finland	Sanna Marin	Prime Minister	
(France)	France	Emmanuel Macron	President	
(Germany)	Germany	Olaf Scholz	Chancellor	
(Greece)	Greece	Kyriakos Mitsotakis	Prime Minister	
(Hungary)	Hungary	Viktor Orbán	Prime Minister	
(Republic of Ireland)	Ireland	Micheál Martin	Prime Minister	
(Italy)	Italy	Giorgia Meloni	Prime Minister	
(Kosovo)	Kosovo	Vjosa Osmani	President	
(Lithuania)	Lithuania	Gitanas Nausėda	President	
(Luxembourg)	Luxembourg	Xavier Bettel	Prime Minister	
(Malta)	Malta	Robert Abela	Prime Minister	
(Montenegro)	Montenegro	Milo Đukanović	President	
(Netherlands)	Netherlands	Mark Rutte	Prime Minister	
(North Macedonia)	North Macedonia	Dimitar Kovačevski	Prime Minister	
(Portugal)	Portugal	António Costa	Prime Minister	
(Romania)	Romania	Klaus Iohannis	President	
(Serbia)	Serbia	Aleksandar Vučić	President	
(Slovakia)	Slovakia	Eduard Heger	Prime Minister	
(Slovenia)	Slovenia	Robert Golob	Prime Minister	
(Sweden)	Sweden	Ulf Kristersson	Prime Minister	

== Summit ==
=== Strengthening Political and Policy Cooperation ===
Engagements between various multinational agreements and organisations of the European Union.

The 2022 summit underscored the ongoing commitment to strengthening political and policy cooperation between the European Union and the Western Balkans. As detailed in the Tirana Declaration, both parties reaffirmed their dedication to regular summits, high-level dialogues, and advancing their shared foreign and security policy agendas. Integral to this is the integration of the region into the union's internal market, with the development of the Common Regional Market (CRM) playing a crucial role in facilitating the free movement of people and the mutual recognition of professional qualifications and university degrees. However, the full realisation of these goals depends on the prompt ratification of agreements and sustained political commitment from the regional leaders. Efforts to align the region with union standards are also reflected in the modernisation of financial and payment systems, particularly through integration into the Single Euro Payments Area (SEPA). The union facilitates youth engagement through platforms such as Erasmus+, European Solidarity Corps (ESC) and European Universities Networks (EUN), aimed at sustaining long-term professional exchanges. Digital integration is another key area, with substantial progress being made in reducing roaming charges through programs including Roam Like at Home (RLAH) and plans to extend these benefits to communications. Furthermore, improvements in border management, notably through the Green and Blue Lanes initiatives, have streamlined trade and travel across the region, expanding connectivity and efficiency.

=== Impacts of Russia-Ukraine War ===
A fundamental result of the Tirana Declaration was the European Union's reaffirmed commitment to assisting the Western Balkans in addressing the economic and political impacts of Russia-Ukraine conflict. Foremost among the discussions was the announcement of a EUR 1 billion Energy Support Package, projected to leverage up to EUR 2.5 billion in investments. The package provides direct assistance to vulnerable households and small and medium-sized enterprises (SMEs), alongside funding for renewable energy projects, energy efficiency measures, and infrastructure improvements. These initiatives aim to reduce the region's reliance on Russian energy supplies through collaborative procurement of gas, and hydrogen, while deepening integration with the union's energy market. In parallel, the EU reiterated its commitment to facilitating the region's economic recovery, notably through the Economic and Investment Plan, which allocates EUR 30 billion in investments. The plan focuses on enhancing infrastructure, connectivity, and energy resilience, with a particular emphasis on transport corridors and cross-border projects. Furthermore, the union underscored its dedication to advancing the green transition of the region, prioritising climate resilience, circular economies, and sustainable resource management in accordance with the Paris Agreement.

=== Security and Defense Cooperation ===
Aligned with the Tirana Declaration, the summit marked a significant step forward in advancing security and defense cooperation between the EU and the Western Balkans, prioritising a coordinated process at both strategic and operational levels. The cooperation is demonstrated by the region's contributions to the Common Security and Defence Policy (CSDP) through its involvement in EU-led crisis management missions. In return, the union will continue to promote the advancement of defense capabilities within the region, particularly through the European Peace Facility (EPF), while also exploring expanded cooperation in military mobility and space policy. Beyond this, both parties are determined to address the growing threat of foreign interference, including disinformation and hybrid threats, which undermine political stability and hinder the region's EU integration. Strengthening resilience against these threats involves initiatives to improve media literacy, promote professionalism in journalism, and enhance the strategic communication of relations and enlargement. In response to recent attacks, the union has favored the Cybersecurity Rapid Response project, which builds on collaboration with the European Union Agency for Cybersecurity (ENISA) as part of a broader effort to provide long-term, region-wide support for cybersecurity.

=== Addressing Migration and Organised Crime ===
The summit underscores the shared priority between the European Union and the Western Balkans on tackling irregular migration, organised crime, and terrorism. The migration crisis, intensified since 2022, has prompted the EU to significantly increase its financial assistance to the region through the Instrument for Pre-Accession Assistance (IPA III), with over EUR 170 million allocated. This funding targets improvements in border security, asylum processes, and efforts to combat migrant smuggling and human trafficking. The union is further committed to expanding these investments, focusing on border management and strengthening return mechanisms as well as the region's capacity to tackle smuggling networks. Central to migration management is the alignment of the regional states with union's visa policies, fundamental for the sustainability of the visa-free regime. The union has called for improved return systems, including the conclusion of readmission agreements and increased collaboration with agencies such as Europol and Frontex. Both parties prioritise preventing violent extremism and curbing terrorist financing, as outlined in the Joint Action Plan on Counter-Terrorism. Concurrently, the fight against organised crime, particularly money laundering, drug trafficking, and high-level corruption, remains a central focus. The union continues to support regional frameworks, notably the region's roadmap for controlling arms and weapons, as well as the cooperation with the European Public Prosecutor's Office (EPPO) to facilitate mutual legal assistance in criminal matters.

== Aftermath ==
The Prime Minister of Finland Sanna Marin attending the 2022 EU-Western Balkans summit.

The 2022 summit testified the shared commitment to expanded cooperation and the persistent challenges that the Western Balkans faces in its integration into the EU. Migration was a defining issue in the proceedings of the summit, with several leaders reinforcing the demand for reinforced border protections and stricter migration policies. Austrian Chancellor Nehammer affirmed the urgency of intensified border security and deportation procedures, particularly along the Balkan route through Bulgaria and Romania. Similarly, Hungarian Prime Minister Orbán underlined the Western Balkans' principal role in regulating migration flows, notably through Serbia, and acknowledged its importance in securing energy supplies for Hungary and Central Europe. Energy security also emerged as another critical concern, with Estonian Prime Minister Kallas, Finnish Prime Minister Marin, and Lithuanian President Nausėda underscoring the strategic obligation for energy diversification, particularly in light of Russia's invasion of Ukraine. Kallas reiterated Estonia's endorsement for broader energy integration, while Nausėda highlighted Lithuania's commitment to building a regional energy market based on renewable resources. Marin further argued for the consolidation of strengthening regional energy ties as part of a broader strategy to enhance both energy resilience and political security.

EU enlargement also dominated the discussions of the summit, with leaders such as Italian Prime Minister Meloni, Romanian President Iohannis, and Portuguese Prime Minister Costa ratifying strict assistance for the integration of the Western Balkans. Meloni advocated for the continuation of negotiations with Albania and North Macedonia, as well as for granting candidate status to Bosnia and Herzegovina. Iohannis reaffirmed Romania's commitment to the enlargement process, while Costa commended the summit's symbolic significance, particularly given its location in Albania. Greek Prime Minister Mitsotakis and Slovak Prime Minister Heger both noted the positive signals sent by hosting the summit in Albania, further affirming the EU's engagement with the region. Maltese Prime Minister Abela similarly welcomed the agreement to reduce roaming tariffs, recognising the importance of rule-of-law reforms underway in the Western Balkans. German Chancellor Scholz underlined the summit's significance for accelerating the region's EU integration. He declared that while the Western Balkans must align more closely with the union's foreign policy, it was essential that enlargement proceed with caution and that governance reforms continue. Contrary, Swedish Prime Minister Kristersson cautioned against enlargement, stressing concerns over corruption, organised crime, and rule-of-law issues in certain Western Balkan nations. He argued that while EU integration remains vital, it must not compromise stability, particularly with regard to security and migration pressures. Concluding with Albanian Prime Minister Rama, he distinguished the summit as a landmark event in Albania's diplomatic history. He stated that it spotlighted the mutual interdependence between the union and the region, with both equally reliant on one another for future stability and cooperation.

== See also ==
- Berlin Process
- Enlargement of the European Union
- Potential enlargement of the European Union
