= Potential accession of Georgia to the European Union =

Ongoing accession process of Georgia to the EU

Process of potential accession of Georgia to the European Union
- Status: Candidate
Application
| European perspective | 23 June 2022 |
| Membership application | 3 March 2022 |
| Screened & negotiations commence |
Negotiations
| Chapters closed |
Memberships & Treaties
Association Agreement
Economic and monetary policy
Travel
Energy
Foreign and military policy
Human rights and international courts
| International Court of Justice (ICJ) |
Impact (27+1)
| Population | 446,828,803 | 450,731,931 |
| Area | 4,233,262 km^{2} 1,634,472 mi^{2} | 4,303,962 km2 |
| HDI | 0.896 |
| GDP (PPP) | $25.399 trillion |
| GDP per capita (PPP) | $56,928 |
| GDP | $17.818 trillion |
| GDP per capita | $39,940 |
| Gini | 30.0 |
| Official Languages | 24 | 25 (+1) (Georgian) |

The potential accession of Georgia to the European Union (EU) is on the agenda for future enlargement of the EU.

Following an application by Georgia in March 2022, the EU established Georgia's eligibility to become a member of the Union, recognizing the country as a potential candidate. On 8 November 2023, the European Commission issued an official recommendation to grant candidate status to Georgia, which was confirmed on 14 December 2023.

On 28 November 2024, Georgian Prime Minister Irakli Kobakhidze announced that Georgia's EU accession negotiations had been suspended until the end of 2028, though he added that his government would continue to implement the reforms required for accession and that it still planned for Georgia to join the EU by 2030.

It is one of nine current EU candidate countries, together with Albania, Bosnia and Herzegovina, Moldova, Montenegro, North Macedonia, Serbia, Turkey and Ukraine; Kosovo, which is claimed by Serbia and not recognised by 5 EU states, applied on 14 December 2022 and is considered a potential candidate by the European Union.

== History ==
The European Union and Georgia have maintained relations since 1992, following an agreement between the former European Community and the newly independent Georgia. In April 1996, Georgia, along with Armenia and Azerbaijan, signed a Partnership and Cooperation Agreement (PCA) with the European Union. On 12 January 2002, the European Parliament noted that Georgia may enter the EU in the future. In 2006, a five-year "Action Plan" of rapprochement was implemented in the context of the European Neighbourhood Policy (ENP). In 2009, relations between the two were further upgraded under the auspices of Eastern Partnership.

In March 2013, the Parliament of Georgia passed a bipartisan resolution supporting the integration into the European Union and NATO. The resolution was drafted jointly by the two largest political parties, Georgian Dream and United National Movement, and was voted by 96 deputies. In 2016, a comprehensive Association Agreement between the EU and Georgia went into force, providing Georgia with visa-free travel to the EU, as well as access to some sectors of the European Single Market. Following Brexit, most of the existing EU-Georgia agreements applicable to the United Kingdom were renegotiated and agreed upon in 2019 bilaterally with the United Kingdom. In January 2021, Georgia was preparing to formally apply for EU membership in 2024. However, on 3 March 2022, Georgia submitted its membership application ahead of schedule, following the Russian invasion of Ukraine. In June 2022, the European Commission established Georgia's eligibility to become a member of the EU, but deferred giving it official candidate status until after certain conditions were met. Later that month, the European Council expressed readiness to grant Georgia the status of a candidate after completing a set of reforms recommended by the commission. On 8 November 2023, the European Commission recommended giving candidate status to Georgia. On 14 December 2023, Georgia was given candidate status by the EU.

Following the Georgian government's approval of legislation which would require non-governmental organizations to register as foreign agents or "organizations carrying the interests of a foreign power" and disclose the sources of their income if the funds they receive from abroad amount to more than 20% of their total revenue, which led to widespread protests in the country, the European Council stated in June 2024 that this represented "backsliding on the steps set out in the Commission's recommendation for candidate status" and that the accession process would be de facto on hold until the government changes course. On 9 July 2024, the EU ambassador in Georgia announced that the European Union had suspended the country's accession process as a result of the legislation. The European Union threatened Georgia with sanctions and suspension of relations if the country becomes a "one-party state" without political opposition following parliamentary elections in October 2024.

The 2024 Georgian parliamentary election resulted in Georgian Dream (GD) retaining power, but was disputed by opposition parties which claimed that the vote was not free and fair and was subject to widespread voter fraud. The European Parliament adopted a non-binding resolution which rejected the validity of the results, and called for the vote to be repeated within a year. On 28 November 2024, Georgian Prime Minister Irakli Kobakhidze announced that Georgia's EU accession negotiations had been suspended until the end of 2028, though he added that his government would continue to implement the reforms required for accession and that it still planned for Georgia to join the EU by 2030. Kobakhidze's statement on suspending the EU accession negotiations triggered a new wave of protests, one of the biggest since Georgia's independence from the Soviet Union. The 2024 Georgian constitutional crisis continued, with Mikheil Kavelashvili being inaugurated by GD as president of Georgia, while Salome Zourabichvili continued to be seen by protestors (and herself) as retaining her legitimacy as president.

== Treaties ==
=== Stabilisation and Association Agreement ===
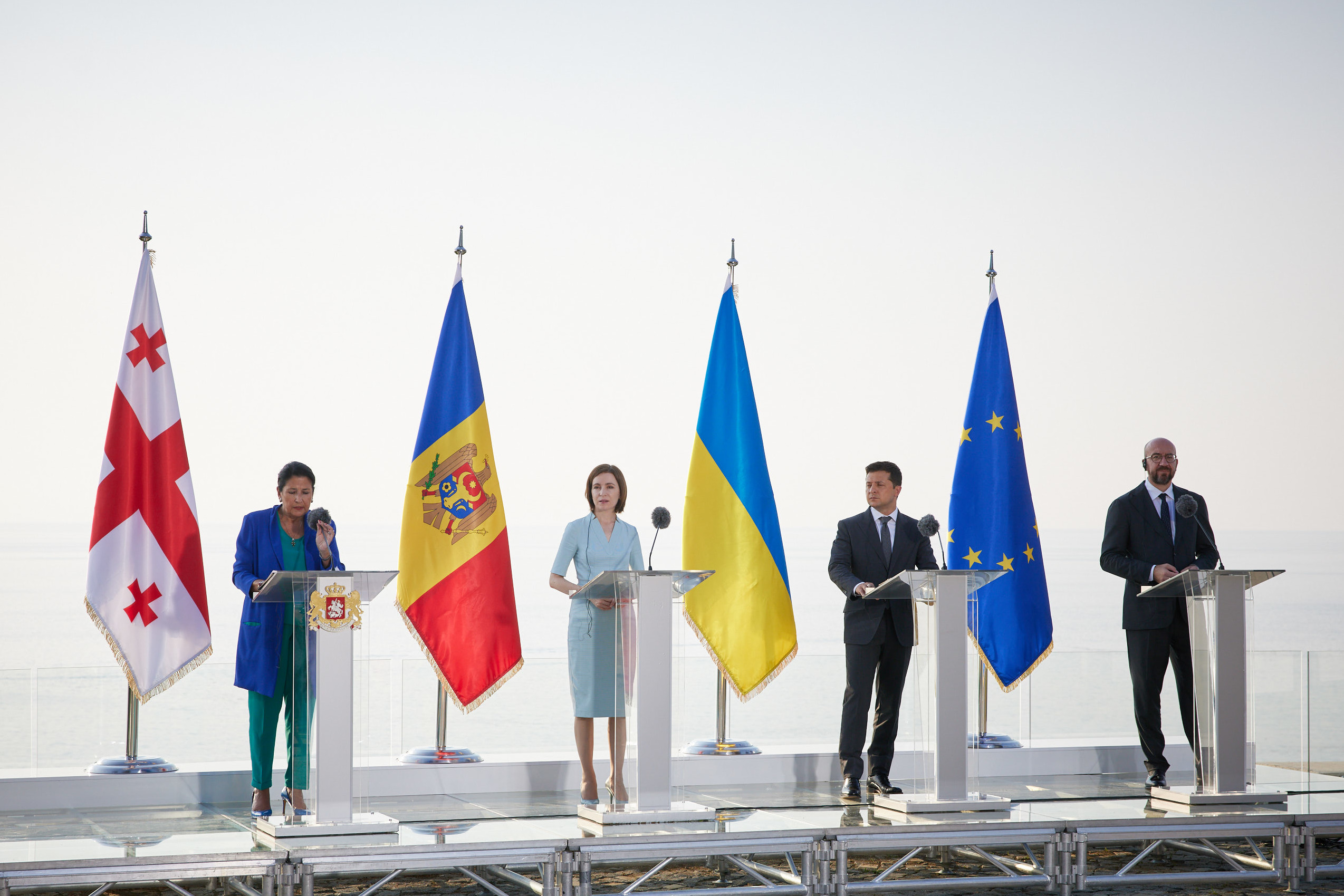
President of Georgia Salome Zourabichvili, President of Moldova Maia Sandu, President of Ukraine Volodymyr Zelenskyy and President of the European Council Charles Michel during the 2021 Batumi International Conference. In 2014, the EU signed Association Agreements with all the three states.

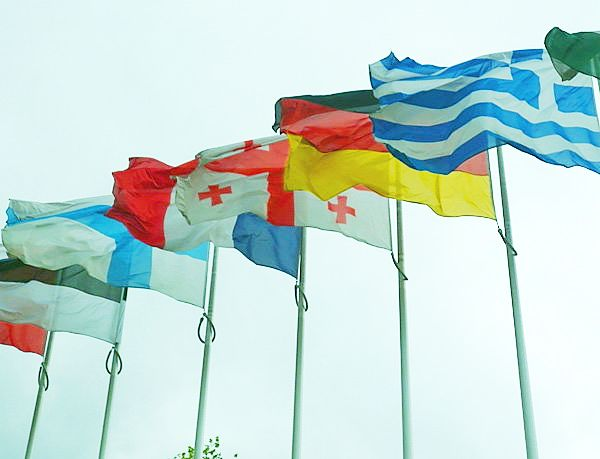
Georgian flag in front of the Council of Europe

To enhance their relationship, the EU and Georgia began negotiating an Association Agreement (AA) and a Deep and Comprehensive Free Trade Agreement. In November 2012, European Commissioner for Neighbourhood and Enlargement Stefan Fule stated that the AA negotiations could be finalized by November 2013. In February 2013, Tamar Beruchachvili, the Deputy State Minister for European and Euro-Atlantic Integration of Georgia, stated that Georgia had no plans to join the Eurasian Economic Union, which Fule has warned Ukraine would be incompatible with the agreements with the EU. A ceremony on the initialling of the AA by the Georgian Foreign Minister Maia Panjikidze and EU High Representative for Foreign Affairs and Security Policy Catherine Ashton was held at the Eastern Partnership summit on 29 November 2013. It was formally signed on 27 June 2014, and had to be ratified by the EU, Euratom, their member states and Georgia. A second agreement, governing the country's involvement in EU crisis management operations, was also signed.

The Association Agreement, much of which provisionally came into force in September, has been fully ratified by Georgia and all EU member states. On 18 December 2014 the European Parliament approved the Association Agreement. Members backed the treaty by 490 votes in favour to 76 against, with 57 abstentions. The agreement entered into force on 1 July 2016.

==== Ratification ====
Ratification history
| Signatory | Date | Institution | In Favour | Against | AB | Deposited | Reference |
|---|---|---|---|---|---|---|---|
| Austria | 8 July 2015 | National Council | Approved | | | 28 August 2015 | |
| Austria | 23 July 2015 | Federal Council | Approved | | | 28 August 2015 | |
| Austria | | Presidential Assent | Granted | | | 28 August 2015 | |
Belgium
| Belgium | 23 April 2015 | Chamber of Representatives | 101 | 17 | 20 | 1 February 2016 | |
| Belgium | | Royal Assent (federal law) | | | | 1 February 2016 | |
| Belgium | 1 July 2015 | Walloon; Parliament / (regional) (community) | 63 | 2 | 4 | 1 February 2016 | |
| Belgium | 1 July 2015 | Walloon; Parliament / (regional) (community) | 61 | 2 | 4 | 1 February 2016 | |
| Belgium | 22 June 2015 | German-speaking Community | 16 | 2 | 1 | 1 February 2016 | |
| Belgium | 24 June 2015 | French Community | 71 | 0 | 8 | 1 February 2016 | |
| Belgium | 20 November 2015 | Brussels Regional Parliament | 69 | 3 | 3 | 1 February 2016 | |
| Belgium | 20 November 2015 | Brussels United; Assembly / (FR language) (NL language) | 53 | 3 | 1 | 1 February 2016 | |
| Belgium | 20 November 2015 | Brussels United; Assembly / (FR language) (NL language) | 14 | 0 | 2 | 1 February 2016 | |
| Belgium | 17 June 2015 | Flemish; Parliament / (regional) (community) | 82 | 18 | | 1 February 2016 | |
| Belgium | 17 June 2015 | Flemish; Parliament / (regional) (community) | 87 | 19 | | 1 February 2016 | |
| Belgium | 24 June 2015 | COCOF Assembly | 71 | 0 | 8 | 1 February 2016 | |
| Bulgaria | 24 July 2014 | National Assembly | 91 | 0 | 0 | 9 September 2014 | |
| Bulgaria | 28 July 2014 | Presidential Assent | Granted | | | 9 September 2014 | |
| Croatia | 12 December 2014 | Parliament | 116 | 0 | 1 | 24 March 2015 | |
| Croatia | 18 December 2014 | Presidential Assent | Granted | | | 24 March 2015 | |
| Cyprus | 7 May 2015 | House of Representatives | Approved | | | 18 August 2015 | |
| Cyprus | 22 May 2015 | Presidential Assent | Granted | | | 18 August 2015 | |
| Czech Republic | 18 March 2015 | Senate | 56 | 0 | 6 | 12 June 2015 | |
| Czech Republic | 29 April 2015 | Chamber of Deputies | 116 | 1 | 51 | 12 June 2015 | |
| Czech Republic | 19 May 2015 | Presidential Assent | Granted | | | 12 June 2015 | |
| Denmark | 18 December 2014 | Parliament | 101 | 7 | 0 | 18 February 2015 | |
| Estonia | 4 November 2014 | Assembly | 66 | 0 | 0 | 12 January 2015 | |
| Estonia | 13 November 2014 | Presidential Assent | Granted | | | 12 January 2015 | |
| European Union and EAEC | 18 December 2014 | European Parliament | 490 | 76 | 57 | 19 April 2016 (EAEC); 23 May 2016 (EU) | |
| European Union and EAEC | | Council of the European Union | | | | 19 April 2016 (EAEC); 23 May 2016 (EU) | |
| Finland | 10 March 2015 | Parliament | Approved | | | 6 May 2015 | |
| Finland | 24 April 2015 | Presidential Assent | Granted | | | 6 May 2015 | |
| France | 29 October 2015 | Senate | Approved | | | 15 December 2015 | |
| France | 25 June 2015 | National Assembly | Approved | | | 15 December 2015 | |
| France | 9 November 2015 | Presidential Assent | Granted | | | 15 December 2015 | |
| Germany | 8 May 2015 | Bundesrat | Approved | | | 22 July 2015 | |
| Germany | 26 March 2015 | Bundestag | Approved | | | 22 July 2015 | |
| Germany | 27 May 2015 | Presidential Assent | Granted | | | 22 July 2015 | |
| (Georgia (country)) Georgia | 18 July 2014 | Parliament | 123 | 0 | 0 | 25 July 2014 | |
| (Georgia (country)) Georgia | | Presidential Assent | Granted | | | 25 July 2014 | |
| Greece | 18 November 2015 | Parliament | Approved | | | 14 December 2015 | |
| Greece | 24 November 2015 | Presidential Promulgation | Granted | | | 14 December 2015 | |
| Hungary | 25 November 2014 | National Assembly | 127 | 6 | 0 | 7 April 2015 | |
| Hungary | 5 December 2014 | Presidential Assent | Granted | | | 7 April 2015 | |
| (Republic of Ireland) Ireland | 27 January 2015 | Dáil Éireann | 58 | 19 | 0 | 17 April 2015 | |
| Italy | 26 November 2015 | Senate | 202 | 37 | 10 | 3 February 2016 | |
| Italy | 29 July 2015 | Chamber of Deputies | 310 | 93 | 34 | 3 February 2016 | |
| Italy | 7 December 2015 | Presidential Assent | Granted | | | 3 February 2016 | |
| Latvia | 14 July 2014 | Parliament | 81 | 0 | 0 | 2 October 2014 | |
| Latvia | 18 July 2014 | Presidential Assent | Granted | | | 2 October 2014 | |
| Lithuania | 8 July 2014 | Parliament | 84 | 0 | 1 | 29 July 2014 | |
| Lithuania | 11 July 2014 | Presidential Assent | Granted | | | 29 July 2014 | |
| Luxembourg | 18 March 2015 | Chamber of Deputies | 55 | 2 | 0 | 12 May 2015 | |
| Luxembourg | 12 April 2015 | Grand Ducal Promulgation | Granted | | | 12 May 2015 | |
| Malta | 21 August 2014 | House of Representatives | Approved | | | 29 August 2014 | |
| Netherlands | 7 July 2015 | Senate | Adopted | | | 21 September 2015 | |
| Netherlands | 7 April 2015 | House of Representatives | 119 | 31 | 0 | 21 September 2015 | |
| Netherlands | 28 July 2015 | Royal Promulgation | Granted | | | 21 September 2015 | |
| Poland | 5 March 2015 | Senate | 75 | 0 | 0 | 22 May 2015 | |
| Poland | 6 February 2015 | Sejm | 439 | 0 | 1 | 22 May 2015 | |
| Poland | 26 March 2015 | Presidential Assent | Granted | | | 22 May 2015 | |
| Portugal | 2 April 2015 | National Assembly | Approved | | | 8 October 2015 | |
| Portugal | 19 May 2015 | Presidential Assent | Granted | | | 8 October 2015 | |
| Romania | 2 July 2014 | Chamber of Deputies | 298 | 0 | 0 | 14 July 2014 | |
| Romania | 3 July 2014 | Senate | 111 | 0 | 2 | 14 July 2014 | |
| Romania | 9 July 2014 | Presidential Assent | Granted | | | 14 July 2014 | |
| Slovakia | 23 September 2014 | National Council | 117 | 0 | 1 | 21 October 2014 | |
| Slovakia | 16 October 2014 | Presidential Assent | Granted | | | 21 October 2014 | |
| Slovenia | 13 May 2015 | National Assembly | 69 | 3 | 0 | 27 July 2015 | |
| Slovenia | 21 May 2015 | Presidential Assent | Granted | | | 27 July 2015 | |
| Spain | 27 May 2015 | Senate | Approved | | | 28 July 2015 | |
| Spain | 30 April 2015 | Congress of Deputies | 303 | 0 | 1 | 28 July 2015 | |
| Spain | | Royal Assent | Granted | | | 28 July 2015 | |
| Sweden | 26 November 2014 | Parliament | 249 | 44 | 0 | 9 January 2015 | |
| United Kingdom | 23 February 2015 | House of Commons | Approved | | | 8 April 2015 | |
| United Kingdom | 9 March 2015 | House of Lords | Approved | | | 8 April 2015 | |
| United Kingdom | 19 March 2015 | Royal Assent | Granted | | | 8 April 2015 | |

=== United Kingdom of Great Britain and Northern Ireland ===
The ratification was based on The European Union (Definition of Treaties) (Association Agreement) (Georgia) Order 2015, made in accordance with section 1(3) of the European Communities Act 1972, after having been approved by a resolution of each House of Parliament.

The agreement applied to the United Kingdom as an EU-member state until Brexit on 31 January 2020. During the transition period that followed Brexit, until 31 December 2020, the agreement still applied to the UK.

==== Free trade area ====
The agreement established a Deep and Comprehensive Free Trade Area (DCFTA) between the EU and Georgia, including "the removal of import duties for most goods traded between the EU and Georgia" and "broad mutual access to trade in services for both partners".

=== Shifts in EU Accession efforts ===
Leading up to May 2025, although Georgia's constitution still mandated EU accession efforts, the Georgian Dream government led by Bidzina Ivanishvili increasingly distanced itself from Western alignment. A key development occurred in April 2024 when the country's State Security Service released an Annual Report accusing Western nations of attempting to destabilize the government through hybrid warfare, civil unrest, and ideological influence. The report, which echoed Russian narratives, claimed foreign powers were behind conspiracies to undermine Georgia's sovereignty, including allegations of U.S. and Ukrainian involvement in coup plots and assassination attempts against Georgian Dream leaders. This rhetoric marked a departure from Georgia's previous pro-Western stance, with the government framing domestic dissent and foreign influence as coordinated efforts against the nation's interests.

== Public opinion ==
A March 2023 survey conducted by the International Republican Institute found that 85% of Georgians (70% 'fully', 15% 'somewhat') were in favour of EU membership, up from 75% before the start of the 2022 Russian invasion of Ukraine. In April 2023, a nationwide poll by the International Republican Institute found that 89 percent of Georgians support joining the EU, the highest number recorded for years.

According to the 2025 annual survey of opinion in Georgia, almost three-quarters of Georgians (74%) would vote for EU membership and only five per cent against if a referendum were held, with 80% saying membership would bring more advantages than disadvantages to the country.

A survey conducted in January–February 2026 on a sample of more than 1.000 people shows that a large majority of Georgians (71%) continue to support Georgia’s accession to the European Union, while a even greater number (79%) believe EU membership would bring more advantages than disadvantages.

| Date | Question | Fully support | Somewhat support | Somewhat oppose | Strongly oppose | Don't know/No answer |
|---|---|---|---|---|---|---|
| September 2022 – IRI | EU membership | 70% | 15% | 3% | 7% | 5% |
| March 2023 – IRI | EU membership | 75% | 14% | 3% | 5% | 3% |

== Negotiations ==
Georgia has not yet started the negotiation process.

Chapter and screening dates
| Progression | 0 / 35 0% complete | 0 / 35 0% complete | 0 / 35 0% complete | 0 / 35 0% complete |
| Acquis chapter | Screening started | Screening completed | Chapter opened | Chapter closed |
|---|---|---|---|---|
| Overview | 0 out of 35 | 0 out of 35 | 0 out of 35 | 0 out of 35 |
| 1. Free Movement of Goods | | | | |
| 2. Freedom of Movement For Workers | | | | |
| 3. Right of Establishment & Freedom To Provide Services | | | | |
| 4. Free Movement of Capital | | | | |
| 5. Public Procurement | | | | |
| 6. Company Law | | | | |
| 7. Intellectual Property Law | | | | |
| 8. Competition Policy | | | | |
| 9. Financial Services | | | | |
| 10. Information Society & Media | | | | |
| 11. Agriculture & Rural Development | | | | |
| 12. Food Safety, Veterinary & Phytosanitary Policy | | | | |
| 13. Fisheries | | | | |
| 14. Transport Policy | | | | |
| 15. Energy | | | | |
| 16. Taxation | | | | |
| 17. Economic & Monetary Policy | | | | |
| 18. Statistics | | | | |
| 19. Social Policy & Employment | | | | |
| 20. Enterprise & Industrial Policy | | | | |
| 21. Trans-European Networks | | | | |
| 22. Regional Policy & Coordination of Structural Instruments | | | | |
| 23. Judiciary & Fundamental Rights | | | | |
| 24. Justice, Freedom & Security | | | | |
| 25. Science & Research | | | | |
| 26. Education & Culture | | | | |
| 27. Environment & Climate Change | | | | |
| 28. Consumer & Health Protection | | | | |
| 29. Customs Union | | | | |
| 30. External Relations | | | | |
| 31. Foreign, Security & Defence Policy | | | | |
| 32. Financial Control | | | | |
| 33. Financial & Budgetary Provisions | | | | |
| 34. Institutions | | | | |
| 35. Other Issues | | | | |

November 2026 European Commission Report
| Acquis chapter | Status as of November 2026 | Chapter Status as of November 2026 |
|---|---|---|
| Overview | 4 chapters in early stage, 3 chapters in early stage/with some preparation, 16 chapters with some level of preparation, 2 chapters with some/moderate preparation, 8 chapters with a moderate level of preparation | 33 unopened chapters |
| 1. Free Movement of Goods | Some level of preparation | Chapter unopened |
| 2. Freedom of Movement For Workers | Early stage | Chapter unopened |
| 3. Right of Establishment & Freedom To Provide Services | Moderately prepared | Chapter unopened |
| 4. Free Movement of Capital | Moderately prepared | Chapter unopened |
| 5. Public Procurement | Some level of preparation | Chapter unopened |
| 6. Company Law | Some level of preparation | Chapter unopened |
| 7. Intellectual Property Law | Some level of preparation | Chapter unopened |
| 8. Competition Policy | Early stage / Some | Chapter unopened |
| 9. Financial Services | Some level of preparation | Chapter unopened |
| 10. Information Society & Media | Some level of preparation | Chapter unopened |
| 11. Agriculture & Rural Development | Early stage | Chapter unopened |
| 12. Food Safety, Veterinary & Phytosanitary Policy | Some level of preparation | Chapter unopened |
| 13. Fisheries | Some level of preparation | Chapter unopened |
| 14. Transport Policy | Some level of preparation | Chapter unopened |
| 15. Energy | Some level of preparation | Chapter unopened |
| 16. Taxation | Some / Moderate | Chapter unopened |
| 17. Economic & Monetary Policy | Moderately prepared | Chapter unopened |
| 18. Statistics | Some level of preparation | Chapter unopened |
| 19. Social Policy & Employment | Some level of preparation | Chapter unopened |
| 20. Enterprise & Industrial Policy | Moderately prepared | Chapter unopened |
| 21. Trans-European Networks | Some level of preparation | Chapter unopened |
| 22. Regional Policy & Coordination of Structural Instruments | Early stage / Some | Chapter unopened |
| 23. Judiciary & Fundamental Rights | Early stage / Some | Chapter unopened |
| 24. Justice, Freedom & Security | Some level of preparation | Chapter unopened |
| 25. Science & Research | Moderately prepared | Chapter unopened |
| 26. Education & Culture | Moderately prepared | Chapter unopened |
| 27. Environment & Climate Change | Early stage | Chapter unopened |
| 28. Consumer & Health Protection | Some level of preparation | Chapter unopened |
| 29. Customs Union | Moderately prepared | Chapter unopened |
| 30. External Relations | Moderately prepared | Chapter unopened |
| 31. Foreign, Security & Defence Policy | Some / Moderate | Chapter unopened |
| 32. Financial Control | Some level of preparation | Chapter unopened |
| 33. Financial & Budgetary Provisions | Early stage | Chapter unopened |
| 34. Institutions | Nothing to adopt | Nothing to adopt |
| 35. Other Issues | Nothing to adopt | Nothing to adopt |
Legend: Well advanced Good / Well advanced Good level of preparation Moderate / Good Moderately prepared Some / Moderate Some level of preparation Early stage / Some Early stage

Report history
| Clusters | Acquis Chapter | February 2023 Report | November 2023 Report | October 2024 Report | November 2025 Report | November 2026 Report |
|---|---|---|---|---|---|---|
| 1. Fundamentals | Public administration reform | – | Moderately prepared | Moderately prepared | Some / Moderate | Some / Moderate |
| 1. Fundamentals | 23. Judiciary & Fundamental Rights | Some level of preparation | Some level of preparation | Some level of preparation | Early stage / Some | Early stage / Some |
| 1. Fundamentals | 24. Justice, Freedom & Security | Some level of preparation | Some level of preparation | Some level of preparation | Some level of preparation | Some level of preparation |
| 1. Fundamentals | Economic criteria | – | Moderately prepared | Moderately prepared | Moderately prepared | Moderately prepared |
| 1. Fundamentals | 5. Public Procurement | Some level of preparation | Some level of preparation | Some level of preparation | Some level of preparation | Some level of preparation |
| 1. Fundamentals | 18. Statistics | Some level of preparation | Some level of preparation | Some level of preparation | Some level of preparation | Some level of preparation |
| 1. Fundamentals | 32. Financial Control | Some level of preparation | Some level of preparation | Some level of preparation | Some level of preparation | Some level of preparation |
| 2. Internal Market | 1. Free Movement of Goods | Some level of preparation | Some level of preparation | Some level of preparation | Some level of preparation | Some level of preparation |
| 2. Internal Market | 2. Freedom of Movement For Workers | Early stage | Early stage | Early stage | Early stage | Early stage |
| 2. Internal Market | 3. Right of Establishment & Freedom To Provide Services | Moderately prepared | Moderately prepared | Moderately prepared | Moderately prepared | Moderately prepared |
| 2. Internal Market | 4. Free Movement of Capital | Moderately prepared | Moderately prepared | Moderately prepared | Moderately prepared | Moderately prepared |
| 2. Internal Market | 6. Company Law | Some level of preparation | Some level of preparation | Some level of preparation | Some level of preparation | Some level of preparation |
| 2. Internal Market | 7. Intellectual Property Law | Some level of preparation | Some level of preparation | Some level of preparation | Some level of preparation | Some level of preparation |
| 2. Internal Market | 8. Competition Policy | Early stage | Early stage | Early stage / Some | Early stage / Some | Early stage / Some |
| 2. Internal Market | 9. Financial Services | Some level of preparation | Some level of preparation | Some level of preparation | Some level of preparation | Some level of preparation |
| 2. Internal Market | 28. Consumer & Health Protection | Some level of preparation | Some level of preparation | Some level of preparation | Some level of preparation | Some level of preparation |
| 3. Competitiveness; and inclusive growth | 10. Digital transformation & Media | Some level of preparation | Some level of preparation | Some level of preparation | Some level of preparation | Some level of preparation |
| 3. Competitiveness; and inclusive growth | 16. Taxation | Some level of preparation | Some / Moderate | Some / Moderate | Some / Moderate | Some / Moderate |
| 3. Competitiveness; and inclusive growth | 17. Economic & Monetary Policy | Moderately prepared | Moderately prepared | Moderately prepared | Moderately prepared | Moderately prepared |
| 3. Competitiveness; and inclusive growth | 19. Social Policy & Employment | Some level of preparation | Some level of preparation | Some level of preparation | Some level of preparation | Some level of preparation |
| 3. Competitiveness; and inclusive growth | 20. Enterprise & Industrial Policy | Moderately prepared | Moderately prepared | Moderately prepared | Moderately prepared | Moderately prepared |
| 3. Competitiveness; and inclusive growth | 25. Science & Research | Moderately prepared | Moderately prepared | Moderately prepared | Moderately prepared | Moderately prepared |
| 3. Competitiveness; and inclusive growth | 26. Education & Culture | Moderately prepared | Moderately prepared | Moderately prepared | Moderately prepared | Moderately prepared |
| 3. Competitiveness; and inclusive growth | 29. Customs Union | Moderately prepared | Moderately prepared | Moderately prepared | Moderately prepared | Moderately prepared |
| 4. Green agenda; and sustainable connectivity | 14. Transport | Some level of preparation | Some level of preparation | Some level of preparation | Some level of preparation | Some level of preparation |
| 4. Green agenda; and sustainable connectivity | 15. Energy | Some level of preparation | Some level of preparation | Some level of preparation | Some level of preparation | Some level of preparation |
| 4. Green agenda; and sustainable connectivity | 21. Trans-European Networks | Some level of preparation | Some level of preparation | Some level of preparation | Some level of preparation | Some level of preparation |
| 4. Green agenda; and sustainable connectivity | 27. Environment & Climate Change | Early stage | Early stage | Early stage | Early stage | Early stage |
| 5. Resources, agriculture; and cohesion | 11. Agriculture & Rural Development | Early stage | Early stage | Early stage | Early stage | Early stage |
| 5. Resources, agriculture; and cohesion | 12. Food Safety, Veterinary & Phytosanitary Policy | Some level of preparation | Some level of preparation | Some level of preparation | Some level of preparation | Some level of preparation |
| 5. Resources, agriculture; and cohesion | 13. Fisheries | Some level of preparation | Some level of preparation | Some level of preparation | Some level of preparation | Some level of preparation |
| 5. Resources, agriculture; and cohesion | 22. Regional Policy & Coordination of Structural Instruments | Early stage | Early stage / Some | Early stage / Some | Early stage / Some | Early stage / Some |
| 5. Resources, agriculture; and cohesion | 33. Financial & Budgetary Provisions | Early stage | Early stage | Early stage | Early stage | Early stage |
| 6. External relations | 30. External Relations | Moderately prepared | Moderately prepared | Moderately prepared | Moderately prepared | Moderately prepared |
| 6. External relations | 31. Foreign, Security & Defence Policy | Moderately prepared | Moderately prepared | Moderately prepared | Some / Moderate | Some / Moderate |
| | 34. Institutions | - | - | - | - | - |
| | 35. Other Issues | - | - | - | - | - |
Legend: Well advanced Good / Well advanced Good level of preparation Moderate / Good Moderately prepared Some / Moderate Some level of preparation Early stage / Some Early stage

== Travel ==
Since 28 March 2017, Georgian citizens have been able to travel visa-free to the Schengen area. Starting in 2025, like all nationals from visa-exempt countries, Georgians will also need to comply with the EU's ETIAS system before entering any of the EU/Schengen member countries.

== Impact of joining ==
| Member countries | Population | Area (km^{2}) | GDP (US$) | GDP per capita (US$) | Languages | Scripts |
|---|---|---|---|---|---|---|
| (Georgia (country)) Georgia | 3,688,647 | 69,700 | 30 billion | 8,164 | Georgian | Georgian (Mkhedruli) |
| EU27 | 447,007,596 | 4,233,262 | 17,046 billion | 38,134 | 24 | 3 |
| EU27+1 | 450,731,931 (+0.83%) | 4,302,962 (+1.65%) | 17,076 billion (+0.18%) | 37,885 (−0.65%) | 25 (+1) | 4 (+1) |

== Reactions ==
- Armenia: On 7 February 2024, prime minister of Armenia Nikol Pashinyan congratulated neighboring Georgia for obtaining EU candidate status. During an address to the National Assembly, Pashinyan stated, "Many significant realities have changed in our region, and one of those realities is the fact that Georgia has received the status of a candidate for EU membership, which has an objective impact on our region. It turns out that two of our neighboring countries have the status of a candidate for EU membership, and if before it was possible to say, where is the EU, where is our region, now the EU is actually our region, and we are aware of this fact."

== See also ==
- Georgia-European Union relations
- Georgia–European Union Association Agreement
- Association Trio
- Enlargement of the European Union
- Future enlargement of the European Union
- Accession of Armenia to the European Union
- Accession of Moldova to the European Union
- Accession of Ukraine to the European Union
- Georgia–NATO relations
