= Kobakhidze government =

Kobakhidze government may refer to:

- First Kobakhidze government (February–November 2024)
- Second Kobakhidze government (since November 28, 2024)
