= Acquis communautaire =

EU's accumulated law and legal precedent

The Community acquis or acquis communautaire (/ˈækiː kəˈmjuːnətɛər/; French: [aki kɔmynotɛʁ]), sometimes called the EU acquis, and often shortened to acquis, is the accumulated legislation, legal acts and court decisions that constitute the body of European Union law. The term is French, "acquis" meaning "that which has been acquired or obtained", and “communautaire” meaning "of the community".

== Chapters ==
During the process of the enlargement of the European Union, the acquis was divided into 31 chapters for the purpose of negotiation between the EU and the candidate states for membership for the fifth enlargement (the ten that joined in 2004 plus Romania and Bulgaria which joined in 2007). These chapters were:

1. Free movement of goods
2. Free movement of persons
3. Freedom to provide services
4. Free movement of capital
5. Company law
6. Competition policy
7. Agriculture
8. Fisheries
9. Transport policy
10. Taxation
11. Economic and Monetary Union
12. Statistics
13. Social policy and employment
14. Energy
15. Industrial policy
16. Small and medium-sized enterprises
17. Science and research
18. Education and training
19. Telecommunication and information technologies
20. Culture and audio-visual policy
21. Regional policy and co-ordination of structural instruments
22. Environment
23. Consumers and health protection
24. Cooperation in the field of Justice and Home Affairs
25. Customs union
26. External relations
27. Common Foreign and Security Policy (CFSP)
28. Financial control
29. Financial and budgetary provisions
30. Institutions
31. Others

Beginning with the negotiations with Croatia (which joined in 2013), Iceland and Turkey (which negotiations suspended), the acquis is split up into 35 chapters instead, with the purpose of better balancing the chapters: (dividing the most difficult ones into separate chapters for easier negotiation, uniting some easier chapters, moving some policies between chapters, as well as renaming a few of them in the process)

1. Free movement of goods
2. Freedom of movement for workers
3. Right of establishment and freedom to provide services
4. Free movement of capital
5. Public procurement
6. Company law
7. Intellectual property law
8. Competition policy
9. Financial services
10. Information society and media
11. Agriculture and rural development
12. Food safety, veterinary and phytosanitary policy
13. Fisheries
14. Transport policy
15. Energy
16. Taxation
17. Economic and monetary policy
18. Statistics
19. Social policy and employment (including anti-discrimination and equal opportunities for women and men)
20. Enterprise and industrial policy
21. Trans-European networks
22. Regional policy and co-ordination of structural instruments
23. Judiciary and fundamental rights
24. Justice, freedom and security
25. Science and research
26. Education and culture
27. Environment
28. Consumer and health protection
29. Customs union
30. External relations
31. Foreign, security and defence policy
32. Financial control
33. Financial and budgetary provisions
34. Institutions
35. Other issues

Correspondence between chapters of the 5th and the 6th Enlargement:

5th Enlargement	6th Enlargement
1. Free movement of goods	1. Free movement of goods
1. Free movement of goods	7. Intellectual property law
2. Free movement of persons	2. Freedom of movement for workers
2. Free movement of persons	3. Right of establishment and freedom to provide services
3. Freedom to provide services	3. Right of establishment and freedom to provide services
3. Freedom to provide services	9. Financial services
4. Free movement of capital	4. Free movement of capital
5. Company law	6. Company law
6. Competition policy	8. Competition policy
6. Competition policy	5. Public procurement
7. Agriculture	11. Agriculture and rural development
7. Agriculture	12. Food safety, veterinary and phytosanitary policy
8. Fisheries	13. Fisheries
9. Transport policy	14. Transport policy
9. Transport policy	21. Trans-European networks (one half of it)
10. Taxation	16. Taxation
11. Economic and Monetary Union	17. Economic and monetary policy
12. Statistics	18. Statistics
13. Social policy and employment	19. Social policy and employment; (including anti-discrimination and equal opportunities for women and men)
14. Energy	15. Energy
14. Energy	21. Trans-European networks (one half of it)
15. Industrial policy	20. Enterprise and industrial policy
16. Small and medium-sized enterprises	20. Enterprise and industrial policy
17. Science and research	25. Science and research
18. Education and training	26. Education and culture 10. Information society and media
19. Telecommunication and information technologies	26. Education and culture 10. Information society and media
20. Culture and audio-visual policy	26. Education and culture 10. Information society and media
21. Regional policy and co-ordination of structural instruments	22. Regional policy and co-ordination of structural instruments
22. Environment	27. Environment
23. Consumer and health protection	28. Consumer and health protection
24. Cooperation in the field of Justice and Home Affairs	23. Judiciary and fundamental rights
24. Cooperation in the field of Justice and Home Affairs	24. Justice, freedom and security
25. Customs union	29. Customs union
26. External relations	30. External relations
27. Common Foreign and Security Policy (CFSP)	31. Foreign, security and defence policy
28. Financial control	32. Financial control
29. Financial and budgetary provisions	33. Financial and budgetary provisions
30. Institutions	34. Institutions
31. Others	35. Other issues

Such negotiations usually involved agreeing transitional periods before new member states needed to implement the laws of the European Union fully and before they and their citizens acquired full rights under the acquis.

== Terminology ==
The term acquis is also used to describe laws adopted under the Schengen Agreement, prior to its integration into the European Union legal order by the Treaty of Amsterdam, in which case one speaks of the Schengen acquis. In relation to consumer law and consumer protection, the phrase "consumer acquis" is also used.

It has been used to describe the achievements of the Council of Europe (an international organisation unconnected with the European Union):

The Council of Europe's acquis in standard setting activities in the fields of democracy, the rule of law and fundamental human rights and freedoms should be considered as milestones towards the European political project, and the European Court of Human Rights should be recognised as the pre-eminent judicial pillar of any future architecture.

It has also been applied to the body of "principles, norms and commitments" of the Organization for Security and Co-operation in Europe (OSCE):

Another question under debate has been how the Partners and others could implement the OSCE acquis, in other words its principles, norms, and commitments on a voluntary basis.

The Organisation for Economic Co-operation and Development (OECD) introduced the concept of the OECD Acquis in its "Strategy for enlargement and outreach", May 2004.

== See also ==
- Official Journal of the European Union
- Primacy of European Union law
- Subsidiarity
