= Membership of Kosovo in international organizations =

Since Kosovo's declaration of independence from Serbia (enacted on 17 February 2008), international recognition of Kosovo has been mixed, and the international community continues to be divided on the issue. The Republic of Kosovo is member of some international intergovernmental and international non-governmental organisations.

== Membership in international intergovernmental organizations ==
The Republic of Kosovo, as an independent state, is a member of 10 and an observer of 1 international intergovernmental organization. The Republic of Kosovo has formally applied for membership in 4 more international intergovernmental organizations.

Kosovo, under the designation United Nations Interim Administration Mission in Kosovo (UNMIK), or Kosovo*, is a member of 6 and an observer of 1 international intergovernmental organizations.

Kosovo is a full member of two United Nations specialized agencies, the International Monetary Fund and the World Bank.

Intergovernmental organisations do not themselves diplomatically recognise any state; their member states do so individually. However, depending on the intergovernmental organisation's rules of internal governance and the positions of their member states, they may express positive or negative opinions as to declarations of independence, or choose to offer or withhold membership to a partially recognised state.

International Organisation	Political Entity Represented	Application date	Admission date	Status
During United Nations administration
Southeast European Cooperative Initiative (SECI)	UNMIK			Observer
South East Europe Transport Observatory (SEETO)	Kosovo*		11 June 2004	Member
Energy Community	Kosovo*		1 July 2006	Member
European Common Aviation Area (ECAA)	UNMIK		30 November 2006	Member
Central European Free Trade Agreement (CEFTA)	Kosovo* (UNMIK before 8 October 2024)	6 April 2006	26 July 2007	Member
After the Declaration of Independence
International Monetary Fund (IMF)	Republic of Kosovo	10 July 2008	29 June 2009	Member
World Bank (WB)	Republic of Kosovo	10 July 2008	29 June 2009	Member
Adriatic Charter	Kosovo	29 March 2012	2012	Observer
European Bank for Reconstruction and Development (EBRD)	Republic of Kosovo	2010 or 2009	17 December 2012	Member
Regional Cooperation Council (RCC)	Kosovo*		23 February 2013	Member
Council of Europe Development Bank (CEB)	Republic of Kosovo		14 June 2013	Member
Venice Commission	Republic of Kosovo		13 June 2014	Member
Organisation internationale de la Francophonie (OIF)	Republic of Kosovo		29 November 2014	Observer
South-East European Cooperation Process (SEECP)	Kosovo*		23 May 2015	Member
Parliamentary Assembly of the Council of Europe (PACE)	Kosovo*		28 January 2016	Observer
Egmont Group of Financial Intelligence Units	Republic of Kosovo		1 February 2017	Member
World Customs Organization (WCO)	Republic of Kosovo		3 March 2017	Member
Permanent Court of Arbitration (PCA)	Republic of Kosovo	6 November 2015	5 January 2016	Member
European Qualifications Framework Advisory Group (EQF)	Republic of Kosovo		18 December 2015	Member
International Federation of Arts Councils and Culture Agencies (IFACCA)	Republic of Kosovo		21 February 2017	Member
Bureau of International Expositions (BIE)	Republic of Kosovo		18 March 2017	Member
Assemblée parlementaire de la francophonie (APF)	Republic of Kosovo		9 July 2018	Observer
Organisation internationale de la Francophonie (OIF)	Republic of Kosovo	9 October 2018	11 October 2018	Associate
European Political Community (EPC)	Kosovo*		6 October 2022	Member
International Commission on Missing Persons	Republic of Kosovo		19 July 2023	Member
NATO Parliamentary Assembly	Kosovo		24 March 2024	Associate
European Coalition Against Drugs	Kosovo*		2 October 2025	Member
Board of Peace	Republic of Kosovo		22 January 2026	Member

=== Ongoing applications ===
Kosovo has been a member of the Council of Europe's Venice Commission since 2014. The Assembly of Kosovo was invited to take part in the work of the Parliamentary Assembly of the Council of Europe and its committees as an observer in 2016. In February 2017, Kosovo's President, Hashim Thaçi, said that Kosovo will apply for membership in the Council of Europe. Kosovo formally applied for membership of the Council of Europe in May 2022. On 24 April 2023, Kosovo's application was approved by more than the 2/3 threshold of member states required in the Committee of Ministers and was referred to the Parliamentary Assembly for its consideration. Kosovo's application was approved by the Committee on Political Affairs and Democracy on 27 March 2024. On 16 April 2024, the Parliamentary Assembly voted in favour of Kosovo's membership, with 131 votes in favour, 29 against and 11 abstentions.

Kosovo formally applied for European Union candidate status on 15 December 2022.

International Organisation	Political Entity Represented	Application date
Council of Bureaux (CoBx)	Republic of Kosovo	2011
NATO Partnership for Peace (PfP)	Republic of Kosovo	July 2012
International Criminal Police Organization (INTERPOL)	Republic of Kosovo	April 2015
Council of Europe (CoE)	Kosovo	12 May 2022
European Union (EU)	Republic of Kosovo	15 December 2022

== Membership in international non-governmental organisations ==
International organisation	Position	Admission date	Status
International Road and Transport Union (IRU)	Kosovo's road transport association become member of IRU on 29 July 2008. Kosovo officially became the 181st member of the IRU in May 2009.	29 July 2008	Member
International Bar Association (IBA)	Kosovo officially became a member of the IBA on 28 May 2009.	28 May 2009	Member
International Amateur Radio Union (IARU)	Kosovo Amateur Radio Association (Shoqata e Radio Amatoreve te Kosovës; SHRAK) was proposed for IARU membership in 2014. SHRAK joined to the IARU on 11 December 2015.	11 December 2015	Member
European Federation of Journalists (EFJ)	Association of Journalists of Kosovo officially became a member of the EFJ on 1 January 2016.	1 January 2016	Member
International Consumer Protection and Enforcement Network (ICPEN)	Kosovo officially became a member of the ICPEN in April 2016.	April 2016	Member
Association of Central and Eastern European Election Officials (ACEEEO)	On 23 September 2016, the Central Election Commission of the Republic of Kosovo became member of ACEEEO.	23 September 2016	Member
European Federation of Psychiatric Trainees (EFPT)	Kosovo Psychiatrists Association is a full member of EFPT as of January 18, 2017.	18 January 2017	Member
World Economic Forum (WEF)	Kosovo participates in the World Economic Forum under its own name and flag.		Member
Munich Security Conference	Kosovo's delegates are listed as representing the Republic of Kosovo.		Participant
Euro Geo Surveys	The Geological Survey of Kosovo is a full member of Euro Geo Surveys (EGS) and Kosovo is represented as a country on EGS' European Geological Data Infrastructure (EGDI) maps.		Member

== International conventions, treaties, and agreements ==
Conventions, Treaties and Agreements	Note	Signed
Stabilisation and Association Process (SAA)	SAA negotiations start on 28 October 2013. Kosovo's SAA was the first signed after the entry into force of the Lisbon treaty, which conferred a legal personality to the EU. As a result, unlike previous SAAs Kosovo's is exclusively between it and the EU and Euratom, and the member states are not parties independently. SAA entry into force on 1 April 2016.	Yes
Apostille Convention	On 8 November 2016, the Republic of Kosovo has received a formal confirmation on the acceptance of deposition of acts o admission to the Convention Abolishing the Requirement of Legislation for Foreign Public Documents, or known also as Apostille Convention. In accordance with Article 12 of it, Apostille Convention, it is expected to enter into force on 14 June 2016.	Yes

International treaty or convention	Political Entity Represented	Signature	Ratification
Free Trade Agreement with Albania	UNMIK	7 July 2003	1 October 2003
Free Trade Agreement with North Macedonia	UNMIK		2 February 2006
Free Trade Agreement with Croatia	UNMIK	28 September 2006	1 November 2006
Free Trade Agreement with Bosnia and Herzegovina	UNMIK	19 October 2006	1 December 2006
EU Pan-EURO-MED RoO convention	Kosovo under UNSCR 1244		
Free Trade Agreement with Turkey	Kosovo	27 September 2013	1 September 2019
Stabilisation and Association Agreement (SAA) with the EU	Kosovo	22 October 2015	1 April 2016
UK/Kosovo: Partnership, Trade and Cooperation Agreement	Kosovo	20 December 2019	
EU Schengen Area non-visa agreement	Kosovo	26 April 2023	1 January 2024
13 agreements and declarations with Albania	Kosovo	6 July 2023	
Free trade agreement with the European Free Trade Association	Kosovo	22 January 2025	1 October 2026

== Future membership applications ==
In 2012, according to the Mena Report Kosovo has applied to become a member of the Organisation of Islamic Cooperation (OIC), but the government of Kosovo neither confirm nor deny this news. Ekmeleddin İhsanoğlu, Secretary-General of the OIC invited Kosovo to become a full member of the OIC shortly after their independence.

In 2013, Enver Hoxhaj, Kosovo's Minister of Foreign Affairs, has stated that the country is considering making applications for membership in three United Nations specialized agencies in the first half of 2013, and that an application for membership of the Council of Europe in 2014 is being prepared. In 2014, Kosovo's Deputy Prime and Minister of Foreign Affairs, Hashim Thaçi, reiterated the state's desire to join in December 2014. Kosovo's Foreign Minister Hoxhaj has said that Kosovo's goal was to be a full UN member state by 2020 and NATO member state by 2022.

In 2015, Kosovo's Ministry of Trade and Industry is also preparing a membership application for the World Trade Organization. Joining NATO's Partnership for Peace is a priority of the government.

In 2016, Albanian Minister of Foreign Affairs, Ditmir Bushati, said that Kosovo will be member of the Organization for Security and Co-operation in Europe (OSCE).

== Unsuccessful application ==
International organisation	Note	Application date
United Nations Educational, Scientific and Cultural Organization (UNESCO)	In July 2015, Kosovo applied for membership in UNESCO. UNESCO Executive Board members have voted in favor of the Albanian initiative to recommend Kosovo to be allowed to join UNESCO, 27 members voted in favor, 14 voted against, and 14 abstained. On 9 November 2015, UNESCO General Assembly voted on Kosovo's application. 142 members voted on the proposal: 92 in favor, 50 against, while 29 abstained. Kosovo's bid required 95 votes (2/3 of votes) in favor to be successful.	July 2015

== See also ==
- Foreign relations of Kosovo
- International recognition of Kosovo
- Membership of Kosovo in international sports federations
- Kosovo precedent
