= Regional organisations by country =

This table lists the regional organisations each country is a member of.

== Table ==
M	Member	O	Observer

Country	ACD	SCO	BRICS	APEC	Commonwealth	RCEP	SAARC	SAPCZ	OSCE	African Union	OAS	NATO	Council of Europe	IATRA	CELAC	ASEAN	ALADI	EEA	EU	NAFTA	EEC	Arab League	OPEC	BSEC	CBSS	CIS	Mercosur	ACS	Pacific Alliance	CSTO	EAEU	SEECP	BIC	Visegrád Group	GUAM	SICA	UNASUR	PIF	Benelux	Nordic Council	CEFTA	CARICOM	EFTA	OECS
Afghanistan	M						M														M																							
Albania									M			M	M											M								M									M			
Algeria										M												M	M																					
Andorra									M				M																															
Angola								M		M																																		
Antigua and Barbuda					M						M				M													M														M		M
Argentina								M			M			M	M		M										M																	
Armenia									M				M											M		M				M	M													
Australia				M	M	M																																M						
Austria									M				M					M	M																									
Azerbaijan									M				M								M			M		M									M									
Bahamas					M						M			M	M													M														M		
Bahrain	M																					M																						
Bangladesh	M				M		M																																					
Barbados					M						M				M													M														M		
Belarus		M							M																	M				M	M													
Belgium									M			M	M					M	M																				M					
Belize					M						M				M													M								M						M		
Benin								M		M																																		
Bhutan	M						M																																					
Bolivia											M				M		M										M										M							
Bosnia and Herzegovina													M																			M									M			
Botswana					M					M																																		
Brazil			M					M			M			M	M		M										M																	
Brunei	M			M	M	M										M																												
Bulgaria									M			M	M					M	M					M								M												
Burkina Faso										M																																		
Burundi										M																																		
Cambodia	M					M										M																												
Cameroon					M			M		M																																		
Canada				M	M				M		M	M								M																								
Cape Verde								M		M																																		
Chad										M																																		
Chile				M							M			M	M		M												M															
China	M	M	M	M		M																																						
Colombia											M			M	M		M											M	M															
Comoros										M												M																						
Congo								M		M													M																					
Costa Rica											M			M	M													M								M								
Croatia									M			M	M					M	M													M												
Cuba											M				M		M											M																
Cyprus					M				M				M					M	M																									
Czech Republic									M			M	M					M	M															M										
Denmark									M			M	M					M	M						M															M				
Djibouti										M												M																						
Dominica					M						M			M	M													M														M		M
Dominican Republic											M			M	M													M								M								
DR Congo								M		M																																		
East Timor																M																												
Ecuador											M				M		M																											
Egypt			M							M												M																						
El Salvador											M				M													M								M								
Equatorial Guinea										M													M																					
Eritrea										M																																		
Estonia									M			M	M					M	M						M																			
Eswatini										M																																		
Ethiopia			M							M																																		
Fiji					M																																	M						
Finland									M			M	M					M	M						M															M				
France									M			M	M					M	M																									
Gabon					M			M		M													M																					
Gambia								M		M																																		
Georgia									M				M											M											M									
Germany									M			M	M					M	M						M																			
Ghana					M			M		M																																		
Greece									M			M	M					M	M					M								M												
Grenada					M						M				M													M														M		M
Guatemala											M			M	M													M								M								
Guinea								M		M																																		
Guinea-Bissau								M		M																																		
Guyana					M						M				M													M									M					M		
Haiti											M			M	M													M														M		
Honduras											M			M	M													M								M								
Hungary									M			M	M					M	M															M										
Iceland									M			M	M					M							M															M			M	
India	M	M	M		M		M																																					
Indonesia	M		M	M		M										M																												
Iran	M	M	M																		M		M																					
Iraq																						M	M																					
Ireland									M				M					M	M														M											
Israel																																												
Italy									M			M	M					M	M																									
Ivory Coast								M																																				
Jamaica					M						M				M													M														M		
Japan	M			M		M																																						
Jordan																						M																						
Kazakhstan	M	M							M												M					M				M	M													
Kenya					M					M																																		
Kiribati					M																																	M						
Kuwait	M																					M	M																					
Kyrgyzstan	M	M							M												M					M				M	M													
Laos	M					M										M																												
Latvia									M			M	M					M	M						M																			
Lebanon																						M																						
Lesotho					M					M																																		
Liberia								M		M																																		
Libya										M												M	M																					
Liechtenstein									M				M					M																									M	
Lithuania									M			M	M					M	M						M																			
Luxembourg									M			M	M					M	M																				M					
Madagascar										M																																		
Malawi					M					M																																		
Malaysia	M			M	M	M										M																												
Maldives					M		M																																					
Mali										M																																		
Malta					M				M				M					M	M																									
Marshall Islands																																						M						
Mauritania										M												M																						
Mauritius					M					M																																		
Mexico				M							M				M		M			M								M	M								O							
Micronesia																																						M						
Moldova									M				M											M		M						M			M						M			
Monaco									M				M																															
Mongolia	M								M																																			
Montenegro									M			M	M																			M									M			
Morocco										M												M																						
Mozambique					M					M																																		
Myanmar	M					M										M																												
Namibia					M			M		M																																		
Nauru					M																																	M						
Nepal	M						M																																					
Netherlands									M			M	M					M	M																				M					
New Caledonia																																												
New Zealand				M	M	M																																M						
Nicaragua															M													M								M								
Niger					M			M		M																																		
Nigeria					M			M		M													M																					
North Korea																																												
North Macedonia									M			M	M																			M												
Norway									M			M	M					M							M															M			M	
Oman	M																					M																						
Pakistan	M	M			M		M														M																							
Palau																																						M						
Palestine																						M																						
Panama											M			M	M		M											M								M	O							
Papua New Guinea				M	M																																	M						
Paraguay											M			M	M		M										M																	
Peru				M							M			M	M		M												M															
Philippines	M			M		M										M																												
Poland									M			M	M					M	M						M									M										
Portugal									M			M	M					M	M																									
Qatar	M																					M																						
Romania									M			M	M					M	M					M								M												
Russia	M	M	M	M										M										M		M				M	M													
Rwanda					M					M																																		
Saint Kitts and Nevis					M						M				M													M														M		M
Saint Lucia					M						M				M													M														M		
Saint Vincent and the Grenadines					M						M				M													M														M		M
San Marino									M				M																															
São Tomé and Príncipe								M		M																																		
Saudi Arabia	M																					M	M																					
Senegal								M		M																																		
Serbia									M				M											M								M									M			
Seychelles					M					M																																		
Sierra Leone					M			M																																				
Singapore	M			M	M	M										M																												
Slovakia									M			M	M					M	M															M										
Slovenia									M			M	M					M	M													M												
Solomon Islands					M																																	M						
Somalia										M												M																						
South Africa			M		M			M		M																																		
South Korea	M			M		M																																						
South Sudan										M																																		
Spain									M			M	M					M	M																									
Sri Lanka					M		M																																					
Sudan										M												M																						
Suriname											M				M													M									M					M		
Sweden									M			M	M					M	M						M															M				
Switzerland									M				M					M																									M	
Syria																						M																						
Taiwan				M																																								
Tajikistan	M	M							M												M					M				M														
Tanzania					M					M																																		
Thailand	M			M		M										M																												
Togo					M			M		M																																		
Tonga					M																																	M						
Trinidad and Tobago					M						M			M	M													M														M		
Tunisia										M												M																						
Turkey	M								M			M	M								M			M								M												
Turkmenistan									M												M																							
Tuvalu					M																																	M						
Uganda					M					M																																		
Ukraine									M				M											M											M									
United Arab Emirates	M		M																			M	M																					
United Kingdom					M				M			M	M																				M											
United States				M							M	M								M																								
Uruguay								M			M				M		M										M										M							
Uzbekistan	M	M							M												M					M																		
Vanuatu					M																																	M						
Vatican City									M																																			
Venezuela											M			M	M		M						M					M									M							
Vietnam	M			M		M										M																												
Yemen																						M																						
Zambia					M					M																																		
Zimbabwe										M																																		

== List ==
Country	Regional organisations
Afghanistan	ACD, SAARC, ECO
Albania	OSCE, NATO, Council of Europe, BSEC, SEECP, CEFTA
Algeria	African Union, Arab League, OPEC
Andorra	OSCE, Council of Europe
Angola	SAPCZ, African Union
Antigua and Barbuda	Commonwealth, OAS, CELAC, ACS, CARICOM, OECS
Argentina	SAPCZ, OAS, IATRA, CELAC, ALADI, Mercosur
Armenia	OSCE, Council of Europe, BSEC, CIS, CSTO, EAEU
Australia	APEC, Commonwealth, RCEP, PIF
Austria	OSCE, Council of Europe, EEA, EU
Azerbaijan	OSCE, Council of Europe, ECO, BSEC, CIS, GUAM
Bahamas	Commonwealth, OAS, IATRA, CELAC, ACS, CARICOM
Bahrain	ACD, Arab League
Bangladesh	ACD, Commonwealth, SAARC
Barbados	Commonwealth, OAS, CELAC, ACS, CARICOM
Belarus	OSCE, CIS, CSTO, EAEU, SCO
Belgium	OSCE, NATO, Council of Europe, EEA, EU, Benelux
Belize	Commonwealth, OAS, CELAC, ACS, SICA, CARICOM
Benin	SAPCZ, African Union
Bhutan	ACD, SAARC
Bolivia	OAS, CELAC, ALADI, Mercosur, UNASUR
Bosnia and Herzegovina	Council of Europe, SEECP, CEFTA
Botswana	Commonwealth, African Union
Brazil	BRICS, SAPCZ, OAS, IATRA, CELAC, ALADI, Mercosur
Brunei	ACD, APEC, Commonwealth, RCEP, ASEAN
Bulgaria	OSCE, NATO, Council of Europe, EEA, EU, BSEC, SEECP
Burkina Faso	African Union
Burundi	African Union
Cambodia	ACD, RCEP, ASEAN
Cameroon	Commonwealth, SAPCZ, African Union
Canada	APEC, Commonwealth, OSCE, OAS, NATO, NAFTA
Cape Verde	SAPCZ, African Union
Central African Republic	
Chad	African Union
Chile	APEC, OAS, IATRA, CELAC, ALADI, Pacific Alliance
China	ACD, SCO, BRICS, APEC, RCEP
Colombia	OAS, IATRA, CELAC, ALADI, ACS, Pacific Alliance
Comoros	African Union, Arab League
Congo	SAPCZ, African Union, OPEC
Costa Rica	OAS, IATRA, CELAC, ACS, SICA
Croatia	OSCE, NATO, Council of Europe, EEA, EU, SEECP
Cuba	OAS, CELAC, ALADI, ACS
Cyprus	Commonwealth, OSCE, Council of Europe, EEA, EU
Czech Republic	OSCE, NATO, Council of Europe, EEA, EU, Visegrád Group
Denmark	OSCE, NATO, Council of Europe, EEA, EU, CBSS, Nordic Council
Djibouti	African Union, Arab League
Dominica	Commonwealth, OAS, IATRA, CELAC, ACS, CARICOM, OECS
Dominican Republic	OAS, IATRA, CELAC, ACS, SICA
DR Congo	SAPCZ, African Union
East Timor	ASEAN
Ecuador	OAS, CELAC, ALADI
Egypt	BRICS, African Union, Arab League
El Salvador	OAS, CELAC, ACS, SICA
Equatorial Guinea	African Union, OPEC
Eritrea	African Union
Estonia	OSCE, NATO, Council of Europe, EEA, EU, CBSS
Eswatini	African Union
Ethiopia	BRICS, African Union
Fiji	Commonwealth, PIF
Finland	OSCE, NATO, Council of Europe, EEA, EU, CBSS, Nordic Council
France	OSCE, NATO, Council of Europe, EEA, EU
Gabon	Commonwealth, SAPCZ, African Union, OPEC
Gambia	SAPCZ, African Union
Georgia	OSCE, Council of Europe, BSEC, GUAM
Germany	OSCE, NATO, Council of Europe, EEA, EU, CBSS
Ghana	Commonwealth, SAPCZ, African Union
Greece	OSCE, NATO, Council of Europe, EEA, EU, BSEC, SEECP
Grenada	Commonwealth, OAS, CELAC, ACS, CARICOM, OECS
Guatemala	OAS, IATRA, CELAC, ACS, SICA
Guinea	APEC, SAPCZ, African Union
Guinea-Bissau	SAPCZ, African Union
Guyana	Commonwealth, OAS, CELAC, ACS, UNASUR, CARICOM
Haiti	OAS, IATRA, CELAC, ACS, CARICOM
Honduras	OAS, IATRA, CELAC, ACS, SICA
Hungary	OSCE, NATO, Council of Europe, EEA, EU, Visegrád Group
Iceland	OSCE, NATO, Council of Europe, EEA, CBSS, Nordic Council, EFTA
India	ACD, SCO, BRICS, Commonwealth, SAARC
Indonesia	ACD, BRICS, APEC, RCEP, ASEAN
Iran	SCO, BRICS, ACD, ECO, OPEC
Iraq	Arab League, OPEC
Ireland	OSCE, Council of Europe, EEA, EU, BIC
Israel	
Italy	OSCE, NATO, Council of Europe, EEA, EU
Ivory Coast	SAPCZ
Jamaica	Commonwealth, OAS, CELAC, ACS, CARICOM
Japan	ACD, APEC, RCEP
Jordan	Arab League
Kazakhstan	ACD, SCO, OSCE, ECO, CIS, CSTO, EAEU
Kenya	Commonwealth, African Union
Kiribati	Commonwealth, PIF
Kuwait	ACD, Arab League, OPEC
Kyrgyzstan	ACD, SCO, OSCE, ECO, CIS, CSTO, EAEU
Laos	ACD, RCEP, ASEAN
Latvia	OSCE, NATO, Council of Europe, EEA, EU, CBSS
Lebanon	Arab League
Lesotho	Commonwealth, African Union
Liberia	SAPCZ, African Union
Libya	African Union, Arab League, OPEC
Liechtenstein	OSCE, Council of Europe, EEA, EFTA
Lithuania	OSCE, NATO, Council of Europe, EEA, EU, CBSS
Luxembourg	OSCE, NATO, Council of Europe, EEA, EU, Benelux
Madagascar	African Union
Malawi	Commonwealth, African Union
Malaysia	ACD, APEC, Commonwealth, RCEP, ASEAN
Maldives	Commonwealth, SAARC
Mali	African Union
Malta	Commonwealth, OSCE, Council of Europe, EEA, EU
Marshall Islands	Pacific Islands Forum
Mauritania	African Union, Arab League
Mauritius	Commonwealth, African Union
Mexico	APEC, OAS, CELAC, ALADI, NAFTA, ACS, Pacific Alliance
Micronesia	Pacific Islands Forum
Moldova	OSCE, Council of Europe, BSEC, CIS, SEECP, GUAM, CEFTA
Monaco	OSCE, Council of Europe
Mongolia	ACD, OSCE
Montenegro	OSCE, NATO, Council of Europe, SEECP, CEFTA
Morocco	African Union, Arab League
Mozambique	Commonwealth, African Union
Myanmar	ACD, RCEP, ASEAN
Namibia	Commonwealth, SAPCZ, African Union
Nauru	Commonwealth, PIF
Nepal	ACD, SAARC
Netherlands	OSCE, NATO, Council of Europe, EEA, EU, Benelux
New Zealand	APEC, Commonwealth, RCEP, PIF
Nicaragua	CELAC, ACS, SICA
Niger	Commonwealth, SAPCZ, African Union
Nigeria	Commonwealth, SAPCZ, African Union, OPEC
North Korea	
North Macedonia	OSCE, NATO, Council of Europe, SEECP
Norway	OSCE, NATO, Council of Europe, EEA, CBSS, Nordic Council, EFTA
Oman	ACD, Arab League
Pakistan	ACD, SCO, Commonwealth, SAARC, ECO
Palau	Pacific Islands Forum
Palestine	Arab League
Panama	OAS, IATRA, CELAC, ALADI, ACS, SICA
Papua New Guinea	APEC, Commonwealth, PIF
Paraguay	OAS, IATRA, CELAC, ALADI, Mercosur
Peru	APEC, OAS, IATRA, CELAC, ALADI, Pacific Alliance
Philippines	ACD, APEC, RCEP, ASEAN
Poland	OSCE, NATO, Council of Europe, EEA, EU, CBSS, Visegrád Group
Portugal	OSCE, NATO, Council of Europe, EEA, EU
Qatar	ACD, Arab League
Romania	OSCE, NATO, Council of Europe, EEA, EU, BSEC, SEECP
Russia	ACD, SCO, BRICS, APEC, OSCE, BSEC, CIS, CSTO, EAEU
Rwanda	Commonwealth, African Union
Saint Kitts and Nevis	Commonwealth, OAS, CELAC, ACS, CARICOM, OECS
Saint Lucia	Commonwealth, OAS, CELAC, ACS, CARICOM
Saint Vincent and the Grenadines	Commonwealth, OAS, CELAC, ACS, CARICOM, OECS
San Marino	OSCE, Council of Europe
São Tomé and Príncipe	SAPCZ, African Union
Saudi Arabia	ACD, Arab League, OPEC
Senegal	SAPCZ, African Union
Serbia	OSCE, Council of Europe, BSEC, SEECP, CEFTA
Seychelles	Commonwealth, African Union
Sierra Leone	Commonwealth, SAPCZ
Singapore	ACD, APEC, Commonwealth, RCEP, ASEAN
Slovakia	OSCE, NATO, Council of Europe, EEA, EU, Visegrád Group
Slovenia	OSCE, NATO, Council of Europe, EEA, EU, SEECP
Solomon Islands	Commonwealth, PIF
Somalia	African Union, Arab League
South Africa	BRICS, Commonwealth, SAPCZ, African Union
South Korea	ACD, APEC, RCEP
South Sudan	African Union
Spain	OSCE, NATO, Council of Europe, EEA, EU
Sri Lanka	Commonwealth, SAARC
Sudan	African Union, Arab League
Suriname	OAS, CELAC, ACS, UNASUR, CARICOM
Sweden	OSCE, NATO, Council of Europe, EEA, EU, CBSS, Nordic Council
Switzerland	OSCE, Council of Europe, EEA, EFTA
Syria	Arab League
Taiwan	APEC
Tajikistan	ACD, SCO, OSCE, ECO, CIS, CSTO
Tanzania	Commonwealth, African Union
Thailand	ACD, APEC, RCEP, ASEAN
Togo	Commonwealth, SAPCZ, African Union
Tonga	Commonwealth, PIF
Trinidad and Tobago	Commonwealth, OAS, IATRA, CELAC, ACS, CARICOM
Tunisia	African Union, Arab League
Turkey	ACD, OSCE, NATO, Council of Europe, ECO, BSEC, SEECP
Turkmenistan	OSCE, ECO
Tuvalu	Commonwealth, PIF
Uganda	Commonwealth, African Union
Ukraine	OSCE, Council of Europe, BSEC, GUAM
United Arab Emirates	BRICS, ACD, Arab League, OPEC
United Kingdom	Commonwealth, OSCE, NATO, Council of Europe, BIC
United States	APEC, OAS, NATO, NAFTA
Uruguay	SAPCZ, OAS, CELAC, ALADI, Mercosur, UNASUR
Uzbekistan	ACD, SCO, OSCE, ECO, CIS
Vanuatu	Commonwealth, PIF
Vatican City	OSCE
Venezuela	OAS, IATRA, CELAC, ALADI, OPEC, ACS, UNASUR
Vietnam	ACD, APEC, RCEP, ASEAN
Yemen	Arab League
Zambia	Commonwealth, African Union
Zimbabwe	African Union
