= Goran Svilanović =

Serbian politician and diplomat

Goran Svilanović Горан Свилановић
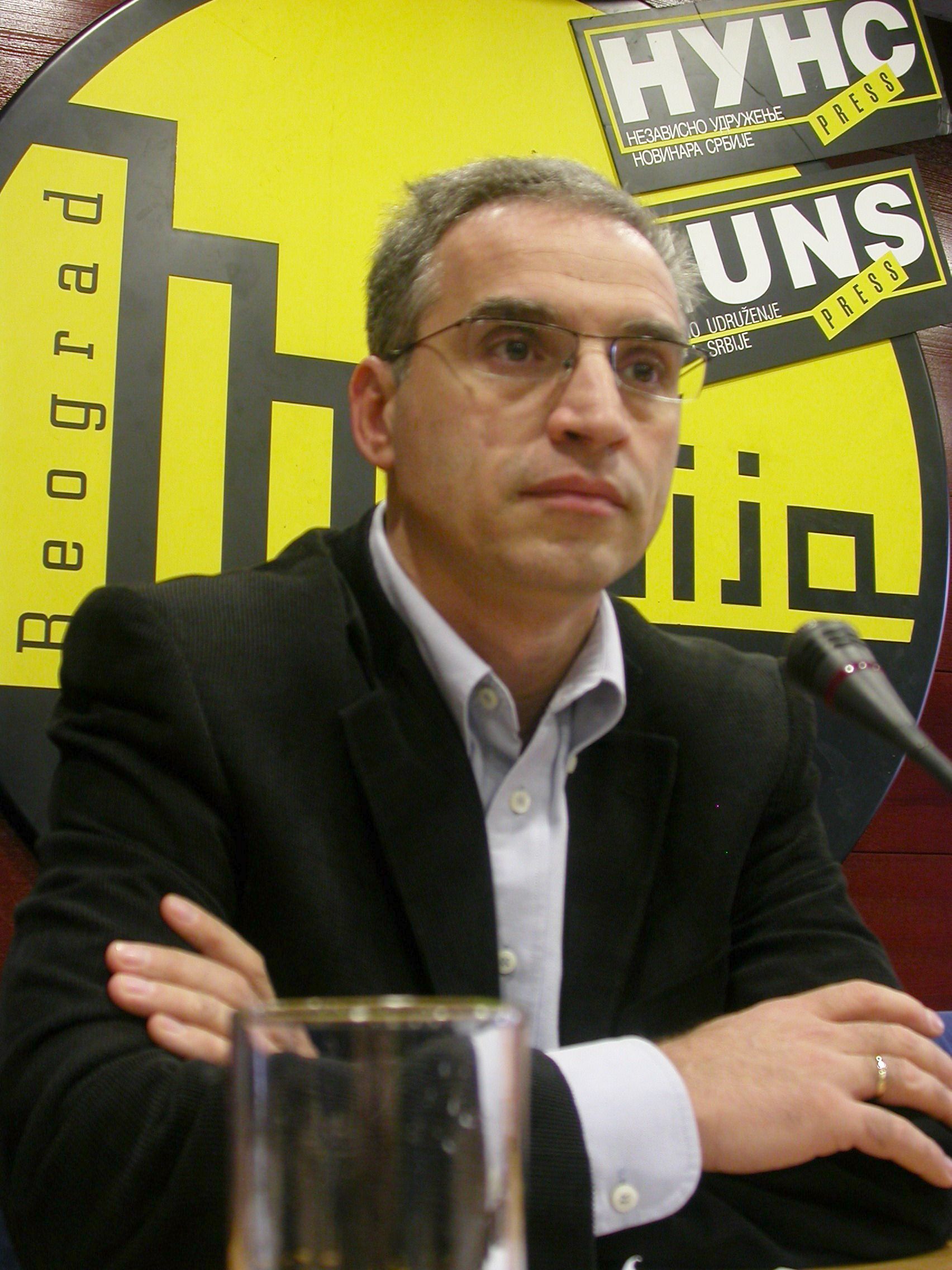
- Svilanović in 2007

Secretary General of the Regional Cooperation Council
- In office 1 January 2013 – 31 December 2018
- Preceded by: Hidajet Biščević
- Succeeded by: Majlinda Bregu

Minister of Foreign Affairs of Yugoslavia/Serbia and Montenegro
- In office 4 November 2000 – 16 April 2004
- Preceded by: Živadin Jovanović
- Succeeded by: Vuk Drašković

Personal details
- Born: 22 October 1963 (age 63) Gnjilane, SR Serbia, SFR Yugoslavia (now Gnjilan, Kosovo)
- Education: University of Belgrade

Goran Svilanović (Serbian Cyrillic: Горан Свилановић; born 22 October 1963) is a Serbian politician and diplomat.

== Career ==
Svilanović has been active in politics since 1993. He became president of the Civic Alliance of Serbia (Građanski Savez Srbije) in 1999 and held this position until 2004, when he resigned. From 2000 to 2004, he was Minister of Foreign Affairs of the Federal Republic of Yugoslavia, which was renamed Serbia and Montenegro in 2003. After years of negotiations, disagreements and delays he signed the Agreement on Succession Issues of the Former Socialist Federal Republic of Yugoslavia on behalf of Federal Republic of Yugoslavia. He served from November 2004 until the end of 2007 as the chairman of Working Table I (democratization and human rights) of the Stability Pact for South Eastern Europe. He was also a member of the Senior Review Group of the Stability Pact, which proposed the transformation of the Stability Pact into the Regional Co-operation Council. He served as coordinator of the OSCE Economic and Environmental Activities (2008–2012).

Since 2008, Svilanović has been assistant professor of law at Union University in Belgrade. He has also been engaged and worked with a number of organizations and committees, such as the Centre for Antiwar Action (1995–1999), the International Commission on the Balkans (2004–2006) and the Belgrade Centre for Human Rights (2007–2008). He is a Senior Network Member at the European Leadership Network (ELN).

He was the Secretary General of the Regional Cooperation Council (RCC), from 1 January 2013 until 31 December 2018, following the appointment by the South-East European Cooperation Process (SEECP) Foreign Ministers in Belgrade, Serbia on 14 June 2012.

Currently he is serving as the advisor of the cabinet of Zdravko Krivokapić for economic reforms and European integration.

== Education ==
Svilanović holds a PhD from the Union University in Belgrade, Masters and undergraduate law degrees from the University of Belgrade Faculty of Law. He has also studied at the Institute for Human Rights in Strasbourg, France, the University of Saarland, Germany, and the European University Center for Peace Studies in Staadtschlaining, Austria.

== Personal life ==
The Svilanović family moved from Gnjilane to Belgrade when Goran was seven. His father Tihomir held a doctoral degree in agricultural science and his mother Stavrula was an accountant. Svilanović is married and has two children. He speaks Serbian and English.

Party political offices
Preceded by Vesna Pešić	President of the Civic Alliance of Serbia; 1999–2004	Succeeded by Nataša Mićić
