= Central European Initiative =

European forum of regional cooperation

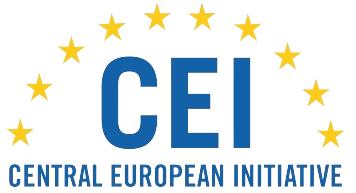
- Logo

- Member states Suspended member states
- Headquarters: Trieste, Italy
- Type: Intergovernmental organization
- Membership: 17 member states: Albania; Hungary; Romania; Belarus (suspended); Italy; Serbia; Bosnia and Herzegovina; Moldova; Slovakia; Bulgaria; Montenegro; Slovenia; Croatia; North Macedonia; Ukraine; Czech Republic; Poland

Leaders
  - Secretary general: Franco Dal Mas

Establishment
  - Founded: 1989
- Website http://www.cei.int/

The Central European Initiative (CEI) is a forum of regional cooperation in Central and Eastern Europe, counting 17 member states. It was formed in Budapest in 1989. The body was developed on the basis of earlier experiences with The Alps-Adriatic Working Group. The CEI headquarters have been in Trieste, Italy, since 1996.

== History ==
The Central European Initiative or CEI, is the largest and oldest forum of regional cooperation in Central, Eastern and South Eastern Europe. It now counts 17 member states, based on region and democratic values: Albania, Belarus, Bosnia and Herzegovina, Bulgaria, Croatia, the Czech Republic, Hungary, Italy, Moldova, Montenegro, North Macedonia, Poland, Romania, Serbia, Slovakia, Slovenia and Ukraine. The origin of the Central European Initiative lies in the creation of what was then known as the Quadragonale in Budapest on 11 November 1989 whose founding members were Italy, Austria, Hungary and the Socialist Federal Republic of Yugoslavia (SFRY). The conjunction with the fall of the Berlin Wall was a coincidence, yet the CEI has been involved in democratizing Eastern European countries after the Soviet Bloc dissolved.

The Initiative aimed at overcoming the division in blocks by re-establishing cooperation links, among countries of different political orientations and economic structures. This was largely headed by Italy, who at the time, wanted greater involvement in supporting Eastern European countries in order to rival a newly reunited Germany.

At the first Summit in Venice in 1990, Czechoslovakia was admitted and the Initiative was renamed Pentagonale. In 1991, with the admission of Poland it became the Hexagonale.

The organization was renamed Central European Initiative (CEI) from the Hexagonale in 1992, and has held the name since. On the same occasion, Macedonia, Bosnia and Herzegovina, Croatia and Slovenia were admitted as member states. That year, Yugoslavia's recognition ceased, due to a violent break ups of the nation and the recognition of Croatia and Slovenia as independent nations. The Czech Republic and Slovakia were admitted to the CEI in 1993 following the dissolution of Czechoslovakia. In 1996, Albania, Belarus, Bulgaria, Moldova, Romania and Ukraine joined the CEI as full-fledged members.

In recent years the CEI has focused on expanding healthcare access within its 17 member states. It has partnered with the World Health Organization (WHO) to focus on preventing unwanted consequences from the pandemic and the sharing of health information. They have met regularly since this partnership was founded in June 2022, with the most recent meeting happening November 2024. In the latest meeting, the organizations focused on health in the Western Balkans, implementing focus on integration following the EU model.

== Structures ==
The structure of the CEI is unique, with changing staff, headquarters or budget. It operates through regular forums, usually held in November that invite senior officials and politicians. There are 5 regular meetings,

- Heads of State/Government Meeting (annually, in the autumn);
- Parliamentary Dimension (the CEI Parliamentary Committee which meets in the spring and the CEI Parliamentary Conference which meets in the autumn);
- Foreign Ministers Meeting (annually, in the spring, but Foreign Ministers also attend and take part in the Heads of Government meeting);
- Special Meetings of Sectoral Ministers;
- Meetings of the Committee of National Coordinators (monthly)

One member state of the CEI takes on the role of the presidency each year, leading forums and meetings. In 1995, the Heads of Government meeting adopted an official documentation of the rules, guidelines and definition of the CEI. "forum for cooperation in the region' which 'does not replace other, bilateral and multilateral channels of cooperation, neither affects the commitments of the Member States resulting of their respective international agreements". It has a "bottom-up" approach to promote regional cooperation and growth, particularly in newly democratic states.

The CEI has a three-pillar system: It cooperates in a governmental dimension, a parliamentary dimension and a business dimension.

It promotes connectivity and diversity through 6 main areas: Good governance, economic growth, media freedom, environmental protection, intercultural cooperation and scientific cooperation/education & training. The CEI implements its activities through cooperative activities, such as Working Groups, EU-projects, Know-how exchange programme and technical cooperation with the European Bank for Reconstruction and Development (EBRD). Each working group is chaired by a different country and has a unique focus. Since 2019, Roberto Antonione (Italy) has been the secretary general.

== CEI Presidencies ==
Year	Country
2026	Romania
2025	Serbia
2024	Albania
2023	Moldova
2022	Bulgaria
2021	Montenegro (due to covid related cancellation of most of the 2020 program)
2020	Montenegro
2019	Italy
2018	Croatia
2017	Belarus
2016	Bosnia and Herzegovina
2015	Macedonia
2014	Austria
2013	Hungary
2012	Ukraine
2011	Serbia
2010	Montenegro
2009	Romania
2008	Moldova
2007	Bulgaria
2006	Albania
2005	Slovakia
2004	Slovenia
2003	Poland
2002	Macedonia
2001	Italy
2000	Hungary
1999	Czech Republic
1998	Croatia
1997	Bosnia and Herzegovina
1996	Austria
1995	Poland
1994	Italy
1993	Hungary
1992	Austria
1991	Yugoslavia
1990	Italy
1989	Hungary

== Membership ==
Founding members:

- Austria (1989-2018)
- Hungary (1989)
- Italy (1989)
- SFR Yugoslavia (1989–1992)

Joined later:

- Czechoslovakia (1990–1992)
- Poland (1991)
- Republic of Bosnia and Herzegovina (1992) → Bosnia and Herzegovina
- Croatia (1992)
- Slovenia (1992)
- Czech Republic (1993)
- Macedonia (1993) → North Macedonia
- Slovakia (1993)
- Albania (1995)
- Belarus (1995) (suspended)
- Bulgaria (1995)
- Romania (1995)
- Ukraine (1995)
- Moldova (1996)
- FR Yugoslavia (2000) → Serbia and Montenegro → Serbia
- Montenegro (2006)

== See also ==
- Central Europe
- Craiova Group
- Open Balkan
- Southeastern Europe
- Southeast European Cooperation Process (SEECP)
- Central European Free Trade Agreement (CEFTA)
- Southeast European Cooperative Initiative (SECI)
- Black Sea Economic Co-operation (BSEC)
- Regional Cooperation Council (RCC)
- Visegrád Group (V4)
- Three Seas Initiative (TSI)
- Group of Nine
