= Stability Pact =

Stability Pact may refer to:

- Stability and Growth Pact, to facilitate and maintain the stability of the Economic and Monetary Union of the European Union
- Stability Pact for Southeastern Europe, an institution aimed at strengthening peace, democracy, human rights and economy in the countries of South Eastern Europe 1999–2008
