= Hidajet Biščević =

Croatian diplomat

Secretary General of the Regional Cooperation Council
- In office 1 January 2008 – 31 December 2012
- Succeeded by: Goran Svilanović

Personal details
- Born: 18 September 1951 (age 74) Sarajevo, PR Bosnia and Herzegovina, FPR Yugoslavia
- Education: University of Zagreb (Faculty of Political Sciences)
- Profession: Journalist, diplomat, author

Hidajet "Hido" Biščević (born 18 September 1951 in Sarajevo) is a Croatian diplomat, former Secretary General of the Regional Cooperation Council. Since 2020, he is working as Croatia's ambassador to Serbia.

Of Bosniak descent, he is also a journalist, having been editor-in-chief of the Vjesnik daily from 1990 to 1992, and their foreign affairs editor from 1985 to 1989, as well as an author of several books on international relations, concerning the breakup of Yugoslavia, the Iranian Revolution and the Iran–Iraq War.

Biščević graduated from the Faculty of Political Sciences at the University of Zagreb. After working at the state-owned Vjesnik daily newspaper in the 1980s and early 1990s, Biščević joined the Croatian diplomatic service in 1992, and was initially named Head of Department for Asian and Arab Countries at the Croatian Ministry of Foreign Affairs and Adviser to the Foreign Minister.

From 1993 to 1995, he was Croatia's ambassador to Turkey, after which he was appointed as Assistant Minister for Foreign Affairs (1995–97), before serving as ambassador to Russia (1997–2002). Upon returning from Moscow, he served as the State Secretary for Political Affairs at the Ministry of Foreign Affairs from 2003 to 2007.

On 10 May 2007, at the Southeast European Cooperation Process (SEECP) Foreign Ministers summit in Zagreb, he was appointed the first Secretary General of the newly established Regional Cooperation Council (RCC), and his term officially began on 1 January 2008.

From 2014 to 2018, he served as European Union ambassador to Tajikistan.

== Selected works ==
- EU for YOU - Functioning of the EU (Croatian Edition 2006, with Wolfgang Böhm and Otmar Lahodynsky)
- Strategija kaosa (English: Strategy of Chaos), ISBN 86-7125-053-9 (1989)
- U ime Alaha (English: In the Name of Allah), ISBN 86-349-0109-2 (1987)
- Krv na vodi (English: Blood on the Water), ISBN 86-409-0030-2 (1987)
