= Vladica Maričić =

Serbian politician

Vladica Maričić (Serbian Cyrillic: Владица Маричић; born 12 March 1987) is a politician in Serbia. He has served in the National Assembly of Serbia since 2020 as a member of the Serbian Progressive Party.

== Early life and career ==
Maričić was born in Niš, in what was then the Socialist Republic of Serbia in the Socialist Federal Republic of Yugoslavia. He has a master's degree in law from the University of Niš and is pursuing a doctorate in law at the same institution.

== Politician ==
Maričić has been the Progressive Party's commissioner for the Niš community of Delijski Vis. He began his political career at the municipal level, receiving the twenty-sixth position on the party's electoral list for the Niš city assembly in the 2012 Serbian local elections. The list won seventeen mandates, and he was not initially elected. He was subsequently given the 184th position (out of 250) on the party's list in the 2014 Serbian parliamentary election. The list won 158 mandates, and he was again not returned.

He was awarded a mandate for the Niš city assembly in either late 2014 or early 2015, after the resignation of another party member from that body. He served until 2016. He was given the thirty-eighth position on the party's list in the 2016 local elections and was not re-elected when the list won twenty-eight seats.

=== Parliamentarian ===
Maričić was given the 147th position on the Progressive Party's Aleksandar Vučić — For Our Children list in the 2020 Serbian parliamentary election and was elected when the list won a landslide majority with 188 mandates. He is now a member of the assembly committee on education, science, technological development, and the information society; a deputy member of the committee on the judiciary, public administration, and local self-government; a deputy member of the committee on labour, social issues, social inclusion, and poverty reduction; a member of the subcommittee on the information society and digitalization; a deputy member of Serbia's delegation to the South-East European Cooperation Process parliamentary assembly; the leader of Serbia's parliamentary friendship group with Sao Tome and Principe; and a member of the parliamentary friendship groups with Austria, Azerbaijan, Bosnia and Herzegovina, Bulgaria, China, Croatia, France, Hungary, Israel, Montenegro, North Macedonia, and the countries of Sub-Saharan Africa.
