= Summit of Ohrid 2013 =

The Summit of Ohrid 2013 was a planned meeting of political leaders of countries in South Eastern Europe as well as representatives of the United Nations and the European Union that would be held on 1 June in the Macedonian city of Ohrid. On 29 May the President of the Republic of Macedonia Gjorge Ivanov in a press in the President's residence Villa Vodno made a statement that he would cancel the international meeting because of the forgive mixing of Balkan nationalism and prejudices.

Macedonia has acted fully in line with the SEECP regulations. Unfortunately, old Balkan prejudices and complexes have surfaced in the run-up to the summit and I will not let Macedonia pay the price. We have been preparing for this summit all year and we have done everything to bring all leaders from the region to the same table.

— Gjorge Ivanov, President of Macedonia

Before the cancellation of the Summit all of the Balkan countries political leaders were invited. At first all of the countries have accepted the invitation except Greece. Following Greece, the Bulgarian President Rosen Plevneliev made a statement that he also would not attend the Summit, but Bulgaria would be represented by Marin Raykov. The last one to reject the invitation was the President of Albania Bujar Nishani who stated that he did so because leaders from the Republic of Kosovo weren't attending.

The Republic of Kosovo wasn't invited under the objection of Serbia, Bosnia-Herzegovina, and Romania who don't recognise the disputed country. But Albania and Croatia said that they would not attend without Kosovo. EU Delegation head Vincent Degert said that the South-East European Cooperation Process is not covered in the Brussels agreement between Belgrade and Pristina.

This was supposed to be the 16th Meeting of Presidents of Central European States after the Ohrid Summit 2008. Among those who accepted the invitation to the meeting were: President of Croatia Ivo Josipović, President of Moldova Nicolae Timofti, President of Montenegro Filip Vujanović, President of Romania Traian Băsescu, President of Serbia Tomislav Nikolić, President of Slovenia Borut Pahor, President of Bosnia and Herzegovina Nebojša Radmanović, the Minister of Foreign Affairs of Turkey Ahmet Davutoğlu, and also the President of the United Nations General Assembly Vuk Jeremić and the European Commissioner for Enlargement and European Neighbourhood Policy Štefan Füle.
