= Organization of the Black Sea Economic Cooperation =

International organization

- Formation: 25 June 1992
- Type: Economic cooperation organization
- Headquarters: Istanbul, Turkey
- Location(s): Eastern Europe; Southeastern Europe; Western Asia
- Members: 13 member countries: Albania; Armenia; Azerbaijan; Bulgaria; Georgia; Greece; Moldova; North Macedonia; Romania; Russia; Serbia; Turkey; Ukraine; 14 observer countries: Austria; Belarus; Croatia; Czech Republic; Egypt; France; Germany; Hungary; Israel; Italy; Poland; Slovakia; Tunisia; United States; 5 sectoral dialogue partner countries: Iran; Japan; Montenegro; Slovenia; South Korea
- Secretary General: (Romania) Lazăr Comănescu
- Website: www.bsec-organization.org

The Organization of the Black Sea Economic Cooperation (BSEC) is a regional international organization focusing on multilateral political and economic initiatives aimed at fostering cooperation, peace, stability and prosperity in the Black Sea region. It traces its origin to 25 June 1992, when Turkish President Turgut Özal and leaders of ten other countries gathered in Istanbul and signed the Summit Declaration and the "Bosphorus Statement". BSEC Headquarters – the Permanent International Secretariat of the Organization of the Black Sea Economic Cooperation (BSEC PERMIS) – was established in March 1994, also in Istanbul.

With the entry into force of its Charter on 1 May 1999, BSEC acquired international legal identity and was transformed into a full-fledged regional economic organization: Organization of the Black Sea Economic Cooperation. With the accession of Serbia (then Serbia and Montenegro) in April 2004, the Organization’s Member States increased to twelve. North Macedonia's accession in 2020 increased the organization's membership to thirteen.

An important aspect of the activities of BSEC is the development of SME and entrepreneurship in the member countries. Concerning these issues, a series of workshops have been organized in cooperation with Konrad Adenauer Foundation and ERENET.

== Membership ==
BSEC member states BSEC observer states

=== Member nations ===
Arms	Flag	Name	Area (km^{2})	Population	Population density (per km^{2})	Capital	Official language
Albania	(Albania)	Albania	28,748	2,751,025	95.7	Tirana	Albanian
Armenia	(Armenia)	Armenia	29,743	2,930,915	98.5	Yerevan	Armenian
Azerbaijan	(Azerbaijan)	Azerbaijan	86,600	10,454,855	121	Baku	Azerbaijani
Bulgaria	(Bulgaria)	Bulgaria	110,910	6,667,659	60.1	Sofia	Bulgarian
Georgia (country)	(Georgia (country))	Georgia	69,700	3,804,642	54.6	Tbilisi	Georgian
Greece	(Greece)	Greece	131,957	9,897,115	75	Athens	Greek
Moldova	(Moldova)	Moldova	33,846	2,961,253	87.5	Chișinău	Romanian
North Macedonia	(North Macedonia)	North Macedonia	25,713	1,804,063	70.2	Skopje	Macedonian
Romania	(Romania)	Romania	238,397	18,800,605	78.8	Bucharest	Romanian
Russia	(Russia)	Russia	17,098,246	143,394,458	8.4	Moscow	Russian
Serbia	(Serbia)	Serbia	88,361	6,641,964	75.2	Belgrade	Serbian
	(Turkey)	Turkey	783,356	87,926,082	112	Ankara	Turkish
Ukraine	(Ukraine)	Ukraine	603,628	39,535,849	65.5	Kyiv	Ukrainian

Black Sea Economic Cooperation (zoom) members observers

=== Observer nations ===
- Austria
- Belarus
- Croatia
- Czech Republic
- Egypt
- France
- Germany
- Hungary
- Israel
- Italy
- Poland
- Slovakia
- Tunisia
- United States

=== Observer organizations ===
- International Black Sea Club
- Energy Charter Secretariat
- European Commission
- Black Sea Commission

=== Sectoral dialogue partner countries ===
- Iran
- Japan
- Montenegro
- South Korea
- Slovenia

=== Sectoral dialogue partner organizations ===
- Black and Azov Seas Ports Association (BASPA)
- Black Sea International Shipowners Association (BINSA)
- Black Sea Region Association of Shipbuilders and Shiprepairers (BRASS)
- Black Sea Universities Network (BSUN)
- Union of Road Transport Association in the Black Sea Economic Cooperation Region (BSEC-URTA)
- Conference of Peripheral Maritime Regions for Europe (CPMR)
- Danube Commission
- International Network for SMEs (INSME)
- World Tourism Organization

=== International organizations ===
- Eurasian Economic Union
- International Commission of TRACECA
- Interparliamentary Assembly on Orthodoxy
- Parliamentary Assembly of the Mediterranean
- The Central European Initiative
- United Nations
- United Nations Development Programme
- United Nations Economic Commission for Europe
- United Nations Industrial Development Organization
- World Bank
- World Trade Organization

== Structure ==
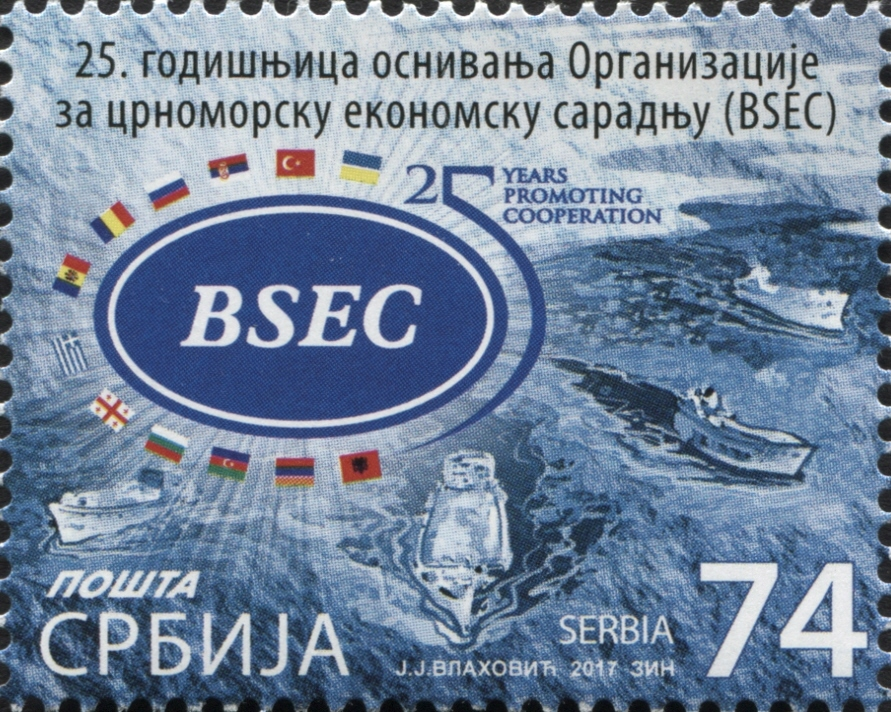
Commemorating 25th Anniversary of BSEC on 2017 post stamp of Serbia

- Summit Meetings of the Heads of State or Government of the Member States meets regularly every 5 years;
- Council of Ministers of Foreign Affairs is the main decision-making organ of BSEC, and meets twice a year;
- The Council of Ministers meets to achieve consensus on specific issues;
- The Committee of Senior Officials meets 4 times a year and acts on behalf of Ministers of Foreign Affairs;
- The Subsidiary Organs formed by the Council of Ministers of Foreign Affairs deal with their mandate defined by the Council, prepare joint projects and follow the implementation of these projects. Working Groups and Groups of Experts are the Subsidiary Organs;
- Chairmanship-in-Office coordinates all activities of BSEC, as well as, it controls the proper conduct of the activities of the organization and implementation of the Resolutions and Decisions adopted by the Council. In English alphabetical order, one of the Member States heads the Chairmanship-in-Office every 6 months. Chairmanship in BSEC is performed by Ukraine for the term of 1 July - 31 December 2017.

== Related bodies ==
Related bodies of BSEC carry out their functions due respect to the principles of BSEC defined in the Summit Declaration of 25 June 1992 and in the Charter. They have their own budget.

=== Parliamentary Assembly of the Black Sea Economic Cooperation (PABSEC) ===
The Parliamentary Assembly of the Black Sea Economic Cooperation based in Istanbul, is the inter-parliamentary consultative institution of the organization formed based on the Declaration on the Establishment of the Parliamentary Assembly of the Black Sea Economic Cooperation on February 26, 1993 by 9 founding states. Greece joined PABSEC in 1995, Bulgaria joined in 1997, and Serbia (former Serbia and Montenegro) joined in 2004.

Representatives of Parliaments of member countries pursue objectives which are stated in the preamble of the PABSEC Rules and Procedures: insure the understanding and adoption of the ideas and objectives of BSEC; provide a legal basis for social, economic, cultural, commercial and political cooperation among the member states; provide support to the national parliaments to reinforce the parliamentary democracy; pass the legislation required for the implementation of the decisions adopted by the Heads of States or by the Ministers of Foreign Affairs.

Main bodies of PABSEC are General Assembly, Standing Committee, the Bureau, Committees, the President, the Secretary General, and the International Secretariat. The Assembly is composed of 76 members. English, French, Russian and Turkish are the working languages of PABSEC.

The President of PABSEC is Archil Talakvadze from Georgia, the Vice-President is Anush Beghloyan from Armenia.

=== Black Sea Economic Cooperation Organization Business Council (BSEC BC) ===
The Black Sea Economic Cooperation Organization Business Council was formed in 1992 as an international, non-governmental and non-profit organization to strengthen the improvement of the business environment within Black Sea region. Business Council represents the business communities of member states. The International Secretariat of Business Council is based in Istanbul.

=== Black Sea Trade and Development Bank (BSTDB) ===
The Black Sea Trade and Development Bank (BSTDB) is an international financial institution that was formed 24 January 1997. It supports economic development and regional cooperation by providing trade and project financing, guarantees, and equity for development projects supporting both public and private enterprises in its member countries. Objectives of the bank include promoting regional trade links, cross country projects, foreign direct investment, supporting activities that contribute to sustainable development, with an emphasis on the generation of employment in the member countries, ensuring that each operation is economically and financially sound and contributes to the development of a market orientation. The organization has an authorized capital of $1.325 billion. The bank's headquarters are located in Thessaloniki, Greece.

BSTDB is governed by the Agreement Establishing Black Sea Trade and Development Bank, a United Nations registered treaty. Unlike the International Monetary Fund and others, the BSTDB does not attach policy conditions by which debtor states can be controlled. The Bank has a long term credit rating of 'A' from Moody's Investors Service and an 'A3' from Standard & Poor's, both with a stable outlook.

=== International Center for Black Sea Studies (ICBSS) ===
The International Center for Black Sea Studies is an independent think tank focused on the wider Black Sea region, which serves as a related body of BSEC at the same time. It was established in 1998.

=== BSEC Coordination Center for the Exchange of Statistical Data and Economic Information (BCCESDEI) ===
The BSEC Coordination Center for the Exchange of Statistical Data and Economic Information was established with the aim to collect statistical and economic information, accomplish secretarial functions, coordinate obtained data and share it with member countries.

== Working Groups ==
Member states are cooperating on different issues within the Working Groups. They are the following:

Working Groups of OBSEC
Working Groups on	Country Coordinator	Term
Agriculture and Agro-Industry	Turkey	1 July 2023 - 30 June 2025
Banking and Finance	Russia	1 January 2020 - 31 December 2021
Combatting Crime	Romania	1 January 2018 - 31 December 2020
Culture	Armenia	1 July 2023 - 30 June 2025
Customs Matters	pending	
Education	Russia	1 January 2020 - 31 December 2021
Emergency Assistance	Romania	1 July 2023 - 30 June 2025
Energy	Azerbaijan	1 July 2023 - 30 June 2025
Environmental Protection	Romania	1 January 2019 - 31 December 2020
Exchange of Statistical Data and Economic Information	pending	
Healthcare and Pharmaceutics	Romania	1 July 2018 - 30 June 2020
Information and Communication Technologies	Bulgaria	1 January 2020 - 31 December 2021
Institutional Renewal and Good Governance	Azerbaijan	1 July 2023 - 30 June 2025
Science and Technology	Turkey	1 July 2023 – 30 June 2024
SMEs	Bulgaria	1 January 2024 - 31 December 2025
Tourism	Azerbaijan	1 January 2023 - 31 December 2024
Trade and Economic Development	Turkey	1 July 2018 - 30 June 2020
Transport	Ukraine	1 January 2023 - 31 December 2024

The functions of Working Groups, of which country coordinators have not been appointed yet, are performed temporarily by the PERMIS.

== See also ==
- Black Sea Forum for Partnership and Dialogue
- Black Sea Trade and Development Bank (BSTDB)
- Black Sea trade and economy
- Central European Free Trade Agreement (CEFTA)
- Central European Initiative (CEI)
- EU Med Group
- International Center for Black Sea Studies (ICBSS)
- Southeast European Cooperation Process (SEECP)
- Southeast European Cooperative Initiative (SECI)
- Southeast Europe Transport Community
- Stability Pact for Southeastern Europe (SP for SEE)

== Notes ==
Joined as Serbia and Montenegro in April 2004; BSEC membership was inherited by Serbia after the country dissolved in 2006.
