= Stability Pact for Southeastern Europe =

Institution aimed at strengthening peace in Southeastern Europe (1999–2008)

- Logo

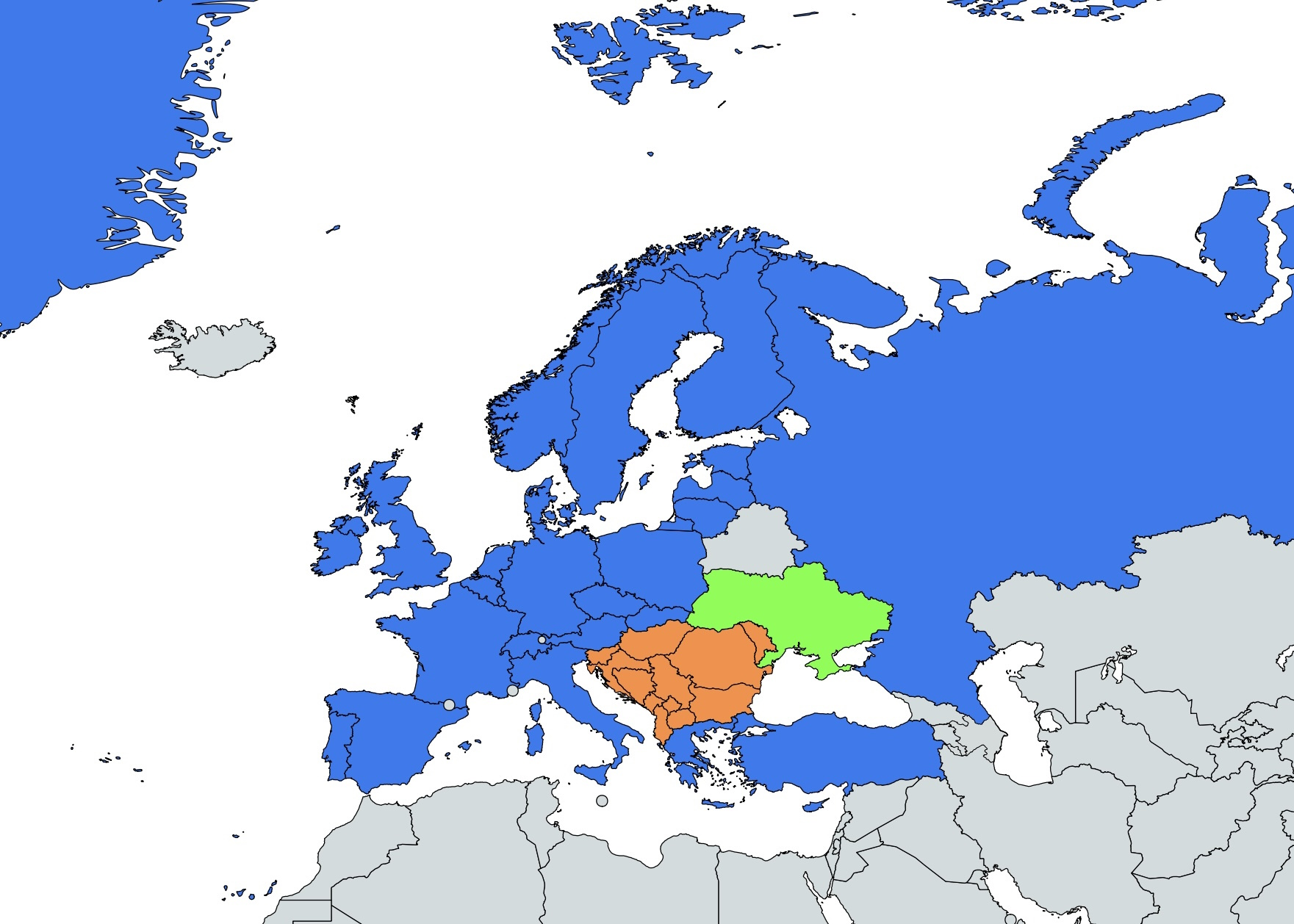
- Stability Pact member states Members Observers Supporting partners
- Type: Intergovernmental organisation
- Membership: 11 member countries: Albania; Bosnia and Herzegovina; Bulgaria; Croatia; Hungary; Moldova; Montenegro; North Macedonia; Romania; Serbia; Slovenia; 1 observer country: Ukraine; 7 supporting partner countries: European Union; Japan; Norway; Russia; Switzerland; Turkey; United States

Establishment
  - Founded: 10 June 1999
  - Disbanded: 28 February 2008

The Stability Pact for Southeastern Europe was an institution aimed at strengthening peace, democracy, human rights and economy in the countries of South Eastern Europe from 1999 to 2008. It was replaced by the Regional Cooperation Council (RCC) in February 2008. The RCC replaced it because it is more "regionally owned" than the Stability Pact, which was driven more by outside partners such as the EU.

== Membership ==
- Member partners:
  - Albania
  - Bosnia and Herzegovina
  - Bulgaria
  - Croatia
  - Hungary
  - Moldova
  - Montenegro
  - North Macedonia
  - Romania
  - Serbia
  - Slovenia
- Observer:
  - Ukraine
- Supporting partners:
  - Japan
  - Norway
  - Russia
  - Turkey
  - Switzerland
  - United States
  - European Union
  - European Bank for Reconstruction and Development
  - European Investment Bank
  - European Commission
  - Council of Europe
  - United Nations High Commissioner for Refugees (UNHCHR)
  - International Monetary Fund
  - North Atlantic Treaty Organization
  - Organisation for Economic Co-operation and Development
  - United Nations

== Creation ==
The pact was created at the initiative of the European Union on June 10, 1999, in Cologne. All of the countries of the region, except for Serbia and Montenegro (then FR Yugoslavia) and Moldova, were present at the founding conference. Representatives of Bulgaria, Romania, Russia, Turkey, United States, all members of the EU at the time, OSCE, Council of Europe and European Commission were also considered active participants.

Representatives of Canada, Japan, United Nations, UNHCR, NATO, OECD, Western European Union, International Monetary Fund, World Bank, European Investment Bank and European Bank for Reconstruction and Development were present as facilitators.

The pact was created following the escalation of Kosovo War; stability of Kosovo was among the primary objectives.

In 2006 it was announced that the Stability Pact should be succeeded in early 2008 by a more regionally owned co-operation framework, the Regional Cooperation Council (RCC) formed by the countries of the region themselves, but with continued support and advice from the international community. The South-East European Cooperation Process should be playing an important role in this process.

The last meeting of the SPSEE took place on 28 February 2008, in Sofia, Bulgaria when it was succeeded by the Regional Cooperation Council.

== Organization ==
The Special Coordinator was a head of the Stability Pact. The first Special Coordinator was Bodo Hombach. Since 2002, the position was held by Erhard Busek.

The pact was divided among three Working Tables, with the fourth, Regional Working Table, coordinating actions between them.

	Working Table 1	Working Table 2	Working Table 3
Chair	Goran Svilanović	Fabrizio Saccomanni	Janez Premoze
Director	Marijana Grandits	Mary O'Mahony	Pieter Verbeek
Main issues	Democratization and human rights: Rights of minorities; Freedom of media; Civil society; Rule of law and law enforcement; Institutions, administration and governance; Refugees	Economic reconstruction, development and cooperation: Promotion of free trade areas; International transport; Energy supply and savings; Deregulation and transparency; Infrastructure; Promotion of private sector business; Environmental issues; Reintegration of refugees	Security issues: Justice, home affairs and migration; Organized crime, corruption and terrorism; Transboundary environmental hazards; Cooperation on defence and military issues

Each of the Working Tables was responsible for a set of issues, working with participant countries' governments and NGOs on resolving them.

== Achievements ==
=== Working Table 1 ===
Consists of five task forces: Media, Education and Youth, Local Democracy and Cross Border Cooperation, Parliamentary Cooperation and Gender Issues.

Apart from its Director WT I relies on the work of two experts Srđan Cvijić and Talia Boati.

=== Working Table 2 ===
- Completed a matrix of bilateral free trade agreements (FTAs) between countries of the region.
  - Kosovo is also participating (represented by UNMIK as per UN Security Council resolution 1244), but not all FTAs with it are ready yet.
  - There is a proposal to unite the multiple FTAs (including full coverage of Kosovo) into a single free trade area (maybe by extension of Central European Free Trade Agreement). Agreement was due to be signed by the first half of 2006.
- Formation of a South-East Europe Regional Energy Market for electricity and natural gas. Participating are the member partners of the pact (without Moldova) as well as Greece and Turkey.
  - This process was also enhanced by the recent creation of a common European Energy Community between the European Union and the countries participating in the pact (without Moldova) and Kosovo. Turkey has delayed its participation with six months, because of problems with implementation of the environment parts of the acquis communautaire. Moldova, Ukraine and Norway are expected to join later.

=== Working Table 3 ===
Working Table III deals with questions of both internal and external security. The aim is to establish a stable security environment in the region and to promote regional co-operation in fighting organised crime and corruption and on migration issues. It is divided into two sub-tables. The first one deals with Justice and Home Affairs and the second one with Defence and Security Sector Reform issues.

== FTA progress (until February 2008) ==
Matrix of the Free Trade Agreements in the region.
	European Union associated			Other Stability pact partners (to be merged into CEFTA)							Other European Neighbourhood Policy partners			
	EU	EFTA	Turkey CU	Croatia	Republic of North Macedonia	Albania	Bosnia and Herzegovina	Serbia and Montenegro	Kosovo	Moldova	Ukraine	Georgia	Armenia	Azerbaijan
EU		FTA 1973	CU 1996	SAA 2005	SAA 2004	SAA	SAA	SAA	STM					
EFTA	FTA 1973		FTA 1992	FTA 2002	FTA 2001				?					
Turkey CU	CU 1996	FTA 1992		FTA 2003	FTA 2000		FTA 2003	?	?					
Croatia	SAA 2005	FTA 2002	FTA 2003		SEE-FTA 2002; CEFTA 2006	SEE-FTA 2003	SEE-FTA 2005	SEE-FTA 2004	SEE-FTA 2006	SEE-FTA 2004				
Republic of North Macedonia	SAA 2004	FTA 2001	FTA 2000	SEE-FTA 2002; CEFTA 2006		SEE-FTA 2002	SEE-FTA 2002	SEE-FTA 2006	SEE-FTA 2006	SEE-FTA 2005				
Albania	SAA			SEE-FTA 2003	SEE-FTA 2002		SEE-FTA 2004	SEE-FTA 2004	SEE-FTA 2003	SEE-FTA 2004				
Bosnia and Herzegovina	SAA		FTA 2003	SEE-FTA 2005	SEE-FTA 2002	SEE-FTA 2004		SEE-FTA 2002	SEE-FTA 2006	SEE-FTA 2004				
Serbia and Montenegro	SAA		?	SEE-FTA 2004	SEE-FTA 2006	SEE-FTA 2004	SEE-FTA 2002			SEE-FTA 2004				
Kosovo	STM	?	?	SEE-FTA 2006	SEE-FTA 2006	SEE-FTA 2003	SEE-FTA 2006			?				
Moldova				SEE-FTA 2004	SEE-FTA 2005	SEE-FTA 2004	SEE-FTA 2004	SEE-FTA 2004	?				FTA 1995	
Ukraine												FTA 1996	FTA 1996	
Georgia											FTA 1996		FTA 1998	FTA 1996
Armenia										FTA 1995	FTA 1996	FTA 1998		
Azerbaijan												FTA 1996		

instrument and year of entry into force
instrument and year of provisional entry into force
in negotiations
strained diplomatic relations over Kosovo (SiM–UNMIK), Nagorno-Karabakh (Armenia–Azerbaijan, Armenia–Turkey) and the Armenian genocide (Armenia–Turkey)

== See also ==
- Eastern Partnership
- European Union Association Agreement
- European Neighbourhood Policy
- Euro-Mediterranean free trade area
- EU Strategy for the South Caucasus
- South-East European Cooperation Process (SEECP)
- Central European Free Trade Agreement (CEFTA)
- Central European Initiative (CEI)
- Southeast European Cooperative Initiative (SECI)
- Black Sea Economic Co-operation (BSEC)
- Southeast Europe Transport Community
- Potential enlargement of the European Union
