= International Black Sea Club =

Organization

The International Black Sea Club is an international non-governmental organization uniting several cities on the Black Sea and in its vicinity. It has observer status in the Organization of the Black Sea Economic Cooperation and special consultative status in the United Nations Economic and Social Council. It was created in 1992 in Odesa, Ukraine and its current president is Ionut Pucheanu, the mayor of Galati City (Romania).

== Members ==
30 cities from 10 countries of the Black Sea region are members of IBSC, such as:

- Bulgaria - Burgas, Varna;
- Georgia - Poti, Batumi, Sokhumi (capital of Abkhazia);
- Greece - Piraeus, Thessaloniki, Kavala;
- Moldova - Tiraspol (capital of Transnistria);
- Romania - Constanţa, Galaţi;
- Russia - Azov, Taganrog, Rostov on Don, Tuapse, Anapa, Temryuk District;
- Turkey - Trabzon, Samsun, Izmit;
- Ukraine - Odesa, Mykolaiv, Sevastopol, Chornomorsk, Kherson, Pivdenne, Mariupol, Yalta, Feodosia.
