= ERENET =

Research and development network

ERENET (Entrepreneurship Research and Education NETwork of Central European Universities) is an open-ended research and development network aiming at carrying out research on entrepreneurship and developing entrepreneurial curricula and teaching materials among the Central- and Eastern European high-schools and academic universities. The network is based on a partnership relation among its members.

ERENET logo

== History ==
ERENET was established in 2005 at the initiative of Péter Szirmai (1947-2013), among others, following the suggestion of the Expert Meeting on "Good Governance for SMEs" organized in April 2004 by the United Nations Economic Commission for Europe. The network is moderated by Antal Szabó. Currently, ERENET has 190 academic members from 43 countries.

== Aims of ERENET and its main fields of activities ==
In order to realise its objectives, the network has undertaken the following actions:

- Creation of an international network of higher education on teaching and investigating entrepreneurship
- Providing exchange of information, making each other acquainted with their curriculum and research
- Elaboration and implementation of common research projects
- Collect best practices on entrepreneurial education, elaborate new syllabus and curriculum on entrepreneurship
- Provide policy advice in the field of national entrepreneurship and SME policies, especially in such regions as Central and Eastern Europe, Black Sea Economic Cooperation, and South-Eastern Europe
- Organising conferences, workshops, seminars in the field of entrepreneurship and SME-development issues, e.g. for the Organization of the Black Sea Economic Cooperation in cooperation with Konrad Adenauer Foundation, in cooperation with European Council of Small Business and Entrepreneurship (ECSB), etc.
- Promotion of exchange of their professors, researchers, and possibly students
- Develop an Internet-based quarterly publication called ERENET Profile which is collected in the Library of Congress as a reliable information source on enterprise development in Eastern and South Eastern Europe.

== Legal status ==
According to international practice, ERENET is an international unregistered non-profit non-governmental organization. Members participate in specific projects, support each other's events, and contribute with their scientific research results and publications to common intellectual capital. The coordination of the international network is undertaken by the Hungarian membership organisation. The managing agent (called Permanent Secretariat) is the Small Business Development Centre at the Corvinus University of Budapest. The network is moderated and the activities are organized by the Scientific Director of the ERENET. In 2009, the Institut Ekonomskih Nauka (Institute for Economic Sciences, Belgrade) became the ERENET South-Eastern Secretariat. The Plenary Organization is the Annual Meeting. ERENET has an executive board which consists of the members of the International Board of the periodical ERENET Profile. There is no membership fee in the network. The free of charge membership significantly contributed that members from the CIS and SEE countries could join ERENET.
