= Regional Cooperation Council =

Southeastern European intergovernmental organization

- Logo

- Participating South-East European states
- Headquarters: Sarajevo
- Type: Intergovernmental organization
- Participants: 46

Leaders
  - Secretary General: Amer Kapetanovic

Establishment
  - RCC established: 2008
- Website https://www.rcc.int/home

The Regional Cooperation Council is a cooperation framework established in 2008 to facilitate cooperation and development in South Eastern Europe. Its secretariat is based in Sarajevo, Bosnia and Herzegovina.

== Background ==
The Regional Cooperation Council was established at a 2008 meeting of foreign affairs ministers from the South-East European Cooperation Process to supersede the Stability Pact for Southeastern Europe. The organization was founded by SEECP participants and is funded in part by the European Union to further promote European integration and cooperation. The RCC is led by a Secretary-General, currently Amer Kapetanovic and consists of 46 participants. Participants are made up of the SEECP countries, along with other countries and supranational organizations who are interested in the stability and development of the region.

A major project of the RCC is the development of the Regional Economic Area (REA), to better integrate South East European economies. The status of the REA had been uncertain with competing integration projects like the 2019 Open Balkan initiative. However on 2 July 2023, Albanian prime minister Edi Rama stated the Open Balkans project is over and the countries will revert back to the Berlin Process.

== Participants ==
South-East European states

- Albania
- Bosnia and Herzegovina
- Bulgaria
- Croatia
- Greece
- Kosovo
- Moldova
- Montenegro
- North Macedonia
- Romania
- Serbia
- Slovenia
- Turkey

Other states

- Austria
- Canada
- Czech Republic
- Denmark
- Germany
- Finland
- France
- Hungary
- Ireland
- Italy
- Latvia
- Norway
- Poland
- Slovakia
- Spain
- Sweden
- Switzerland
- United Kingdom

Organisations

- Council of Europe
- Council of Europe Development Bank
- European Bank for Reconstruction and Development
- European Investment Bank
- European Union
- International Organization for Migration
- North Atlantic Treaty Organization
- Organization for Security and Co-operation in Europe
- Organisation for Economic Co-operation and Development
- Southeast European Cooperative Initiative
- United Nations
- United Nations Development Programme
- United Nations Economic Commission for Europe
- World Bank

Former participants

- United States (withdrew in 2026)

== Structure ==
=== Leadership ===
List of Secretaries General

- Hido Biščević (2008-2012)
- Goran Svilanović (2013-2018)
- Majlinda Bregu (2019-2024)
- Amer Kapetanovic (2025-present)

== See also ==
- South-East European Cooperation Process
- Stability Pact for Southeastern Europe
- Central European Initiative
