= Stabilisation and Association Process =

Part of the process of joining the European Union

Map of the states which have participated in the European Union's Stabilisation and Association Process, with the date of entry into force of its Stabilization and Association Agreement (and the date of lapse of the agreement for Croatia when it became an EU member state). EU member states SAA in force

In talks with countries that have expressed a wish to join the European Union, the EU typically concludes Association Agreements in exchange for commitments to political, economic, trade, or human rights reform in that country. In exchange, the country may be offered tariff-free access to some or all EU markets (industrial goods, agricultural products, etc.), and financial or technical assistance.

== Overview ==
Stabilisation and Association agreements are part of the EU Stabilisation and Association Process (SAP) and European Neighbourhood Policy (ENP). At present, the countries of the Western Balkans are the focus of the SAP. Specific Stabilisation and Association Agreements (SAA) have been implemented with various Balkan countries which explicitly include provisions for future EU membership of the country involved. SAAs are similar in principle to the Europe Agreements signed with the Central and Eastern European countries in the 1990s and to the Association Agreement with Turkey.

SAAs require some amount of harmonization of the EU's acquis communautaire (the accumulation of EU law) into the domestic law of cooperating states, but less so than for EU member states. Some policy areas in the acquis may not be covered at all by a given SAA. To monitor and supervise a SAA, joint bodies between the EU and Western Balkan partners are established, the so called Stabilisation and Association (SA) Committees.

The EU's relations with the Western Balkans states were moved from the "External Relations" to the "Enlargement" EU directorate in 2005. As of 2022, Albania, Bosnia and Herzegovina, North Macedonia, Montenegro and Serbia are officially recognized as candidates for membership. Kosovo is not recognised as a candidate country, but as a potential candidate.

As of April 2016, Albania, Bosnia and Herzegovina, Kosovo, North Macedonia, Montenegro and Serbia have SAAs in force. Croatia formerly had a SAA, but it lapsed when they acceded to the EU in 2013.

The agreement with Kosovo was the first signed after the entry into force of the Lisbon treaty, which conferred a legal personality to the EU. As a result, an EU representative in Kosovo explained that "unlike SAA with other countries of the region, this one will be exclusively the EU agreement. The EU will co-sign it as a legal entity." The agreement did not need to be individually ratified by each member state, some of which have not recognized the independence of Kosovo. The representative went on to say that "since Kosovo is not recognized by the five member states, we had to issue a directive saying that the signing of the agreement will not signify that the EU or any of the countries recognize Kosovo as a state."

== Stabilisation and Association Process ==
Event	North Macedonia	Croatia	Albania	Montenegro (Note: Montenegro started negotiations in November 2005 while a part of Serbia and Montenegro. Separate technical negotiations were conducted regarding issues of sub-state organizational competency. A mandate for direct negotiations with Montenegro was established in July 2006. Direct negotiations were initiated on 26 September 2006 and concluded on 1 December 2006.)	Bosnia and Herzegovina	Serbia (Note: Serbia started negotiations in November 2005 while part of Serbia and Montenegro, with a modified mandate from July 2006.)	Kosovo (Note: Kosovo declared independence from Serbia in 2008 but is still claimed by Serbia as part of its territory. The European Union remains divided, with five EU member states not recognizing its independence. The EU launched a Stabilisation Tracking Mechanism for Kosovo on 6 November 2002 with the aim of aligning its policy with EU standards. On 10 October 2012 the European Commission found that there were no legal obstacles to Kosovo signing a SAA with the EU, as independence is not required for such an agreement.)
SAA negotiations start	2000-04-05	2000-11-24	2003-01-31	2005-10-10	2005-11-25	2005-10-10	2013-10-28
SAA initialled	2000-11-24	2001-05-14	2006-02-28	2007-03-15	2007-12-04	2007-11-07	2014-07-25
SAA/IA signature	2001-04-09	2001-10-29	2006-06-12	2007-10-15	2008-06-16	2008-04-29	2015-10-27
Interim Agreement:
EC ratification	2001-04-27	2002-01-30	2006-06-12	2007-10-15	2008-06-16	2009-12-08	N/A (Note: No Interim Agreement associated with Kosovo's SAA was concluded.)
SAP state ratification	2001-04-27	2002-01-30	2006-10-09	2007-11-14	2008-06-20	2008-09-22	N/A
entry into force	2001-06-01	2002-03-01	2006-12-01	2008-01-01	2008-07-01	2010-02-01	N/A
Deposit of the instrument of ratification:
SAP state	2001-04-27	2002-01-30	2006-11-09	2007-11-13	2009-02-26	2008-09-22	2016-02-26
Austria	2002-09-06	2002-03-15	2008-05-21	2008-07-04	2009-09-04	2011-01-13	N/A
Belgium	2003-12-29	2003-12-17	2008-10-22	2010-03-29	2010-03-29	2012-03-20	N/A
Bulgaria	joined the EU later			2008-05-30	2009-03-13	2010-08-12	N/A
Croatia	joined the EU later						N/A
Cyprus	joined the EU later		2008-05-30	2008-11-20	2009-07-02	2010-11-26	N/A
Czech Republic	joined the EU later		2008-05-07	2009-02-19	2009-07-23	2011-01-28	N/A
Denmark	2002-04-10	2002-05-08	2008-04-24	2008-06-25	2009-05-26	2011-03-04	N/A
Estonia	joined the EU later		2007-10-17	2007-11-22	2008-09-11	2010-08-19	N/A
Finland	2004-01-06	2004-01-06	2007-11-29	2009-03-18	2009-04-07	2011-10-21	N/A
France	2003-06-04	2003-06-04	2009-02-12	2009-07-30	2011-02-10	2012-01-16	N/A
Germany	2002-06-20	2002-10-18	2009-02-19	2009-11-16	2009-08-14	2012-02-24	N/A
Greece	2003-08-27	2003-08-27	2009-02-26	2010-03-04	2010-09-20	2011-03-10	N/A
Hungary	joined the EU later		2007-04-23	2008-05-14	2008-10-22	2010-11-16	N/A
Ireland	2002-05-06	2002-05-06	2007-06-11	2009-06-04	2009-06-04	2011-09-29	N/A
Italy	2003-10-30	2004-10-06	2008-01-07	2009-10-13	2010-09-08	2011-01-06	N/A
Latvia	joined the EU later		2006-12-19	2008-10-17	2009-11-12	2011-05-30	N/A
Lithuania	joined the EU later		2007-05-17	2009-03-04	2009-05-04	2013-06-26	N/A
Luxembourg	2003-07-28	2003-08-01	2007-07-04	2009-06-11	2010-12-22	2011-01-21	N/A
Malta	joined the EU later		2008-04-21	2008-12-11	2010-01-07	2010-07-06	N/A
Netherlands	2002-09-09	2004-04-30	2007-12-10	2009-01-29	2009-09-30	2012-02-27	N/A
Poland	joined the EU later		2007-04-14	2009-02-06	2010-04-07	2012-01-13	N/A
Portugal	2003-07-14	2003-07-14	2008-07-11	2008-09-23	2009-06-29	2011-03-04	N/A
Romania	joined the EU later			2009-01-15	2010-01-08	2012-05-22	N/A
Slovakia	joined the EU later		2007-07-20	2008-07-29	2009-03-17	2010-11-11	N/A
Slovenia	joined the EU later		2007-01-18	2008-02-07	2009-03-10	2010-12-07	N/A
Spain	2002-10-04	2002-10-04	2007-05-03	2009-03-12	2010-06-15	2010-06-21	N/A
Sweden	2002-06-25	2003-03-27	2007-03-21	2009-03-11	2009-09-14	2011-04-15	N/A
United Kingdom	2002-12-17	2004-09-03	2007-10-16	2010-01-12	2010-04-20	2011-08-11	N/A
European Communities or European Union and Euratom	2004-02-25	2004-12-21	2009-02-26	2010-03-29	2015-04-30	2013-07-22	2016-02-24 (Note: Kosovo's SAA was the first signed after the entry into force of the Lisbon treaty, which conferred a legal personality to the EU. As a result, unlike previous SAAs Kosovo's is exclusively between it and the EU and Euratom, and the member states are not parties independently.)
SAA entry into force	2004-04-01	2005-02-01	2009-04-01	2010-05-01	2015-06-01	2013-09-01	2016-04-01
EU membership (SAA lapsed)	(TBD)	2013-07-01	(TBD)	(TBD)	(TBD)	(TBD)	(TBD)

N/A: Not applicable.

== See also ==
- Central European Free Trade Agreement
- European Neighbourhood Policy
- European Union Association Agreement
- Free trade area
- Free trade agreements of the European Union
- Free trade agreements of the United Kingdom
- Potential enlargement of the European Union
- SAp country statistics
- Serbia–United Kingdom Partnership, Trade and Cooperation Agreement
- Stability Pact for South Eastern Europe (SP for SEE)
- Southeast Europe Transport Community
