= Southeast European Cooperative Initiative =

Multilateral organization

- Logo

- Southeast European Cooperative Initiative member states: members observers
- Headquarters: Vienna
- Type: Intergovernmental organization
- Membership: 13 member countries: Albania; Bosnia and Herzegovina; Bulgaria; Croatia; Greece; Hungary; Moldova; Montenegro; North Macedonia; Romania; Serbia; Slovenia; Turkey; 16 observer countries: Austria; Azerbaijan; Belgium; Canada; France; Georgia; Germany; Italy; Japan; Kosovo; Netherlands; Portugal; Spain; Ukraine; United Kingdom; United States
- Website; Official website

The Southeast European Cooperative Initiative (SECI) is a multilateral organization initiated by the United States and the European Union as a response to the Dayton Agreement.

It was established in December 1996 in Geneva on the basis of the Final Points of Common EU-USA Understanding, within the framework of the Organization for Security and Cooperation in Europe (OSCE).

Its member states include Albania, Bosnia and Herzegovina, Bulgaria, Croatia, Greece, Hungary, Moldova, North Macedonia, Romania, Slovenia, Serbia, Turkey and Montenegro. SECI's observer states are Austria, Azerbaijan, Belgium, Canada, France, Georgia, Germany, Italy, Japan, Netherlands, Portugal, Spain, Kosovo, Ukraine, United Kingdom and the United States of America as well as its observer organizations are the International Organization for Migration (IOM), European Institute for Law Enforcement Cooperation, renamed European Institute for Freedom, Security and Justice (EULEC), International Centre for Migration Policy Development (ICMPD) and the United Nations Mission in Kosovo (UNMIK).

SECI's purpose is to develop a sustainable economic strategy in and for the region and to focus on trans-border cooperation programs and projects in the fields of development of infrastructure, trade, traffic, security, energy, environment and the private sector. Providing regional peace and stability among the countries of Southeastern Europe through cooperative activities, the further integration of its member states into the European Union shall be facilitated through the support of main international organizations and observer states. The initiative has provided regional stability and peace since its founding in 1996.

In 1999, SECI, together with the Organization for Security and Cooperation in Europe (OSCE) under the then Chairman-in-Office, Norwegian Foreign Minister Knut Vollebaek, co-founded the Stability Pact for South Eastern Europe, renamed Regional Cooperation Council (RCC), owned and run by countries mainly in Southeast Europe, aiming at strengthening peace, democracy and the economy in the region to serve the regional cooperation and European and Euro-Atlantic integration of South East Europe in order to spark development in the region to the benefit of its people.

The same year, SECI founded the SECI Bucharest Center for Combating Transborder Crime and Corruption, later renamed Southeast European Law Enforcement Center (SELEC), which is concentrating on the cooperation to prevent and combat trans-border crime. The countries that signed and ratified the SECI agreement were Albania, Bosnia and Herzegovina, Bulgaria, Croatia, Greece, Hungary, Moldova, Montenegro, North Macedonia, Romania, Slovenia, Serbia and Turkey.

The SECI headquarters are located within the Hofburg Palace in Vienna.

== Membership ==
=== Member states ===
- Albania
- Bosnia and Herzegovina
- Bulgaria
- Croatia
- Greece
- Hungary
- Moldova
- Montenegro
- North Macedonia
- Romania
- Serbia
- Slovenia
- Turkey

=== Regional observer states ===
- Austria
- Azerbaijan
- Belgium
- France
- Georgia
- Germany
- Italy
- Kosovo
- Netherlands
- Portugal
- Spain
- Ukraine
- United Kingdom

=== Extra-regional observer states ===
- Canada
- Japan
- United States

=== Observer international organizations ===
- International Organization for Migration (IOM)
- European Institute for Law Enforcement Cooperation (EULEC)
- International Centre for Migration Policy Development (ICMPD)
- United Nations Mission in Kosovo (UNMIK)

== History ==
=== Background of SECI ===
The SECI was formed in 1996 under the guidance of Ambassador Richard Schifter, at the time the Senior Director for Eastern Europe in the United States National Security Council. The group's mission was modeled after the Marshall Plan of 1947, which helped rebuild Europe after World War II. Since the war in Bosnia and Herzegovina was coming to a close, Schifter saw a need for greater stability in the region. His initial plan, called the Southeast European Cooperative Development Initiative, was intended to focus on regional cooperation of the countries in Southeast Europe (SEE), and not be considered a financial assistance plan. The idea was to allow SEE countries access to resources that would help them rebuild and stabilize, but not to provide money. Instead, outside organizations and countries like the United States would offer technical assistance and provide experts on relevant subjects. Schifter's hunch was realized on 14 December 1995, when a cease-fire was announced and peace negotiations were signed in Dayton, Ohio under the Dayton Agreement.

The Participating States of the Southeast European Cooperative Initiative held an inaugural meeting in Geneva on December 5–6, 1996 and formally adopted the SECI “Statement of Purpose” on December 6, 1996, and its Annex I as well as the “Final Points of Common EU-US Understanding”, dated December 6, 1996, which define the legal status and form of SECI. The Participating states requested then OSCE Chairman-in-Office, Swiss Foreign Minister Flavio Cotti, to designate, after appropriate consultations, the High-Level Personality (HLP) referred to in the Statement of Purpose. On December 19, 1996, the OSCE Chairman-in-Office, as authorized by all OSCE Participating States, named Erhard Busek, former Vice-Chancellor of Austria, as SECI "High-Level Personality", hereinafter Coordinator.

=== The formation process ===
The next step was to get all the countries in the region together and agree to join a cooperation initiative, an extremely difficult task considering the ethnic tension that dominated the region. The SECI was originally composed of Albania, Bosnia and Herzegovina, Bulgaria, Macedonia, Greece, Hungary, Moldova, Romania, Turkey, Yugoslavia, Croatia and Slovenia. However those last three participants caused some growing pains for the initiative in its nascent stages. Yugoslavia's invitation was revoked after the country cancelled local election results when a minority party won the popular vote, eventually being allowed in as Serbia and Montenegro and Slovenia and Croatia originally agreed to join but only as observer nations. The Slovenian concern was that they were a Central European country, not part of SEE, but once Hungary joined, they quickly followed suit. Croatia was more of a challenge in that not only did they not see themselves as a SEE country, but President Tudjman in an interview with Richard Schifter said that Croatia was a “Catholic, Mediterranean country” that wants nothing to do with the “Orthodox and the Muslims.” In 1999, President Tudjman was hospitalized, eventually dying, and shortly after, Croatia joined the SECI as a full-fledged member. Kosovo is another area of contention for the SEE countries. During the time of the formation of the SECI, in 1996, they were only recognized as a region and by 1999, they were governed by the United Nations Interim Administration Mission in Kosovo (UNMIK), under the UNSC Resolution 1244; in February 2008, the Assembly of Kosovo declared its independence from Serbia. Despite this, they are still only recognized as an independent state by 118 UN member states, with Russia and Serbia leading the opposition of the declaration and the European Union having no official position on the situation as well as the United Nations saying that Resolution 1244 will remain the legal framework in Kosovo. Kosovo has never been and currently is not considered a member state by the SECI either, only a permanent observer.

=== SECI's mission ===
The South-East European Cooperative Initiative (SECI) is a multilateral regional initiative that has been initiated by the European Union, the United States of America and the countries of Southeast Europe within the Organization for Security and Cooperation in Europe (OSCE) as a support to the implementation of the Dayton Accords in December 1996 at the inaugural session at Geneva on the basis of Final Points of Common EU-USA Understanding.

SECI's purpose is to develop a sustainable economic strategy in and for the region and to focus on trans-border cooperation programs and projects in the fields of development of infrastructure, trade, traffic, security, energy, environment and the private sector. Its impetus is encouraging cooperation among its Participating States and facilitating their integration into European structures. SECI is not an assistance program. It does not interfere with, but rather complements with existing initiatives. SECI endeavours to promote close cooperation among the governments of the region and to create new channels of communication among them. Furthermore, SECI attempts to emphasize and coordinate regionwide planning, identify needed follow-up and missing links, provide for better involvement of the private sector in regional economic and environmental efforts, help to create a regional climate that encourages the transfer of know-how and greater investment in the private sector, and assist in harmonizing trade laws and policies.

According to its official mandate, SECI advises the EU-Commission, European Investment Bank (EIB), European Bank for Reconstruction and Development (EBRD) and governments of the member and observer states on business matters in Southeast Europe and request their intervention when necessary. Furthermore, it advises business communities ensuring an effective follow-up of recommendations as well as attracting investments and increasing trade with and among the members countries.

All SECI programs and projects are being implemented by experts from the member states and states supporting this Initiative with the technical support of the European Commission, UN Economic Commission for Europe (UN/ECE), World Bank, European Bank for Reconstruction and Development (EBRD), European Investment Bank (EIB), World Customs Organization and the OSCE. Also, SECI closely cooperates with the Regional Cooperation Council (RCC), Central European Initiative (CEI), Organization of the Black Sea Economic Cooperation, Central European Free Trade Agreement (CEFTA), International Sava River Basin Commission (ISRBC), Danube Commission (DC) and specialized UN agencies and programs and other organizations.

SECI Member states are: Austria, Albania, Bosnia and Herzegovina, Bulgaria, Croatia, Greece, Hungary, Moldova, North Macedonia, Montenegro, Romania, Slovenia, Serbia and Turkey. SECI Observers states are: Azerbaijan, Belgium, Canada, France, Georgia, Germany, Italy, Japan, Netherlands, Portugal, Spain, Kosovo, Ukraine, United Kingdom and United States.

The principal SECI goals are: elimination of administrative and other obstacles with a view to increasing efficiency in the flow of goods and improved trade, identification of bottlenecks at main international traffic corridors, creation of networks and zones of energy efficiency, investing in the promotion of networks of pipelines and their connections with international pipelines, provision of funds for the promotion of entrepreneurship, primarily through projects of small and medium-sized enterprises, etc.

The SECI initiative is guided by the Co-ordinator, which has been nominated by the OSCE. Its principal body is the Programme Committee comprising national coordinators of the Member Countries. It ensures that activities fulfil SECI's mission and acts as its representative to outside parties. This regional depth and experience ensure its ability to fully support its regional membership and engagement on regional issues.

=== Programme and project activities ===
SECI activities and projects include for example: • SECI Bucharest Center for Combating Transborder Crime and Corruption, renamed Southeast European Law Enforcement Center (SELEC); • Trade and Transport Facilitation in Southeast Europe (TTFSE); • Memorandum of Understanding on Road Transport (Athens MoU); • Memorandum of Understanding on the Facilitation of International Road Transport of Goods in the SECI Region (in cooperation with UNECE and the European Conference of Ministers of Transport (ECMT)); • Exchange of Information of Securities Markets in the SECI Countries; • Regional Transmission Planning in SECI Member Countries; • Policy facilitator within the framework of the Danube Cooperation Process (DCP); • Dialogue forum for interinstitutional and interdisciplinary communication with its Partnership for Improvement of Danube Infrastructure and Navigation (PIDIN); • Overall regional stakeholder, observer and promoter of cross-sectoral developments and trends within the Danube River Basin; • Coordination of the "Interim Save Commission"; • SECI Business Advisory Council (BAC); • European Economic Danube Forum (EEDF) and • Center for Democracy and Reconciliation in Southeast Europe (till 2019)

== See also ==
- Organization for Security and Cooperation in Europe (OSCE)
- Stability Pact for South Eastern Europe (SP for SEE)
- Regional Cooperation Council (RCC)
- European Commission (EC)
- UN Economic Commission for Europe (UN/ECE)
- World Bank (WB)
- European Bank for Reconstruction and Development (EBRD)
- European Investment Bank (EIB)
- World Customs Organization
- International Organization for Migration (IOM)
- European Institute for Law Enforcement Cooperation (EULEC)
- International Centre for Migration Policy Development (ICMPD)
- United Nations Mission to Kosovo (UNMIK)
- South-East European Cooperation Process (SEECP)
- Central European Free Trade Agreement (CEFTA)
- Central European Initiative (CEI)
- International Sava River Basin Commission (ISRBC)
- Danube Commission (DC)
- Black Sea Economic Co-operation (BSEC)
- Partnership for Peace Information Management System (PIMS) and South-Eastern Europe Defense Ministerial process (SEDM)
