= Stabilisation Tracking Mechanism =

EU body which polices the EU acceptance process for Kosovo

Stabilisation Tracking Mechanism is an alternative instrument of the Stabilisation and Association Process (SAP) for Kosovo. Kosovo, a disputed province of Serbia under international administration that in 2008 unilaterally declared independence and received partial recognition, still not having a final status, was not able to commence with SAP. To ensure that the United Nations Interim Administration Mission in Kosovo (UNMIK) and the Provisional Institutions of Self-Government (PISG) follow EU-compatible practices in the political, economic and sectoral reform process, UNMIK and the European Commission agreed that an instrument was needed to monitor and drive the process. Although developments within Kosovo are not only a matter of reform, it was deemed profitable for the PISG and UNMIK to follow the methodology and substance of the SAP and thus avoid isolation from the mainstream of European integration.

To that end, on 6 November 2002, the European Commission commenced the so-called Stabilisation and Association Process Tracking Mechanism (STM). The STM constitutes a parallel track to the EU's regular SAP and is intended to help the authorities in Kosovo to prepare for reinforced policy-making relations within the framework of the SAP. It will ensure that Kosovo is not isolated from the path of EU-compatible transition and development of Southeast Europe. The process aims at building an institutional, legislative, economic and social framework directed by the values and models subscribed to by the EU, as well as at promoting the transition to a market economy.

As of 2008 15 STM meetings have taken place, the latest in December 2008. The 6th STM meeting was held on 16 February 2005 in Priština. It was the first meeting with the newly elected government. For the first time, specific sector workshops on energy and economy were organised on the margin of the STM main meeting.

The 7th STM meeting took place on 3 May 2005 in Prishtina. Focus of the meeting was on the progress made on the Kosovo Action Plan for the Implementation of the European Partnership. Everybody considered the improvement of Kosovo's economic situation as being crucial for its development. Further emphasis was put on the significance of Kosovo's further regional integration, not solely as a means to enhance economic development, but also as an important contribution towards peace and stability throughout the region.

In June 2005 the Second Progress Report on the Kosovo Action Plan for the Implementation of the European Partnership was submitted to the European Commission as input to the Commission's SAP Report. The next STM meeting is scheduled for October 2005.

In 2008 the Commission confirmed that it would conduct a "feasibility study." A feasibility study is traditionally the first step in the Stabilisation and Association Process, the tool the EU uses to help prepare potential candidates in the Western Balkans for membership of the EU.

== See also ==
- Accession of Kosovo to the European Union
