= South Atlantic Peace and Cooperation Zone =

Organization

(in other official languages)
Spanish	Zona de Paz y Cooperación del Atlántico Sur
French	Zone de Paix et de Coopération de l'Atlantique Sud
Portuguese	Zona de Paz e Cooperação do Atlântico Sul
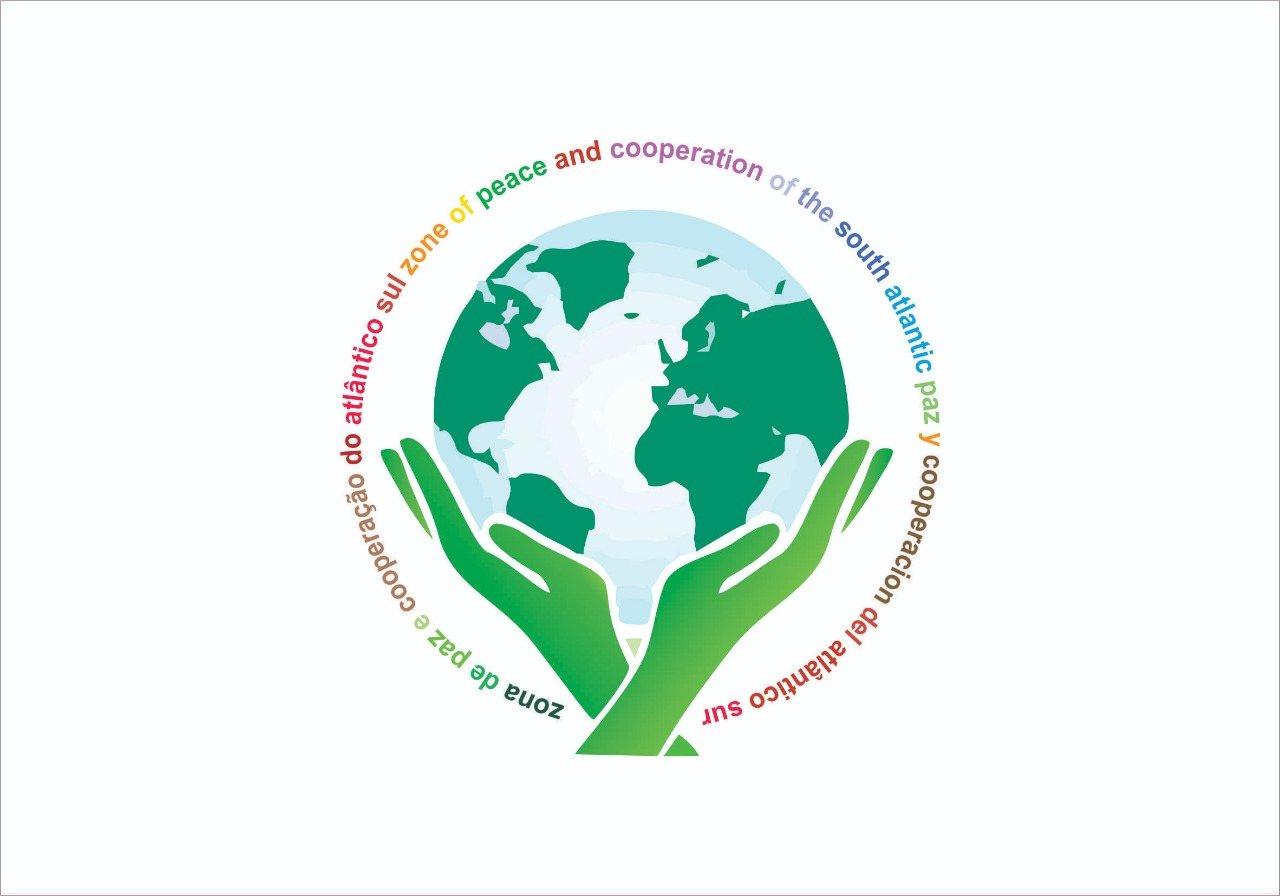
- Flag of the ZPCAS

- Member countries shown in blue
- Formation: 27 October 1986
- Headquarters: Brasília, Brazil
- Members: 24 member states
- Official language: English, Portuguese, Spanish, French
- Secretary General: H.E. Luiz Inácio Lula da Silva

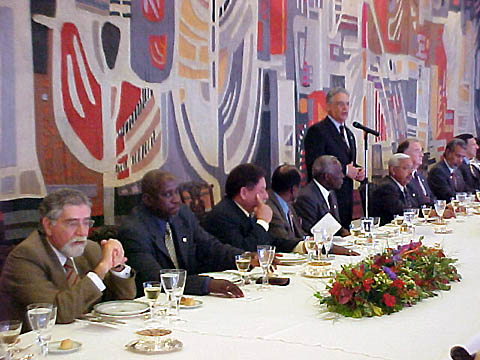
President Fernando Henrique Cardoso speaks at the ZPCAS Summit held in Brasília.

The South Atlantic Peace and Cooperation Zone (abbreviations: ZPCAS or ZOPACAS; Spanish: Zona de Paz y Cooperación del Atlántico Sur; Portuguese: Zona de Paz e Cooperação do Atlântico Sul; also called the Zone of Peace and Cooperation of the South Atlantic) was created in 1986 through resolution A/RES/41/11 of the U.N. general assembly on Brazil's initiative, with the aim of promoting cooperation and the maintenance of peace and security in the South Atlantic region. Particular attention was dedicated to the question of preventing the geographical proliferation of nuclear weapons and of reducing and eventually eliminating the military presence of countries from other regions.

A Declaration on the denuclearization of the South Atlantic region was adopted at a meeting of member states held in Brasília in September 1994. The U.N. General Assembly endorsed the initiative, albeit with opposition from the United States, United Kingdom and France.

The South Atlantic itself is currently not a nuclear-weapon-free zone but all member states are currently signatories of international treaties that prohibit nuclear weapons, namely the African Nuclear Weapons Free Zone Treaty and the Treaty for the Prohibition of Nuclear Weapons in Latin America and the Caribbean. However, several Mid-Atlantic Ridge islands, the British overseas territory of Saint Helena and its dependencies Ascension Island and Tristan da Cunha, and Norway's Bouvet Island are not covered by those treaties. However, the British Overseas Territories of the Falkland Islands and South Georgia and the South Sandwich Islands are covered by these treaties.

== Members ==
Country	Continent
Angola	Africa
Argentina	Americas
Benin	Africa
Brazil	Americas
Cameroon	Africa
Cape Verde	Africa
Congo	Africa
Democratic Republic of the Congo	Africa
Equatorial Guinea	Africa
Gabon	Africa
Gambia	Africa
Ghana	Africa
Guinea	Africa
Guinea-Bissau	Africa
Ivory Coast	Africa
Liberia	Africa
Namibia	Africa
Nigeria	Africa
São Tomé and Príncipe	Africa
Senegal	Africa
Sierra Leone	Africa
South Africa	Africa
Togo	Africa
Uruguay	Americas

== See also ==
- NATO
- Community of Portuguese Language Countries
- African Nuclear Weapons Free Zone Treaty, Treaty for the Prohibition of Nuclear Weapons in Latin America and the Caribbean
- Africa-South America Summit
