= European Federation of Psychiatric Trainees =

- Formation: 1993
- Headquarters: 20, Avenue de la Couronne 1050 Bruxelles (Ixelles), Belgium
- Members: 38 European countries
- President: Claudiu Pavel, M.D.
- Website: efpt.eu

The European Federation of Psychiatric Trainees (EFPT) is a non-profit organization for European national psychiatric trainees. It is a federation of the national trainees associations (NTA) of psychiatric trainees of about 38 European nations.

== Organization ==
The EFPT is a non-profit organization registered under Belgian law. The governing body of the EFPT is the General Assembly, which meets annually. A board of directors (Board members) is annually elected by the General Assembly. Board members work as a team to fulfil the EFPTs goals and projects, with the help of General Managers, who are elected by board members.

== Statements ==
The EFPT produces statements that form the basis of the EFPT's work and are communicated to partner organizations.

== Projects and Working Groups ==
The EFPT has a community of active working groups organizing events dedicated to the improvement of trainees' knowledge and skills (e.g., psychopathology, research methods, leadership, neuropsychopharmacology).

== Research ==
In the past, the EFPT led several research projects about :

- relationship between trainees and industry,
- burnout among psychiatry trainees,
- brain drain among psychiatry trainees,
- psychotherapy training of psychiatry trainees,

The EFPT also conceived materials promoting a positive image of psychiatry, with some videos targeting stigmatization.
