= Southeastern Europe =

Geographic region in Europe

Topographical map of Southeastern Europe

Southeastern Europe or Southeast Europe is a geographical sub-region of Europe, consisting primarily of the region of the Balkans, as well as adjacent regions and archipelagos. There are overlapping and conflicting definitions of the region, due to political, economic, historical, cultural, and geographical considerations.

Sovereign states and territories that may be included in the region are Albania, Bosnia and Herzegovina, Bulgaria, Croatia (alternatively placed in Central Europe), Greece (alternatively placed in the broader region of Southern Europe), Kosovo, Montenegro, North Macedonia, Romania (alternatively placed in Eastern Europe), Serbia, and the European part of Turkey (alternatively placed in the broader region of Southern Europe, also in Western Asia with the rest of the country). Sometimes, Cyprus (most often placed in West Asia), Hungary (most often placed in Central Europe), Moldova (most often placed in Eastern Europe), and Slovenia (most often placed in Central Europe) are also included.

The largest cities of the region are Istanbul, Athens, Bucharest, Sofia, and Belgrade.

== Definition ==
The first known use of the term "Southeast Europe" was by Austrian researcher Johann Georg von Hahn (1811–1869) as a broader term than the traditional Balkans, a concept based on the boundaries of the Balkan Peninsula. Countries described in 2004 by Istituto Geografico De Agostini as being entirely within the Balkan region, are: Albania, Bosnia and Herzegovina, Bulgaria, Montenegro, and North Macedonia.

However from the 1990s onwards, in part due to the negative historical and political connotations of the term Balkans, (especially since the military conflicts of the 1990s in Yugoslavia in the western half of the region) the term Southeast Europe is becoming increasingly popular.

=== Standing Committee on Geographical Names ===
The cultural borders of Europe according to the Standing Committee on Geographical Names, Germany. The map displays two different segment-bordering ways superimposed on each other.

The German Ständiger Ausschuss für geographische Namen (Standing Committee on Geographical Names), which develops and recommends rules for the uniform use of geographical names, proposes two sets of boundaries. The first follows international borders of current countries. The second subdivides and includes some countries based on cultural criteria. The following countries are included in their classification "Southeastern Europe":

- Albania
- Bosnia and Herzegovina
- Bulgaria
- Cyprus
- Greece
- Montenegro
- Moldova
- North Macedonia
- Romania
- Serbia

In this classification, Croatia, Hungary and Slovenia are included in Central Europe, while Turkey (East Thrace) is classified outside of Europe.

=== CIA World Factbook ===
Regions of Europe based on CIA World Factbook. Southeastern Europe in brown

In the CIA World Factbook, the description of each country includes information about "Location" under the heading "Geography", where the country is classified into a region. The following countries are included in their classification "Southeast Europe":

- Albania
- Bosnia and Herzegovina
- Bulgaria
- Croatia
- Kosovo
- Montenegro
- North Macedonia
- Romania
- Serbia
- Turkey (East Thrace)

In this classification, Moldova is included in Eastern Europe and Greece is included in Southern Europe. Hungary and Slovenia are included in Central Europe.

== Notable groupings of states ==
- The Stability Pact for South Eastern Europe (SPSEE) included Albania, Bosnia and Herzegovina, Bulgaria, Croatia, Hungary, Kosovo, Moldova, Montenegro, North Macedonia, Romania, Serbia and Slovenia as member partners.
- The South-East European Cooperation Process (SEECP) includes Albania, Bosnia and Herzegovina, Bulgaria, Croatia, Greece, Kosovo, Moldova, Montenegro, North Macedonia, Romania, Serbia, Slovenia and Turkey as member partners.
- The Southeast European Cooperative Initiative (SECI) includes Albania, Bosnia and Herzegovina, Bulgaria, Croatia, Greece, Hungary, Moldova, Montenegro, North Macedonia, Romania, Serbia, Slovenia and Turkey as member partners.
- The Southeast European Law Enforcement Center (SELEC) includes Albania, Bosnia and Herzegovina, Bulgaria, Greece, Hungary, Moldova, Montenegro, North Macedonia, Romania, Serbia and Turkey as member states.
- The EU-co-funded South East Europe Transnational Cooperation Programme includes the whole territory of Albania, Austria, Bosnia and Herzegovina, Bulgaria, Croatia, Greece, Hungary, North Macedonia, Montenegro, Moldova, Romania, Serbia, Slovakia, Slovenia, and parts of Italy and Ukraine as part of the "programme area".
- The Police Cooperation Convention for Southeast Europe (PCC SEE) includes Albania, Austria, Bosnia and Herzegovina, Bulgaria, Croatia, Hungary, Moldova, Montenegro, North Macedonia, Romania, Serbia and Slovenia as member states.
- Studies of the World Bank treat Albania, Bosnia and Herzegovina, Bulgaria, Croatia, Moldova, North Macedonia, Romania and Serbia as the eight South Eastern European countries (SEE8).
- A 2006 publication of the World Health Organization (WHO) and Council of Europe Development Bank (CEB) listed Albania, Bosnia and Herzegovina, Bulgaria, Croatia, North Macedonia, Moldova, Romania and Serbia and Montenegro as 'south-eastern European countries'.
- The World Bank does not include the EU countries in its reports, and lists only Albania, Bosnia and Herzegovina, Kosovo, Montenegro, North Macedonia, and Serbia (SEE6).
- UNHCR's Regional Office in South Eastern Europe currently lists Albania, Bosnia and Herzegovina, North Macedonia and Montenegro as part of 'South Eastern Europe'.
- The OECD's South East Europe Regional Programme includes Albania, Bosnia and Herzegovina, Kosovo, North Macedonia, Montenegro, Serbia and Turkiye among its focus economies.

== See also ==
- EuroVoc
- Organization of the Black Sea Economic Cooperation
- Percentages agreement
- Regional Cooperation Council
- Southeast European Times
- South East Europe Media Organisation
- Southeast Europe Transport Community
