= Transport Community =

- Native names: Транспортна заједница (Serbian); Transportna zajednica (Bosnian); Komuniteti i Transportit (Albanian); Транспортна заедница (Macedonian); Transportna zajednica (Montenegrin)
- Founded at: Trieste, Italy
- Type: international organisation
- Headquarters: Belgrade, Serbia
- Region served: Southeast Europe
- Members: European Union; Albania; Bosnia and Herzegovina; Montenegro; Kosovo; North Macedonia; Serbia
- Director: Mr Tālis Linkaits
- Website: www.transport-community.org

The Transport Community is an international organisation in the field of mobility and transport, consisting of 36 participants. The participants are the European Union (EU) member states (represented by the European Commission); the non-EU countries of the Western Balkans, namely Albania, Bosnia and Herzegovina, Kosovo, Montenegro, North Macedonia and Serbia; and three observing participants (Georgia, Moldova and Ukraine).

The Transport Community's stated goal is integration of Western Balkans’ transport markets into the EU, by assisting the six Western Balkans partners to adopt and implement the EU legislation in the field of transport and by supporting projects that are connecting Western Balkans regional partners among themselves and with the EU.

== Foundation ==
The South East Europe Transport Observatory (SEETO), based in Belgrade, had been collecting data on transport in the Western Balkan area since 2004, producing reports recommending courses of action.

The organisation was founded by the Treaty establishing the Transport Community signed on 12 July 2017 in Trieste and ratified by 9th of October 2017 by all partners (Council Decision (EU) 2019/392).

The aim of the Treaty is the creation of a Transport Community in the field of road, rail, inland waterway and maritime transport as well as the development of the transport network between the European Union and the six Western Balkan Parties. Its members are the European Union and the six Western Balkan parties namely Albania, Bosnia and Herzegovina, Kosovo, North Macedonia, Montenegro and Serbia.

In December 2017 Belgrade was unanimously elected as the seat of the Community's Permanent Office. The permanent office was opened in September 2019.

== Activities ==
Developing a rolling plan for the Ten-T interlinked system.

Between 2015 and 2020, the EU provided €1 billion in grants to transport and energy projects which has been added to a further €1 billion collected from other sources. 45,000 jobs have been created.

There are three observing participants, Georgia, the Republic of Moldova and Ukraine and in 2022 it was agreed that the organisation will be expanded to include these three countries as full members.

== See also ==
- Berlin Process
- Southeast Europe
- Stabilisation and Association Process
- Central European Free Trade Agreement
- Stability Pact for South Eastern Europe
- Mini-Schengen area
