= Central European Free Trade Agreement =

International trade agreement

Central European Free Trade Agreement (CEFTA)
(in other official languages)
Bosnian	Centralnoevropski sporazum o slobodnoj trgovini
Montenegrin	Centralnoevropski sporazum o slobodnoj trgovini
Croatian	Srednjoeuropski ugovor o slobodnoj trgovini
Macedonian	Централноевропски договор за слободна трговија
Romanian	Acordul Central European al Comerțului Liber
Albanian	Marrëveshja e Tregtisë së Lirë të Evropës Qendrore
Serbian	Централноевропски договор о слободној трговини
- Flag

- Map of Europe (grey) indicating the members of CEFTA (blue)
- CEFTA Secretariat: Brussels
- Working language: English
- Official languages of contracting states: 7 languages: Albanian; Bosnian; Croatian; Macedonian; Montenegrin; Romanian; Serbian
- Type: Trade agreement
- Membership: Albania; Bosnia and Herzegovina; Kosovo; Moldova; Montenegro; North Macedonia; Serbia

Leaders
  - Chair-in-office 2026: Albania
  - Director of the CEFTA Secretariat: Danijela Gačević (acting)

Establishment
  - Agreement signed: 21 December 1992
  - CEFTA 2006 Agreement signed: 19 December 2006

Area
  - Total: 252,428 km^{2} (97,463 sq mi)

Population
  - 2026 estimate: 19,565,772 (68th)
  - Density: 77.5/km^{2} (200.7/sq mi)
- GDP (PPP): 2026 estimate
  - Total: ▲$544.37 billion (55th)
  - Per capita: ▲$27,822
- GDP (nominal): 2026 estimate
  - Total: ▲$249.90 billion (54th)
  - Per capita: ▲$12,772
- Currency: 6 currencies: (Albania) ALL Lek; (Bosnia and Herzegovina) BAM Convertible mark; (Kosovo) EUR Euro; (Moldova) MDL Leu; (Montenegro) EUR Euro; (North Macedonia) MKD Denar; (Serbia) RSD Dinar
- Time zone: UTC+1, UTC+2
  - Summer (DST): UTC+2, UTC+3
- Website https://cefta.int/

The Central European Free Trade Agreement (CEFTA) is an international trade agreement between countries mostly located in Southeastern Europe. Founded by representatives of Poland, Hungary and Czechoslovakia, CEFTA over time expanded to Albania, Bosnia and Herzegovina, Bulgaria, Croatia, Moldova, Montenegro, North Macedonia, Romania, Serbia, Slovenia and Kosovo.

== Members ==
As of 2024, the parties to the CEFTA agreement are: Albania, Bosnia and Herzegovina, Kosovo, Moldova, Montenegro, North Macedonia and Serbia.

Former parties are Bulgaria, Croatia, the Czech Republic, Hungary, Poland, Romania, Slovakia, and Slovenia. Their CEFTA memberships ended when they became member states of the European Union (EU). Kosovo was originally represented by UNMIK, but began representing itself from October 2024 onwards.

Parties of agreement	Joined	Left	Joined EU
Poland	21 December 1992 (signed); 1 March 1993 (entry into force)	30 April 2004	1 May 2004
Hungary	21 December 1992 (signed); 1 March 1993 (entry into force)	30 April 2004	1 May 2004
Czech Republic (Note: Until 1 January 1993 part of Czechoslovakia.)	21 December 1992 (signed); 1 March 1993 (entry into force)	30 April 2004	1 May 2004
Slovakia	21 December 1992 (signed); 1 March 1993 (entry into force)	30 April 2004	1 May 2004
Slovenia	1 January 1996	30 April 2004	1 May 2004
Romania	1 July 1997	31 December 2006	1 January 2007
Bulgaria	1 January 1999	31 December 2006	1 January 2007
Croatia	1 March 2003	30 June 2013	1 July 2013
North Macedonia (Note: Until 2019 named Republic of Macedonia.)	1 January 2006	—	—
Albania	1 May 2007	—	—
Bosnia and Herzegovina	1 May 2007	—	—
Kosovo (Note: Under the United Nations Interim Administration Mission in Kosovo until October 2024.)	1 May 2007	—	—
Moldova	1 May 2007	—	—
Montenegro	1 May 2007	—	—
Serbia	1 May 2007	—	—

== Membership criteria ==
Former Poznań Declaration criteria:

- World Trade Organization membership
- European Union Association Agreement with provisions for future full membership
- Free Trade Agreements with the current CEFTA member states

Current criteria since Zagreb meeting in 2005:

- WTO membership or commitment to respect all WTO regulations
- any European Union Association Agreement
- Free Trade Agreements with the current CEFTA member states

== Current members ==
Contracting party	Accession	Population	Area (km²)	Capital	GDP in billions (PPP)	GDP per capita (PPP)
Albania	1 May 2007	2,761,785	28,748	Tirana	55.049	18,037
Bosnia and Herzegovina	1 May 2007	3,345,818	51,209	Sarajevo	77.076	18,409
Kosovo	1 May 2007	1,586,659	10,887	Pristina	27.966	14,294
Moldova	1 May 2007	2,423,300	33,843	Chișinău	43.227	15,606
Montenegro	1 May 2007	604,966	13,812	Podgorica	18.999	27,037
North Macedonia	1 Jan 2006	1,836,713	25,713	Skopje	47.108	23,173
Serbia	1 May 2007	6,623,183	77,474	Belgrade	222.040	34,493

== History ==
History of CEFTA members from 1992 to 2013. All of the original members of the trade pact became members of the European Union (EU), and because of such, Southeast European nations, such as Albania, Bosnia and Herzegovina, Kosovo, Montenegro, and Serbia, joined in and carried the CEFTA. CEFTA member states EU member states

=== Original agreement ===
The original CEFTA agreement was signed by the Visegrád Group countries, that is by Poland, Hungary, the Czech Republic and Slovakia (at the time parts of the Czechoslovakia) on 21 December 1992 in Kraków, Poland. It came into force in July 1994. Through CEFTA, participating countries hoped to mobilize efforts to integrate into Western European institutions and through this, to join European political, economic, security and legal systems, thereby consolidating democracy and free-market economics.

The agreement was amended by the agreements signed on 11 September 1995 in Brno and on 4 July 2003 in Bled.

Slovenia joined CEFTA in 1996, Romania in 1997, Bulgaria in 1999, Croatia in 2003 and Macedonia in 2006.

=== 2006 agreement ===
All of the parties of the original agreement had now joined the EU and thus left CEFTA. Therefore, it was decided to extend CEFTA to cover the rest of the Western Balkans, which already had completed a matrix of bilateral free trade agreements in the framework of the Stability Pact for South Eastern Europe. On 6 April 2006, at the South East Europe Prime Ministers Summit in Bucharest, a joint declaration on expansion of CEFTA to Albania, Bosnia and Herzegovina, Moldova, Serbia, Montenegro and UNMIK (on behalf of Kosovo) was adopted. Kosovo is directly represented in CEFTA since October 2024. Accession of Ukraine has also been discussed. The new enlarged agreement was initialled on 9 November 2006 in Brussels and was signed on 19 December 2006 at the South East European Prime Ministers Summit in Bucharest. The agreement came into effect on 26 July 2007 for Albania, Kosovo, Moldova, Montenegro and Macedonia, on 22 August for Croatia, on 24 October for Serbia, and on 22 November 2007 for Bosnia and Herzegovina. The aim of the agreement was to establish a free trade zone in the region by 31 December 2010.

CEFTA 2006 aims at expanding regional trade in goods and services, creating an attractive environment for investment, and contributing to economic development and cooperation within the Parties. Laying down on the principles of WTO rules and procedures and harmonising its policies with the EU legislation, CEFTA provides an effective instrument for the Parties to accelerate their European integration agenda. Since the establishing, CEFTA has been deepening the areas of cooperation based on the needs of the businesses and strengthening trading relations between the Parties. From achieving the full liberalisation of trade in goods and further liberalisation in trade in services, via reducing trade related costs, harmonising the policies within the Parties based on the EU legislation, to expediting trade between Parties through electronic exchange of information, CEFTA has proven as a framework that ensures transparent trade relations between the Parties that can enable the businesses to improve their capacities for different markets.

== Chair-in-office ==
The Chair-in-office rotates between member states:

- 2007 : North Macedonia
- 2008 : Moldova
- 2009 : Montenegro
- 2010 : Serbia
- 2011 : (United Nations) UNMIK on behalf of Kosovo
- 2012 : Albania
- 2013 : Bosnia and Herzegovina
- 2014 : North Macedonia
- 2015 : Moldova
- 2016 : Montenegro
- 2017 : Serbia
- 2018 : (United Nations) UNMIK on behalf of Kosovo
- 2019 : Albania
- 2020 : Bosnia and Herzegovina
- 2021 : North Macedonia
- 2022 : Moldova
- 2023 : Montenegro
- 2024 : Serbia
- 2025 : Kosovo
- 2026 : Albania

== Relations with the European Union ==
All former participating countries had previously signed association agreements with the EU, so in fact CEFTA has served as a preparation for full European Union membership. Poland, the Czech Republic, Hungary, Slovakia, Slovenia joined the EU on 1 May 2004, with Bulgaria and Romania following suit on 1 January 2007. Croatia joined the EU on 1 July 2013.

Montenegro, Serbia, Albania, North Macedonia and Moldova have been undergoing EU accession talks since 2012, 2014, 2022 and 2024.

== See also ==
- Accession of Albania to the European Union
- Accession of Bosnia and Herzegovina to the European Union
- Accession of Kosovo to the European Union
- Accession of Moldova to the European Union
- Accession of Montenegro to the European Union
- Accession of North Macedonia to the European Union
- Accession of Serbia to the European Union
- Economy of Europe
- Free trade areas in Europe
- European Free Trade Association (EFTA)
- Stability Pact for South Eastern Europe (includes an array of bilateral FTAs)
- South-East European Cooperation Process
- Southeast Europe Transport Community
- Rules of origin
- Market access
- Free-trade area
- Tariffs
