= South-East European Cooperation Process =

Regional organisation of Western Balkans states

- Logo

- Members
- Headquarters: Sofia, Bulgaria (SEECP PA)
- Type: Intergovernmental organization
- Membership: Albania; Bosnia and Herzegovina; Bulgaria; Greece; North Macedonia; Romania; Serbia; Turkey; Croatia; Moldova; Montenegro; Slovenia; Kosovo

Leaders
  - Chairmanship-in-Office: Romania

Establishment
  - SEECP Established: 1996
  - Parliamentary Assembly established: 2014

Area
  - Total: 1,594,454 km^{2} (615,622 sq mi) (18th)

Population
  - 2026 estimate: ▲148,794,132
  - Density: 93.3/km^{2} (241.6/sq mi)
- GDP (PPP): 2026 estimate
  - Total: ▲$6.63 trillion
  - Per capita: ▲$44,573
- GDP (nominal): 2026 estimate
  - Total: ▲$3.19 trillion
  - Per capita: ▲$21,450
- Website https://www.seecp.info/ https://rspcsee.org/

The South-East European Cooperation Process (SEECP) was launched on Bulgaria's initiative in 1996. At the Bulgaria-chaired meeting in Sofia, the Southeast Europe (SEE) countries laid the foundations for regional co-operation for the purposes of creating an atmosphere of trust, good neighbourly relations and stability.

A special characteristic of SEECP is that it is an original form of co-operation among the countries in the region launched on their own initiative, and not on the initiative of some other international organisation or countries. In that regard, the SEECP seeks to define itself as an authentic voice of SEE, complementary to the Stability Pact, Southeast European Cooperative Initiative or the Stabilisation and Association Process.

The basic goals of regional co-operation within SEECP include the strengthening of security and the political situation, intensification of economic relations and co-operation in the areas of human resources, democracy, justice, and battle against illegal activities. It is the intention of the SEECP to enable its members to approach the European and Euro-Atlantic structures through the strengthening of good neighbourly relations and transformation of the region into an area of peace and stability.

== Membership ==
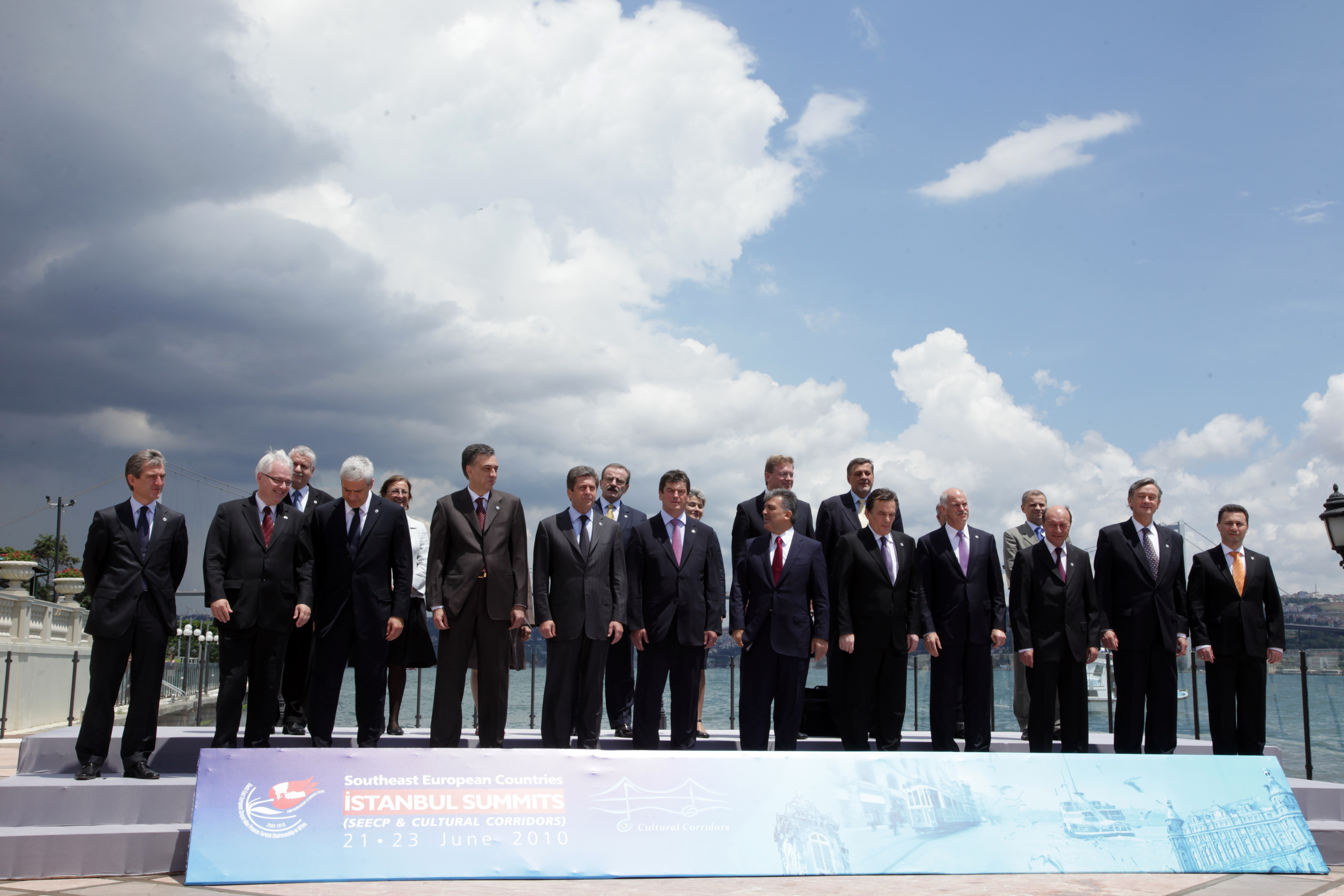
Southeast European leaders pose for a family photo during the SEECP Summit in Istanbul, Turkey

- Founding members:
  - Albania
  - Bosnia and Herzegovina
  - Bulgaria
  - Greece
  - North Macedonia
  - Romania
  - Serbia (joined as Serbia and Montenegro)
  - Turkey
- Joined later:
  - Croatia (2005)
  - Moldova (2006)
  - Montenegro (2007)
  - Slovenia (2010)
  - Kosovo (2014)

== Structure ==
The SEECP is a regional non-institutionalised process co-ordinated by the presiding country. The SEECP presidency lasts for one year and is rotated among the members. The presiding country presents the Process at international meetings and hosts the annual meeting of heads of state and government, foreign ministers meeting and a number of annual meetings of political directors. Depending on the situation, the presiding country may call extraordinary meetings. Representatives of the current, past, and future SEECP Chair-in-Office form a Troika to ensure the continuity of activities.

=== Regional Cooperation Council ===
The Regional Cooperation Council (RCC) was established at a 2008 meeting of foreign affairs ministers from the SEECP. The RCC consists of 46 participants made up of the SEECP countries, along with other countries and supranational organizations who are interested in the stability and development of the region.

=== Parliamentary Assembly ===
The SEECP Parliamentary Assembly was established in 2014 to bring together representatives from the legislatures of member states. It meets in plenary session once a year, chaired by the speaker of the legislature of the country holding the SEECP Chairmanship-in-Office. The work of the assembly is supported by the Regional Secretariat for Parliamentary Cooperation in South East Europe, based in Sofia, Bulgaria.

== Chairmanship ==
Presiding country is changed each year on 1 July:

- 1996–97, Bulgaria
- 1997–98, Greece
- 1998–99, Turkey
- 1999–2000, Romania
- 2000–01, North Macedonia
- 2001–02, Albania
- 2002–03, Serbia and Montenegro
- 2003–04, Bosnia and Herzegovina
- April 2004 – May 2005, Romania
- May 2005 – May 2006, Greece
- May 2006 – May 2007, Croatia
- May 2007 – May 2008, Bulgaria
- 2008–09, Moldova
- 2009–10, Turkey
- 2010–11, Montenegro
- 2011–12, Serbia
- 2012–13, North Macedonia
- 2013–14, Romania
- 2014–15, Albania
- 2015–16, Bulgaria
- 2016–17, Croatia
- 2017–18, Slovenia
- 2018–19, Bosnia and Herzegovina
- 2019–20, Kosovo
- 2020–21, Turkey
- 2021–22, Greece
- 2022–23, Montenegro
- 2023–24, North Macedonia
- 2024–25, Albania
- 2025–26, Bulgaria
- 2026–27, Romania

== Meetings held ==
Heads of state and government meetings

- 2–4 November 1997, Crete
- 12–13 October 1998, Antalya
- 12 February 2000, Bucharest
- 25 October 2000, Skopje (extraordinary meeting)
- 23 February 2001, Skopje
- 28 March 2002, Tirana
- 9 April 2003, Belgrade
- 21 April 2004, Sarajevo
- 11 May 2005, Bucharest
- 4 May 2006, Thessaloniki
- 11 May 2007, Zagreb
- 21 May 2008, Pomorie
- 5 June 2009, Chișinău
- 21–23 June 2010, Istanbul
- 1 June 2013, Ohrid (cancelled)
- 25 June 2014, Bucharest
- 26 May 2015, Tirana
- 1 June 2016, Sofia
- 30 June 2017, Dubrovnik
- 24 April 2018, Kranj
- 8–9 July 2019, Sarajevo (Refused by Kosovo)
- 2020, Pristina (Cancelled due to COVID-19)
- 17–18 June 2021, Antalya
- 10–11 June 2022, Athens
- 27 June 2023, Podgorica
- 13 June 2024, Skopje
- 16 June 2025, Tirana
- 10 June 2026, Sofia

Foreign ministers meetings

- 6–7 July 1996, Sofia
- 5–6 June 1997, Thessaloniki
- 8–9 June 1998, Istanbul
- 19 March 1999, Bucharest
- 2 December 1999, Bucharest
- 14 July 2000, Ohrid
- 16 May 2001, Tirana
- 19 June 2002, Belgrade
- 9 June 2003, Sarajevo
- 22 October 2004, Bucharest
- 24 January 2006, Athens
- 1 March 2007, Zagreb
- 14 June 2012, Belgrade
- 22 May 2015, Tirana
- 23 April 2018, Kranj
- 5 September 2018, Banja Luka
- 25 June 2020, Pristina (Online due to COVID-19)
- 6 November 2020, Antalya
- 5 June 2023, Budva
- 13 June 2024, Skopje
- 10 June 2026, Sofia

== Relations with Third States and International Reception ==
In its "2006-2007 Enlargement Strategy and Main Challenges", the European Commission stated its "strong" support for the SEECP alongside initiatives such as the Energy Community and European Common Aviation Area. The Commission stated that "the future of Western Balkans lies within the EU" but considered that the SEECP was a welcomed example of countries taking "ownership of the process of regional cooperation."

== See also ==
- Southeast Europe
- Stability Pact for South Eastern Europe
- Southeast European Cooperative Initiative (SECI)
- Organization of the Black Sea Economic Cooperation (BSEC)
- Central European Initiative
