= Ulrich Pfeil =

German historian (born 1966)

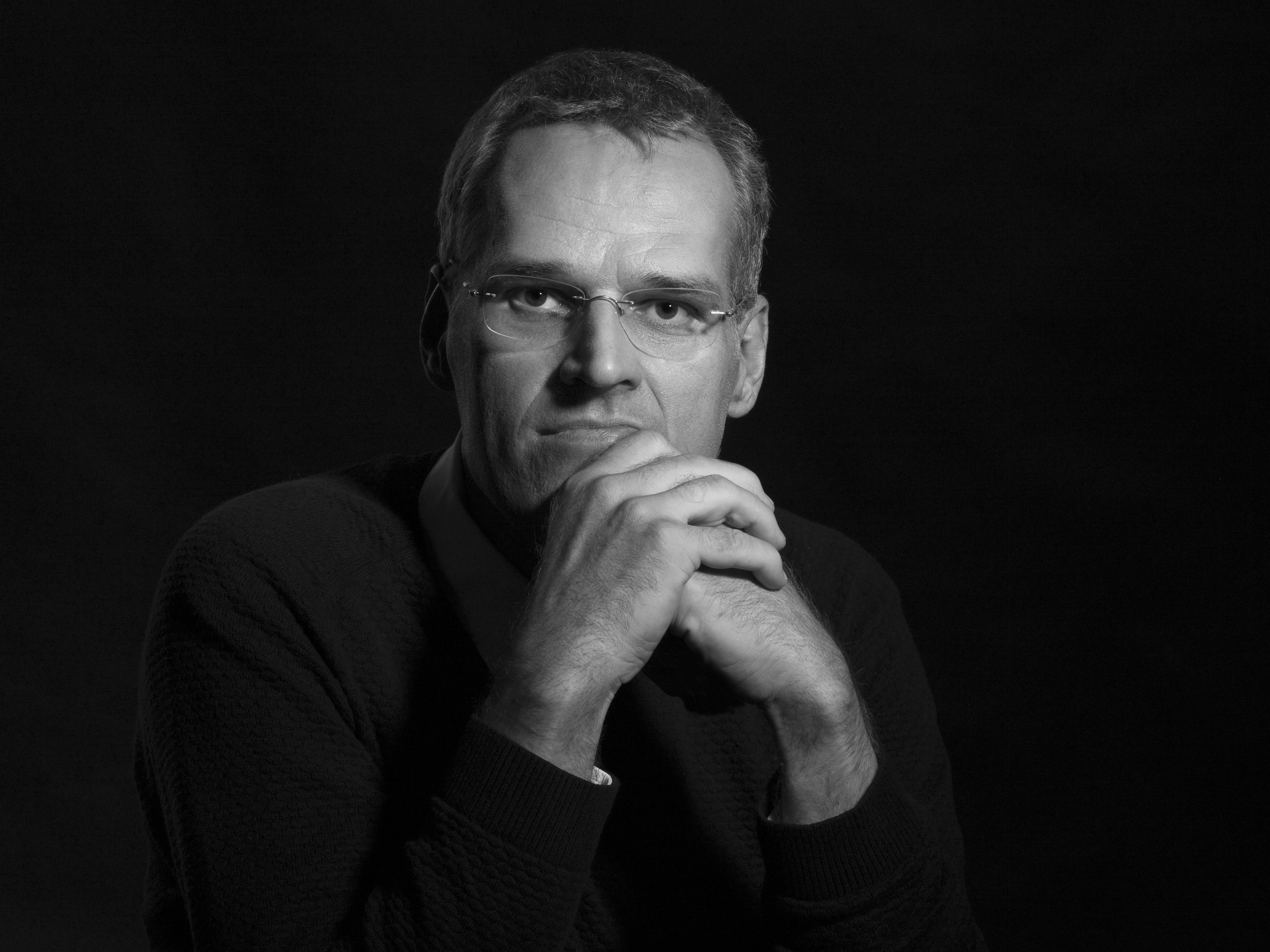
Ulrich Pfeil

Ulrich Pfeil (born 13 May 1966) is a German historian based in France.

== Life ==
Born in Hamburg Pfeil grew up in Heide (Holstein) and took the Abitur at the Gymnasium Heide-Ost in 1985. After his military service he studied Educational Science, French language and history at the University of Hamburg from 1987 to 1993. In 1989/90 he worked as Foreign Language Assistant in Lure in France. Between 1993 and 1995 he completed his legal clerkship at the Elsensee-Gymnasium in Quickborn. After the second Staatsexamen he taught at the grammar school Bernau bei Berlin in 1995/96.

In 1995 he was appointed to the Department of History at the University of Hamburg with a dissertation on Vom Kaiserreich ins Dritte Reich. Die Kreisstadt Heide/Holstein 1890–1933. From 1996 to 2002, Pfeil was a German Academic Exchange Service-Lektor at the Institut d'Allemand of Asnières-sur-Seine) of the University of Sorbonne Nouvelle Paris 3. A scholarship from the Deutsche Forschungsgemeinschaft enabled him to study at the Charles de Gaulle University – Lille III in 2002 on the topic Die anderen deutsch-französischen Beziehungen. The DDR and France 1949-1990 led him to habilitation. Between 2002 and 2009 he worked at the German Historical Institute Paris and in 2003 he took a visiting professorship at the 1st Franco-German cycle of the Sciences Po Paris in Nancy. Pfeil was Professor of German Studies at the Jean Monnet University in Saint-Étienne from 2005 to 2010. On September 1, 2010, he received a call to the University of Metz, which was merged with the University of Lorraine in 2012.

His main research interests in the field of modern and contemporary history are, besides studies on German and French Culture of Remembrance, the France-Germany relations in History and topicality the history of Europe, Germany in Cold War, the history of German and international historiography and the Schleswig-Holstein Landesgeschichte in the 19th and 20th century. He has also co-edited the German-French History Book Histoire/Geschichte He is also interested in the history of football, especially for those of FC Bayern München. He also writes in the press on current issues of Franco-German relations and the political development in France. Until its dissolution he was a member of the Historische Kommission beim SPD-Parteivorstand.

== Publications ==
Monographs

- Vom Kaiserreich ins "Dritte Reich". Heide 1890–1933. Eigenverlag, Heide 1997 (Zugl. Dissertation, Universität Hamburg, 1996).
- Von der roten Revolution zur braunen Diktatur. Heide zwischen 1918 und 1935. Quellen, Texte und Abbildungen für die Sekundarstufe I. Herausgegeben von der GEW Heide, Heide 1997.
- « Comme un coup de tonnerre dans un ciel d’été ». Französische Reaktionen auf den 17. Juni 1953. Verlauf – Perzeptionen – Interpretationen (Kleine Schriftenreihe der Historischen Kommission zu Berlin. Heft 8). Berliner Wissenschaftsverlag, Berlin 2003, ISBN 3-8305-0493-4.
- Die "anderen" deutsch-französischen Beziehungen. Die DDR und Frankreich 1949–1990 (Zeithistorische Studien des Zentrums für Zeithistorische Forschung Potsdam, 26). Böhlau, Cologne 2004, ISBN 3-412-04403-2.
- Das Deutsche Historische Institut Paris und seine Gründungsväter. Ein personengeschichtlicher Ansatz. Munich 2007, ISBN 978-3-486-58519-3.
- Vorgeschichte und Gründung des Deutschen Historischen Instituts Paris. Darstellung und Dokumentation. Thorbecke, Ostfildern 2007, ISBN 978-3-7995-7917-9.
- with Corine Defrance: Eine Nachkriegsgeschichte in Europa 1945–1963. Deutsch-Französische Geschichte, 10. Wissenschaftliche Buchgesellschaft, Darmstadt 2011, ISBN 978-3-534-14708-3.
  - Entre guerre froide et intégration européenne. Reconstruction et rapprochement 1945–1963 Histoire franco-Allemande, 10. Septentrion, Villeneuve d’Ascq 2012, ISBN 978-2-7574-0344-0.
- with Corine Defrance: 50 Jahre Deutsch-Französisches Jugendwerk / L’Office franco-allemand pour la jeunesse a 50 ans, ed. DFJW, Berlin, Paris 2013, ISBN 978-2-36924-000-6.

Publisher

- La RDA et l’Occident 1949–1990. PIA, Asnières 2000, ISBN 2-910212-15-7.
- Die DDR und der Westen. Transnationale Beziehungen 1949–1989. Ch. Links, Berlin 2001, ISBN 3-86153-244-1.
- with Corine Defrance: Der Élysée-Vertrag und die deutsch-französischen Beziehungen 1945–1963–2003. Oldenbourg, Munich 2005, ISBN 3-486-57678-X (Digitalisat; auch auf französisch erschienen).
- Deutsch-französische Kultur- und Wissenschaftsbeziehungen im 20. Jahrhundert. Ein institutionengeschichtlicher Ansatz. Oldenbourg, Munich 2007, ISBN 978-3-486-58180-5 (Digitalisat).
- Das Deutsche Historische Institut Paris und seine Gründungsväter. Ein personengeschichtlicher Ansatz. Oldenbourg, Munich 2007, ISBN 978-3-486-58519-3 (Digitalisat).
- Die Rückkehr der deutschen Geschichtswissenschaft in die ›Ökumene der Historiker‹. Ein wissenschaftsgeschichtlicher Ansatz. Oldenbourg, Munich 2008, ISBN 978-3-486-58795-1 (Digitalisat).
- with Hans Manfred Bock, Corine Defrance, Gilbert Krebs: Les jeunes dans les relations transnationales. L’Office franco-allemand pour la jeunesse 1963–2008. PSN, Paris 2008, ISBN 978-2-87854-427-5.
- with Jean-Paul Cahn: Allemagne 1945–1961. De la « catastrophe » à la construction du Mur. Septentrion, Villeneuve d’Ascq 2008, ISBN 978-2-7574-0056-2.
- with Jean-Paul Cahn: Allemagne 1961–1974. De la construction du Mur à l’Ostpolitik. Septentrion, Villeneuve d’Ascq 2009, ISBN 978-2-7574-0107-1.
- with Jean-Paul Cahn: Allemagne 1974–1990. De l’Ostpolitik à l’unification. Septentrion, Villeneuve d’Ascq 2009, ISBN 978-2-7574-0114-9.
- Football et identité en France et en Allemagne. Septentrion, Villeneuve d’Ascq 2010, ISBN 978-2-7574-0156-9.
- Mythes et tabous des relations franco-allemandes au XXe siècle / Mythen und Tabus der deutsch-französischen Beziehungen im 20. Jahrhundert. Peter Lang, Bern 2012, ISBN 978-3-0343-0592-1.
- with Corine Defrance: La construction d'un espace scientifique commun? La France, la RFA et l'Europe après le « choc du Spoutnik ». Peter Lang, Bern 2012, ISBN 978-90-5201-857-7.
- with Corine Defrance: La France, l’Allemagne et le traité de l’Élysée, 1963–2013. CNRS Éditions, Paris 2012, ISBN 978-2-271-07488-1.
- with Françoise Lartillot: Constructions de l'espace dans les cultures d'expression allemande. Peter Lang, Bern 2013, ISBN 978-3-0343-0600-3.
- with Nicole Colin, Corine Defrance, Joachim Umlauf: Lexikon der deutsch-französischen Kulturbeziehungen nach 1945. Narr, Tübingen 2013 (2nd edition 2015), ISBN 978-3-8233-6693-5.
- with Anne Kwaschik: Die DDR in den deutsch-französischen Beziehungen. Peter Lang, Bern 2013, ISBN 978-2-87574-074-8.
- with Corine Defrance und Andreas Wilkens: Willy Brandt. Un projet pour l'Allemagne (1913–1992) (Schriftenreihe der Bundeskanzler-Willy-Brandt-Stiftung, vol. 28). Bundeskanzler-Willy-Brandt-Stiftung, Berlin 2014, ISBN 978-3-933090-27-0.
- with Christin Niemeyer: Der deutsche Film im Kalten Krieg = Cinéma allemand et guerre froide. Peter Lang, Bern 2014, ISBN 978-2-87574-180-6.
- with Dietmar Hüser: Populärkultur und deutsch-französische Mittler / Culture de masse et médiateurs franco-allemands. Akteure, Medien, Ausdrucksformen / Acteurs, médias, articulations (Jahrbuch des Frankreich-Zentrums Saarbrücken, 14/2014). Transcript, Bielefeld 2015, ISBN 978-3-8376-3082-4.
- with Corine Defrance (ed.): Verständigung und Versöhnung nach dem „Zivilisationsbruch“? Deutschland in Europa nach 1945. Peter Lang, Bern 2016 [Schriftenreihe der Bundeszentrale für politische Bildung, vol. 1731, Bonn 2016], ISBN 978-2-87574-334-3.
- with Nicole Colin, Corine Defrance, Joachim Umlauf (ed.): Le Mur de Berlin. Histoire, mémoires, représentations. Peter Lang, Bern 2016, ISBN 978-2-8076-0143-7.
- with Franziska Flucke, Bärbel Kuhn (ed.): Der Kalte Krieg im Schulbuch. Röhrig, St. Ingbert 2017, ISBN 978-3-86110-630-2.
- with Corine Defrance, Bettina Greiner (ed.): Die Berliner Luftbrücke. Memory space des Kalten Krieges. Ch. Links Verlag, Berlin 2018, ISBN 978-3-86153-991-9.
