= Treaty of Aix-la-Chapelle =

There were three Treaties of Aix-la-Chapelle. Although "Aix-la-Chapelle", the French name of the German city of Aachen, is an exonym now rarely used in English, the name Treaty of Aachen is rarely used.

- Pax Nicephori, also sometimes called Treaty of Aix-la-Chapelle of 812, Byzantine recognition of the Carolingian empire
- Treaty of Aix-la-Chapelle (1668), ending the War of Devolution
- Treaty of Aix-la-Chapelle (1748), ending the War of the Austrian Succession
- Treaty of Aachen (2019) (a.k.a. Aachen Treaty), successor to the Élysée Treaty of 1963 between Germany and France

== See also ==
- Congress of Aix-la-Chapelle (disambiguation)
