= Franco-German Day =

- Franco-German flag
- Official name: de: Deutsch-Französischer Tag fr: Journée franco-allemande
- Observed by: France, Germany
- Type: National, cultural
- Celebrations: Workshops, projects, student exchanges, language promotions, baking (normally traditional food from the other country)
- Date: 22 January
- Frequency: Annual
- First time: 2003
- Started by: France and Germany

The Franco-German Day (German: Deutsch-Französischer Tag (DFT); French: Journée franco-allemande (JFA)) is an annual holiday celebrated in Germany and France. It is mainly celebrated in institutions such as schools and even results in events such as student exchanges, where French and German students take part in different activities.

== History ==
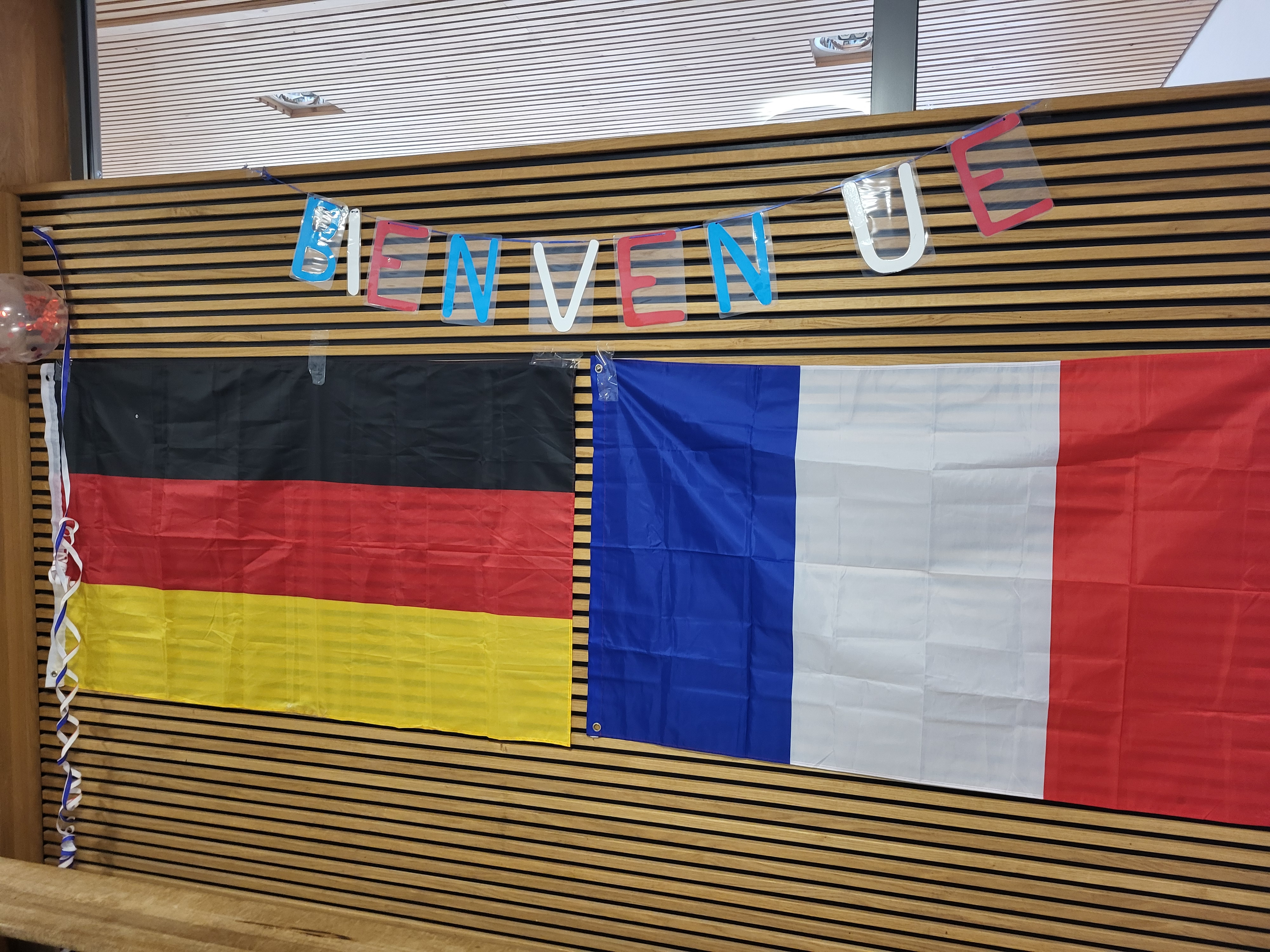
Decorations in a German school

French president Jacques Chirac and German chancellor Gerhard Schröder introduced the Franco-German Day on the 40th anniversary of the signing of the Élysée Treaty in 1963. Article 16 of the joint declaration of both governments of 22 January 2003 states:

"We declare January 22nd as the 'Franco-German Day' We hope that in the future this day will be dedicated in all institutions of our educational systems to presenting our bilateral relations, promoting the partner language and providing information about exchange and meeting programs as well as about study and employment opportunities in the partner country."

Since its foundation in 2003, it has a different motto every year, such as "Rediscovering France – Germany, a country to rediscover" (Frankreich neu entdecken – l’Allemagne, un pays à redécouvri) in the language of the other country in 2007/08.

The foreign ministries in both countries, the ministries of Culture and Education in both countries are the main contributors to the implementation of the Franco-German Day. But the commitment of schools and private initiatives are as much important as the ministries.

German chancellor Angela Merkel and French president Emmanuel Macron signed the Aachen Treaty on the Franco-German day in 2019, which consisted of various steps in promoting Franco-German relations.
