= Hélène Miard-Delacroix =

French historian and Germanist

Prof. Dr. Hélène Miard-Delacroix
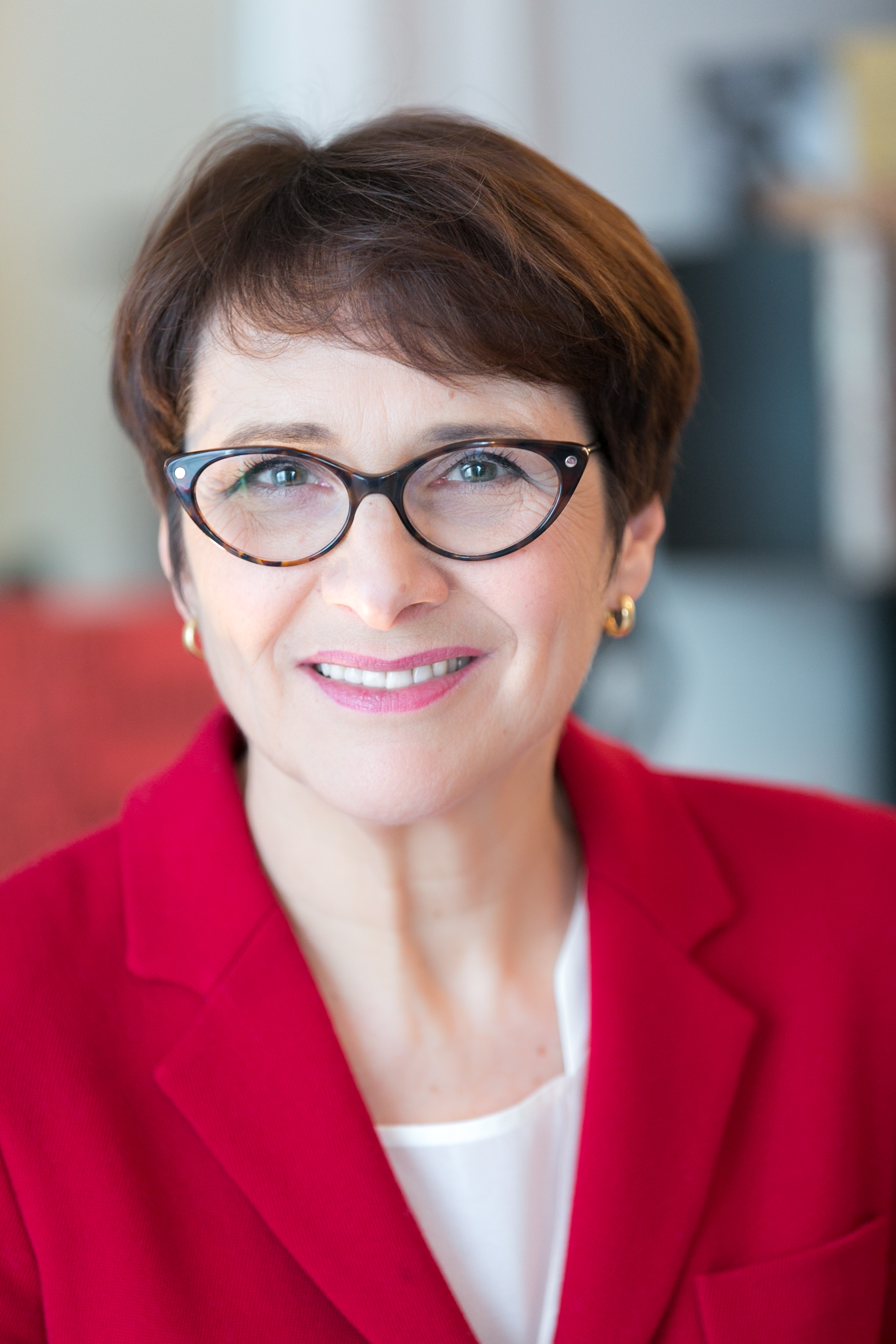
- Born: November 5, 1959 (age 66); Saint-Mandé, France
- Occupations: Historian; Germanist; professor
- Known for: Commitment to scholarly exchange between France and Germany
- Awards: Reimar Lüst Prize

Academic background
- Education: Paris-Sorbonne University
- Thesis: Le chancelier Helmut Schmidt et la France : 1974-1982 (1989)
- Doctoral advisor: Gérard Schneilin

Academic work
- Discipline: Franco-German relations
- Sub-discipline: history of Germany since 1945; political, economic and social life in contemporary Germany; Franco-German relations and European integration
- Institutions: Sorbonne University

Hélène Miard-Delacroix (born 5 November 1959) is a French historian and Germanist, specializing in the history of Germany and Franco-German relations. She is a professor at Sorbonne University. Her expertise in research on Franco-German relations and her commitment to scholarly exchange between the two countries found international recognition in 2022 with the Reimar Lüst Prize of the Alexander von Humboldt Foundation for leading international scholars.

== Early life and education ==
Hélène Miard-Delacroix was born in Saint-Mandé, 5 November 1959.

She graduated from the Ecole Normale Supérieure in Fontenay-aux-Roses (1980–85). She holds an agrégation in German; a Master of Advanced Studies in International relations from Sciences Po in Paris; and a doctorate and a habilitation to direct research from Paris-Sorbonne University.

== Career and research ==
During the period of 1990–93, Mirard-Delacroix served as a docent at the University of Tours (1990–93), while also teaching at Sciences Po. She served as a docent at Paris-Sorbonne University in 1993-98 and as a professor at École normale supérieure de Lyon between 2003 and 2008.

Since then, she has held the position of Professor of History and Civilization of Contemporary Germany at the UFR of Germanic and Nordic Studies of Sorbonne University. She is attached to the UMR SIRICE 8138, (Note: UMR: Unité mixte de recherche) (Note: SIRICE: Sorbonne, Identités, Relations Internationales et Civilisations de l'Europe (Sorbonne, Identities, International Relations and Civilizations of Europe)) a research laboratory on the history of international relations, and is president of the GIP CIERA. (Note: GIP: Groupement d'intérêt public (public interest group)) (Note: CIERA: Centre interdisciplinaire d'études et de recherches sur l'Allemagne (Interdisciplinary Center for Studies and Research on Germany))

Her fields of research include the history of Germany since 1945; political, economic and social life in contemporary Germany; as well as Franco-German relations and European integration. In this capacity, she participates as an expert and is a consultant for the media (such as Arte, Radio France, France 5, and France 24).

Her work on Franco-German relations is marked by the desire to go beyond comparatism to write a mixed history that accounts for the entanglements and interactions between the two countries. She thus continues the cross-history approach adopted in her volume on the history of Franco-German relations since the Élysée Treaty, published in 2011, Le défi européen. Histoire franco-allemande de 1963 à nos jours. Some of her works, carried out in the context of collective opening of public archives, reassess dynamics in the last decades of the Cold War and reconsider achievements concerning bilateral negotiations and Germany's role in European construction. Her current research focuses on the history of emotions in international relations.

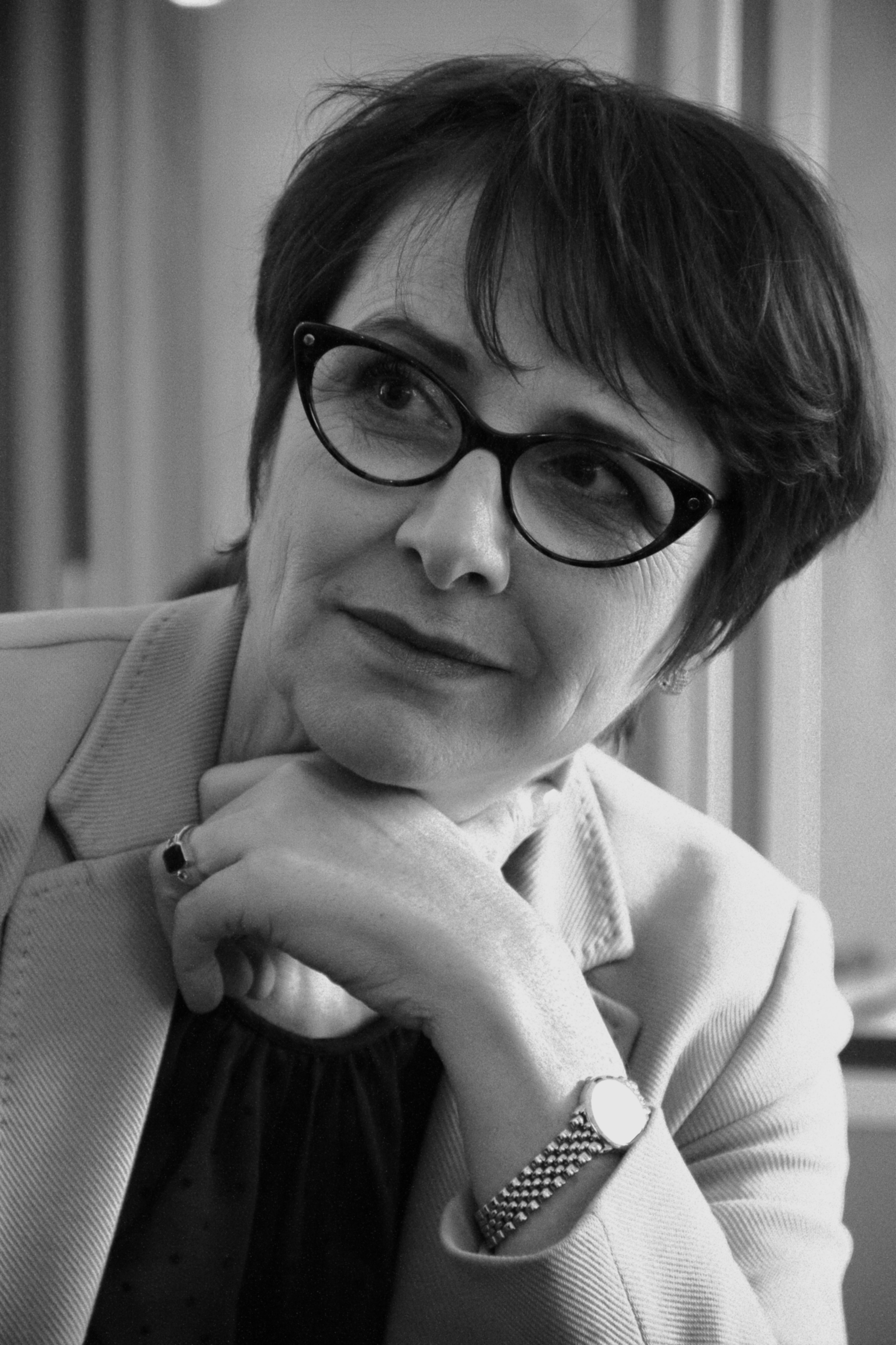
(2013)

Miard-Delacroix is a member of numerous scientific boards of German and French research institutions. In the 2010s, she was a member of the Scientific Advisory Board of the German Historical Institute Paris, and later as President of the Scientific Advisory Board of the Bundeskanzler-Willy-Brandt-Stiftung, and Vice President of the Scientific Advisory Board of the Institute of Contemporary History based in Munich and Berlin. She is currently a member of the scientific advisory board of the Haus der Geschichte in Bonn, the House of European History in Brussels, the François Mitterrand Institute, IFRA-SHS (Note: IFRA-SHS: Institut franco-allemand de sciences historiques et sociales (Franco-German Institute for Historical and Social Sciences)) in Frankfurt, and the Centre Ernst Robert Curtius (CERC) at the University of Bonn. She is a member of the Commission pour la publication des documents diplomatiques français (Commission for the publication of French diplomatic documents).

In Germany, she is a member of the KGParl Kommission für Geschichte des Parlamentarismus und der politischen Parteien (Commission for the History of Parliament and Political Parties), Berlin. Since 2020, she has been a member of the Senate of the Leibniz Association, one of the German steering bodies for non-university research.

Her list of publications includes several monographs, editorships of books, and about 100 contributions to collectives or articles in peer-reviewed journals. Since 2015, Miard-Delacroix has been an appointed co-editor of the journal Akten zur Auswärtigen Politik der Bundesrepublik Deutschland (AAPD) (Diplomatic Acts of the Federal Republic of Germany), Berlin.

== Awards and honours ==
- 1991, Prix Strasbourg, doctorate thesis (Partenaires de choix? Le chancelier Schmidt et la France 1974-1982)
- 2012, Prix Maurice Baumont, Académie des Sciences morales et politiques
- 2017, Prix international de la recherche, Fondation Max Weber
- 2022, Reimar Lüst Prize, Alexander von Humboldt Foundation

=== Distinctions ===
- 2007, Knight, Ordre des Palmes académiques
- 2010, Knight, Order of Merit of the Federal Republic of Germany
- 2018, Knight, Académie des Sciences Morales et Politiques
- 2019, Chevalière de l’Ordre national du mérite

== Selected works ==
=== Books ===
- Ennemis héréditaires ? Un dialogue franco-allemand, with Andreas Wirsching, Paris, Fayard, 2020
- Von Erbfeinden zu guten Nachbarn. Ein deutsch-französischer Dialog, with Andreas Wirsching, Stuttgart, Reclam, 2019
- Willy Brandt, Life of a Statesman, London, New-York, I.B. Tauris, 2016
- Willy Brandt, Paris, Fayard, 2013
- Le défi européen. Histoire Franco-allemande de 1963 à nos jours, Lille-Villeneuve d’Ascq, Presses du Septentrion, 2011.
- Deutsch-französische Geschichte 1963 bis in die Gegenwart. Im Zeichen der Europäischen Einigung. Band 11, Darmstadt, Wissenschaftliche Buchgesellschaft, 2011.
- Question nationale et nationalisme. Perceptions françaises d’une problématique allemande au début des années cinquante, Lille-Villeneuve d’Ascq, Presses du Septentrion, 2004.
- Allemagne, with Alfred Grosser, Paris, Flammarion, collection Dominos, 1994.
- Partenaires de choix ? Le Chancelier Helmut Schmidt et la France, Berne, Paris, New York, Peter Lang, 1993.
