= Aachen Treaty =

2019 agreement between Germany and France

Treaty on Franco-German Cooperation and Integration
German: Vertrag zwischen der Bundesrepublik Deutschland und der Französischen Republik über die deutsch-französische Zusammenarbeit und Integration French: Traité entre la République française et la République fédérale d'Allemagne sur la coopération et l'intégration franco-allemandes).
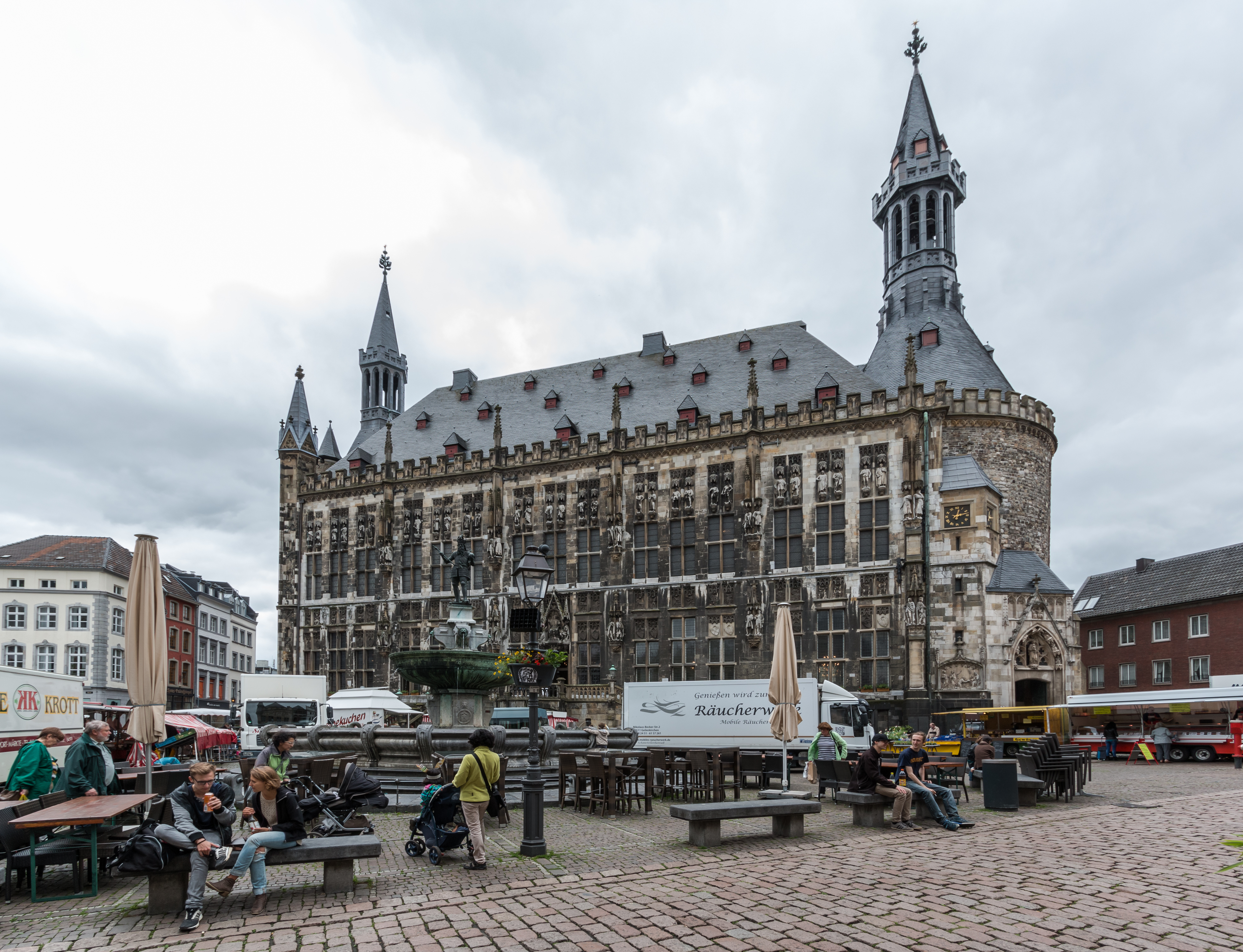
- Town Hall of Aachen where the treaty was signed
- Signed: 22 January 2019
- Location: Aachen, Germany
- Effective: 22 January 2020
- Signatories: France; Germany
- Parties: 2
- Language: French and German

Full text
- Aachen Treaty at Wikisource

The Aachen Treaty, formally Treaty on Franco-German Cooperation and Integration, and also known as the Treaty of Aachen (German: Aachener Vertrag, Vertrag von Aachen, French: Traité d'Aix-la-Chapelle), is a bilateral agreement between Germany and France concerning mutual cooperation across major subjects, which entered into force on 22 January 2020, a year after it was signed. It was signed by Federal Chancellor Angela Merkel and President Emmanuel Macron in the coronation hall of the Aachen City Hall on 22 January 2019.

== History ==
The proposal for a renewal of the Élysée Treaty was first made by Emmanuel Macron on 26 September 2017 in his speech at the Sorbonne. At the 55th anniversary of the Élysée Treaty, both Macron and Angela Merkel again spoke out in favour of deepening the cooperation in business, society, politics and technology.

The coronation hall of the historic Aachen City Hall was chosen for the signing of the new treaty by President Macron and Chancellor Merkel on the Franco-German Day (22 January 2019), the 56th anniversary of the Élysée Treaty, because Aachen, as the main residence of Charlemagne (Charles the Great), represents a common history.

Besides Macron and Merkel the ceremony was also attended by other high-ranking politicians, f.e. Klaus Johannis (President of Romania, chairing the Council of the European Union in the first half of 2019), Jean-Claude Juncker (European Commission President), Donald Tusk (President of the European Council) and Armin Laschet (Minister President of North Rhine-Westphalia).

== Contents ==
The Aachen Treaty consists of a total of 28 articles. The six main chapters of the treaty are labeled:

1. European affairs
2. Peace, security and development
3. Culture, education, research and mobility
4. Regional and transnational cooperation
5. Sustainable development, climate, environment and economic affairs
6. Organization

Among other topics the aim of the contract is to strengthen the cultural diversity (§9) as well as to align security interests of both countries. The Goethe-Institut and the Institut Français plan to jointly open cultural institutions in Erbil, Bishkek, Rio de Janeiro and Palermo on the basis of the Aachen Treaty.

In addition, the contract aims to intensify the cooperation of the defense politics of both countries, including the mutual assistance in potential crisis situations.

The treaty was a factor in the formation of the Franco-German Parliamentary Assembly.

== Critique ==
Several criticisms have been heard since the creation of the Treaty:

- Marine Le Pen's Rassemblement National party stated that the Aachen Treaty would give Alsace to Germany, and that France would share its seat in the UN Security Council with Germany. The claims were refuted by the Élysée Palace and by the newspapers Le Monde and La Croix.

== See also ==
- France–Germany relations
- Schuman Declaration
- History of Europe
