= Histoire/Geschichte =

"Histoire/Geschichte" is a series of Franco-German history coursebooks, published since 2006. The projects aims to create a "shared vision" between French and Germans regarding the history of Europe since Antiquity. The project originated from the "Franco-German Youth Parliament" in Berlin on 21 January 2003 which gathered 500 young pupils from the French and German upper secondary school at the occasion of the 40th anniversary of the Franco-German Élysée Treaty, later taken up by German Department for Foreign Affairs and French Ministry of Education. They suggested the development of a "history coursebook having the same content in both countries so that negative preconceptions caused by mutual ignorance might be avoided".

This coursebook has been available since September 2006 for grade 12 students (Klasse 12/13 in Germany). It is published jointly by Editis in France and Ernst Klett in Germany. A coursebook for grade 11 has also been produced. The set of three coursebooks will cover the period from Antiquity to modern times.

== Distribution and reception ==
Reviews say it is a symbolic token of Franco-German cooperation. In 2008, two years after its creation, 80,000 coursebooks had been sold in each country. Since inception, several other pairs of countries have discussed the possibility of creating a bi-national coursebook, including Czech Republic—Germany, Poland—Germany and Slovak Republic—Hungary.

== Bibliography ==
=== German ===
- Cornelia Frenkel (2008), "VichyWaschi. Der Zweite Weltkrieg im binationalen Geschichtsbuch", Dokumente. Zeitschrift für den deutsch-französischen Dialog Heft 4, ISSN 0012-5172 S. 25 ff. Eine sehr kritische Besprechung des Teils, der sich mit der Judenverfolgung und Judenvernichtung durch das Vichy-Regime und die Deutschen befasst
- Ursula Lange, Transnationales Wissen. Das nationalstaatliche Prinzip im gemeinsamen Geschichtsbuch (PDF) Rezension des Lehrwerks bis ca. 1900, in: ebd., S. 21-24 Beide Art. auch in frz. Sprache erhältlich in der Parallel-Ausgabe Documents. Revue du dialogue franco-allemand Insbes. auch zur sog. Erbfeindschaft.
- "Gemeinsames Geschichtsbuch", Dokumente. Zeitschrift für den deutsch-französischen Dialog, no. 5/06, pp. 53–102, ISSN 0012-5172
- Kończal, Kornelia (2008), Francusko-niemieckie regards croisés, Mówią Wieki, 10, p. 48-51.

=== French ===
- Corine Defrance; Ulrich Pfeil (2007), "Au service du rapprochement franco-allemand. Dialogue d'historiens de part et d'autre du Rhin", Georges Mink et Laure Neumayer (dir.), Paris, pp. 91–103, ISSN 1258-4002, L’Europe et ses passés douloureux, La Découverte
- Corine Defrance et Ulrich Pfeil, « Le manuel franco-allemand d’histoire : l’aboutissement d’un longue travail de coopération entre historiens français et allemands », dans Claire Demesmay et Hans Stark (dir.), Radioscopies de l’Allemagne 2007, Institut français de relations internationales, coll. « Travaux et recherches de l’IFRI » ISSN 1257-9254, Paris, 2007, p. 335–350
- Étienne François, « Le manuel franco-allemand d’histoire : une entreprise inédite », Vingtième Siècle. Revue d'histoire ISSN 0294-1759, nº 94, avril 2007
- Hélène Miard-Delacroix, « Une tâche difficile. Le manuel d’histoire franco-allemand », Documents. Revue des questions allemandes ISSN 0151-0827, année 2006 nº 3
- Ulrich Pfeil, « Comment s’est construit le manuel franco-allemand ? », in Actes des premières Rencontres internationales sur la mémoire partagée, édité par le ministère de la Défense et le ministère des Anciens Combattants et Victimes de guerre, La Documentation française, coll. « Questions de défense » ISSN 1955-2912, Paris, 2007, p. 136-139

== See also ==
- German-Polish Textbook Commission, a similar project by Poland and Germany
