= Congress of Aix-la-Chapelle =

Three congresses have been held at Aix-la-Chapelle:

- Congress of Aix-la-Chapelle (1668)
- Congress of Aix-la-Chapelle (1748)
- Congress of Aix-la-Chapelle (1818)

== See also ==
- Treaty of Aix-la-Chapelle (disambiguation)
