= Franco-German University =

International organisation of universities from Germany and France

Franco–German University
- Université franco-allemande Deutsch-Französische Hochschule
- Abbreviation: UFA / DFH / FGU
- Predecessor: Franco-German College for Higher Education
- Formation: 19 September 1997 (29 years ago)
- Type: Intergovernmental organisation
- Legal status: Statutory corporation
- Headquarters: Saarbrücken, Saarland, Germany
- Region served: France and Germany, Europe
- Fields: Higher education
- Members: 210 universities and colleges (2025/2026)
- Official languages: French and German
- President: Philippe Gréciano
- Vice President: Andrea von Hülsen-Esch
- Parent organization: Federal Ministry of Education and Research (Germany), Ministry of National Education (France)
- Website: dfh-ufa.org

The Franco-German University (FGU, French: Université franco-allemande (UFA), German: Deutsch-Französische Hochschule (DFH)) is an international organisation of universities from Germany and France with the purpose of facilitating international cooperation in higher education. The FGU is not a university in its own right, but rather enables students to study at multiple universities in both countries in a Franco-German course of study, leading to a double degree.

== History and organisation ==
In a first attempt at higher education cooperation, a Franco-German College for Higher Education (German: Deutsch-Französisches Hochschulkolleg, French: Collège franco-allemand pour l'enseignement supérieur) had existed since 1988. That organisation had similar goals, working to promote international academic cooperation and student exchanges.

At the September 1997 Franco-German Summit in Weimar, the French and German governments concluded the Weimar Agreement, deciding to establish the Franco-German University with the intention of international cooperation. The agreement came into effect two years later when the Franco-German University was formally founded.

The organisation is headed in day-to-day administration by a President and a Vice President, of whom one is always French and one is German; and a secretarial office in Saarbrücken. A primary governing body is the University Council, composed of 22 politicians, scientists, industry representatives and other experts from both countries. All full member institutions of the FGU are directly represented in the Assembly of Member Universities, gathering for yearly meetings.
Funding for the FGU is provided by the French and German governments equally, and has steadily been increased since the institution's early days.

== Activity ==
The university primarily enables double degrees at French and German universities, international doctorates, and cooperative research projects; supporting mobility and communication between the countries.

In 2023 the Franco-German University is responsible for more than 6,100 students in 196 courses of study. Most students come from either France or Germany, but some foreign students participate as well. Out of the FGU's 208 member or partner universities and colleges (including grandes écoles and Fachhochschulen in addition to traditional universities), 34 partner institutions are located in third countries — predominantly in Europe, but also Canada, Japan and Morocco.

The university has been called "a remarkable umbrella organization enabling numerous French and German higher education institutions to successfully cooperate in all research areas" by the director of the Franco-German Institute Frank Baasner, and its contribution to the history of Franco-German cooperation recognised.

== See also ==
- Education in the European Union
- Erasmus Programme and Erasmus+
