= Johann Christoph Frisch =

German painter (1738–1815)

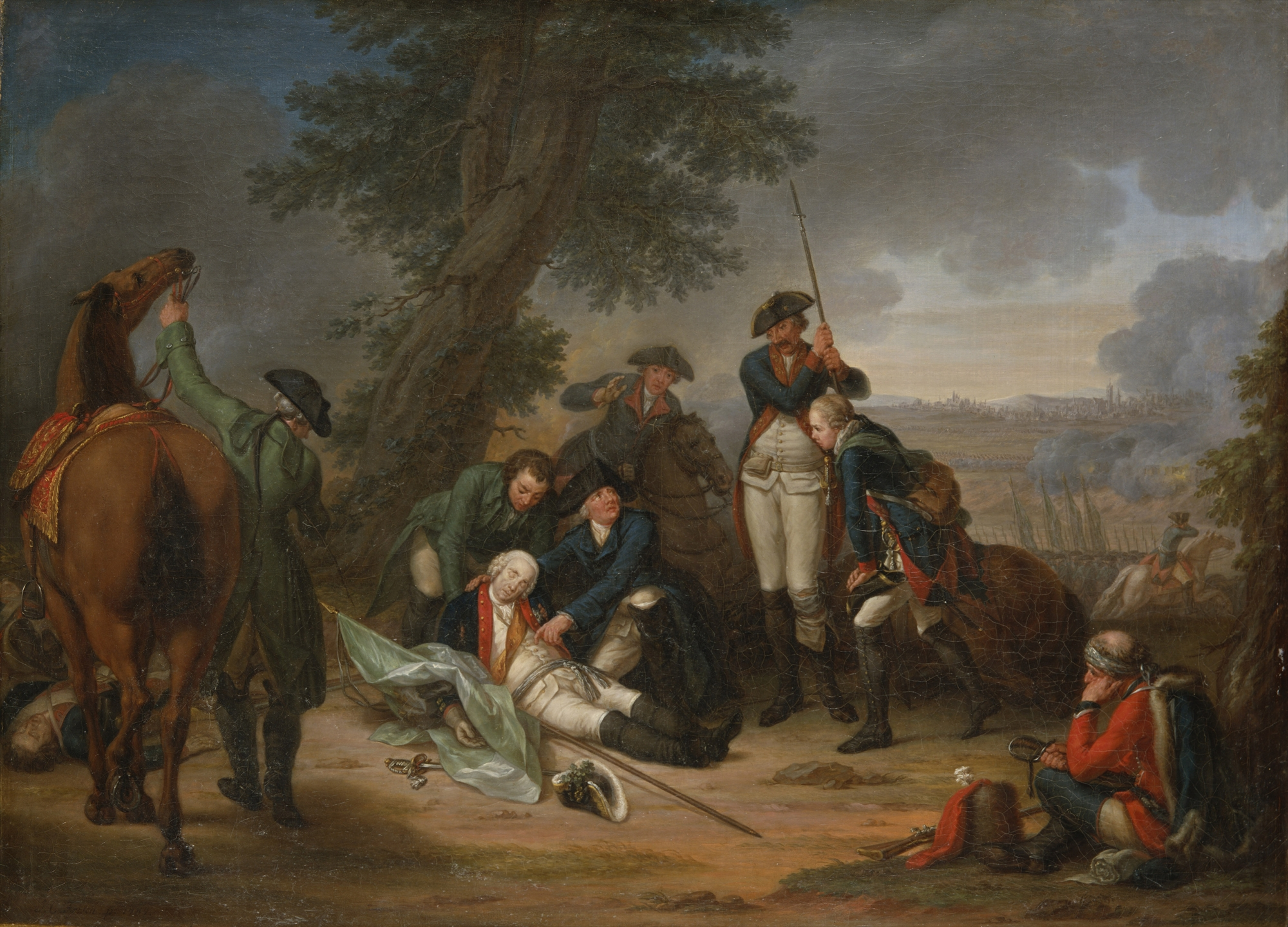
Death of Field Marshal Schwerin at the Battle of Prague, 6th May 1757, now in the New Palace (Potsdam)

Johann Christoph Frisch (1738 - 1815) was a historical painter from the Kingdom of Prussia.

He was born on 9 February 1738 in Berlin, Kingdom of Prussia. He was the son of the designer and engraver, Ferdinand Helfreich Frisch. He was a pupil of B. Rode and afterwards studied further at Rome. He died in 1815, while holding the posts of court painter and director of the Academy. He painted numerous ceilings in the palaces at Berlin, Potsdam, and Sans Souci, with portraits, mythological representations, and scenes from the life of Frederick the Great. He died on 28 February 1815 in Berlin.

== See also ==
- List of German painters
