= France–Germany relations =

- France: Germany

Diplomatic mission
- Embassy of France, Berlin: Embassy of Germany, Paris

Envoy
- Ambassador François Delattre: Ambassador Stephan Steinlein

France–Germany relations, or Franco-German relations, (Note: French: Relations franco-allemandes; German: Deutsch-französische Beziehungen) form a part of the wider politics of the European Union. The two countries have a long and often contentious relationship stretching back to the Middle Ages. Since the aftermath of World War II, the French Republic and the Federal Republic of Germany have largely reconciled. Since the signing of the Treaty of Rome in 1958, they have been among the founders and leading members of the European Communities and later the European Union along with Italy, the Netherlands, Luxembourg and Belgium.

General relations between the two countries since 1871, according to Ulrich Krotz, have had three grand periods: "hereditary enmity" (down to 1945), "reconciliation" (1945–1963) and since 1963 the "special relationship" embodied in a cooperation called Franco-German Friendship. (Note: French: Amitié franco-allemande; German: Deutsch-Französische Freundschaft) In the context of the European Union, the cooperation between the two countries is immense and intimate. Even though France has, at times, been eurosceptical in outlook, especially under President Charles de Gaulle, Franco-German agreements and cooperations have always been key to furthering the ideals of European integration.

In recent times, France and Germany are among the most enthusiastic proponents of the further integration of the EU. They are sometimes described as the "twin engine" or "core countries" pushing for moves. A tram straddling the Franco-German border, across the river Rhine from Strasbourg to Kehl, was inaugurated on 28 April 2017 symbolizing the strength of relations between the two countries. and both involved Franco-German proposal on the Balkan region.

== History ==
=== Early interactions ===
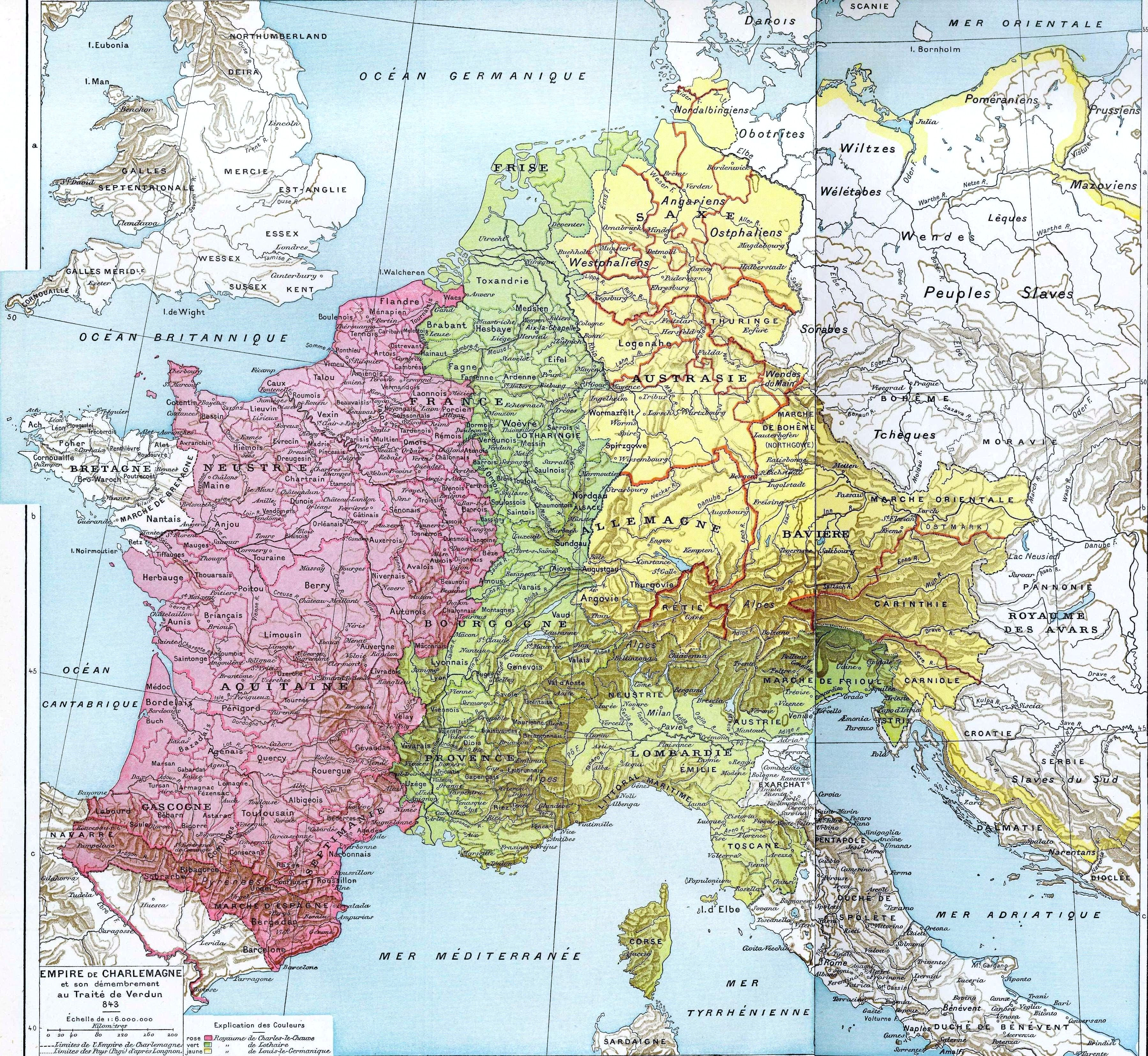
The Carolingian Empire, as divided in 843

Both France and Germany track their early history from the territories of Gaul and Germania, and to the time of Frankish Empire under Charlemagne, which included most of the area of both modern-day France and Germany, as well as the Netherlands, Belgium, Luxembourg, Switzerland, Austria, Slovenia, and northern Italy.

Predecessors, which lived on the territory of modern France and Germany fought together in the Gallic War against Julius Caesar and the Roman Republic between 58 and 50 BC. According to Caesar, the Gallic Volcae Tectosages had once crossed the Rhine and colonized parts of Germania, but had since become militarily inferior to the Germani (Germanic people). He also writes that Germani had once crossed the Rhine into northeast Gaul and driven away its Gallic inhabitants, and that the Belgae claimed to be largely descended from these Germanic invaders. Years later, Both Gaul and Germania were both invaded by the Roman Empire.

Years after the Fall of the Western Roman Empire, The death of Charlemagne's son Louis the Pious and the following partition of the Frankish Empire in the 843 Treaty of Verdun marked the end of a single state. While the population in both the Western and Eastern kingdoms had relative homogeneous language groups (Gallo-Romanic in West Francia, and Low German and High German in East Francia), Middle Francia was a mere strip of a mostly blurring, yet culturally rich language-border-area, roughly between the rivers Meuse and Rhine – and soon partitioned again. After the 880 Treaty of Ribemont, the border between the western and eastern kingdoms remained almost unchanged for some 600 years. Germany went on with a centuries-long attachment with Italy, while France grew into deeper relations with England.

Despite a gradual cultural alienation during the High and Late Middle Ages, social and cultural interrelations remained present through the preeminence of Latin language and Frankish clergy and nobility.

=== France and the Holy Roman Empire ===
The Holy Roman Emperor Charles V, a member of the Austrian House of Habsburg, inherited the Low Countries and the Franche-Comté in 1506. When he also inherited Spain in 1516, France was surrounded by Habsburg territories and felt under pressure. The resulting tension between the two powers caused a number of conflicts such as the War of the Spanish Succession, until the Diplomatic Revolution of 1756 made them allies against Prussia.

The Thirty Years' War (1618–1648), devastating large parts of the Holy Roman Empire, fell into this period. Although the war was mostly a conflict between Protestants and Catholics, Catholic France sided with the Protestants against the Austrian-led Catholic Imperial forces. The Peace of Westphalia in 1648 gave France part of Alsace. The 1679 Treaties of Nijmegen consolidated this result by bringing several towns under French control. In 1681, Louis XIV marched into the city of Strasbourg on 30 September, and proclaimed its annexation.

Meanwhile, the expanding Muslim Ottoman Empire became a serious threat to Austria. The Papal States initiated a so-called Holy League against the "hereditary enemy" of Christian Europe ("Erbfeind christlichen Namens"). Far from joining or supporting the common effort of the Holy Roman Empire and Poland-Lithuania, France, under Louis XIV, invaded the Spanish Netherlands in September 1683, a few days before the Battle of Vienna. While Austria was occupied with the Great Turkish War (1683–1699), France initiated the War of the Grand Alliance (1688–1697). The attempt to conquer large parts of southern Germany ultimately failed when Imperial and Imperial circle troops were withdrawn from the Ottoman border and moved to the region. However, following a scorched earth policy that caused a large public outcry at the time, French troops devastated large parts of the Palatinate, burning down and levelling numerous cities and towns in southern Germany.

=== France and Prussia ===
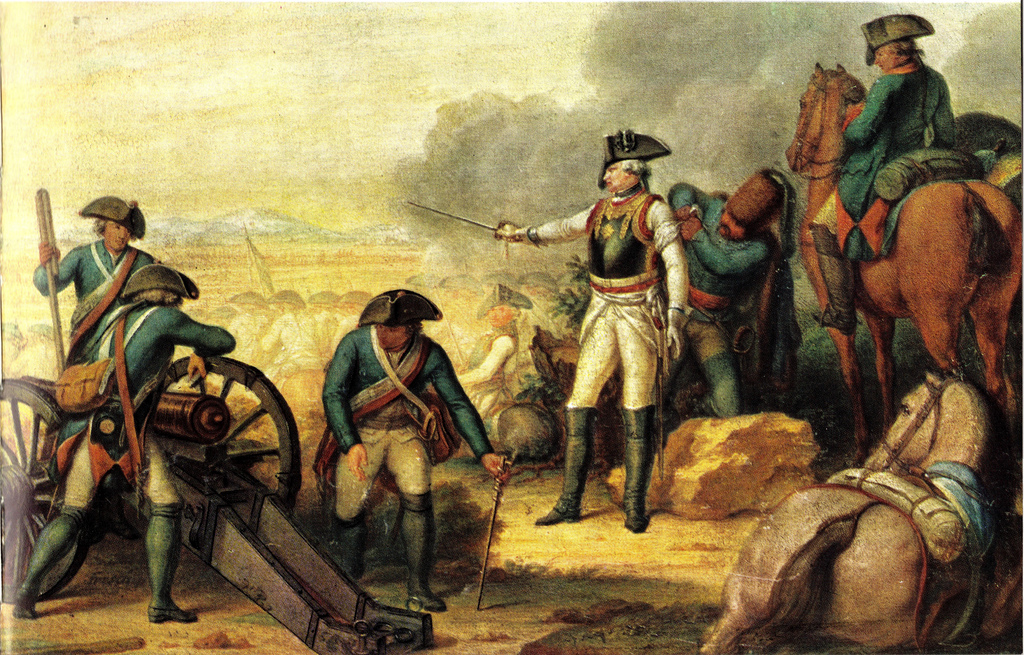
The Prussian troops victorious at the battle of Rossbach. Johann Christoph Frisch, 1799.

In the 18th century, the rise of Prussia as a new German power changed the nature of relations. For a period, France enjoyed closer relations with Prussia, fighting alongside them in the War of the Austrian Succession. However, a split between Great Britain and Austria and the expansion of Prussia led to the Diplomatic Revolution and an alliance between France, the Habsburgs and Russia, in the 1756 Treaty of Versailles and the Seven Years' War against Prussia and Great Britain. Although a German national state was on the horizon, the loyalties of the German population were primarily with smaller states. The French war against Prussia was justified through its role as guarantor of the Peace of Westphalia, and it was in fact fighting on the side of the majority of German states.

Frederick the Great led the defense of Prussia for 7 years, and though heavily outnumbered, defeated his French and Austrian invaders. Prussia and France clashed multiple times, and many more times than the other countries. This started years of hatred between the two countries. Frederick the Great was soon respected by all of his enemies, and Napoleon himself used him as a model for battle.

The civil population still regarded war as a conflict between their authorities, and did not so much distinguish between troops according to the side on which they fought but rather according to how they treated the local population. The personal contacts and mutual respect between French and Prussian officers did not stop entirely while they were fighting each other, and the war resulted in a great deal of cultural exchange between the French occupiers and German population.

=== Impact of French Revolution and Napoleon ===
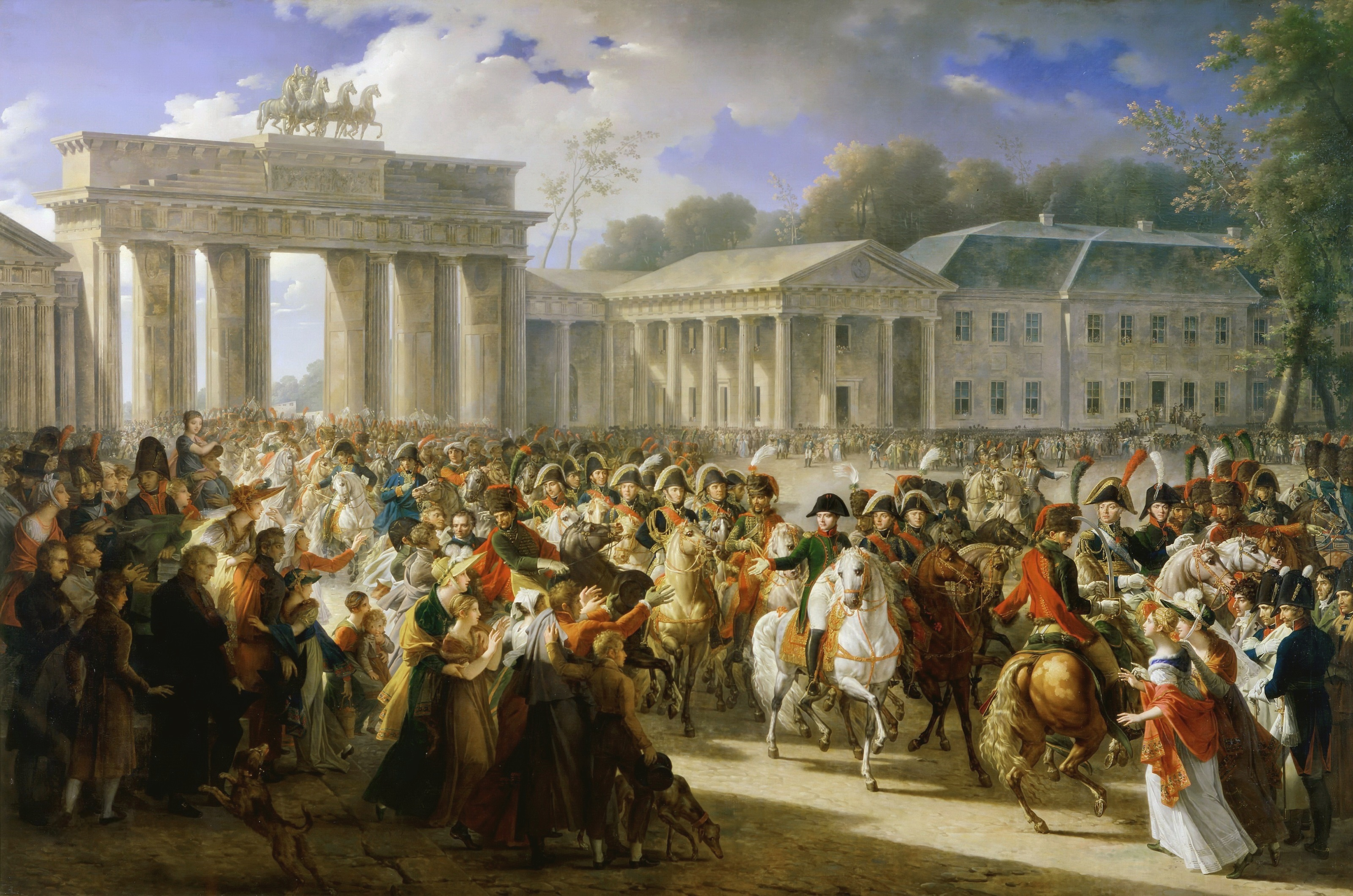
Entry of Napoleon into Berlin by Charles Meynier, 1810. French troops entering Berlin after the Battle of Jena.

German nationalism emerged as a strong force after 1807, as Napoleon conquered much of Germany and brought in the new ideals of the French Revolution. The French mass conscription for the Revolutionary Wars and the beginning formation of nation states in Europe made war increasingly a conflict between peoples rather than a conflict between authorities carried out on the backs of their subjects.

Napoleon put an end to the millennium-old Holy Roman Empire in 1806. Napoleon formed his own Confederation of the Rhine, and reshaped the political map of the German states, which were still divided. The wars, often fought in Germany and with Germans on both sides, as in the Battle of the Nations at Leipzig, also marked the beginning of what was explicitly called French–German hereditary enmity. Napoleon directly incorporated German-speaking areas such as the Rhineland and Hamburg into his First French Empire and treated the monarchs of the remaining German states as vassals. Modern German nationalism was born in opposition to French domination, under Napoleon. In the recasting of the map of Europe after Napoleon's defeat, the German-speaking territories in the Rhineland adjoining France were put under the rule of Prussia.

=== France and Bavaria ===
Bavaria as the third-largest state in Germany after 1815 enjoyed much warmer relations with France than the larger Prussia or Austria. From 1670 onwards, the two countries were allies for almost a century, primarily to counter Habsburg ambitions to incorporate Bavaria into Austria. This alliance was renewed after the rise of Napoleon to power with a friendship treaty in 1801 and a formal alliance in August 1805, pushed for by the Bavarian Minister Maximilian von Montgelas. With French support, Bavaria was elevated to the status of a Kingdom in 1806. Bavaria supplied 30,000 troops for the invasion of Russia in 1812, of which very few returned. With the decline of the First French Empire, Bavaria opted to switch sides on 8 October 1813 and left the French alliance in favour of an Austrian one through the Treaty of Ried.

=== Nineteenth century ===
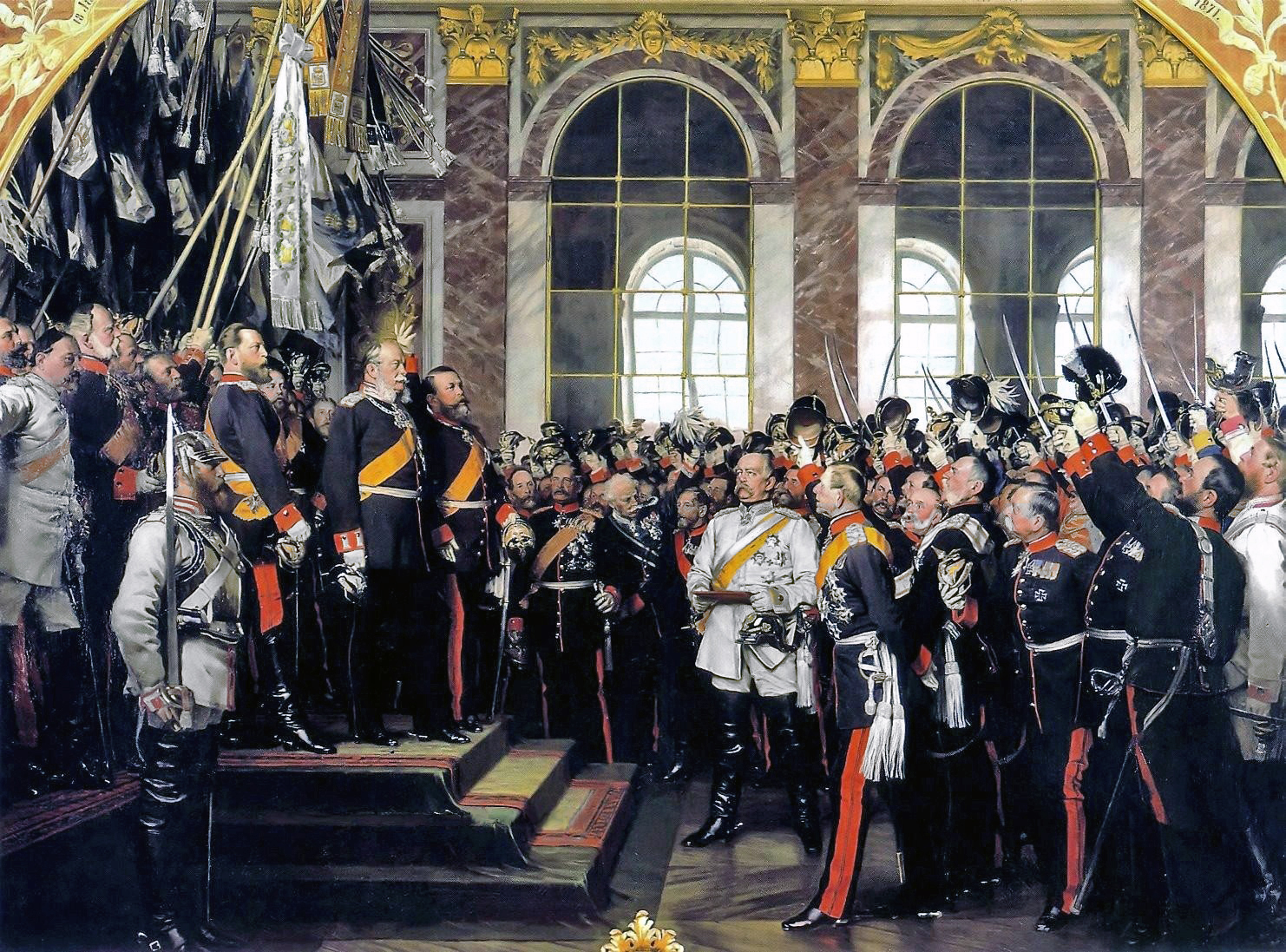
Proclamation of the German Empire at the Palace of Versailles, 18 January 1871, by Anton von Werner

==== Rhine Crisis of 1840 ====
The immediate trigger was France’s diplomatic isolation after the Oriental Crisis (the Eastern Question) particularly Austria, Britain, Prussia, and Russia, the four powers aiming to maintain the balance of power in the region. France’s aggressive foreign policy under Adolphe Thiers shifted focus from the Levant to Europe; Thiers restated the Rhine claim as a bargaining position and domestic rallying cry. The French démarche met firm resistance from the German Confederation, and European powers moved to contain escalation, so the dispute remained diplomatic rather than military. What made the crisis historically important was the mass cultural and political reaction in the German states. Newspapers, pamphlets, and popular songs known as Rheinlieder celebrated the Rhine as “the most German river” and framed its defense as a national duty. This outpouring cut across regional and class lines and is widely seen as a formative episode in the rise of German nationalism during the 1840s. France ultimately retreated from its maximalist demands; Thiers lost political standing and the immediate territorial threat faded without open war. Nevertheless, the episode left a lasting legacy: it demonstrated how public opinion and cultural mobilization could influence international affairs and helped consolidate a shared German political sentiment that later fed into unification movement.

==== German states defeat France, 1870–1871 ====
During the first half of the 19th century, many Germans looked forward to a unification of the German states; one issue was whether Catholic Austria would be a part. German nationalists believed that a united Germany would replace France as the world's dominant land power. This argument was aided by demographic changes: since the Middle Ages, France had the largest population in Western Europe, but in the 19th century its population stagnated (a trend which continued until the second half of the 20th century), and the population of the German states overtook it and continued to rapidly increase.

The eventual unification of Germany was triggered by the Franco-German War in 1870 and subsequent French defeat. German forces defeated the French armies at the Battle of Sedan. Finally, in the Treaty of Frankfurt, reached after a lengthy siege of Paris, France was forced to cede the mostly Germanic-speaking Alsace-Lorraine territory (consisting of most of Alsace and a quarter of Lorraine), and pay an indemnity of five billion francs. Thereafter, Germany was the leading land power.

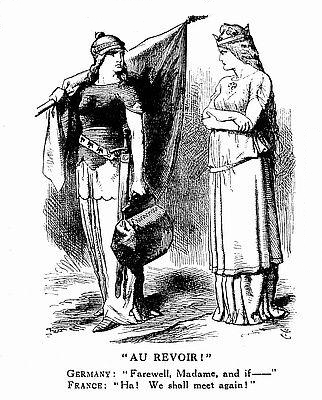
John Tenniel: Au Revoir!, Punch 6 August 1881

Although initially against it, Bismarck eventually gave into the Army and to intense public demand in Germany for acquisition of the border provinces of Alsace and Lorraine, thereby turning France into a permanent, deeply committed enemy. Theodore Zeldin says: "Revenge and the recovery of Alsace-Lorraine became a principal object of French policy for the next forty years. That Germany was France's enemy became the basic fact of international relations." Bismarck's solution was to make France a pariah nation, encouraging royalty to ridicule its new republican status, and building complex alliances with the other major powers – Austria, Russia and Great Britain – to keep France isolated, diplomatically.

==== Late 19th century ====
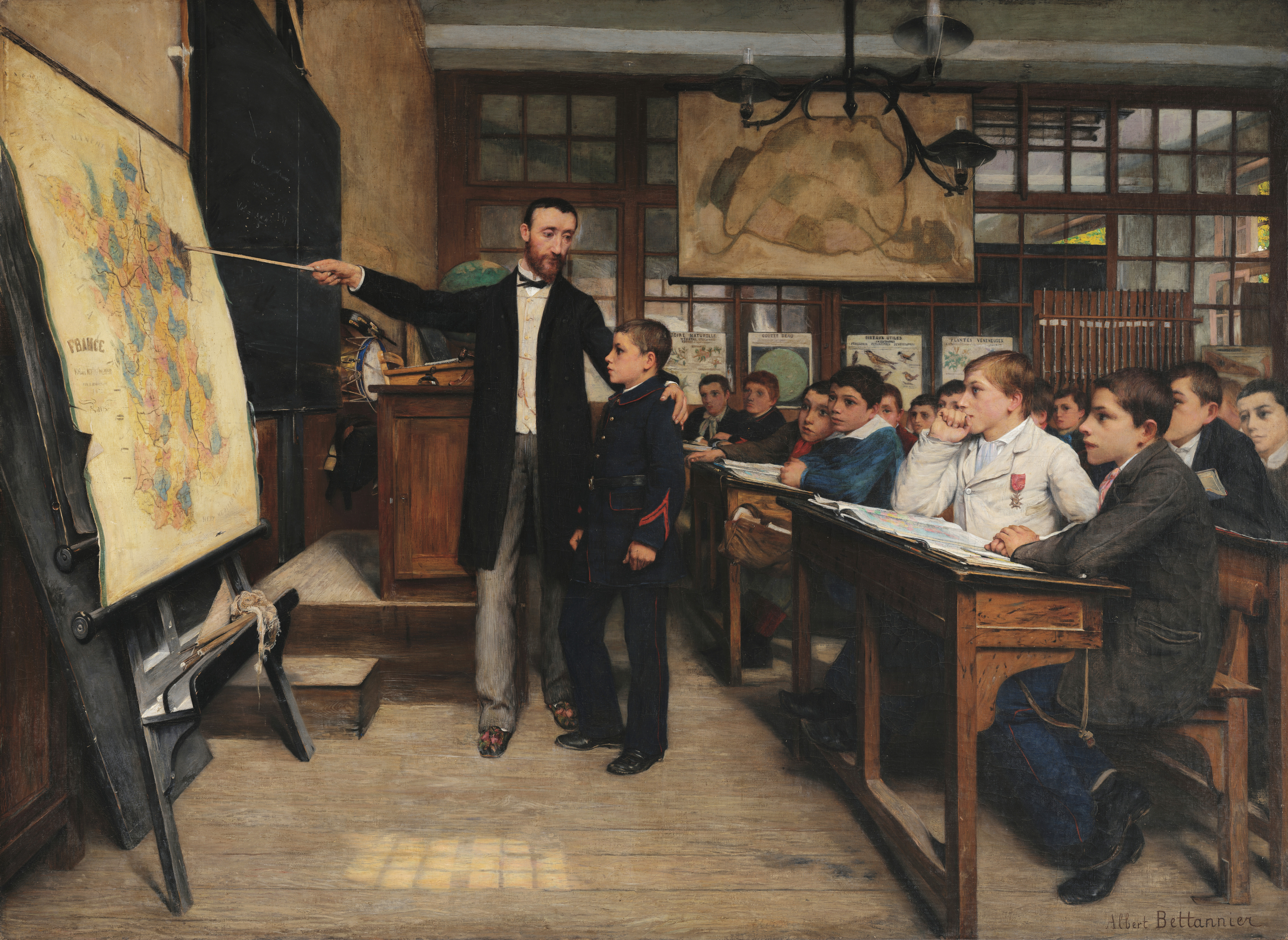
A painting from 1887 depicting French students being taught about the lost provinces of Alsace and Lorraine, taken by Germany in 1871

The short-term French reaction to defeat in the Franco-Prussian War of 1870–1871 was Revanchism: a deep sense of bitterness, hatred and demand for revenge against Germany, especially because of the loss of Alsace and Lorraine. Paintings that emphasized the humiliation of the defeat came in high demand, such as those by Alphonse de Neuville.

The Alsace-Lorraine issue remained a minor theme after 1880, and Republicans and Socialists systematically downplayed the issue and the monarchists (who emphasized the issue) faded away. Revanchism was not a major cause of war in 1914 because it faded after 1880. J.F.V. Keiger says: "By the 1880s, Franco-German relations were relatively good."

The Schnaebele Affair of 1887 was a diplomatic crisis triggered by the arrest of official Wilhelm Schnäbele by German agents, bringing France and Germany perilously closer blink of war. On 21 April, Schnaebelé was arrested by two police of the German border patrol after trespassing across the border. Germany accused him of espionage, claiming he had transmitted information about German fortresses to France. Controversy arose regarding whether the arrest occurred on French or German territory, but France argued that Schnaebelé was entitled to immunity due to his official purpose and the invitation from German authorities. The arrest sparked outrage in France, with war hawk General Georges Ernest Boulanger, a Minister of War known for anti-German rhetoric, pushing for an ultimatum demanding Schnaebelé’s release and proposing mobilization of troops. Meanwhile, in Germany, nationalist and liberal press alike voices demanded no concession and strong measures. General Boulanger’s popularity escalated into potential coup ambitions, increasing pressures on the fragile Third Republic government. The German-Russian treaty pact of neutrality was up for renewal, and Otto von Bismarck was reportedly concerned about the influence of the Panslavist party in Russia, which opposed renewing the alliance. By creating tension with France, Bismarck might have sought to pressure Russia to maintain its neutrality or alliance with Germany. The German and Russian monarchs was reportedly anxious about the escalating tension, leading to direct intervention pushing for Schnaebele’s release to preserve peace. Though war was narrowly avoided, Some historians suggest Bismarck intended strategic maneuvering to test French domestic politics and the incident partly to test French resolve or provoke nationalistic fervor while simultaneously applying diplomatic leverage over Russia.

After industrialization through 1880s, the rapid growth in the population and economy of Germany left France increasingly far behind. In the 1890s, relationships remained good, as Germany supported France during its difficulties with Great Britain over African colonies. Any lingering harmony collapsed in 1905, when Germany took an aggressively hostile position to French claims to Morocco. There was talk of war and France strengthened its ties with Great Britain and Russia.

During the Fashoda Crisis, Germany could have attempted to drive France into confrontation with Britain or encourage a Franco-German pact against Britain. Bernhard von Bülow, as German Foreign Secretary, and other German officials monitored the situation, but internal indecision and overestimation of the risks of direct intervention prevented Germany from pressing any strate. Germany’s failure to intervene and exploit the situation politically allowed Britain to consolidate its African holdings and ensured that France prioritized Anglo-French détente over possible alliances. The German foreign policy under Wilhelm II’s inconsistent signaling, missed diplomatic leverage, and inability to translate observation into concrete action to gains. Historians argue that Germany’s “missed a rare strategic opening” an opportunity to destabilize Anglo-French relations, potentially isolate Britain, and strengthen Germany’s position breaking out isolation incircle before the 20th-century balance of power.

France's involvement in the Anglo–Boer War was marked by a complex relationship with the British Empire. The French’s public opinion held strongly pro-Boer, driven by Anglophobia and anti-British sentiment following the Franco-British imperial rivalry in global affairs, reflecting the fin de siècle sentiment of the time. However, the French government's policy during the early stages of the conflict remained unclear, with some controversy surrounding Foreign Secretary Théophile Delcassé's role in the question of intervention. Delcassé's approach was to seek an with diplomatic leverage point against Britain, potentially an alliance with Germany to particularly regarding the Egyptian question. This was a significant shift from the traditional stance of seeking an amicable settlement with Britain. Delcassé's actions were instrumental in two attempts to persuade Germany to join the Dual Alliance (Entente) in demanding that UK end its military occupation of Egypt.

=== German-French temporarily détente ===
Germany and France, alongside Russia, cooperated internationally as part of the Triple Intervention to influence territory in East Asia. This event exemplifies two traditionally hostile in European affairs following the Franco-Prussian War, could find common ground abroad when aligned together. Both countries participate contributed personnel warships such protected cruiser SMS Kaiserin Augusta and Bugeaud to International Squadron during Cretan Revolt and were integral members of the Eight-Nation Alliance during Boxer Rebellion.

Jules Cambon relied on careful negotiation, personal diplomacy, and intelligence to manage crises, including incidents like the "Deserters of Casablanca" affair in 1908, where the German consul in Casablanca sheltered French Foreign Legion deserters. Cambon’s diplomatic response highlighted his subtle skill in interpreting German intentions and preventing escalation through careful communication and clarification. Throughout his tenure, Cambon sought to mediate between the competing European alliances, subtly easing tensions without committing France to a formal rapprochement that could compromise its strategic position. He recognized that a stable Franco-German relationship would also influence other major powers, particularly in terms of potential support from Russia and Austria-Hungary and allied concerns in a multi-front strategic environment.

=== Tangier and Agadir dispute ===
During the early 20th century, Morocco became a focal point of Franco-German rivalry. France sought to expand its influence, while Germany promoted an “open-door” policy to protect its economic interests. The tension escalated with the First Moroccan Crisis, culminating in the Algeciras Conference of 1906, which recognized Moroccan independence but granted France and Spain policing rights and upheld some German economic privileges.

The 1909 Franco-German Agreement reaffirmed Morocco’s independence while recognizing France’s special political interests and Germany’s economic rights, helping to ease tensions following earlier crises over North African influence.

The later Agadir Crisis of 1911 can be viewed as a violation towards the previous agreement. In response to a rebellion against Sultan Abd al-Hafid, France sent troops to Morocco’s interior in early 1911 to reinforce the Sultan and stabilize the region under Jules Cambon, who was the chief French diplomat with strong collaboration from Joseph Caillaux. While framed as protection of European residents, the deeper aim was consolidation of French colonial authority. Diplomat Waechter, a Swabian native, deployed the gunboat SMS Panther to the port of Agadir on 1 July without Germans government approval and Chancellor Theobald von Bethmann Hollweg who had limited experience in foreign policy and tended to favor negotiation and compromise over confrontation, ostensibly to safeguard German citizens and commercial interests, but primarily as leverage to demand territorial compensation in Africa. This naval action was a direct challenge to French political ascendancy.

=== First World War ===
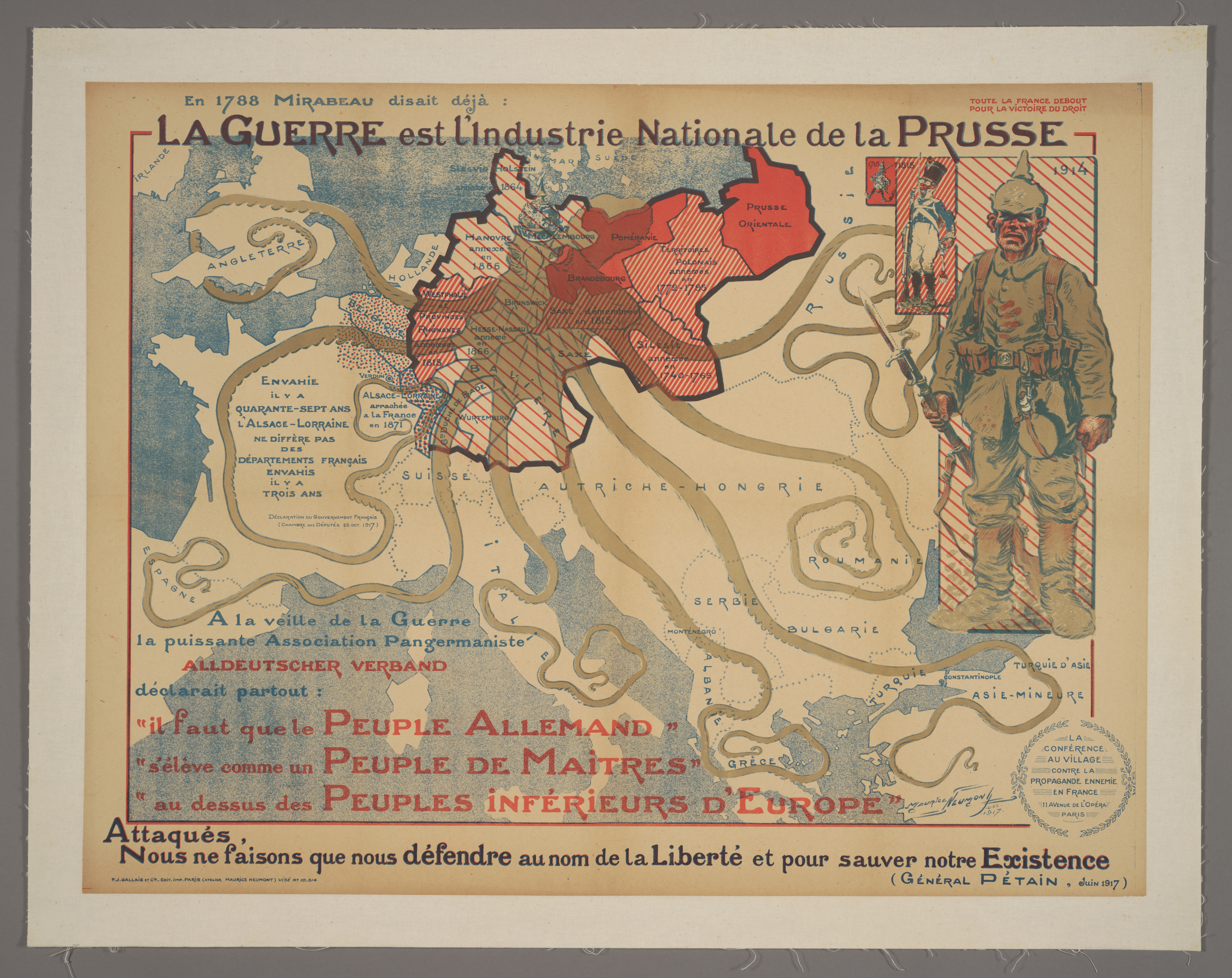
A French propaganda poster from 1917 portrays Prussia as an octopus stretching out its tentacles vying for control. It is captioned with an 18th-century quote: "Even in 1788, Mirabeau was saying that War is the National Industry of Prussia."

The French public had very little interest in foreign affairs and elite French opinion was strongly opposed to war with its more powerful neighbor. French foreign policy was based on a fear that Germany was larger and steadily growing more powerful. In 1914 the chief pressure group was the Parti colonial, a coalition of 50 organizations with a combined total of only 5,000 members. When war broke out in 1914, recovery of the two lost provinces became France's primary war aim.

After Bismarck's removal in 1890, French efforts to isolate Germany became successful; with the formation of the Triple Entente, Germany began to feel encircled. Foreign minister Delcassé, especially, went to great pains to woo Russia and Great Britain. Key markers were the Franco-Russian Alliance of 1894, the 1904 Entente Cordiale with Great Britain, and finally the Anglo-Russian Entente in 1907 which became the Triple Entente. This formal alliance with Russia, and informal alignment with Britain, against Germany and Austria-Hungary eventually led Russia and Britain to enter World War I as France's Allies.

In 1917, militarily, Germany might have achieved a local breakthrough if it had concentrated forces against a mutinous French sector. This was a direct consequence of the catastrophic failure of the Nivelle Offensive, and it created a moment of acute vulnerability on the Western Front, with 60 of 113 divisions temporarily revolting. Yet Germany did not launch an attack despite its limited intelligence network.

In the same year, the Briand-Lancken affair unfolded as a discreet diplomatic endeavor during the Great War, involving Aristide Briand, the former French Prime Minister, in indirect attempts to initiate peace effort with Germany. Although no longer serving as President of the Council (Prime Minister) after his 1917 resignation, Aristide Briand maintained influence within French political circles and was receptive to confidential peace initiatives. The affair derives its name from Baron de Lancken, a German official stationed in occupied Belgium. Lancken surmised that discreet communications might indicate French receptiveness to peace discussions under specific conditions. This initiative ultimately proved unsuccessful, primarily due to German inflexibility, skepticism from the Allied powers, and internal political constraints within France. French authorities, including President Raymond Poincaré, exercised caution regarding any peace overtures that could be perceived as weakness, leading to Briand's involvement being largely circumstantial rather than authoritative. This episode contributed to the broader understanding of failed peace efforts in 1917, strengthening Allied determination against German proposals and influencing post-war interpretations of war responsibility.

=== 1920s ===
The Allied victory saw France regain Alsace-Lorraine and briefly resume its old position as the leading land power on the European continent. France was the leading proponent of harsh peace terms against Germany at the Paris Peace Conference. Since the war had been fought on French soil, it had destroyed much of French infrastructure and industry, and France had suffered the highest number of casualties proportionate to population. Much French opinion wanted the Rhineland, the section of Germany west of the Rhine river and the old focus of French ambition, to be detached from Germany as an independent country. In the end they settled for heavy German reparation payments, the military occupation of the Rhineland (1918–1930) and the demilitarization of it and an area stretching 50 kilometers east of the Rhine. On the remote Eastern end of the German Empire, the Memel territory was separated from the rest of East Prussia and occupied by France, before being annexed by Lithuania. In response to German failure in 1923 to pay reparations as required under the Treaty of Versailles, France occupied the industrial Ruhr area of Germany, the center of German coal and steel production, until 1925. Also, the French-dominated International Olympic Committee banned Germany from the Olympic Games of 1920 and 1924, illustrating French desire to isolate Germany.

==== Locarno treaties of 1925 ====
In late 1924 German foreign minister Gustav Stresemann, labelled the 'greatest master of German foreign policy since Bismarck', was committed to delivering economic and political stability. French withdrawal from the occupied Ruhr was scheduled for January 1925, but Stresemann sensed that France was very nervous about its security and might cancel the withdrawal. He realized that France deeply desired a British guarantee of its postwar borders, but that London was reluctant. Stresemann came up with a plan whereby all sides would get what they wanted through guarantees set out in a series of treaties. British Foreign Minister Austen Chamberlain enthusiastically agreed. France realized that its occupation of the Ruhr had caused more financial and diplomatic damage than it was worth and went along with the plan. They convened a conference of foreign ministers in the Swiss resort of Locarno and worked out the treaties. The first was the most critical: a mutual guarantee of the frontiers of Belgium, France, and Germany, which was guaranteed by Britain and Italy. The second and third treaties called for arbitration between Germany and Belgium, and Germany and France regarding future disputes. The fourth and fifth were similar arbitration treaties between Germany and Poland, and Germany and Czechoslovakia. Poland especially, and Czechoslovakia as well, felt threatened by the main Locarno agreement, and the treaties were attempts to reassure them. The success of the Locarno agreements led to the admission of Germany to the League of Nations in September 1926, with a seat on its council as a permanent member. The result was the euphoric "Spirit of Locarno" across Europe—a sense that it was possible to achieve peace and a permanent system guaranteeing that peace.

==== Kellogg–Briand Pact of 1928 ====
The Pact represented a pivotal achievement in the normalization of Franco-German relations during the late 1920s, further advancing the "Spirit of Locarno." It solidified this period of détente by affording Germany equal signatory status alongside Great Britain, Italy, Japan, and the United States, thereby moving beyond its prior designation as a defeated power subject to restrictions, and aimed to establish a legal framework for global peace, despite ultimately lacking robust enforcement mechanisms.

=== 1930s ===
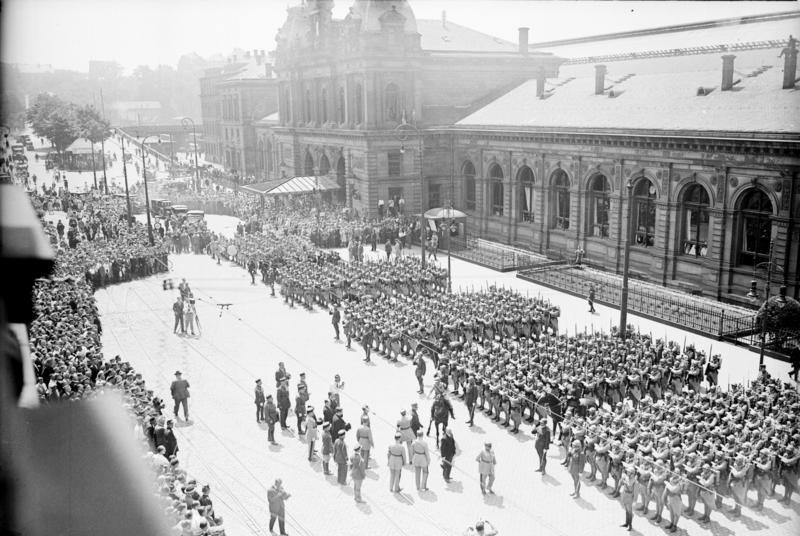
French Army troops gathering before their departure from Rhineland, occupied Mainz, 1930

Following the death of Stresemann in 1929, the Great Depression offered new challenges for French-German relations, even if politicians still attempted to bring about a détente. The Depression plunged Germany into economic hardship and internal unrest which aided the growth of the Nazi Party. From 1933, under Adolf Hitler, Germany began to pursue an aggressive policy in Europe. Meanwhile, France in the 1930s was politically divided. Above all, the country dreaded another war; the French feared would again be fought on their soil for the third time, and again destroy a large percentage of their young men. France's stagnant population meant that it would find it difficult to withhold the sheer force of numbers of a German invasion; it was estimated Germany could put two men of fighting age in the field for every French soldier. Thus in the 1930s the French, with their British allies, pursued a policy of appeasement of Germany, failing to respond to the remilitarization of the Rhineland, although this put the German army on a larger stretch of the French border.

Four Power Pact was signed in July 1933 during the interwar period, a time marked by political instability in Europe after World War I and the limitations of the League of Nations. The pact was chiefly proposed by Benito Mussolini of Italy as a means to reduce the influence of smaller nations in European diplomacy and to strengthen coordination among major powers into anti-Soivet bloc, particularly in managing conflicts and security issues effectively. Freach and German Foreign Minister was represented by Aristide Briand and Baron Konstantin von Neurath. However, The pact was not ratified by the French Parliament and ultimately failed due to France's refusal. Germany have national interests as well mutual distrust towards France encourage alliances with Eastern European countries.

=== Second World War ===
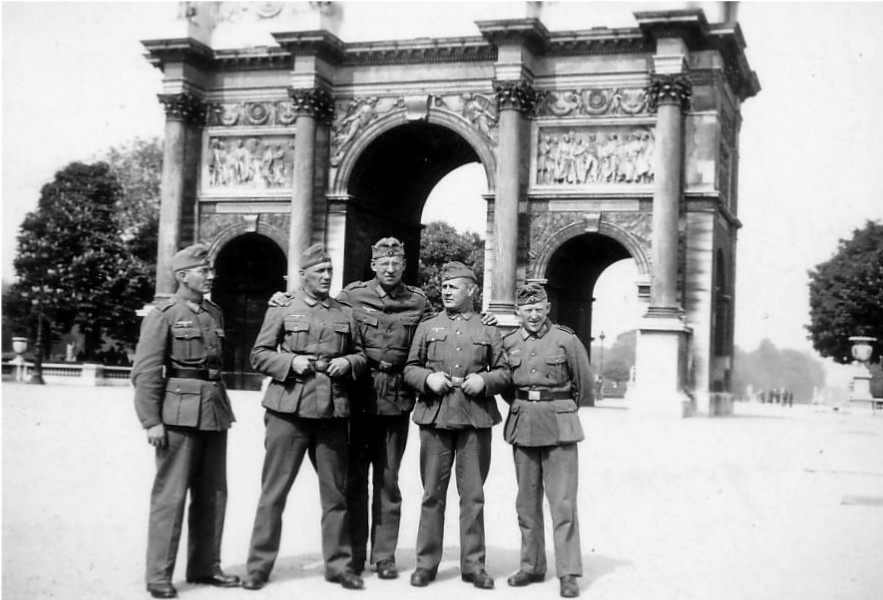
German Wehrmacht soldiers in front of the Arc de Triomphe du Carrousel, occupied Paris, 1940

Finally, however, Hitler pushed France and Great Britain too far, and they jointly declared war when Germany invaded Poland in September 1939. But, France remained exhausted and in no mood for a rerun of 1914–18. There was little enthusiasm and much dread in France at the prospect of actual warfare after the Phoney War. When the Germans launched their blitzkrieg invasion of France in 1940, the French Army crumbled within weeks, and with Britain retreating, an atmosphere of humiliation and defeat swept France.

A new government under Marshal Philippe Pétain surrendered, and German forces occupied most of the country. A minority of the French forces escaped abroad and continued the fight under General Charles de Gaulle and Free France. On the other hand, the French Resistance conducted sabotage operations inside German-occupied France. To support the invasion of Normandy of 1944, various groups increased their sabotage and guerrilla attacks; organizations such as the Maquis derailed trains, blew up ammunition depots, and ambushed Germans, for instance at Tulle. The 2nd SS Panzer Division Das Reich, which came under constant attack and sabotage on their way across the country to Normandy, suspected the village of Oradour-sur-Glane of harboring resistance members, arms and explosives. In retaliation, they destroyed the town in the Oradour-sur-Glane massacre, killing 642 of its inhabitants.

There was also a free French army fighting with the Allies, numbering almost five hundred thousand men by June 1944, one million by December and 1.3 million by the end of the war. By the war's end, the French army occupied south-west Germany and a part of Austria.

=== France, Germany and United Europe ===
==== Pre-1944 ideas of France-German cooperation ====
Marshal Pétain, who ruled France under German supervision, 1940–44, adopted the ideology of National Revolution which was originally based on ideas which had been discussed for years. When the Franco-German reconciliation committee "Comité France-Allemagne" ("French-German Friendship Committee") founded in 1935 in Paris it was an important element for Germany to get closer to France. It adopted Pro-European, Pro-German, anti British, anti liberal political and economic views. Key members of the Committee became the key leaders of the French collaborators with Nazis after 1940.

When Pétain officially proclaimed the collaboration policy with Nazi Germany in June 1941, he justified it to the French people as an essential need for the New European Order and to keep the unity of France. Therefore, much of WW2 French propaganda was pro-European, exactly as German propaganda was. Therefore, a group called "Group Collaboration" had been established during the war in France, and led a myriad of conferences promoting Pro-Europeanism. The very first time the expression "European Community" was used was at its first sessions, as well as many conferences and guests lectures sponsored by the German government, propagating French-German reconciliation, French renewal and European solidarity.

==== Post-war Europe ====
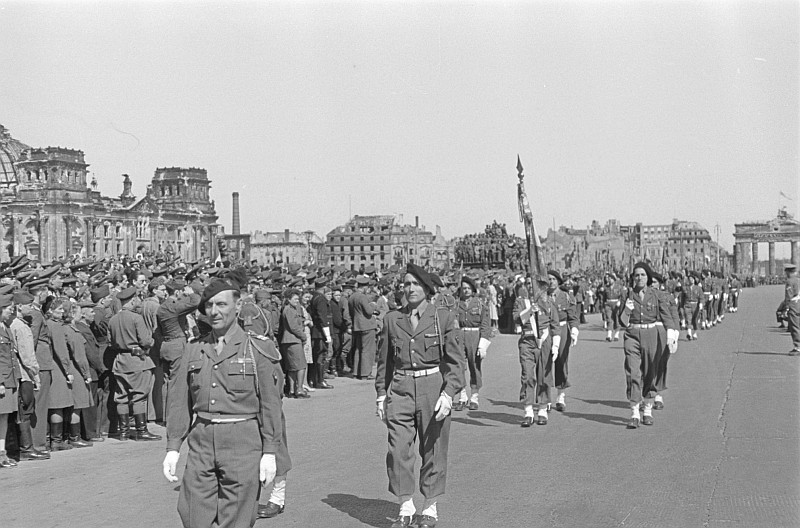
French forces in front of the Reichstag, occupied Berlin, 1946

The war left Europe in a weak position and divided between capitalism in the West, and communism in the East. For the first time in the history of Europe, both Americans and Soviets had a strategic foothold on the continent. Defeated Germany was under the control of the U.S., USSR, United Kingdom and France, until 1949. Soviet troops remained in those countries in Eastern Europe that had been liberated by the Red Army from the Nazis and ensured the political success of Communist parties controlled by the Kremlin.

The French, under De Gaulle, hoped to be a balancing act in 1945–46. French fears of a resurgent Germany made it reluctant to support the plan to merge the British and American zones of occupation. However, growing anger at the Soviets behaviour in Poland, and the need for American economic assistance, led the French to merge their zone into what became West Germany.

In 1947, the American Secretary of State, George Marshall, announced the Marshall Plan to help economic recovery, economic integration, and business-oriented modernization in Europe. Large sums went to France and Germany, which helped restore trade and financial relations. The Marshall Plan recipients set up the Organisation for European Economic Co-operation (OEEC) in 1948.

The idea of a Franco-German federation was a proposed merger between France and Germany after the end of World War II. The idea was promoted by French politician Robert Schuman in his declaration on 9 May 1950, which is now celebrated as Europe Day. The aim of the proposal was to create a lasting peace between the two countries and to promote economic cooperation.

The Franco-German federation proposal envisioned a common government, currency, and military. It also sought to establish a European Coal and Steel Community (ECSC), which would integrate the coal and steel industries of France and Germany. The ECSC was created in 1952 and was the first step toward the creation of the European Union.

While the idea of a Franco-German federation never fully materialized, the proposal laid the foundation for the European Union and the close cooperation between France and Germany that has been a driving force behind European integration. Today, France and Germany are considered to be the engine of European integration and have played a key role in the creation of the European Monetary Union, the Schengen Agreement, and the European Stability Mechanism.

==== Franco-German cooperation in the European Union ====
Earlier in 1948, there were significant key leaders in the French civil service who favoured an agreement with the Germans as well as an integrated Europe that would include Germany. The French European Department was working on a coal and steel agreement for the Ruhr-Lorraine-Luxembourg area, with equal rights for all. One French civil servant recommended 'laying down the bases of a Franco-German economic and political association that would slowly become integrated into the framework of the evolving Western organization'. Deighton strongly illustrated that the French leaders sought the cooperation with the Germans as key factor on the path of integrated Europe.

On a more practical level the increased level of cooperation between West Germany and France were driven by de Gaulle’s desire to build a power-bloc independently of the US, while Adenauer sought a fast integration into the western structures to receive full rights for the still occupied West German state as well as protection against the Soviet threat. The issue of dependency on the USA remained a sore spot at least for as long as DeGaulle remained in office (e.g. the West German parliament included a pro-NATO preamble into the Élysée Treaty, which caused considerable consternation with the French government). However, their shared interest in increased cooperation still existed and was also driven by strong support in the respective civil society, as it was seen as the best solution to prevent further bloodshed between the two nations.

In like manner, the German minister of economics Ludwig Erhard created a significant evolution in the German economy and a durable, well established trading relationship between the Federal Republic and its European neighbours as well. Later on when the Treaty of Rome came into action in 1958, it took the responsibility to strengthen and sustain the new political and economic relationships that had developed between the German nation and its former victims in Western Europe. The treaty beside it included side deals; it created a customs union and established the rules needed to make the competition mechanism work properly.

As a sequence of this, booming European economies, fired by West Germany, led to the formation of the new customs union known as the European Economic Community (EEC). But it did not go well as the organization of Europe, because only the members of the coal and steel community 'ECSC' ("the six": Belgium, France, Italy, Luxembourg, the Netherlands and West Germany) joined the EEC. Seven of the remaining nations belonging to the Organization of European Economic Cooperation (OEEC) which administered the Marshall Plan, did not join the EEC, but instead formed an alternative body, the European Free Trade Association (EFTA). It was a free trade area as opposed to a customs union with common external tariffs and a political agenda, competing with the EEC as it was remarkably successful.

=== Friendship ===
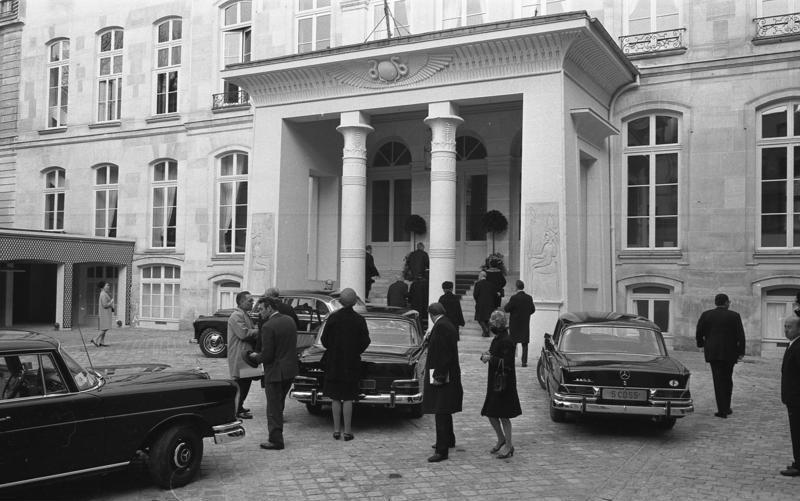
Guests arriving for the initiation of a new West German Embassy building in Paris, 1968

With the threat of the Soviet Union during the Cold War, West Germany sought its national security in the re-integration into Western Europe, while France sought after a reestablishment as a Grande Nation. The post-war Franco-West German cooperation is based on the Élysée Treaty, which was signed by Charles de Gaulle and Konrad Adenauer on 22 January 1963. The treaty contained a number of agreements for joint cooperation in foreign policy, economic and military integration and exchange of student education.

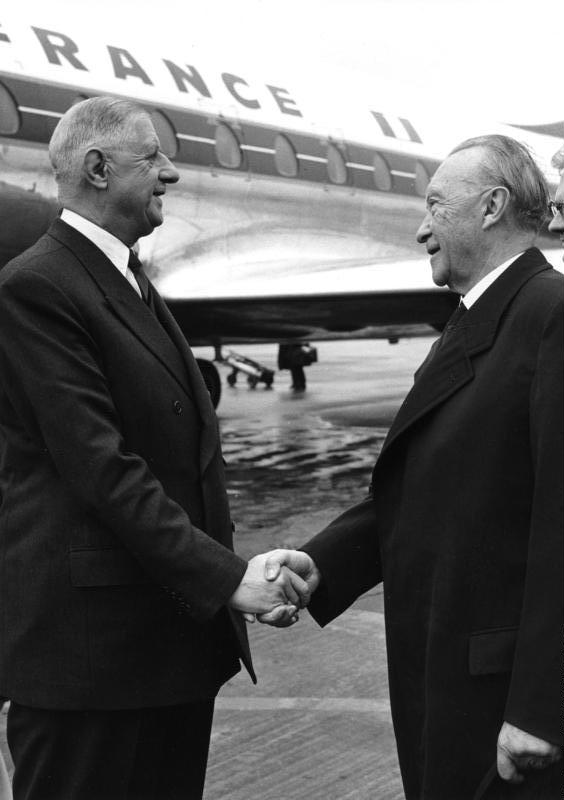
Charles de Gaulle and Konrad Adenauer in 1961

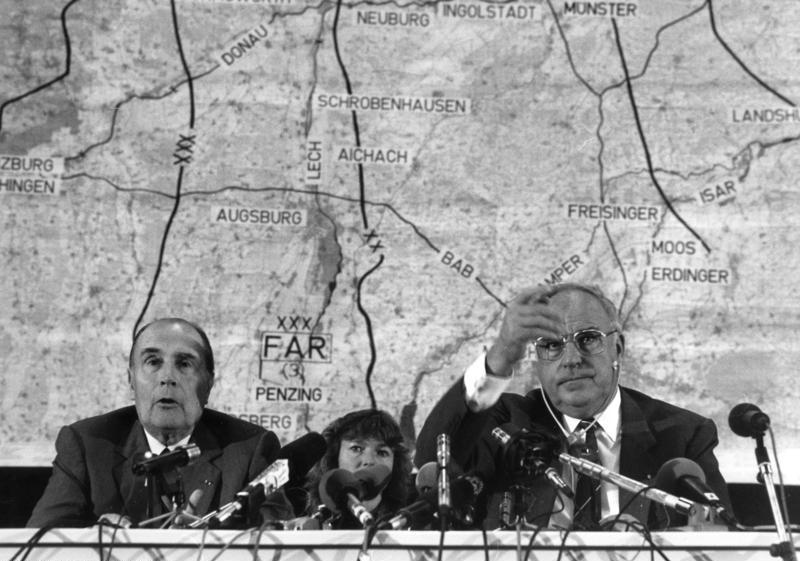
François Mitterrand and Helmut Kohl in 1987

The treaty was signed under difficult political situations at that time and criticized both by opposition parties in France and West Germany, as well as from the United Kingdom and the United States. Opposition from the United Kingdom and the United States was answered by an added preamble which postulated a close cooperation with those (including NATO) and a targeted German reunification.

The treaty achieved a lot in initiating European integration and a stronger Franco-West German co-position in transatlantic relations.

The initial concept for the Franco-German cooperation however dates back a lot further than the Élysée Treaty and is based on the overcoming the centuries of Franco-German hostilities within Europe. It was compared to a re-establishment of Charlemagne's European empire as it existed before division by the Treaty of Verdun in 843 AD.

The Schuman declaration of 1950 is regarded by some as the founding of Franco-German cooperation, as well as of the European Coal and Steel Community (ECSC) of 1951, which also included Italy, Belgium, the Netherlands and Luxembourg.

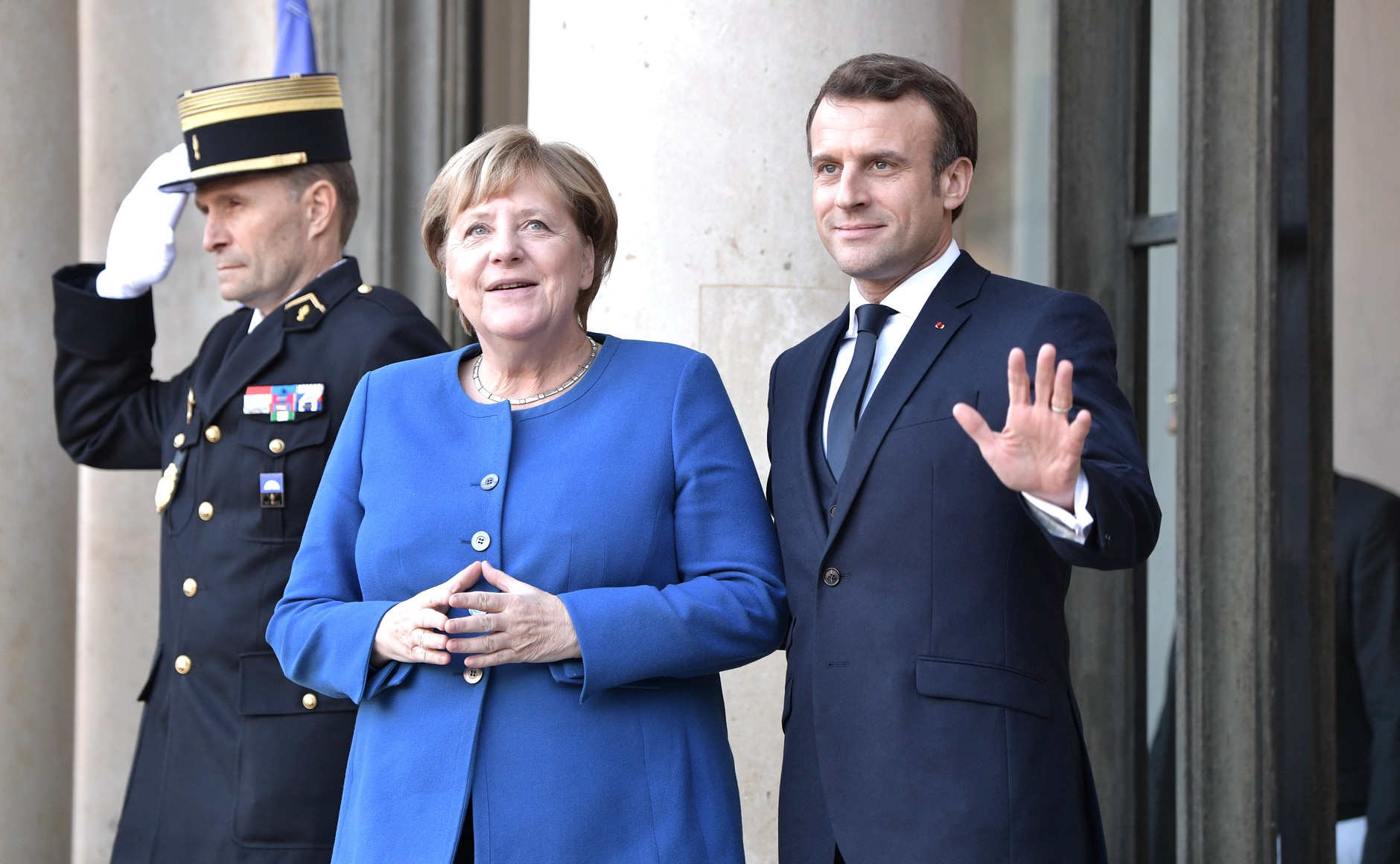
German Chancellor Angela Merkel and French President Emmanuel Macron in Paris in December 2019

The cooperation was accompanied by strong personal alliance in various degrees:

- Konrad Adenauer and Charles de Gaulle (1958–1963)
- Willy Brandt and Georges Pompidou (1969–1974)
- Helmut Schmidt and Valéry Giscard d'Estaing (1974–1981)
- Helmut Kohl and François Mitterrand (1982–1995)
- Helmut Kohl and Jacques Chirac (1995–1998)
- Gerhard Schröder and Jacques Chirac (1998–2005)
- Angela Merkel and Jacques Chirac (2005–2007)
- Angela Merkel and Nicolas Sarkozy (2007–2012)
- Angela Merkel and François Hollande (2012–2017)
- Angela Merkel and Emmanuel Macron (2017–2021)
- Olaf Scholz and Emmanuel Macron (2021–2025)
- Friedrich Merz and Emmanuel Macron (2025–present)

== Alliances ==
=== Economic alliances ===
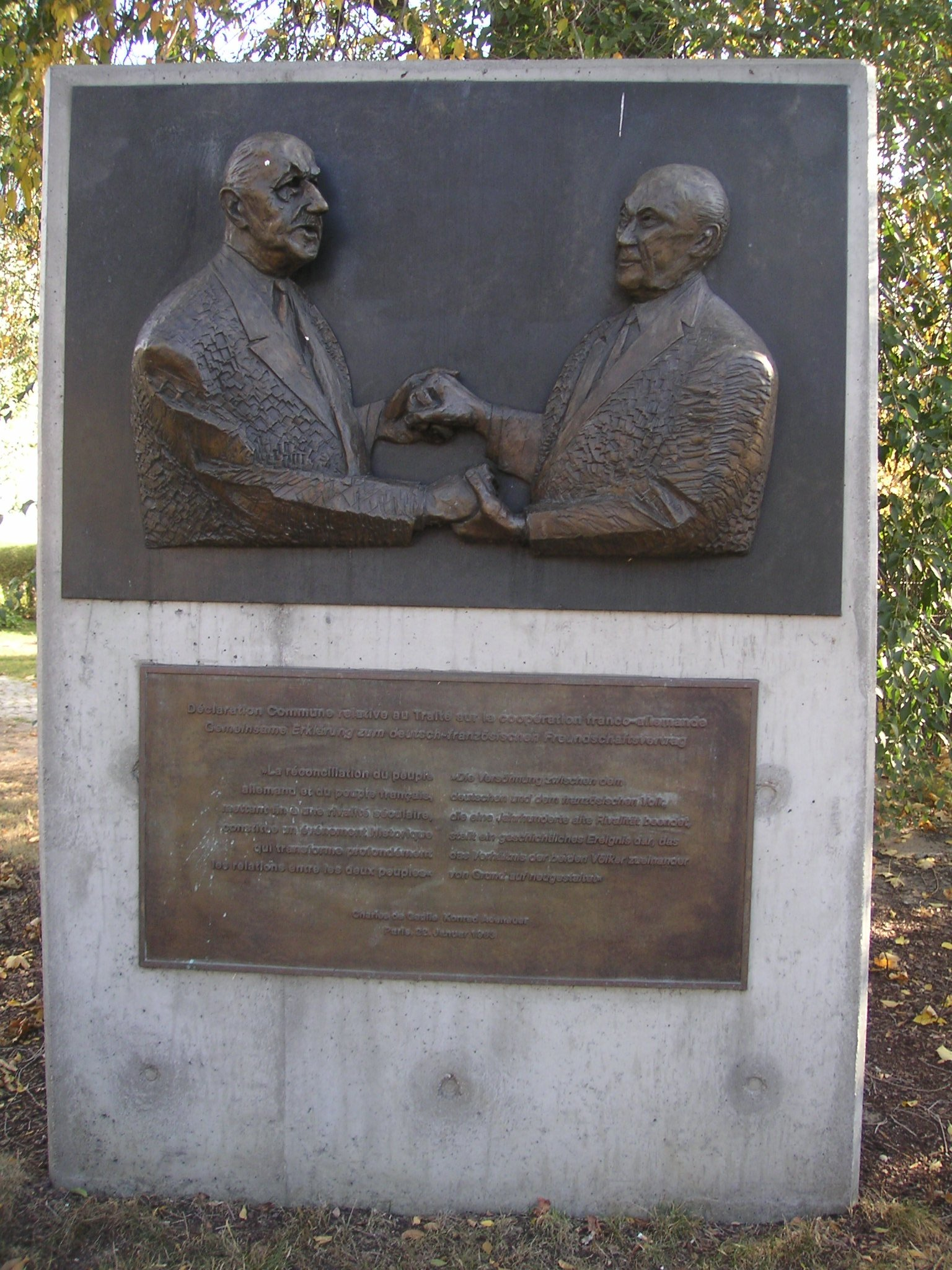
Sculpture of Konrad Adenauer and Charles de Gaulle

- European Space Agency (with many other European states)
- EADS (with two CEOs)
  - Airbus (also present in the UK and Spain)

Franco-German collaborative enterprises include;

- Areva
- Aventis
- ODDO BHF, a Franco German bank

=== Cultural alliances ===
- Promotion of French and German language in both countries (See Alsace).
- Creation of a joint Franco-German History Coursebook to promote a "shared vision of History"
- The Franco-German University was created in 1999 to enable cooperation in tertiary education.
- Arte, Franco-German cultural TV-channel

=== Military alliances ===
- From its inception during the 1960s, the Eurocorps has contained large contingents of French and German troops at its core, while other EU nations have contributed soldiers to the multinational force. The Franco-German Brigade takes much of its infantry from France and much of its armour from Germany.

== Resident diplomatic missions ==
- France has an embassy in Berlin and consulates-general in: Düsseldorf, Frankfurt, Hamburg, Munich, Saarbrücken and Stuttgart.
- Germany has an embassy in Paris and consulates-general in: Bordeaux, Lyon, Marseille and Strasbourg.
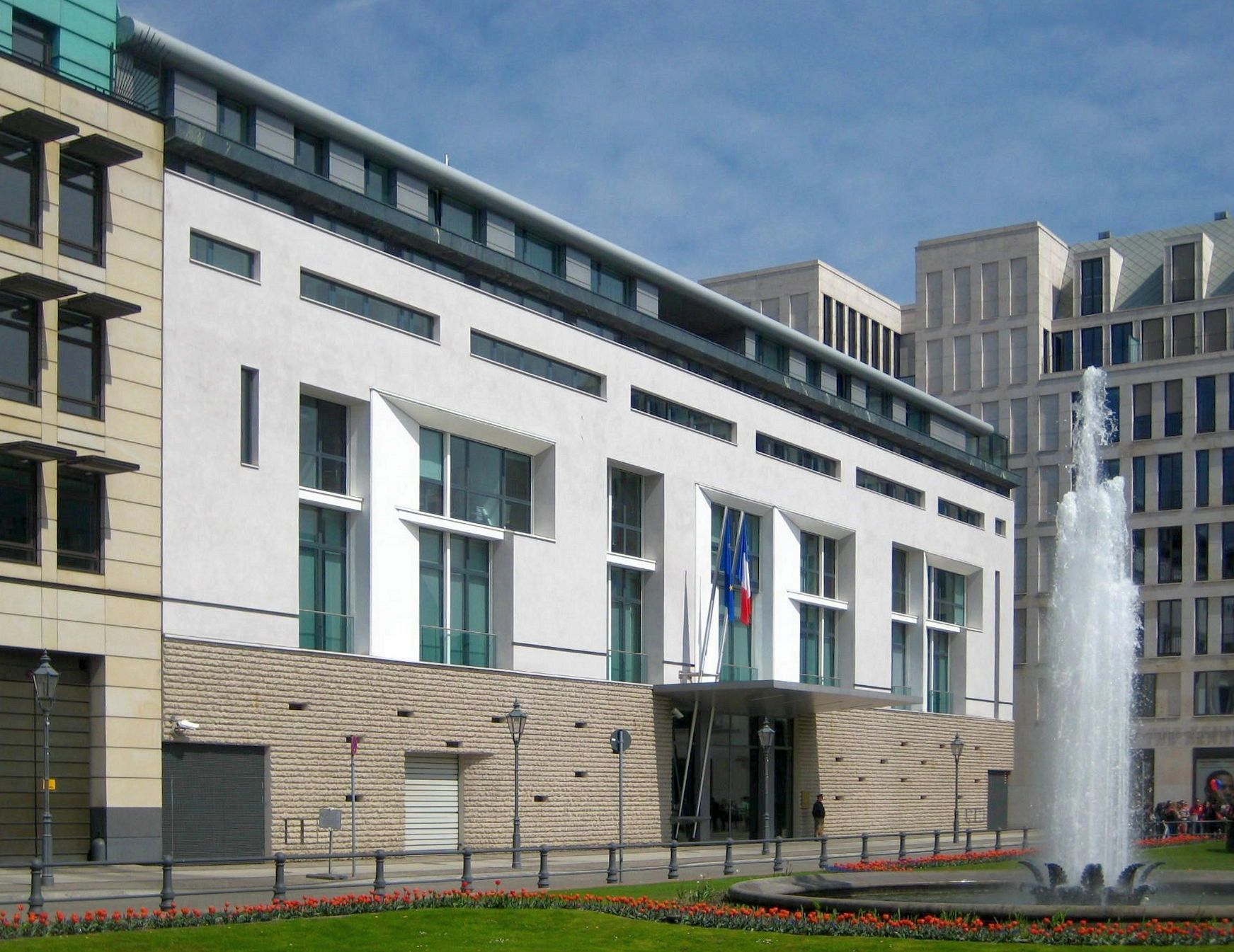
Embassy of France in Berlin

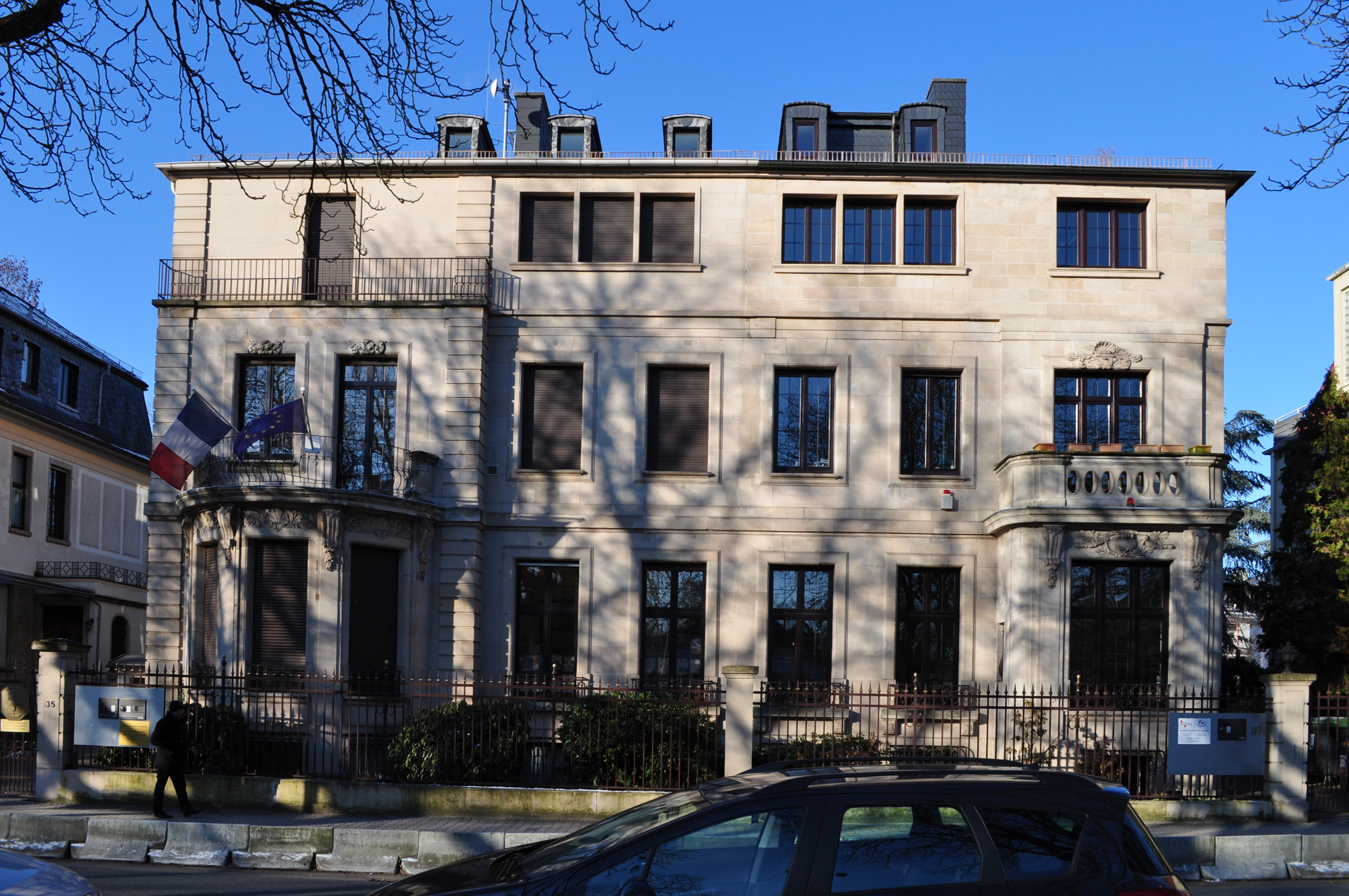
Former Consulate-General of France in Frankfurt

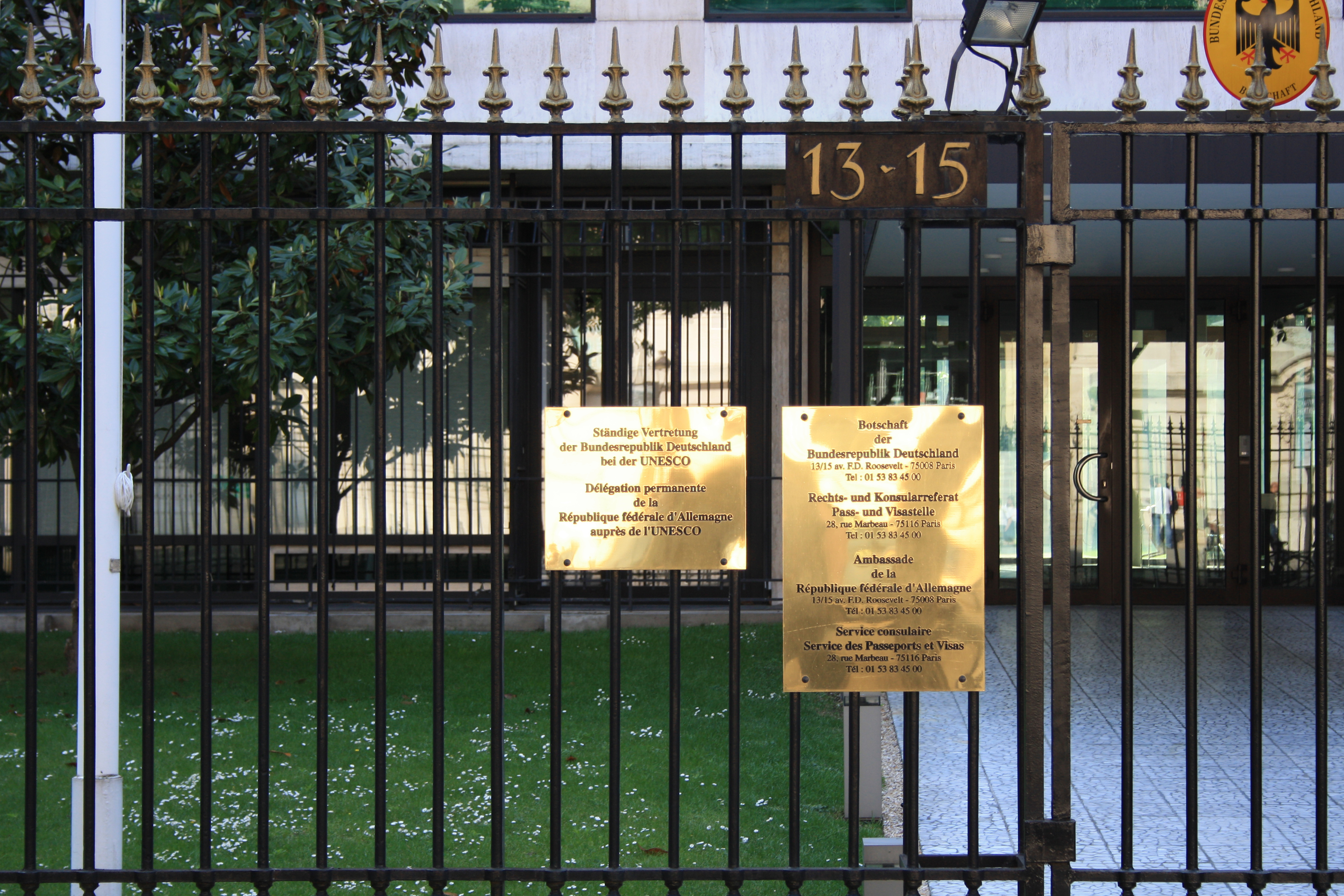
Embassy of Germany in Paris

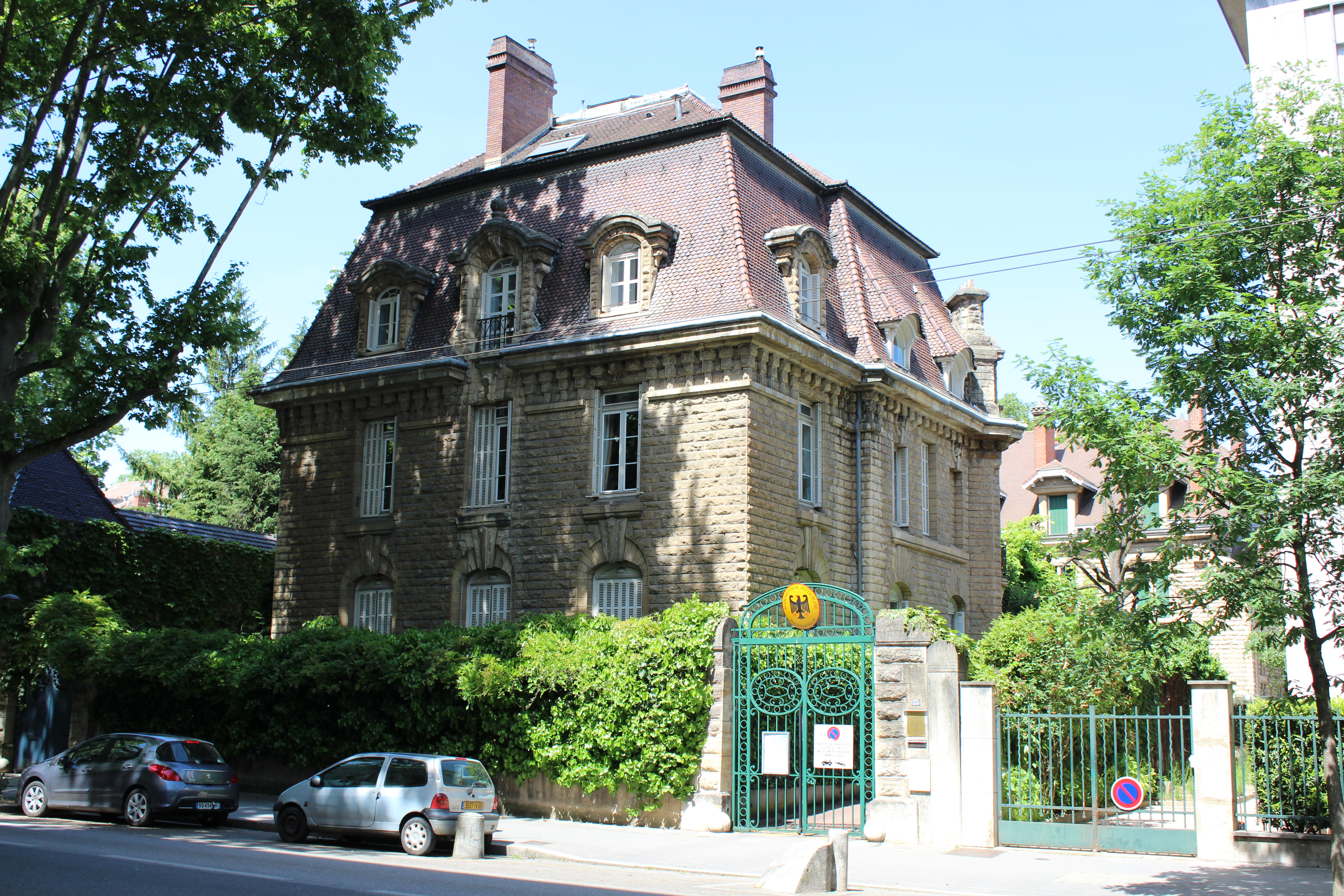
Consulate-General of Germany in Lyon

== See also ==
- Alsace
- Causes of World War II
- Foreign relations of Germany
- International relations (1814–1919)
- List of Ambassadors of France to Germany
- List of Ambassadors of Germany to France
