= Élysée Treaty =

1963 peace agreement between France and West Germany

Treaty between the French Republic and the Federal Republic of Germany on French-German Cooperation
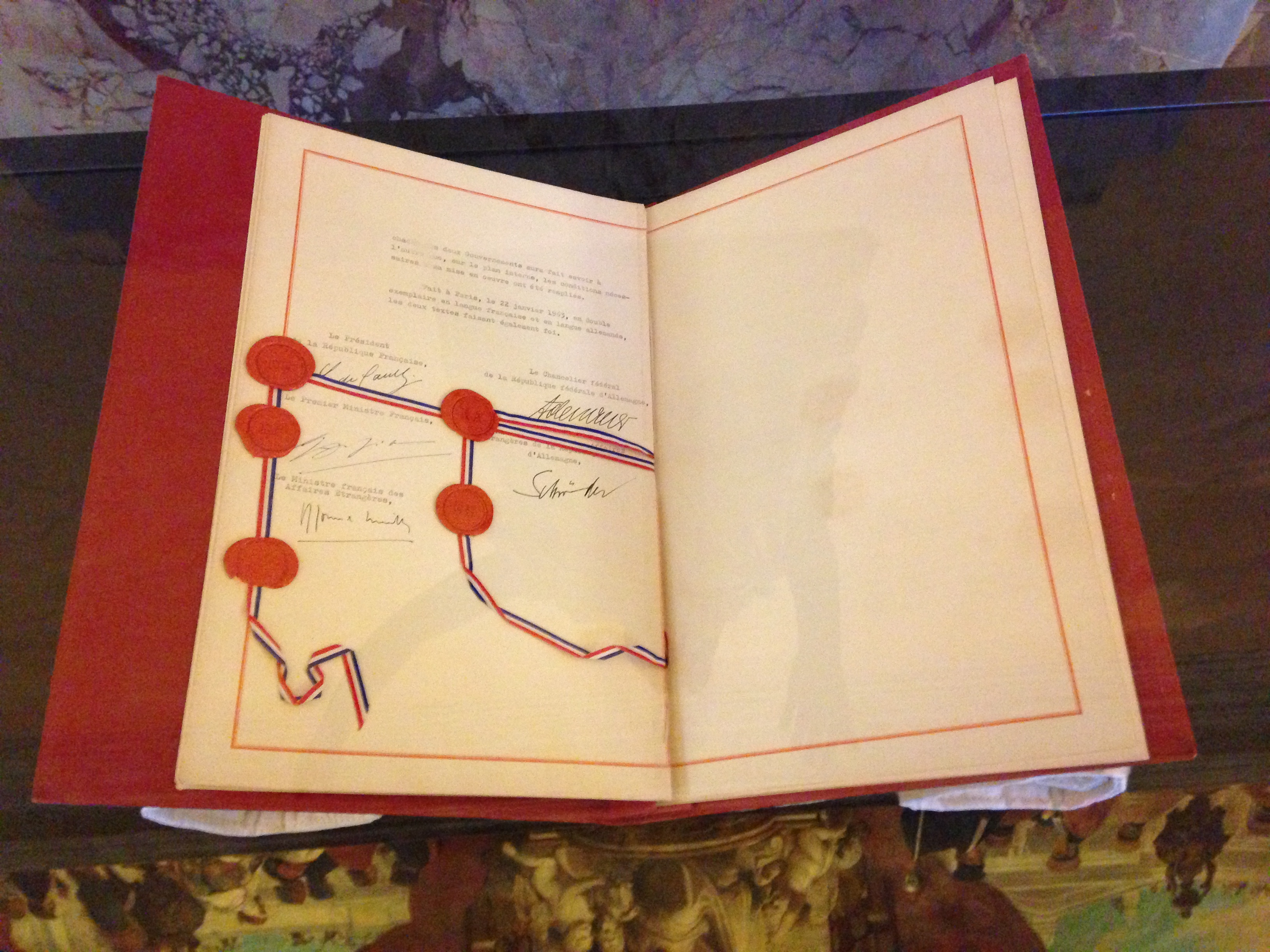
- Original treaty document with signatures
- Type: Friendship treaty
- Context: Post-war Europe; Franco-German cooperation
- Signed: 22 January 1963
- Location: Élysée Palace, Paris
- Original signatories: Charles de Gaulle; Georges Pompidou; Maurice Couve de Murville; Konrad Adenauer; Gerhard Schröder
- Parties: France; West Germany
- Languages: French; German

Full text
- Élysée Treaty at Wikisource

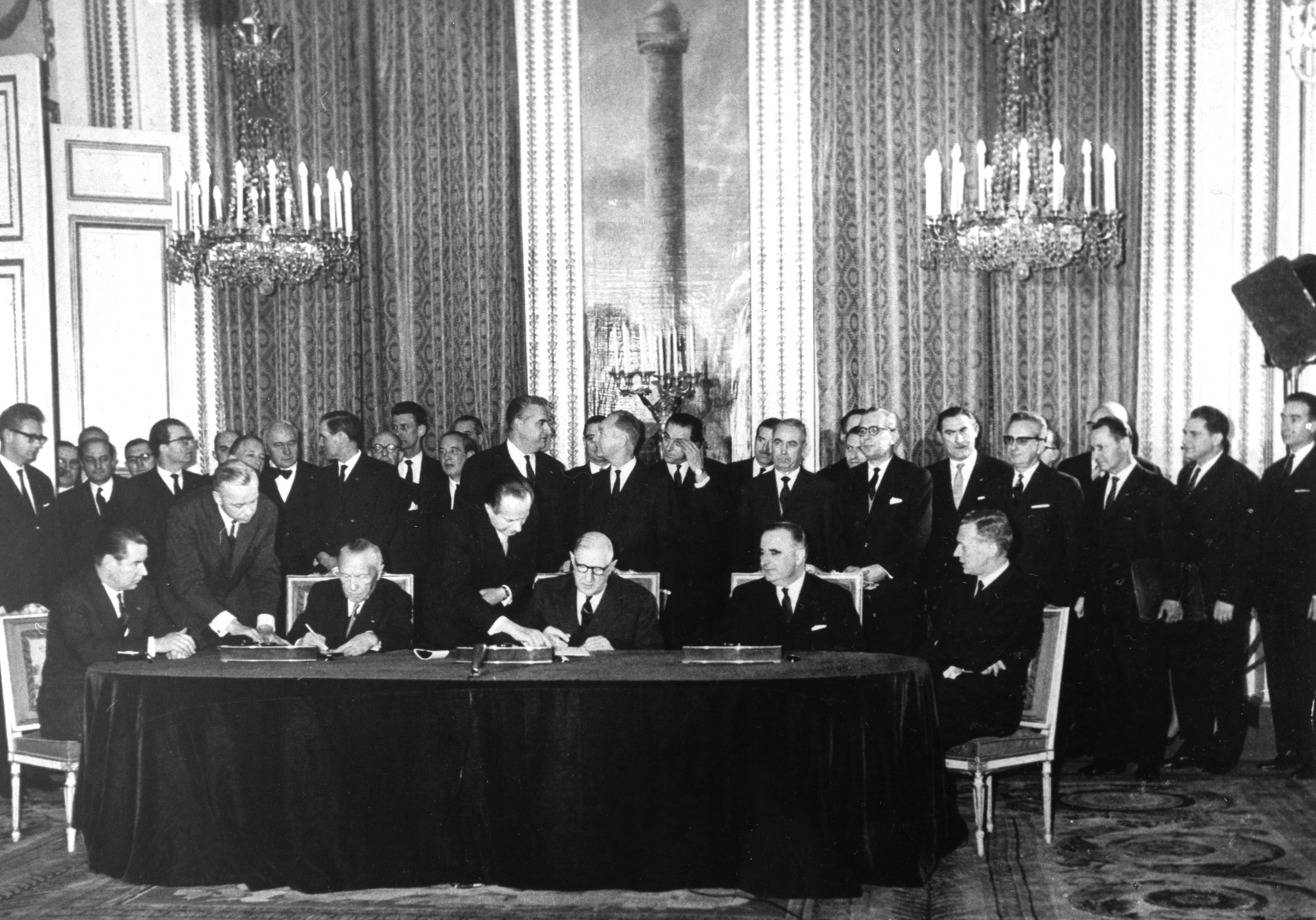
The signing of the treaty in the Salon Murat of the Élysée Palace

The Élysée Treaty was a treaty of friendship between France and West Germany, signed by President Charles de Gaulle and Chancellor Konrad Adenauer on 22 January 1963 at the Élysée Palace in Paris. With the signing of this treaty, Germany and France established a new foundation for relations, bringing an end to centuries of French–German enmity and wars.

== Background ==
Franco–German relations were long dominated by the idea of French–German enmity, which asserted that there was a natural rivalry between the two nations. Germany started World War II by invading Poland in 1939. France then declared war on Germany, which prompted the German invasion and occupation of France from 1940 to 1944. Afterwards, France participated in the Allied occupation of Germany from 1945 to 1949.

The post-war West German chancellor Konrad Adenauer made rapprochement between the historic rivals one of his priorities.

== Contents ==
The treaty called for regular consultations between France and West Germany on all important questions concerning defense, education and youth issues. It also requires regular summits between high-level officials, which implies that the Heads of State and Government have to meet at least twice a year and the Ministers of Foreign Affairs every three months, to ensure close collaboration between the two states.

The first meeting between the two heads of state took place at the private home of General de Gaulle at Colombey-les-Deux-Églises in September 1958. Since then, French and German heads of state have kept up the strong relationship, often considered as the engine of European integration.

Additionally, an interministerial commission was established to coordinate and oversee the Franco-German collaboration. It consisted of high-ranked officials of every involved ministry.

== Controversy ==
Just two months after the signing of the friendship treaty, a new controversy between France and West Germany occurred. President de Gaulle intended the treaty to make West Germany distance itself and eventually separate itself from its American protector. He saw West Germany (and the other member states of the European Economic Community) as vassalized by Washington. The treaty was notable in that it made no mention of the United States, United Kingdom, NATO, or the General Agreement on Tariffs and Trade (GATT).

However, after US President John F. Kennedy expressed his displeasure about this to the West German ambassador to the United States, the Bundestag ratified the treaty with a preamble which called on France and West Germany to pursue tight cooperation with the United States; the eventual admission of the United Kingdom to the EEC; the achievement of a free trade accord in the framework of the GATT; and for the West's military integration in NATO under US leadership. This effectively emptied the Treaty of any sense (in Gaullist understanding) and put end to General de Gaulle's hopes of building the EEC into a counterweight to the US and the USSR. "The Germans are behaving like pigs. They are putting themselves completely at the Americans' service. They're betraying the spirit of the Franco-German Treaty. And they're betraying Europe." Later, in 1965, the General told his closest aides behind closed doors: "The Germans had been my greatest hope; they are my greatest disappointment."

== Aftermath ==
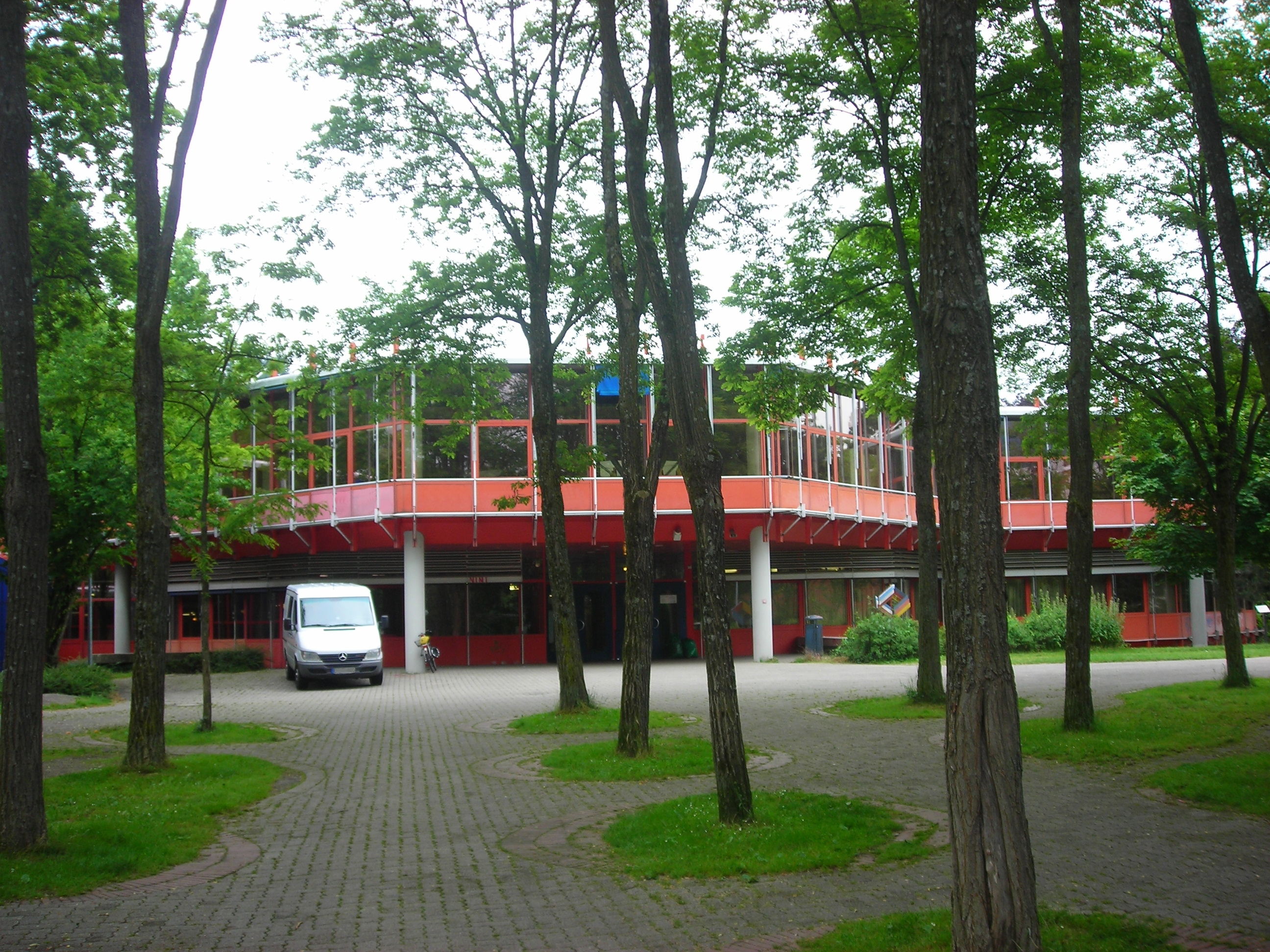
DFG-LFA Freiburg in Germany, a school that was established as result of the treaty

Among the direct consequences of the Treaty are the creation of the Franco-German Youth Office (l'Office Franco-allemande pour la jeunesse/Deutsch-Französisches Jugendwerk), the creation of Franco-German high schools, and the twinning between numerous French and German towns, schools and regions. Another outcome of the Treaty was the Franco-German military brigade, which was established in 1987 and is still intact.

In January 2003, the Assemblée Nationale and the Deutsche Bundestag met in Versailles to celebrate the 40th anniversary of the Treaty. The choice of location was high in symbolism, as the palace had been the site of humiliation for each country, in 1871 and 1919.

New forms of bilateral coordination between the two countries were created in the course of the 40th anniversary celebration, such as the Franco-German Ministerial Council, which meets twice a year. The celebration also led to the creation for the first time of a common Franco-German History Coursebook to be used in both countries and foster a shared vision of history. The Franco-German University enables students to attain international double degrees from both countries. Additionally, a so-called Élysée-Fond was established to promote Franco-German culture projects in third countries. Also, double citizenships for French and German citizens in the opposite country are now easier to obtain, or in some cases finally possible.

Chancellor Angela Merkel and President Emmanuel Macron, along with lawmakers from both countries, called for a "new Élysée Treaty" in January 2018 on the occasion of its 55th anniversary. The so-called Aachen Treaty was signed on 22 January 2019.

== See also ==
- France–Germany relations
- Schuman Declaration
- History of Europe
