= List of international trips made by Angela Merkel =

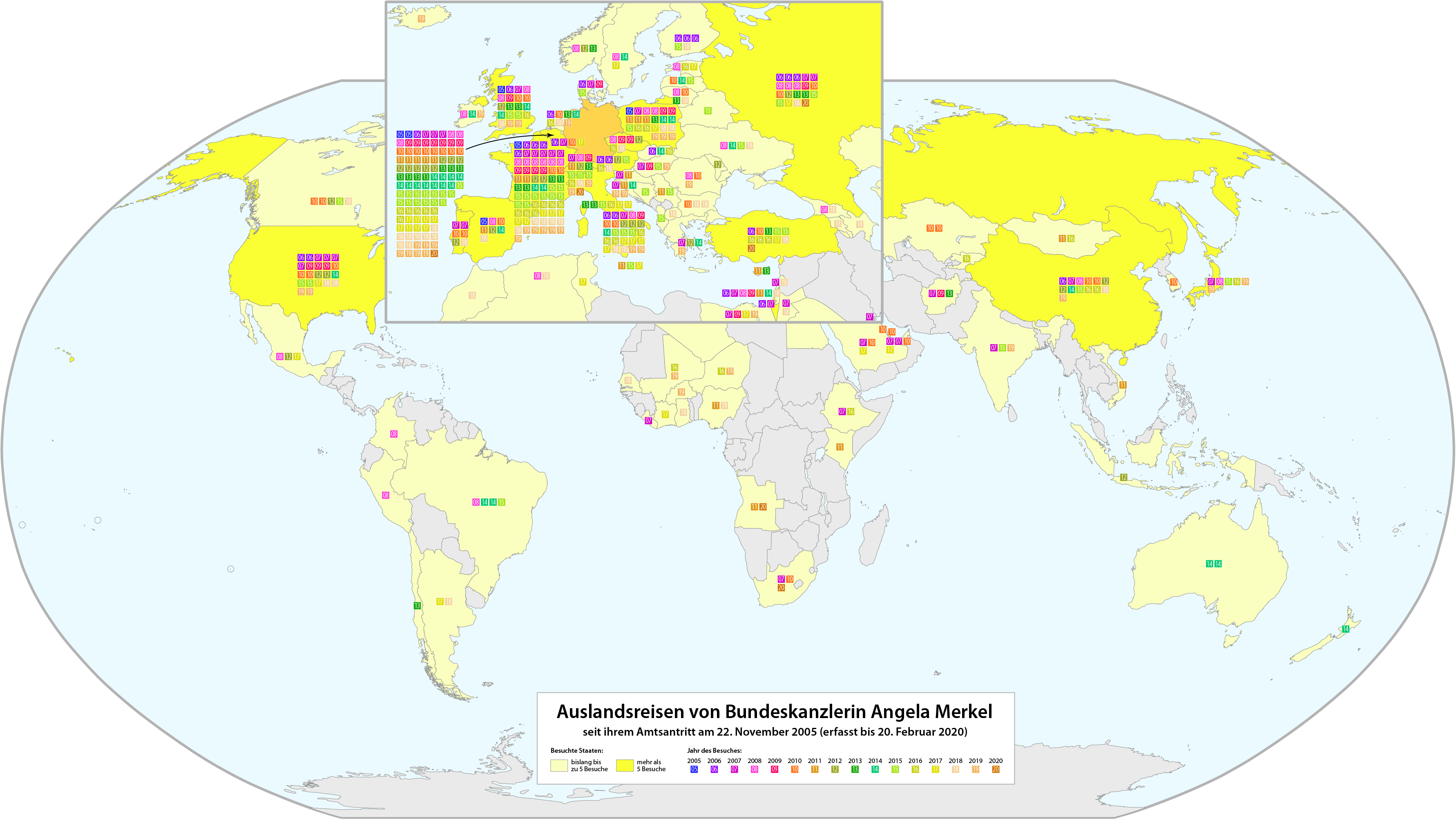
A map of all the countries Merkel visited as of February 2015.

This is the list of international trips made by Angela Merkel, who served as Chancellor of Germany from 22 November 2005 until 8 December 2021.

== Summary ==
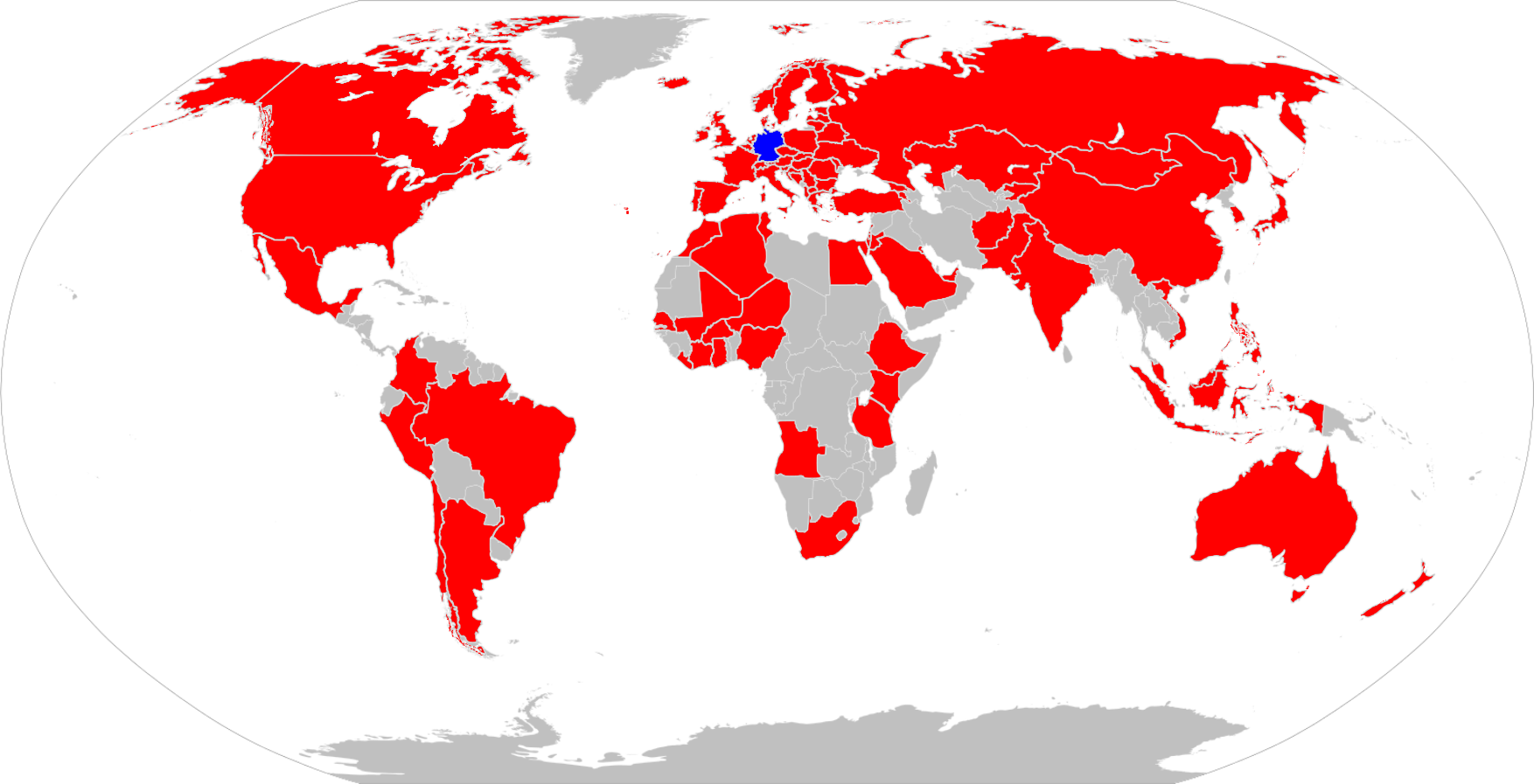
Countries visited by Angela Merkel during her chancellorship.

The number of visits per country where chancellor Angela Merkel traveled are:

- One visit to Armenia, Australia, Azerbaijan, Bahrain, Belarus, Bosnia, Burkina Faso, Chile, Colombia, Ghana, Iceland, Indonesia, Ivory Coast, Kenya, Kuwait, Kyrgyzstan, Liberia, Moldova, New Zealand, Peru, Qatar, Senegal, Singapore, South Korea, Tunisia, and Vietnam
- Two visits to Albania, Algeria, Angola, Argentina, Cyprus, Ethiopia, Georgia, Jordan, Kazakhstan, Kosovo, Lebanon, Mali, Mongolia, Morocco, Niger, Nigeria, North Macedonia, and Palestine
- Three visits to Bulgaria, Estonia, Ireland, Latvia, Malta, Mexico, Norway, Serbia, Slovenia, South Africa, and Sweden
- Four visits to Brazil, Canada, Denmark, Egypt, Hungary, India, Lithuania, Luxembourg, Romania, Saudi Arabia, Slovakia, and United Arab Emirates
- Five visits to Afghanistan, Croatia, Finland, Greece, and Portugal
- Six visits to Austria, Czech Republic, Japan, and Ukraine
- Seven visits to the Netherlands and Vatican City
- Eight visits to Israel and Spain
- Twelve visits to China
- Thirteen visits to Turkey
- Sixteen visits to Switzerland
- Twenty-one visits to Russia
- Twenty-two visits to Poland and the United Kingdom
- Twenty-four visits to the United States
- Twenty-six visits to Italy
- Seventy-five visits to France
- One-hundred and eighteen visits to Belgium

== 2005 ==
Country	Location(s)	Date	Details	Image
France	Paris	23 November	Merkel met with President Jacques Chirac. Note: First trip abroad as Chancellor of Germany.	
Belgium	Brussels	23 November	Merkel met with NATO Secretary General Jaap de Hoop Scheffer and European Commission President José Manuel Barroso.	
United Kingdom	London	24 November	Merkel met with Prime Minister Tony Blair.	
Spain	Barcelona	27 November	Merkel attended the Euromed summit.	
Poland	Warsaw	2 December	Merkel met with Prime Minister Kazimierz Marcinkiewicz.	
Belgium	Brussels	16–17 December	Merkel attended the European Council summit.	

== 2006 ==
Country	Location(s)	Date	Details	Image
Austria	Vienna	2 January	Merkel met with Chancellor Wolfgang Schüssel.	
United States	Washington, D.C.	12–13 January	Merkel met with President George W. Bush.	
Russia	Moscow	16 January	Merkel met with President Vladimir Putin.	
France	Versailles	23 January	Merkel met with President Jacques Chirac.	
Israel	Jerusalem	29 January	Merkel met with Deputy Prime Minister Ehud Olmert. Merkel visited the Yad Vashem Holocaust Memorial.	
Palestine	Ramallah	29 January	Merkel met with President Mahmoud Abbas.	
Russia	Tomsk	26 April	Merkel met with President Vladimir Putin.	
United States	New York City and Washington D.C.	4–5 May	Merkel met with President George W. Bush. Merkel delivered the speech to American and German entrepreneurs. Merkel also delivered the speech at the 100th anniversary celebration of the American Jewish Committee.	
Slovakia	Bratislava	11 May	Merkel met with Prime Minister Mikuláš Dzurinda.	
Austria	Vienna	12 May	Merkel attended the Caribbean summit.	
China	Beijing and Shanghai	22–23 May	Merkel met with Premier Wen Jiabao. Merkel visited the installations of Expo 2010.	
Russia	Saint Petersburg	15–17 July	Merkel attended the 32nd G8 summit.	
France	Paris	25 August	Merkel met with President Jacques Chirac.	
Finland	Helsinki	10–11 September	Merkel attended the ASEM summit. Merkel held bilateral meetings with Polish Prime Minister Jarosław Kaczyński, South Korean President Roh Moo-hyun, and Indonesian President Susilo Bambang Yudhoyono.	
France	Compiègne	23 September	Merkel met with President Jacques Chirac and Russian President Vladimir Putin.	
Italy	Castel Gandolfo	28 September	Private audience with Pope Benedict XVI.	
Turkey	Istanbul	6 October	Merkel met with Prime Minister Recep Tayyip Erdoğan.	
France	Paris	12 October	Merkel met with President Jacques Chirac.	
Finland	Lahti	20 October	Merkel attended the informal European Council summit.	
Netherlands	The Hague	27 October	Merkel met with Prime Minister Jan Peter Balkenende and Queen Beatrix.	
United Kingdom	London	3 November	Merkel met with Prime Minister Tony Blair.	
Luxembourg	Luxembourg City	15 November	Merkel accepted the Vision for Europe award from the Edmond Israel Foundation.	
Italy	Milan	7 December	Merkel met with Prime Minister Romano Prodi. Merkel visited La Scala.	
Belgium	Brussels	15 December	Merkel attended the European Council summit.	
Finland	Helsinki	19 December	Merkel met with Prime Minister Matti Vanhanen.	
Denmark	Copenhagen	19 December	Merkel met with Prime Minister Anders Fogh Rasmussen.	

== 2007 ==
Country	Location(s)	Date	Details	Image
United States	Washington, D.C.	5 January	Merkel met with President George W. Bush.	
Slovenia	Ljubljana	15 January	Merkel attended the anniversary celebration of the Euro.	
France	Strasbourg	17 January	Merkel delivered the speech to the European Parliament.	
Russia	Sochi	21 January	Merkel met with President Vladimir Putin.	
Switzerland	Davos	24 January	Merkel delivered the speech at the World Economic Forum.	
Egypt	Cairo	3 February	Merkel met with President Hosni Mubarak.	
Saudi Arabia	Riyadh	4 February	Merkel met with King Abdullah.	
United Arab Emirates	Abu Dhabi	5 February	Merkel met with Emir Khalifa bin Zayed Al Nahyan.	
United Arab Emirates	Dubai	6 February	Merkel met with Emir Mohammed bin Rashid Al Maktoum.	
Kuwait	Kuwait City	6 February	Merkel met with Prime Minister Nasser Al-Mohammed Al-Sabah.	
France	Strasbourg	13 February	Merkel delivered the speech to the European Parliament.	
France	Cannes	15 February	Merkel attended the France-Africa summit.	
Belgium	Brussels	6 March	Merkel attended the European Council summit to reach an agreement on climate protection. Merkel also attended the EU Social summit.	
Poland	Warsaw	16 March	Merkel met with President Lech Kaczyński. Merkel delivered the speech at the University of Warsaw.	
Italy	Rome	19 March	Merkel met with Prime Minister Romano Prodi.	
Jordan	Amman and Aqaba	31 March	Merkel met with King Abdullah II.	
Israel	Jerusalem	1 April	Merkel met with Prime Minister Ehud Olmert. Merkel received an honorary doctorate from the Hebrew University. Merkel visited the Yad Vashem Holocaust Memorial.	
Palestine	Ramallah	1 April	Merkel met with President Mahmoud Abbas to support the peace process.	
Lebanon	Beirut	2 April	Merkel met with Prime Minister Fuad Siniora. Merkel visited the frigate Brandenburg, a flagship of the German naval unit, on UNIFIL mission.	
United States	Washington, D.C.	29–30 April	Merkel attended the EU-US summit.	
Croatia	Zagreb	11 May	Merkel attended the meeting of the countries of South-East European cooperation. Merkel met with Prime Minister Ivo Sanader.	
Russia	Samara	17–18 May	Merkel attended the EU-Russia summit.	
Luxembourg	Luxembourg City	17 June	Merkel met with Prime Minister Jean-Claude Juncker.	
Belgium	Brussels	21–22 June	Merkel attended the European Council summit.	
France	Toulouse	16 July	Merkel met with President Nicolas Sarkozy.	
Greece	Athens	20 July	Merkel met with Prime Minister Kostas Karamanlis.	
Denmark	Ilulissat	17–18 August	Merkel met with Prime Minister Anders Fogh Rasmussen. Merkel visited the West Greenland coast in the context of climate change and global warming.	
Hungary	Budapest	21 August	Merkel met with Prime Minister Ferenc Gyurcsány. Merkel delivered speech at the German-speaking Andrássy University.	
United Kingdom	London	22 August	Merkel met with Prime Minister Gordon Brown.	
China	Beijing and Nanjing	26–28 August	Merkel met with President Hu Jintao and Premier Wen Jiabao. Merkel delivered the speech at the Academy of Social Sciences in Beijing. Merkel also delivered the speech at the Nanjing Law Institute.	
Japan	Tokyo, Kyoto and Osaka	29–31 August	Merkel met with Prime Minister Shinzo Abe and Emperor Akihito.	
United States	New York City	24–25 September	Merkel attended the UN Climate Change summit. Merkel delivered the speech to the United Nations General Assembly. Merkel accepted the World Statesman Award 2007 (Head of Government of the Year) from the Appeal of Conscience Foundation.	
Ethiopia	Addis Ababa	4 October	Merkel met with Prime Minister Meles Zenawi. Merkel delivered the speech to the African Union.	
South Africa	Johannesburg, Pretoria and Cape Town	5–6 October	Merkel met with President Thabo Mbeki and former President Nelson Mandela.	
Liberia	Monrovia	7 October	Merkel met with President Ellen Johnson-Sirleaf.	
India	New Delhi and Mumbai	29 October–1 November	Merkel met with Prime Minister Manmohan Singh. Merkel visited the Bank for Rural Development in Mumbai.	
Afghanistan	Kabul	3 November	Merkel met with President Hamid Karzai. Merkel visited the German ISAF soldiers.	
United States	Crawford	9–10 November	Merkel met with President George W. Bush.	
France	Paris	6 December	Merkel met with President Nicolas Sarkozy.	
Portugal	Lisbon	8 December	Merkel attended the EU-Africa summit.	
Portugal	Lisbon	13 December	Merkel attended the signing of the Treaty of Lisbon.	
Belgium	Brussels	14 December	Merkel met with the EU heads of state and government.	

== 2008 ==
Country	Location(s)	Date	Details	Image
United Kingdom	London	29 January	Merkel met with Prime Minister Gordon Brown.	
Spain	Palma	31 January	Merkel met with Prime Minister José Luis Rodríguez Zapatero.	
Russia	Moscow	8 March	Merkel met with President Vladimir Putin.	
Belgium	Brussels	14 March	Merkel attended the European Council summit.	
Israel	Jerusalem and Tel Aviv	14–16 March	Merkel attended the 60th anniversary of the founding of Israel. Merkel met with Prime Minister Ehud Olmert. Merkel delivered the speech to the Knesset.	
Romania	Bucharest	3–4 April	Merkel attended the 2008 NATO summit.	
Norway	Oslo	12 April	Merkel met with Prime Minister Jens Stoltenberg.	
Ireland	Dublin	14 April	Merkel met with Taoiseach Bertie Ahern.	
France	Strasbourg	15 April	Merkel delivered the speech to the European Parliament.	
Switzerland	Bern and Geneva	29 April	Merkel met with the President Pascal Couchepin. Merkel visited the CERN.	
Brazil	Brasília and São Paulo	13–15 May	Merkel met with President Luiz Inácio Lula da Silva. Merkel visited the VW's headquarters in São Paulo. See Latin America, the Caribbean and the European Union Summit.	
Peru	Lima	15–16 May	Merkel met with President Alan García. Merkel attended the EU-Latin America summit.	
Colombia	Bogotá	17–18 May	Merkel met with President Álvaro Uribe.	
Mexico	Mexico City	18–19 May	Merkel met with President Felipe Calderón.	
Japan	Tōyako	7–9 July	Merkel attended the 34th G8 summit.	
France	Paris	13 July	Merkel met with President Nicolas Sarkozy.	
Algeria	Algiers	17 July	Merkel met with President Abdelaziz Bouteflika.	
Ukraine	Kyiv	21 July	Merkel met with President Viktor Yushchenko and Prime Minister Yulia Tymoshenko.	
Russia	Sochi	15–16 August	Merkel met with President Dmitry Medvedev.	
Georgia	Tbilisi	17 August	Merkel met with President Mikheil Saakashvili.	
Sweden	Stockholm	25 August	Merkel met with Prime Minister Fredrik Reinfeldt.	
Estonia	Tallinn	26 August	Merkel met with President Toomas Hendrik Ilves and Prime Minister Andrus Ansip.	
Lithuania	Vilnius	26 August	Merkel met with President Valdas Adamkus and Prime Minister Gediminas Kirkilas.	
Belgium	Brussels	1 September	Merkel attended an extraordinary European Council summit.	
Poland	Wrocław	24 September	Merkel received the award of an honorary doctorate from the Wrocław University of Technology.	
Russia	Saint Petersburg	2 October	Merkel met with President Dmitry Medvedev.	
France	Paris	4 October	Merkel attended the G4 Summit with President Nicolas Sarkozy, British Prime Minister Gordon Brown, and Italian Prime Minister Silvio Berlusconi.	
France	Colombey-les-Deux-Églises	11 October	Merkel met with President Nicolas Sarkozy.	
France	Paris	12 October	Euro countries adopt a joint action plan to stabilize the financial markets.	
Belgium	Brussels	16 October		
Czech Republic	Prague	20 October	Merkel met with Prime Minister Mirek Topolánek.	
China	Beijing	23–25 October	Merkel attended the ASEM summit.	
United Kingdom	London	30 October	Merkel met with Prime Minister Gordon Brown.	
Belgium	Brussels	7 November	Merkel attended the preparatory meeting for the G20 summit.	
United States	Washington D.C.	14–15 November	Merkel attended the G20 summit.	
Italy	Trieste	18 November	Merkel met with Prime Minister Silvio Berlusconi.	
France	Paris	24 November	Merkel met with President Nicolas Sarkozy.	
Poland	Warsaw	9 December	Merkel met with Prime Minister Donald Tusk.	
Belgium	Brussels	11–12 December	Merkel attended the European Council summit.	

== 2009 ==
Country	Location(s)	Date	Details	Image
France	Paris	8 January	Merkel met with President Nicolas Sarkozy.	
Egypt	Sharm El Sheikh	18 January	Merkel held the conference to bring about a ceasefire in the Gaza Strip.	
Israel	Jerusalem	18 January	Merkel met with Prime Minister Ehud Olmert.	
Switzerland	Davos	30 January	Merkel attended the World Economic Forum.	
Belgium	Brussels	1 March	Merkel attended the EU special meeting on the economic crisis.	
Belgium	Brussels	20 March		
United Kingdom	London	1 April	Merkel attended the G20 summit.	
France	Strasbourg	4 April	Merkel attended the 2009 NATO summit.	
Czech Republic	Prague	5 April	Merkel attended the EU-US summit.	
Afghanistan	Kunduz	6 April	Merkel visited the German bases.	
Czech Republic	Prague	7 May	Merkel attended the founding summit of the EU's Eastern Partnership.	
Poland	Kraków	4 June	Merkel attended the 20th anniversary of the fall of communism.	
France	Paris	11 June	Merkel attended the preparation of the European Council summit.	
Belgium	Brussels	19 June	Merkel attended the European Council summit.	
United States	Washington, D.C.	26 June	Merkel met with President Barack Obama.	
Italy	L'Aquila	8–10 July	Merkel attended the 35th G8 summit.	
Russia	Sochi	14 August	Merkel met with President Dmitry Medvedev.	
Hungary	Sopron	19 August	Merkel attended the 20th anniversary of the opening of Hungary's border.	
Poland	Gdańsk	1 September	Merkel attended the 70th anniversary of the outbreak of the World War II.	
Belgium	Brussels	17 September	Merkel attended the informal meeting of EU heads of state and government.	
United States	Pittsburgh	24–25 September	Merkel attended the G20 summit.	
Belgium	Brussels	29–30 October	Merkel attended the European Council summit.	
United States	Washington, D.C.	2–3 November	Merkel met with President Barack Obama. Merkel addressed a joint session of the United States Congress.	
France	Paris	11 November	Merkel attended the commemoration ceremonies for the end of the World War I.	
Belgium	Brussels	19 November	Merkel met with EU heads of state and government.	
Belgium	Brussels	10–11 December	Merkel attended the European Council summit.	
Denmark	Copenhagen	17–18 December	Merkel attended the COP15 summit.	

== 2010 ==
Country	Location(s)	Date	Details	Image
France	Paris	4 February	Merkel met with President Nicolas Sarkozy. Merkel attended the 12th Franco-German Ministerial Council.	
Belgium	Brussels	11 February	Merkel attended the EU special meeting.	
Luxembourg	Luxembourg City	9 March	Merkel met with Prime Minister Jean-Claude Juncker and Grand Duke Henri.	
Netherlands	The Hague	11 March	Merkel met with Queen Beatrix and Prime Minister Jan Peter Balkenende.	
Belgium	Brussels	25–26 March	Merkel attended the European Council summit.	
Turkey	Istanbul and Ankara	29–30 March	Merkel met with Prime Minister Recep Tayyip Erdoğan and President Abdullah Gül.	
United Kingdom	Chequers and London	1 April	Merkel met with Prime Minister Gordon Brown. Merkel received the award from the King Charles II Medal of the Royal Society.	
United States	Washington D.C., San Francisco and Los Angeles	12–15 April	Merkel attended the 2010 Nuclear Security Summit.	
Portugal	Lisbon	16 April	Unexpected stopover on the return journey to Germany due to the volcanic eruption in Iceland.	
Italy	Rome and Bolzano	17 April	Continuation of the delayed return journey to Germany by plane (to Rome) and vehicles (to Bolzano) due to the volcanic eruption in Iceland.	
Italy	Bolzano	18 April	Last leg of the delayed return journey by vehicle to Germany due to the volcanic eruption in Iceland.	
Belgium	Brussels	7 May	Merkel attended the summit of the Eurozone states.	
Russia	Moscow	8–9 May	Merkel met with President Dmitry Medvedev. Merkel attended the commemoration of the 65th anniversary of the end of the World War II.	
Spain	Madrid	17 May	Merkel attended the EU-Latin America summit.	
United Arab Emirates	Abu Dhabi	24 May	Merkel toured the Masdar Eco-City.	
Saudi Arabia	Thuwal and Jeddah	25–26 May	Merkel toured the King Abdullah University of Science and Technology. Merkel met with King Abdullah.	
Qatar	Doha	26–27 May		
Bahrain	Manama	27 May	Merkel met with Prime Minister Khalifa bin Salman Al Khalifa.	
Belgium	Brussels	17 June	Merkel attended the European Council summit.	
Canada	Huntsville	25–26 June	Merkel attended the 36th G8 summit.	
Canada	Toronto	26–27 June	Merkel attended the G20 summit.	
South Africa	Cape Town	3 July	Merkel met with President Jacob Zuma. Merkel attended the football match between Germany and Argentina at the 2010 FIFA World Cup.	
Russia	Yekaterinburg	15 July	Merkel met with President Dmitry Medvedev. Merkel attended the 12th German-Russian intergovernmental consultations and the Petersburg Dialogue.	
China	Beijing and Xi'an	16–17 July	Merkel met with Premier Wen Jiabao. Merkel visited the Terracotta Army.	
Kazakhstan	Astana	18 July	Merkel met with President Nursultan Nazarbayev.	
Lithuania	Vilnius	6 September	Merkel met with President Dalia Grybauskaitė.	
Latvia	Riga	7 September	Merkel met with President Valdis Zatlers.	
Belgium	Brussels	16 September	Merkel attended the European Council summit.	
United States	New York City	20–21 September	Merkel participated in the United Nations General Assembly summit on the Millennium Development Goals.	
Belgium	Brussels	4 October	Merkel attended the ASEM summit.	
Bulgaria	Sofia	11 October	Merkel met with President Georgi Parvanov and Prime Minister Boyko Borissov. Merkel received the award of an honorary doctorate from the University of Ruse and the Bulgarian State Order Stara Planina.	
Romania	Bucharest	12 October	Merkel met with President Traian Băsescu and Prime Minister Emil Boc.	
France	Deauville	18–19 October	Merkel met with President Nicolas Sarkozy and Russian President Dmitry Medvedev.	
Belgium	Brussels	28–29 October	Merkel attended the European Council summit.	
United Kingdom	Chequers	30–31 October	Merkel met with Prime Minister David Cameron.	
South Korea	Seoul	11–12 November	Merkel attended the G20 summit.	
Belgium	Brussels and Bruges	12 November	Merkel met with King Albert II and Prime Minister Yves Leterme.	
Portugal	Lisbon	19–20 November	Merkel attended the 2010 NATO summit.	
Kazakhstan	Astana	1 December	Merkel attended the OSCE summit.	
Belgium	Brussels	16–17 December	Merkel attended the European Council summit.	
Afghanistan	Kunduz and Mazar-i-Sharif	18 December	Merkel visited the German troops. Merkel met with President Hamid Karzai.	

== 2011 ==
Country	Location(s)	Date	Details	Image
Malta	Valletta	10 January	Merkel met with President George Abela and Prime Minister Lawrence Gonzi.	
Cyprus	Nicosia	11 January	Merkel met with President Dimitris Christofias.	
Switzerland	Davos	28 January	Merkel attended the World Economic Forum.	
Israel	Jerusalem and Tel Aviv	31 January–1 February	Merkel met with President Shimon Peres and Prime Minister Benjamin Netanyahu on the occasion of the 3rd German-Israeli government consultations. Merkel received the award of an honorary doctorate from Tel Aviv University.	
Spain	Madrid	3 February	Merkel met with Prime Minister José Luis Rodríguez Zapatero and King Juan Carlos I on the occasion of the 23rd German-Spanish intergovernmental consultations.	
Belgium	Brussels	4 February	Merkel attended the European Council summit.	
Poland	Warsaw	7 February	Merkel met with President Bronisław Komorowski and French President Nicolas Sarkozy on the Weimar Triangle.	
Slovakia	Bratislava	11 February	Merkel attended the 20th anniversary of the signing of the Visegrád Agreement.	
Belgium	Brussels	11 March	Merkel attended the special meeting of the European Council summit on the situation in Libya.	
France	Paris	19 March	Merkel attended the summit on the Libyan crisis.	
Belgium	Brussels	24–25 March	Merkel attended the European Council summit.	
France	Deauville	26–27 May	Merkel attended the 37th G8 summit.	
India	New Delhi	31 May	Merkel met with Prime Minister Manmohan Singh.	
Singapore	Central Area	1 June		
United States	Washington, D.C.	7–8 June	Merkel met with President Barack Obama. Merkel received the award of the Presidential Medal of Freedom.	
Switzerland	Geneva	14 June	Merkel delivered the speech at the 100th Annual Work Conference of the International Labor Organization.	
Poland	Warsaw	21 June	Merkel participated in the German-Polish intergovernmental consultations.	
Belgium	Brussels	23–24 June	Merkel attended the European Council summit.	
Poland	Hel Peninsula	9 July	Merkel attended the informal meeting in a private atmosphere with President Bronislaw Komorowski.	
Kenya	Nairobi	12 July		
Angola	Luanda	13 July		
Nigeria	Abuja	14 July		
Belgium	Brussels	21 July	Merkel attended the European Council summit.	
France	Paris	16 August	Merkel met with President Nicolas Sarkozy.	
Croatia	Zagreb	22 August	Merkel met with Prime Minister Jadranka Kosor.	
Serbia	Belgrade	23 August	Merkel met with President Boris Tadić.	
Slovenia	Ljubljana	30 August	Merkel met with President Borut Pahor.	
France	Paris	1 September	Merkel attended the summit on the Libyan crisis.	
Poland	Warsaw	29–30 September	Merkel attended the Eastern Partnership summit.	
Belgium	Brussels	5 October		
Vietnam	Hanoi and Ho Chi Minh City	10–11 October		
Mongolia	Ulanbaatar	12–13 October		
Belgium	Brussels	23 October	Merkel attended the European Council summit.	
France	Cannes	2–3 November	Merkel attended the G20 summit.	
Belgium	Brussels	8–9 December	Merkel attended the European Council summit.	
Kosovo	Pristina	19 December	Merkel met with Prime Minister Hashim Thaçi. Merkel visited the German KFOR troops.	

== 2012 ==
Country	Location(s)	Date	Details	Image
Switzerland	Davos	25 January	Merkel attended the World Economic Forum.	
Belgium	Brussels	30 January	Merkel attended the informal European Council summit.	
China	Beijing and Guangzhou	1–2 February	Merkel met with President Hu Jintao, Chairman of the National People's Congress Wu Bangguo, and Premier Wen Jiabao.	
France	Paris	6 February	Merkel attended the 14th Franco-German Ministerial Council.	
Belgium	Brussels	1–2 March	Merkel attended the European Council summit.	
Afghanistan	Mazar-i-Sharif	12 March	Merkel visited the German troops.	
Italy	Rome	13 March	Merkel met with President Giorgio Napolitano and Prime Minister Mario Monti.	
Czech Republic	Prague	3 April	Merkel met with President Václav Klaus and Prime Minister Petr Nečas.	
United States	Camp David	18–19 May	Merkel attended the 38th G8 summit.	
United States	Chicago	20 May	Merkel attended the 2012 NATO summit.	
Belgium	Brussels	23 May	Merkel attended the informal dinners of EU heads of state and government.	
Mexico	Los Cabos	18–19 June	Merkel attended the G20 summit.	
Italy	Rome	22 June	Merkel met with Prime Minister Mario Monti, French President François Hollande, and Spanish Prime Minister Mariano Rajoy.	
France	Paris	27 June	Merkel met with President François Hollande.	
Belgium	Brussels	28–29 June	Merkel attended the European Council summit.	
Italy	Rome	4 July	Merkel participated in the German-Italian intergovernmental consultations.	
France	Reims	8 July	Merkel attended the 50th anniversary of the Mass in Reims Cathedral, which was attended by German Chancellor Konrad Adenauer and French President Charles de Gaulle. The fair is considered a symbol of the improvement of German-French relations.	
Indonesia	Jakarta	9–11 July	Merkel met with President Susilo Bambang Yudhoyono. Merkel visited the Tsunami Early Warning Centre and the Istiqlal Mosque, as well as meetings with Indonesian and German business representatives.	
Canada	Ottawa and Gatineau	15–16 August	Merkel met with Prime Minister Stephen Harper.	
Moldova	Chișinău	22 August	Merkel met with Prime Minister Vladimir Filat. Note: First visit of a German head of government to Moldova.	
China	Beijing and Tianjin	29–30 August	Merkel met with Premier Wen Jiabao and Vice President Xi Jinping.	
Spain	Madrid	6 September	Merkel met with Prime Minister Mariano Rajoy. Merkel participated in the German-Spanish business meeting.	
Austria	Vienna	7 September	Merkel met with Chancellor Werner Faymann.	
Greece	Athens	9 October	Merkel met with Prime Minister Antonis Samaras.	
Belgium	Brussels	18–19 October	Merkel attended the European Council summit.	
Belgium	Brussels	7 November	Merkel delivered the keynote speech on European policy to the European Parliament.	
United Kingdom	London	7 November	Merkel met with Prime Minister David Cameron.	
Portugal	Lisbon	12 November	Merkel met with President Aníbal Cavaco Silva and Prime Minister Pedro Passos Coelho. Merkel participated in the German-Portuguese business meeting.	
Russia	Moscow	16 November	Merkel participated in the 14th German-Russian intergovernmental consultations. Merkel delivered the speech at the Petersburg Dialogue.	
Belgium	Brussels	22–23 November	Merkel attended the special European Council summit on the EU's Multiannual Financial Framework, Merkel met with European Council President Herman Van Rompuy.	
Norway	Oslo	10 December	Merkel participated in the awarding of the Nobel Peace Prize to the European Union.	
Belgium	Brussels	13–14 December	Merkel attended the European Council summit.	

== 2013 ==
Country	Location(s)	Date	Details	Image
Cyprus	Limassol	12 January	Merkel met with Cypriot politicians.	
Switzerland	Davos	24 January	Merkel attended the World Economic Forum.	
Chile	Santiago	26–27 January	Merkel met with President Sebastián Piñera. Merkel attended the EU summit with Latin American and Caribbean countries.	
France	Paris	6 February	Merkel met with President François Hollande. Merkel attended the international football match between France and Germany at the Stade de France.	
Belgium	Brussels	7–8 February	Merkel attended the European Council summit.	
Norway	Oslo	20 February	Merkel met with Prime Minister Jens Stoltenberg.	
Turkey	Ankara, Kahramanmaraş and Göreme	24–25 February	Merkel visited the German troops as part of Operation Active Fence. Merkel met with President Abdullah Gül and Prime Minister Recep Tayyip Erdoğan.	
Poland	Warsaw	6 March	Merkel attended the meeting of the member countries of the Visegrád Group, along with French President François Hollande.	
Belgium	Brussels	14–15 March	Merkel attended the European Council summit.	
Vatican	Vatican City	19 March	Merkel attended the inauguration of Pope Francis.	
Afghanistan	Mazar-i-Sharif and Kunduz	10 May	Merkel visited the German troops.	
Vatican	Vatican City	18 May	Merkel attended the private audience with Pope Francis.	
Belgium	Brussels	22 May	Merkel attended the European Council summit. Merkel received the honor with the Lord Jakobovits of European Jewry Prize by the European Rabbinical Conference.	
Netherlands	Nijmegen	23 May	Merkel received the award of an honorary doctorate by Radboud University Nijmegen.	
United Kingdom	London	25 May	Merkel attended the Champions League final between Borussia Dortmund and FC Bayern Munich at London's Wembley Stadium.	
France	Paris	30 May	Merkel met President François Hollande.	
United Kingdom	Lough Erne	17–18 June	Merkel attended the 39th G8 summit.	
Russia	Saint Petersburg	21 June	Merkel attended the St. Petersburg International Economic Forum. Merkel met with President Vladimir Putin.	
Belgium	Brussels	28–29 June	Merkel attended the European Council summit.	
Russia	Saint Petersburg	5–6 September	Merkel attended the G20 summit.	
Belgium	Gent	19 October	Merkel attended the funeral service for former Prime Minister Wilfried Martens. Merkel met with the Prime Minister Elio Di Rupo.	
Belgium	Brussels	24–25 October	Merkel attended the European Council summit.	
France	Paris	12 November	Merkel participated in a conference on youth employment.	
Lithuania	Vilnius	28–29 November	Merkel attended the Eastern Partnership summit.	
France	Paris	18 December	Merkel met with President François Hollande.	
Belgium	Brussels	19–20 December	Merkel attended the European Council summit.	

== 2014 ==
Country	Location(s)	Date	Details	Image
France	Paris	19 February	Merkel participated in the 16th Franco-German Ministerial Council. Merkel met with President François Hollande. Merkel visited the OECD. Merkel met with OECD Secretary-General José Ángel Gurría. Merkel participated in the European Round Table of Industrialists.	
Israel	Jerusalem	24–25 February	Merkel participated in the fifth German-Israeli intergovernmental consultations. Merkel met with President Shimon Peres and Prime Minister Benjamin Netanyahu.	
United Kingdom	London	27 February	Merkel delivered the speech to both houses of the British Parliament. Merkel met with Prime Minister David Cameron and audience with Elizabeth II.	
Belgium	Brussels	6 March	Merkel attended the EU special summit on the crisis in Ukraine.	
Ireland	Dublin	7 March	Merkel met with Taoiseach with Enda Kenny.	
Poland	Warsaw	12 March	Merkel met with Prime Minister Donald Tusk.	
Belgium	Brussels	20–21 March	Merkel attended the European Council summit.	
Netherlands	The Hague	24–25 March	Merkel attended the 2014 Nuclear Security Summit.	
Belgium	Brussels	2–3 April	Merkel attended the 4th EU-Africa summit.	
Greece	Athens	11 April	Merkel met with Prime Minister Antonis Samaras.	
United States	Washington D.C.	2 May	Merkel met with President Barack Obama. Merkel delivered the speech on transatlantic economic issues and current issues of bilateral relations and foreign policy at the American Chamber of Commerce.	
Belgium	Brussels	27 May	Merkel attended the informal meeting of EU heads of state and government.	
Belgium	Brussels	4–5 June	Merkel attended the 40th G7 summit.	
France	Ouistreham and Ranville	6 June	Merkel attended the commemoration of the 70th anniversary of the landing of the Allied troops in Normandy. Merkel also attended wreath-laying ceremony at the Ranville military cemetery.	
Sweden	Flen Municipality	9–10 June	Merkel met with Prime Minister Fredrik Reinfeldt, British Prime Minister David Cameron, and Dutch Prime Minister Mark Rutte.	
Brazil	Brasília and Salvador	15–16 June	Merkel met with President Dilma Rousseff. Merkel visited the 2014 FIFA World Cup group match between Germany and Portugal.	
Belgium	Ypres and Brussels	26–27 June	Merkel attended the European Council summit.	
China	Beijing and Chengdu	6–8 July		
Brazil	Rio de Janeiro	13 July	Merkel attended the final match of the 2014 FIFA World Cup between Germany and Argentina.	
Croatia	Dubrovnik	15 July	Merkel attended the Brdo summit.	
Belgium	Brussels	16 July	Merkel attended the European Council summit.	
Latvia	Riga	18 August	Merkel met with President Andris Bērziņš and Prime Minister Laimdota Straujuma.	
Ukraine	Kyiv	23 August	Merkel met with President Petro Poroshenko and Prime Minister Arseniy Yatsenyuk.	
Spain	Santiago de Compostela	24–25 August	Merkel met with Prime Minister Mariano Rajoy.	
Belgium	Brussels	30 August	Merkel attended an extraordinary European Council summit.	
United Kingdom	Newport	4–5 September	Merkel attended the 2014 NATO summit.	
Italy	Milan	16–17 October	Merkel attended the ASEM summit.	
Slovakia	Bratislava	20 October	Merkel met with Andrej Kiska and Robert Fico. Merkel received an honorary doctorates from Comenius University.	
Belgium	Brussels	23–24 October	Merkel attended the European Council summit.	
Belgium	Ypres and Nieuwpoort	28 October	Merkel attended the central commemoration of the Kingdom of Belgium on the 100th anniversary of the First Battle of Ypres.	
New Zealand	Auckland and Motutapu Island	13–14 November	Merkel met with Prime Minister John Key. Merkel visited a project to raise endangered kiwifruit.	
Australia	Brisbane and Sydney	15–17 November	Merkel attended the G20 summit. Merkel met with Prime Minister Tony Abbott.	
Poland	Krzyżowa	20 November	Merkel attended the celebrations of the 25th anniversary of the Mass of Reconciliation.	
Belgium	Brussels	18–19 December	Merkel attended the European Council summit.	

== 2015 ==
Country	Location(s)	Date	Details	Image
United Kingdom	London	7 January	Merkel met with Prime Minister David Cameron. Merkel visited the British Museum.	
France	Paris	11 January	Merkel participated in the solidarity march for the victims of the attack on Charlie Hebdo.	
Switzerland	Davos	22 January	Merkel attended the World Economic Forum.	
Italy	Florence	22–23 January	Merkel met with Prime Minister Matteo Renzi. Merkel also met with representatives of German companies in Italy.	
France	Strasbourg	30 January	Merkel met with President François Hollande and the European Parliament President Martin Schulz.	
Hungary	Budapest	2 February	Merkel met with President János Áder and Prime Minister Viktor Orbán.	
Ukraine	Kyiv	5 February	Merkel met with President Petro Poroshenko and French President François Hollande.	
Russia	Moscow	6 February	Merkel met with President Vladimir Putin and French President François Hollande.	
United States	Washington D.C.	8–9 February	Merkel met with President Barack Obama. Merkel also met with World Bank President Jim Yong Kim.	
Canada	Ottawa	9–10 February	Merkel met with Prime Minister Stephen Harper.	
Belarus	Minsk	11–12 February	Merkel attended the summit for a peaceful solution to the war in Ukraine. Merkel met with President Alexander Lukashenko, French President François Hollande, Russian President Vladimir Putin, and Ukrainian President Petro Poroshenko.	
Belgium	Brussels	12 February	Merkel attended the informal European Council summit.	
France	Paris	20 February	Merkel met with President François Hollande.	
Italy	Rome	20–21 February		
Vatican	Vatican City	20 February	Merkel met with high-ranking representatives from the Church and science. Merkel attended the audience with Pope Francis. Merkel also met with Cardinal Secretary of State Pietro Parolin.	
Belgium	Brussels	4 March	Merkel visited the European Commission. Merkel met with European Commission President Jean-Claude Juncker. Merkel also met with King Philippe at Schloss Laken.	
Japan	Tokyo and Kawasaki	9–10 March	Merkel met with Emperor Akihito and Prime Minister Shinzō Abe. Merkel visited a German company.	
Belgium	Brussels	19–20 March	Merkel attended the European Council summit.	
France	Seyne	25 March	Merkel visited the crash site of Germanwings flight 9525, along with President François Hollande and Spanish Prime Minister Mariano Rajoy.	
Finland	Helsinki	30 March	Merkel met with President Sauli Niinistö and Prime Minister Alexander Stubb.	
Belgium	Brussels	23 April	Merkel attended the EU special summit on Refugee Policy.	
Poland	Warsaw	27 April	Merkel participated in the German-Polish intergovernmental consultations.	
Denmark	Copenhagen	28 April	Merkel met with Queen Margrethe II and Prime Minister Helle Thorning-Schmidt.	
Russia	Moscow	10 May	Merkel attended the wreath-laying ceremony at the Tomb of the Unknown Soldier. Merkel met with President Vladimir Putin.	
Switzerland	Geneva	18 May	Merkel attended in the WHO World Health Assembly. Merkel met with the Director-General of the World Health Organization Margaret Chan.	
Latvia	Riga	20–21 May	Merkel attended the 4th Eastern Partnership summit.	
Belgium	Brussels	10–11 June	Merkel attended the 8th EU-Latin America summit.	
Belgium	Brussels	22 June	Merkel attended the special summit of eurozone heads of state and government on the Greek debt crisis.	
Belgium	Brussels	25–26 June	Merkel attended the European Council summit.	
France	Paris	6 July	Merkel met with President François Hollande to assess the situation following the Greek referendum.	
Belgium	Brussels	7 July	Merkel attended the special summit of the heads of state and government of the euro area on the Greek debt crisis and the Greek referendum.	
Albania	Tirana	8 July	Merkel met with President Bujar Nishani and Prime Minister Edi Rama.	
Serbia	Belgrade	8 July	Merkel met with President Tomislav Nikolić and Prime Minister Aleksandar Vučić.	
Bosnia	Sarajevo	9 July	Merkel met with Prime Minister Denis Zvizdić.	
Belgium	Brussels	12 July	Merkel attended the special summit of eurozone heads of state and government on the Greek sovereign debt crisis. Merkel also attended the extraordinary European Council.	
Italy	Milan	17 August	Merkel visited the Expo 2015, along with Prime Minister Matteo Renzi.	
Brazil	Brasília	19–20 August	Merkel participated in the 1st German-Brazilian Government Consultations. Merkel met with President Dilma Rousseff.	
Austria	Vienna	27 August	Merkel met with Werner Faymann and President Heinz Fischer. Merkel received the award of the Grand Decoration of Honour in Gold on Ribbon for Services to the Republic of Austria. Merkel attended the celebrations for the 60th anniversary of the German Chamber of Commerce in Austria. Merkel attended the Western Balkans Summit.	
Switzerland	Bern	3 September	Merkel met with President Simonetta Sommaruga. Merkel received the award of an honorary doctorate from the University of Bern.	
Belgium	Brussels	23 September	Merkel attended an informal European Council summit on the refugee crisis in Europe.	
United States	New York City	24–27 September	Merkel attended the United Nations summit.	
France	Paris	2 October	Merkel met with President François Hollande, Russian President Vladimir Putin, and Ukrainian President Petro Poroshenko to discuss the situation in Ukraine.	
India	New Delhi and Bangalore	4–6 October	Merkel participated in the German-Indian government consultations. Merkel met with Prime Minister Narendra Modi.	
France	Strasbourg	7 October	Merkel met with President François Hollande and European Parliament President Martin Schulz. Merkel participated in the plenary session of the European Parliament.	
United Kingdom	Chequers	9 October	Merkel met with Prime Minister David Cameron.	
Belgium	Brussels	15–16 October	Merkel attended the European Council summit.	
Turkey	Istanbul	18 October	Merkel met with President Recep Tayyip Erdoğan and Prime Minister Ahmet Davutoğlu.	
Belgium	Brussels	25 October	Merkel attended a meeting of EU heads of government on the refugee crisis in Europe.	
France	Paris	27 October	Merkel participated in the European Round Table.	
China	Beijing and Hefei	28–30 October	Merkel met with President Xi Jinping and Premier Li Keqiang.	
Malta	Valletta	11–12 November	Merkel attended the 5th EU-Africa summit. Merkel also attended an informal meeting of EU leaders on the refugee crisis in Europe.	
Turkey	Antalya	15–16 November	Merkel attended the G20 summit.	
France	Paris	25 November	Merkel met with President François Hollande to discuss the follow-up to the attacks in Paris.	
Belgium	Brussels	29 November	Merkel attended the EU-Turkey summit to discuss solutions to the refugee crisis in Europe.	
France	Paris	30 November	Merkel attended the COP21 summit.	
Belgium	Brussels	17–18 December	Merkel attended the European Council summit.	

== 2016 ==
Country	Location(s)	Date	Details	Image
United Kingdom	London	4 February	Merkel participated in the donor conference for Syria and the surrounding region "Supporting Syria and the Region". Merkel co-hosted the event, along with Prime Minister David Cameron, Norwegian Prime Minister Erna Solberg, Kuwaiti Emir Al-Sabah, and UN Secretary-General Ban Ki-moon.	
France	Strasbourg	7 February	Merkel met with President François Hollande and European Parliament President Martin Schulz.	
Turkey	Ankara	8 February	Merkel met with Prime Minister Ahmet Davutoğlu.	
Belgium	Brussels	18–19 February	Merkel attended the European Council summit.	
France	Paris	4 March	Merkel met with President François Hollande.	
Belgium	Brussels	7 March	Merkel attended the meeting of EU leaders with Turkey to discuss the implementation of the Action Plan to reduce illegal arrivals from Turkey to the EU.	
Belgium	Brussels	17–18 March	Merkel attended the European Council summit.	
France	Metz	7 April	Merkel participated in the 18th Franco-German Ministerial Council. Merkel met with President François Hollande.	
Netherlands	Middelburg and Eindhoven	21 April	Merkel participated in the 2nd German-Dutch intergovernmental consultations. Merkel met with the Dutch royal couple Willem-Alexander and Máxima and Princess Beatrix. Merkel met with the Prime Minister Mark Rutte.	
Turkey	Gaziantep	23 April	Merkel travelled to Turkey with European Council President Donald Tusk and the European Commission First Vice President Frans Timmermans.	
Italy	Rome	5 May	Merkel met with Prime Minister Matteo Renzi.	
Vatican	Vatican City	6 May	Merkel participated in the presentation of the Charlemagne Prize to Pope Francis.	
Turkey	Istanbul	22–23 May	Merkel participated in the World Humanitarian Summit. Merkel met with President Recep Tayyip Erdoğan.	
Japan	Shima	26–27 May	Merkel attended the 42nd G7 summit.	
France	Verdun	29 May	Merkel attended the commemoration of the 100th anniversary of the Battle of Verdun together with President François Hollande.	
Switzerland	Schattdorf and Pollegio	1 June	Merkel participated in the opening of the Gotthard Base Tunnel.	
China	Beijing and Shenyang	12–14 June	Merkel participated in the 4th Sino-German Intergovernmental Consultations.	
Belgium	Brussels	28–29 June	Merkel attended the European Council summit with a focus on the UK's decision to leave the EU.	
France	Paris	4 July	Merkel attended the Western Balkans Summit.	
Poland	Warsaw	8–9 July	Merkel attended the 2016 NATO summit.	
Kyrgyzstan	Bishkek	13–14 July	Merkel met with President Almazbek Atambayev.	
Mongolia	Ulanbaatar	15–16 July	Merkel attended the ASEM summit.	
Italy	Ventotene	22 August	Merkel met with Prime Minister Matteo Renzi and French President François Hollande.	
Estonia	Tallinn	24–25 August	Merkel met with Prime Minister Taavi Rõivas and President Toomas Hendrik Ilves. Merkel visited the NATO's Centre of Excellence.	
Czech Republic	Prague	25 August	Merkel met with Prime Minister Bohuslav Sobotka and President Miloš Zeman. Merkel visited the Technical University of Prague.	
Poland	Warsaw	26 August	Merkel attended the Visegrád Group meeting. Merkel met with Prime Minister Beata Szydło.	
Italy	Maranello	31 August	Merkel met with Prime Minister Matteo Renzi.	
France	Évian-les-Bains	2 September	Merkel participated in a panel discussion at the 25th German-French business meeting. Merkel met with President François Hollande.	
China	Hangzhou	4–5 September	Merkel attended the G20 summit.	
France	Paris	15 September	Merkel met with President François Hollande in preparation for the meeting in Bratislava the following day.	
Slovakia	Bratislava	16 September	Merkel attended an informal meeting of the remaining EU leaders on the future of the European Union.	
Austria	Vienna	24 September	Merkel attended the Western Balkans meeting.	
Mali	Bamako	9 October	Merkel met with President Ibrahim Boubacar Keïta.	
Niger	Niamey	10 October	Merkel met with President Mahamadou Issoufou. Merkel also met with German MINUSMA soldiers.	
Ethiopia	Addis Ababa	11 October	Merkel met with President Hailemariam Desalegn and African Union Commission Chairperson Nkosazana Dlamini-Zuma.	
Belgium	Brussels	20–21 October	Merkel attended the European Council summit.	
Belgium	Brussels	15 December	Merkel attended the European Council summit.	

== 2017 ==
Country	Location(s)	Date	Details	Image
Luxembourg	Luxembourg City	12 January	Merkel met with Prime Minister Xavier Bettel and Grand Duke Henri.	
Belgium	Brussels	12 January	Merkel received the award of a joint honorary doctorate from the University of Ghent and the Catholic University of Leuven. Merkel met with King Philippe and Prime Minister Charles Michel.	
Sweden	Stockholm	31 January	Merkel met with Swedish royal couple Carl XVI Gustaf and Silvia and Prime Minister Stefan Löfven.	
Turkey	Ankara	2 February	Merkel met with President Recep Tayyip Erdoğan and Prime Minister Binali Yıldırım.	
Malta	Valletta	2–3 February	Merkel attended the informal meeting of EU leaders on migration and the future of the EU after Brexit.	
Poland	Warsaw	7 February	Merkel met with Prime Minister Beata Szydło and President Andrzej Duda. Merkel also met with the PiS party leader Jarosław Kaczyński, the Civic Platform party leader Grzegorz Schetyna, and the PSL party leader Władysław Kosiniak-Kamysz.	
Egypt	Cairo	2 March	Merkel met with President Abdel Fattah el-Sisi and Prime Minister Sherif Ismail. Merkel also met with the Pope and Coptic Patriarch of Alexandria Tawadros II in St. Mark's Cathedral and with the Grand Sheikh Ahmed el-Tayeb.	
Tunisia	Tunis	3 March	Merkel met with President Beji Caid Essebsi and Prime Minister Youssef Chahed.	
France	Versailles	6 March	Merkel met with President François Hollande, Italian Prime Minister Paolo Gentiloni, and Spanish Prime Minister Mariano Rajoy.	
Belgium	Brussels	9–10 March	Merkel attended the European Council summit and an informal meeting in preparation for the 60th anniversary of the signing of the Treaties of Rome.	
United States	Washington D.C.	17 March	Merkel met with President Donald Trump.	
Vatican	Vatican City	24 March	Merkel attended the private audience with Pope Francis.	
Italy	Rome	24–25 March	Merkel attended the celebrations of the 60th anniversary of the signing of the Treaties of Rome.	
Belgium	Brussels	29 April	Merkel attended the special European Council summit with the remaining 27 EU heads of state and government to define the guidelines for the Brexit negotiations.	
Saudi Arabia	Jeddah	30 April	Merkel met with King Salman, Crown Prince Muhammad bin Nayef, and Deputy Crown Prince Mohammed ibn Salman.	
United Arab Emirates	Abu Dhabi	1 May	Merkel met with Crown Prince Mohamed bin Zayed Al Nahyan.	
Russia	Sochi	2 May	Merkel met with President Vladimir Putin.	
Belgium	Brussels	25 May	Merkel attended the 2017 NATO summit.	
Italy	Taormina	26–27 May	Merkel attended the 43rd G7 summit.	
Argentina	Buenos Aires	8 June	Merkel met with President Mauricio Macri.	
Mexico	Mexico City	9–10 June	Merkel met with President Enrique Peña Nieto.	
Italy	Rome	16–17 June		
Vatican	Vatican City	16 June	Merkel attended the private audience with Pope Francis.	
Belgium	Brussels	22–23 June	Merkel attended the European Council summit.	
France	Strasbourg	1 July	Merkel participated in a European act of mourning for the deceased former German Chancellor Helmut Kohl.	
Italy	Trieste	12 July	Merkel attended the Western Balkans Summit.	
France	Paris	13 July	Merkel met with President Emmanuel Macron. Merkel participated in the 19th Franco-German Ministerial Council.	
France	Paris	28 August	Merkel met with President Emmanuel Macron, Italian Prime Minister Paolo Gentiloni, Spanish Prime Minister Mariano Rajoy, EU High Representative for Foreign Affairs and Security Policy Federica Mogherini, Chadian President Idriss Déby, Nigerien President Mahamadou Issoufou, and Libyan Presidential Council President Fayez al-Sarraj.	
Estonia	Tallinn	29 September	Merkel attended the EU Digital Summit of EU heads of state and government.	
Belgium	Brussels	19–20 October	Merkel attended the European Council summit.	
Belgium	Brussels	24 November	Merkel attended the 5th Eastern Partnership summit.	
Ivory Coast	Abidjan	29 November	Merkel attended the summit of the European and African Union.	
France	Paris	13 December	Merkel attended the G5 Sahel conference.	

== 2018 ==
Country	Location(s)	Date	Details	Image
France	Paris	19 January	Merkel met with President Emmanuel Macron.	
Bulgaria	Sofia	20 January	Merkel met with Prime Minister Boyko Borissov.	
Switzerland	Davos	24 January	Merkel attended the World Economic Forum.	
Belgium	Brussels	22–23 February	Merkel attended the European Council summit and the EU-Sahel conference.	
France	Paris	16 March	Merkel met with President Emmanuel Macron.	
Poland	Warsaw	19 March	Merkel met with Prime Minister Mateusz Morawiecki and President Andrzej Duda.	
Belgium	Brussels	22–23 March	Merkel attended the European Council summit.	
United States	Washington, D.C.	27 April	Merkel met with President Donald Trump.	
Italy	Assisi	12 May	Merkel presented the Franciscan Peace Prize "Lamp of Peace". Merkel met with Colombian President Juan Manuel Santos.	
Bulgaria	Sofia	16–17 May	Merkel attended an informal meeting of EU heads of state or government. Merkel also attended an informal meeting of the European Union with the third countries of the Western Balkans.	
Russia	Sochi	18 May	Merkel met with President Vladimir Putin.	
China	Beijing and Shenzhen	23–25 May	Merkel met with President Xi Jinping and Premier Li Keqiang.	
Portugal	Braga, Porto and Lisbon	30–31 May	Merkel met with President Marcelo Rebelo de Sousa and Prime Minister António Costa. Merkel visited the Bosch's development and technology center in Braga. Merkel visited the University of Porto.	
Italy	Eppan	3 June	Merkel visited the training camp of the German national football team in the run-up to the 2018 FIFA World Cup.	
Canada	La Malbaie	8–9 June	Merkel attended the 44th G7 summit.	
Jordan	Amman	21 June	Merkel met with King Abdullah II. Merkel also met with Bundeswehr soldiers stationed in Jordan.	
Lebanon	Beirut	22 June	Merkel met with Prime Minister Saad Hariri, President Michel Aoun, and Speaker of Parliament Nabih Berri. Merkel attended a double-shift school, where Lebanese children are taught in the morning and Syrian refugee children in the afternoon.	
Belgium	Brussels	24 June	Merkel attended the informal EU migration meeting.	
Belgium	Brussels	28–29 June	Merkel attended the European Council summit.	
United Kingdom	London	10 July	Merkel attended the Western Balkans Summit.	
Belgium	Brussels	11–12 July	Merkel attended the 2018 NATO summit.	
Spain	Almonte	11–12 August	Merkel met with Prime Minister Pedro Sánchez at his holiday home in the Coto de Doñana National Park.	
Georgia (country)	Tbilisi and Odzisi	23 August	Merkel met with President Giorgi Margvelashvili and Prime Minister Mamuka Bakhtadze. Merkel visited the Georgian border with South Ossetia.	
Armenia	Yerevan	24 August	Merkel met with President Armen Sarkissian and Prime Minister Nikol Pashinyan. Merkel attended the wreath-laying ceremony at the Tsitsernakaberd Memorial.	
Azerbaijan	Baku	25 August	Merkel met with President Ilham Aliyev.	
Senegal	Dakar	29 August	Merkel met with President Macky Sall.	
Ghana	Accra	30 August	Merkel met with President Nana Akufo-Addo.	
Nigeria	Abuja	31 August	Merkel met with President Muhammadu Buhari.	
France	Marseille	7 September	Merkel met with President Emmanuel Macron.	
North Macedonia	Skopje	8 September	Merkel met with Prime Minister Zoran Zaev.	
Lithuania	Vilnius and Rukla	14 September	Merkel met with President Dalia Grybauskaitė, Prime Minister Saulius Skvernelis, Latvian Prime Minister Māris Kučinskis, and Estonian Prime Minister Jüri Ratas. Merkel visited the NATO Battlegroup Lithuania.	
Algeria	Algiers	17 September	Merkel met with President Abd al-Aziz Bouteflika and Prime Minister Ahmed Ouyahia.	
Austria	Salzburg	19–20 September	Merkel attended an informal meeting of the heads of state and government of the European Union.	
Israel	Jerusalem	3–4 October	Merkel participated in the 7th German-Israeli intergovernmental consultations. Merkel met with Prime Minister Benjamin Netanyahu and President Reuven Rivlin. Merkel received an honorary doctorate from the University of Haifa.	
Netherlands	The Hague	10 October	Merkel met with Prime Minister Mark Rutte.	
Belgium	Brussels	17–19 October	Merkel attended the European Council summit, the Euro summit, and the ASEM summit	
Czech Republic	Prague	26 October	Merkel met with Prime Minister Andrej Babiš.	
Turkey	Istanbul	27 October	Merkel met with President Recep Tayyip Erdoğan, French President Emmanuel Macron, and Russian President Vladimir Putin for the summit on Syria .	
Ukraine	Kyiv	1 November	Merkel met with President Petro Poroshenko and Prime Minister Volodymyr Groysman.	
Poland	Warsaw	2 November	Merkel participated in the 15th German-Polish intergovernmental consultations. Merkel met with Prime Minister Mateusz Morawiecki.	
Finland	Helsinki	7 November	Merkel met with Prime Minister Juha Sipilä.	
France	Paris and Compiègne	10–11 November	Merkel attended a commemorative event in the clearing of Compiègne with President Emmanuel Macron. Merkel visited the Musée d'Orsay as well as participation in an international commemoration ceremony at the Arc de Triomph.	
France	Strasbourg	13 November	Merkel delivered the speech to the European Parliament.	
Belgium	Brussels	25 November	Merkel attended the European Council summit.	
Argentina	Buenos Aires	30 November–1 December	Merkel attended the G20 summit.	
United States	Washington, D.C.	5 December	Merkel attended the state funeral of former President George H. W. Bush.	
Morocco	Marrakesh	9–10 December	Merkel participated in the conference for the adoption of the Global Compact for Safe, Orderly and Regular Migration. Merkel met with King Mohammed VI and Prime Minister Saadeddine Othmani.	
Belgium	Brussels	13–14 December	Merkel attended the European Council summit.	

== 2019 ==
Country	Location(s)	Date	Details	Image
Greece	Athens	10–11 January	Merkel met with President Prokopis Pavlopoulos and Prime Minister Alexis Tsipras.	
Switzerland	Davos	23–24 January	Merkel attended the World Economic Forum.	
Japan	Tokyo	3–5 February	Merkel met with Prime Minister Shinzo Abe and Emperor Akihito.	
Egypt	Sharm el-Sheikh	24–25 February	Merkel attended the summit of the European Union and the Arab League.	
France	Paris	27 February	Merkel met with President Emmanuel Macron.	
Belgium	Brussels	21–22 March	Merkel attended the European Council summit.	
France	Paris	26 March	Merkel met with President Emmanuel Macron, Chinese President Xi Jinping, and European Commission President Jean-Claude Juncker. See 2019 state visits by Xi Jinping to Italy and France.	
Italy	Assisi	29 March	Merkel participated in the presentation of the Franciscan Peace Prize "Lamp of Peace" to the Jordanian King Abdullah II. Merkel met with the Prime Minister Giuseppe Conte.	
Ireland	Dublin	4 April	Merkel met with Taoiseach Leo Varadkar.	
Belgium	Brussels	10 April	Merkel attended the special European Council summit.	
Burkina Faso	Ouagadougou	1 May	Merkel met with President Roch Marc Christian Kaboré. Merkel also met with the presidents of the G5 Sahel member states and representatives of civil society.	
Mali	Gao	2 May	Merkel met with the German soldiers of the MINUSMA mission.	
Niger	Niamey	3 May	Merkel met with President Mahamadou Issoufou. Merkel also met with representatives of civil society and visit to the construction site of a women's shelter.	
Romania	Sibiu	9 May	Merkel attended the informal European Council summit.	
Croatia	Zagreb	18 May	Merkel met with Prime Minister Andrej Plenković.	
Belgium	Brussels	28 May	Merkel attended an informal dinner of the heads of state and government of the European Union.	
United States	Cambridge and Boston	30 May	Merkel attended the Harvard University's graduation ceremony. Merkel received an honorary doctorate from the university, Merkel also met with Massachusetts Governor Charlie Baker.	
United Kingdom	Portsmouth	5 June	Merkel attended the commemoration of the 75th anniversary of the landing of the Allied troops in Normandy.	
Switzerland	Geneva	11 June	Merkel participated in the 108th International Labour Conference of the International Labour Organization.	
Belgium	Brussels	20–21 June	Merkel attended the European Council summit and a Euro summit.	
Japan	Osaka	27–28 June	Merkel attended the G20 summit.	
Belgium	Brussels	30 June–2 July	Merkel attended the special EU summit to fill the top positions in the European Union.	
Poland	Poznań	5 July	Merkel attended the Western Balkans Summit.	
France	Paris	14 July	Merkel attended the Bastille Day military parade.	
Hungary	Sopron	19 August	Merkel attended the 30th anniversary of the opening of the Hungarian border. Merkel met with Prime Minister Viktor Orbán.	
Iceland	Reykjavík and Þingvellir	19–20 August	Merkel met with Prime Minister Katrín Jakobsdóttir. Merkel toured a geothermal power plant. Merkel met with the heads of government of the Nordic Council.	
Netherlands	The Hague	22 August	Merkel participated in the meeting of the German-Dutch Climate Cabinet. Merkel met with Prime Minister Mark Rutte.	
France	Biarritz	24–26 August	Merkel attended the 45th G7 summit.	
Poland	Warsaw	1 September	Merkel attended the central commemoration of the 80th anniversary of the beginning of the World War II.	
China	Beijing	5–7 September	Merkel met with President Xi Jinping and Premier Li Keqiang. Merkel visited the various companies. Merkel spoke at the Huachung University.	
United States	New York	22–24 September	Merkel attended the UN Climate Change Summit and the UN General Assembly.	
France	Paris	30 September	Merkel attended the state funeral of former President Jacques Chirac.	
France	Paris	13 October	Merkel met with President Emmanuel Macron.	
France	Toulouse	16 October	Merkel participated in the Franco-German Ministerial Council.	
Belgium	Brussels	17–18 October	Merkel attended the European Council summit.	
India	New Delhi	31 October–2 November	Merkel participated in the German-Indian government consultations. Merkel met with Prime Minister Narendra Modi. Merkel signed an agreement on the modernisation of India's mass transit system.	
Italy	Rome	11 November	Merkel met with Prime Minister Giuseppe Conte.	
Croatia	Zagreb	20 November	Merkel met with Prime Minister Andrej Plenković.	
United Kingdom	London and Watford	3–4 December	Merkel attended the 2019 NATO summit. Merkel held bilateral meetings with Prime Minister Boris Johnson, Turkish President Recep Tayyip Erdoğan, and U.S. President Donald Trump.	
Poland	Oświęcim	6 December	Merkel visited the Auschwitz-Birkenau Memorial.	
France	Paris	9 December	Met with President Emmanuel Macron, Russian President Vladimir Putin and Ukrainian President Volodymyr Zelenskyy.	
Belgium	Brussels	12–13 December	Merkel attended the European Council summit.	

== 2020 ==
Country	Location(s)	Date	Details	Image
Russia	Moscow	11 January	Merkel met with President Vladimir Putin.	
Switzerland	Davos	23 January	Merkel attended the World Economic Forum.	
Turkey	Istanbul	24 January	Merkel met with President Recep Tayyip Erdoğan.	
South Africa	Pretoria	5–6 February	Merkel met with President Cyril Ramaphosa.	
Angola	Luanda	7 February	Merkel met with President João Lourenço.	
Belgium	Brussels	20 February	Merkel attended the special European Council summit.	
Belgium	Brussels	8 July	Merkel delivered the speech to the European Parliament. Note: First trip abroad since the outbreak of the COVID-19 pandemic.	
Belgium	Brussels	17–21 July	Merkel attended the special European Council summit.	
France	Bormes-les-Mimosas	20 August	Merkel met with President Emmanuel Macron.	
Belgium	Brussels	1–2 October	Merkel attended the special European Council summit.	
Belgium	Brussels	15–16 October	Merkel attended the European Council summit.	
Belgium	Brussels	10–11 December	Merkel attended the European Council summit.	

== 2021 ==
Country	Location(s)	Date	Details	Image
Belgium	Brussels	24–25 May	Merkel attended the special European Council summit.	
United Kingdom	Carbis Bay	11–13 June	Merkel attended the 47th G7 summit.	
Belgium	Brussels	14 June	Merkel attended the 2021 NATO summit.	
Belgium	Brussels	24–25 June	Merkel attended the European Council summit.	
United Kingdom	Ellesborough and Windsor	2 July	Merkel met with Prime Minister Boris Johnson and audience with Queen Elizabeth II.	
United States	Washington, D.C. and Baltimore	15 July	Merkel met with President Joe Biden. Merkel honored Biden with an honorary doctorate from Johns Hopkins University.	
Russia	Moscow	20 August	Merkel met with President Vladimir Putin.	
Ukraine	Kyiv	21 August	Merkel met with President Volodymyr Zelenskyy.	
Poland	Warsaw	11 September	Merkel met with Prime Minister Mateusz Morawiecki.	
Serbia	Belgrade	13 September	Merkel met with President Aleksandar Vučić.	
Albania	Tirana	14 September	Merkel met with Prime Minister Edi Rama.	
France	Paris	16 September	Merkel met with President Emmanuel Macron.	
Slovenia	Predoslje	5–6 October	Merkel attended the informal European Council summit and the EU-Western Balkan Summit.	
Italy	Rome	7 October	Merkel met with Prime Minister Mario Draghi.	
Vatican City	Vatican City	7 October	Merkel attended the audience with Pope Francis.	
Israel	Jerusalem, Yad Vashem	9–11 October	Merkel met with Prime Minister Naftali Bennett, President Isaac Herzog, and Foreign Minister Yair Lapid. Merkel received the honorary doctorate of the Haifa Technion. Merkel visited the Yad Vashem Memorial.	
Spain	Cuacos de Yuste	14 October	Merkel presented the Charles V Europe Prize by King Felipe VI at the Monastery of Yuste. Merkel met with Prime Minister Pedro Sánchez.	
Belgium	Brussels	15 October	Merkel met with King Philippe and Prime Minister Alexander De Croo.	
Turkey	Istanbul	16 October	Merkel met with President Recep Tayyip Erdoğan.	
Belgium	Brussels	21–22 October	Merkel attended the European Council summit.	
Greece	Athens	28–29 October	Merkel met with President Katerina Sakellaropoulou and Prime Minister Kyriakos Mitsotakis.	
Italy	Rome	30–31 October	Merkel attended the G20 summit.	
United Kingdom	Glasgow	1 November	Merkel attended the COP26 summit.	
France	Beaune	2 November	Merkel met President Emmanuel Macron.	
France	Paris	12 November	Merkel met with President Emmanuel Macron. Merkel took over the co-chairmanship of the Libya Conference. Note: Last trip abroad as Chancellor of Germany.	

== Multilateral meetings ==
Angela Merkel participated in the following summits during her chancellorship:

Group	Year															
Group	2006	2007	2008	2009	2010	2011	2012	2013	2014	2015	2016	2017	2018	2019	2020	2021
UNGA	September (United States) New York City	September (United States) New York City	September (United States) New York City	September (United States) New York City	September (United States) New York City	September (United States) New York City	September (United States) New York City	September (United States) New York City	September (United States) New York City	September (United States) New York City	September (United States) New York City	September (United States) New York City	September (United States) New York City	September (United States) New York City	September (United States) New York City	September (United States) New York City
NATO	28–29 November (Latvia) Riga	none	2–4 April (Romania) Bucharest	3–4 April (France) Strasbourg (Germany) Kehl	19–20 November (Portugal) Lisbon	none	20–21 May (United States) Chicago	none	4–5 September (United Kingdom) Newport	none	8–9 July (Poland) Warsaw	25 May (Belgium) Brussels	11–12 July (Belgium) Brussels	3–4 December (United Kingdom) Watford	none	14 June (Belgium) Brussels
NSS	none	none	none	none	12–13 April (United States) Washington, D.C.	none	26–27 March (South Korea) Seoul	none	24–25 March (Netherlands) The Hague	none	31 March – 1 April (United States) Washington, D.C.	none	none	none	none	none
G8/G7	15–17 July, (Russia) Saint Petersburg	6–8 June, (Germany) Heiligendamm	7–9 July (Japan) Tōyako	8–10 July, (Italy) L'Aquila	25–26 June (Canada) Huntsville	26–27 May (France) Deauville	18–19 May (United States) Camp David	17–18 June (United Kingdom) Enniskillen	4–5 June (Belgium) Brussels	7–8 June (Germany) Krün	26–27 May (Japan) Shima	26–27 May (Italy) Taormina	8–9 June (Canada) La Malbaie	24–26 August; France Biarritz	10–12 June (cancelled) (United States) Camp David	11–13 June (United Kingdom) Carbis Bay
G20	Didn't exist		14–15 November, (United States) Washington, D.C.	2 April (United Kingdom) London	26–27 June (Canada) Toronto	3–4 November; Cannes	18–19 June (Mexico) Los Cabos	5–6 September (Russia) Saint Petersburg	15–16 November (Australia) Brisbane	15–16 November (Turkey) Antalya	4–5 September (China) Hangzhou	7–8 July (Germany) Hamburg	30 November – 1 December (Argentina) Buenos Aires	28–29 June (Japan) Osaka	21–22 November (videoconference) (Saudi Arabia) Riyadh	30–31 October (Italy) Rome
G20	Didn't exist		14–15 November, (United States) Washington, D.C.	24–25 September (United States) Pittsburgh	11–12 November (South Korea) Seoul	3–4 November; Cannes	18–19 June (Mexico) Los Cabos	5–6 September (Russia) Saint Petersburg	15–16 November (Australia) Brisbane	15–16 November (Turkey) Antalya	4–5 September (China) Hangzhou	7–8 July (Germany) Hamburg	30 November – 1 December (Argentina) Buenos Aires	28–29 June (Japan) Osaka	21–22 November (videoconference) (Saudi Arabia) Riyadh	30–31 October (Italy) Rome
Normandy Format	Didn't exist								6 June (France); Normandy	11–12 February (Belarus); Minsk	19 October (Germany); Berlin	none	none	9 December (France); Paris	none	none
Normandy Format	Didn't exist								16–17 October (Italy); Milan	2 October (France); Paris	19 October (Germany); Berlin	none	none	9 December (France); Paris	none	none
Berlin Process	Didn't exist									27 August (Austria) Vienna	4 July (France) Paris	12 July (Italy) Trieste	9–10 July (United Kingdom) London	4–5 July (Poland) Poznań		
██ = Did not attend/participate.

== See also ==
- List of international trips made by Olaf Scholz, her successor
