= Yuste (surname) =

Spanish surname of Basque origin

Yuste or Iuste is a Spanish surname of Basque origin.

There are about 16,645 people registered with the surname Yuste in Spain, about 8,276 who have it as their first surname, 8,369 who have it as their second, and 189 who have it in both positions. The provinces with the most people named Yuste are Madrid (22.47%), Valencia (12.01%), Barcelona (10.78%), Murcia (5.92%), Málaga (4.57%), Cádiz (3.84%) and Ávila (3.56%).

References to Yuste as a place refer to the village now called Cuacos de Yuste in Extremadura, Spain, where the Monastery of Yuste, where Charles V, Holy Roman Emperor retired and died, is situated. The village recently took the byname Yuste because of the monastery's fame. The monastery, in turn, would have taken its name from a nearby stream called Vercelejo, which was also called Yuste. It is unknown whether the stream's name is related to the surname.

== History ==
The surname, originating in the Basque language, may be from Navarre, La Rioja, or Guipuzcoa. Historian Jaime de Querexeta believes that it originated in the Kingdom of Navarre, while Julio de Atienza believes it possibly comes from the northern Rioja area when it was Basque-speaking, or from Gipuzkoa. According to Roberto Faure, the surname would derive from "Juste", which in turn would come from the patronymic "Justo". It later spread throughout the rest of the Iberian Peninsula. Francisco Zazo de Ulloa points out that the original ancestral seat of the Yuste family was in Gipuzkoa. The surname first spread throughout Castile and with the advance of the Reconquista moved south, also becoming established in Andalusia. Julio de Atienza indicates that some knights with the surname Yuste—whose lineage is unknown—may have taken part in the conquest of Jerez de la Frontera and may have settled there founding an ancestral house. In the nearby town of Arcos de la Frontera a Yuste family, or even two, also possessed an ancestral house, since two coats of arms from that city are known, Yuste and Yuste de la Torre.

"King Don Sancho the Brave was in this city, and tradition relates that he stopped in Calle Cadenas, a house that was the ancestral home of the Yuste; and that in memory of his stay some heavy iron chains were placed over the lintel of the door of that house, which is today owned by the Señores Moreno Llamas."

— Apuntes para una historia de Arcos de la Frontera.

The surname Yuste also appears to have been established in the Crown of Aragon; according to some authors, a lineage may have been founded in the settlement of Arbesa or Artesa, which may correspond to the now-abandoned village of Pardina de Larbesa or to Artieda respectively, and there is evidence that people with this surname lived there from 1626. According to Endika de Mogrobejo, another Yuste from Aruej was an Aragonese knight in the General Cortes of the Kingdom of Aragon held in 1626. However the genealogist Manuel Trujillo Berges states that this is actually an error caused by a "misreading of the surname Yeste". The existence of this surname is also documented in the Canary Islands. Many cities in South America were populated by settlers from the Canaries, and it is very likely that from there some Yustes went to the Americas already in the 16th century.

Indeed, a soldier is known who was probably the first Yuste in the Americas, although his origin is unknown. His name was Juan Yuste and he participated in the conquest of the Aztec Empire alongside Hernán Cortés. He was one of the soldiers of Pánfilo de Narváez, those sent by the governor of the island of Juana (Cuba) to arrest Cortés and who eventually joined him. It is known from the chronicler Bernal Díaz del Castillo that he was a hidalgo; however he could not carry the surname further into the Americas, as he was killed by the Mexica before he could form a family.

"It was found written in charcoal on the marble of a house where they held them prisoner: Here was imprisoned the unfortunate Juan Yuste with many others whom he brought in my company; this Juan Yuste was one of the hidalgos on horseback who were killed there, and one of the persons of quality whom Narváez had brought."

— Historia verdadera de la conquista de la Nueva España.

Some Yustes proved their nobility before the Chamber of Hidalgos of the Royal Chancery of Valladolid, as attested by the suits of nobility in the archives of that court. Likewise before the Royal Chancery of Granada two of them did so in 1532 and 1538, and also to hold office before the Holy Office of the Inquisition of Toledo. Throughout the 17th century, some Yustes from towns in Ávila sought the post of familiares, and in 1703 one of them, from a village in Córdoba, did so for notary. Two infanzones with the surname Yuste also appear integrated into the Real Compañía de Guardias Marinas in the 18th century in which they had to prove their nobility to enter, the first in 1711 and the second in 1783.

== Related noble titles ==
- Count of Yuste: Granted by King Philip IV to Ambrosio de Medina, Basta y Carranza, who was a knight of the Order of Santiago.

== Coats of arms ==
Coat of arms of one of the Yuste lineages. This coat corresponds to the only blazon described in Julio de Atienza's work, Nobiliario Español: diccionario heráldico de apellidos españoles y de títulos nobiliarios ("Spanish Nobilary: Heraldic Dictionary of Spanish Surnames and Noble Titles"). It is therefore often used on websites about heraldry or genealogy, or as merchandising, to associate this coat with the surname Yuste. Linking a surname to a single coat of arms is one of the most widespread genealogical myths.

A surname may have several noble lineages; however one may be the oldest and from it others may arise, or parallel lineages with the same surname may arise, as often happens with patronymic surnames such as González (from Gonzalo) or Núñez (from Nuño). It is possible that all Yuste lineages descend from a very ancient single lineage, but this is currently unknown. Each lineage of this surname possesses a coat of arms or blazon. These are the blazons of the various lineages:

- Or, a bend gules engouled by dragons vert.
- Lineage of Jerez de la Frontera: added to the previous shield a bordure azure with eight stars or.
- Manuel Vidal Salvador documents this blazon: Azure, a castle or, with two lions rampant or supporting the castle. Bordure azure with eight eight-pointed stars or.
- The chronicler Gracia Dei documents another: Gules, three crowns or.
- The arms of Leonejildo de Yuste, conqueror of Cuenca, added to the previous blazon because he was present at the siege of the castle of Garci Muñoz: Gules, a castle argent, above the gate a severed hand dripping blood, with a legend reading "Por la fe" ("For the faith") between the gate and the hand. Bordure azure with three crowns or.
- Argent, a fess gules.
- Azure, a palace or surmounted by an eagle sable.
- Gules, a pair of wings argent.
- Argent, a cross gules throughout. Bordure gules with four escallops argent.
- Argent, a fess gules.
- Lineage of "Arbesa": Or, two bends chequy argent and sable.
- Lineage of the Yuste de la Torre (Arcos de la Frontera): Argent, five bends gules.
- Another lineage of Arcos de la Frontera: Azure, five (or four) bars or (or argent).
- Yuste Decillán: Argent, an oak vert with a ladder leaning against its trunk.
- Yuste-Dóriga: Or, an oak vert with two wolves passant at the base of the trunk in pale.
- Yuste de Vianos: Or, a mill wheel azure. Chief argent with a fess gules.
- Gules, a fleur-de-lis or.

== People with the surname ==
- Antonio Pérez Yuste, a Spanish engineer
- Carmelo Yuste Yuste, a Spanish football player
- Daniel Yuste, a Spanish cyclist
- Héctor Yuste, a Spanish football player
- Rafael Yuste, a Spanish neuroscientist

== See also ==
- Monastery of Yuste

== Bibliography ==
- De Cadenas y Vicent, Vicente (1985). Repertorio de Blasones de la Comunidad Hispánica [Repertory of blazons of the Hispanic community]. Madrid: Instituto Salazar y Castro. ISBN 84-00-05912-3.
- Chaparro D`Acosta, Lino (1980). Heráldica de los apellidos canarios [Heraldry of Canarian surnames]. ISBN 978-84-300-2000-3.
- De Atienza y Navajas, Julio (1954). Nobiliario Español: diccionario heráldico de apellidos españoles y de títulos nobiliarios [Spanish nobiliary: heraldic dictionary of Spanish surnames and noble titles]. M. Aguilar.
- de Mogrobejo, Endika (1998). Diccionario hispanoamericano de heráldica, onomástica y genealogía [Hispano-American dictionary of heraldry, onomastics and genealogy]. Vol. XIII. Bilbao: Mogrobejo-Zabala. ISBN 84-89965-05-6.
- Do Río Martínez, Bizén (1998). Diccionario de Heráldica Aragonesa [Dictionary of Aragonese heraldry]. ISBN 9788483210116.
- Platero Fernández, Carlos (1992). Los apellidos en Canarias [Surnames in the Canary Islands]. ISBN 84-604-8184-2.
