= Antonio Pérez =

Antonio Pérez may refer to:

- Antonio Pérez (statesman) (1540–1611), Spanish statesman, secretary of king Philip II of Spain
- Antonio Pérez (1599–1649), Spanish Jesuit and philosopher
- Antonio Pérez (baseball) (born 1980), retired Major League Baseball player
- Antonio Pérez (swimmer) (born 1944), Spanish Olympic swimmer
- Antonio Pérez (volleyball) (born 1956), Cuban volleyball player
- Antonio M. Pérez (born 1947), businessman from Spain, CEO of Eastman Kodak Company
- Antonio Pérez Yuste (born 1968), professor of telecommunications engineering
- Antonio Pérez (footballer), Mexican footballer
- Antonio Pérez (educator) (born 1946), New York City educator
- Antonio Pérez (bishop) (1562–1637), Roman Catholic prelate
- Antonio Pérez (racing driver) (born 1986), Mexican racing driver
- Tony Perez (playwright), Filipino playwright and visual artist
