= List of international trips made by Friedrich Merz =

This is the list of international trips made by Friedrich Merz, who is currently serving as Chancellor of Germany since 6 May 2025.

== Summary ==
The number of visits per country where chancellor Friedrich Merz traveled are:

- One visit to Albania, Angola, Brazil, Canada, China, Croatia, Cyprus, Egypt, India, Ireland, Israel, Japan, Jordan, Lithuania, Moldova, the Netherlands, Norway, Qatar, Saudi Arabia, Singapore, South Africa, South Korea, Spain, Sweden, Switzerland, United Arab Emirates, and Vatican City
- Two visits to Denmark, Finland, Montenegro, Poland, Turkey, and Ukraine
- Three visits to Italy and the United States
- Four visits to the United Kingdom,
- Seven visits to France
- Ten visits to Belgium

== 2025 ==
Country	Location(s)	Date	Details	Image
France	Paris	7 May	Merz met with President Emmanuel Macron. Note: First trip abroad as Chancellor of Germany.	
Poland	Warsaw	7 May	Merz met with Prime Minister Donald Tusk, emphasizing relations within the Weimar Triangle.	
Belgium	Brussels	9 May	Merz met with European Commission President Ursula von der Leyen. In NATO headquarters, Merz met with Secretary General Mark Rutte for bilateral talks, and to discuss preparation of the NATO Summit in The Hague.	
Ukraine	Kyiv	10 May	Merz travelled to Kyiv with French President Emmanuel Macron, British Prime Minister Keir Starmer, and Polish Prime Minister Donald Tusk to meet President Volodymyr Zelenskyy and display European unity in support of Ukraine.	
Albania	Tirana	16 May	Merz attended the 6th European Political Community Summit.	
Italy	Rome	17 May	Merz met with Prime Minister Giorgia Meloni.	
Vatican City	Vatican City	18 May	Merz attended the inauguration mass and met with Pope Leo XIV.	
Lithuania	Vilnius	22 May	Merz inaugurated a German brigade aimed at strengthening NATO's presence and deterring Russian threats in the Baltic region.	
Finland	Turku and Kultaranta	26–27 May	Merz attended the Nordic summit. Merz met with President Alexander Stubb and Prime Minister Petteri Orpo.	
United States	Washington, D.C.	5 June	Merz met with President Donald Trump.	
Canada	Kananaskis	15–17 June	Merz attended the 51st G7 summit.	
Netherlands	The Hague	24–25 June	Merz attended the 2025 NATO summit.	
Belgium	Brussels	26–27 June	Merz attended the European Council summit.	
Italy	Rome	10 July	Merz attended the Ukraine Recovery Conference.	
United Kingdom	London	17 July	Merz met with Prime Minister Keir Starmer. Merz signed a friendship treaty between Great Britain and Germany (Kensington Treaty)	
United States	Washington, D.C.	18 August	Merz attended the White House multilateral meeting on Ukraine, in which he held peace talks with US President Donald Trump, Ukrainian President Volodymyr Zelenskyy, and other European leaders following the Trump–Putin Alaska Summit.	
Moldova	Chișinău	27 August	Merz met with President Maia Sandu along with French President Emmanuel Macron and Polish Prime Minister Donald Tusk.	
France	Toulon	28–29 August	Merz participated in the Franco-German Ministerial Council.	
France	Évian-les-Bains	4 September	Merz met with President Emmanuel Macron.	
Spain	Madrid	18 September	Merz met with Prime Minister Pedro Sanchez.	
Denmark	Copenhagen	1–2 October	Merz attended the informal meeting of EU heads of state and government. Merz attended the 7th European Political Community Summit.	
Egypt	Sharm El Sheikh	13 October	Merz attended the Sharm El Sheikh summit which included the signing of the Gaza peace plan to end the Gaza war.	
United Kingdom	London	22 October	Merz attended Western Balkans Summit.	
Belgium	Brussels	23–24 October	Merz attended the European Council summit.	
Turkey	Ankara	30 October	Merz attended the wreath-laying ceremony at the Atatürk Mausoleum. Merz met with President Recep Tayyip Erdoğan	
Brazil	Belém	7 November	Merz attended the COP30 pre-conference.	
South Africa	Johannesburg	22–23 November	Merz attended the G20 summit.	
Angola	Luanda	24 November	Merz attended the European Union and the African Union summit.	
Belgium	Brussels	5 December	Merz met with Prime Minister Bart De Wever and European Commission President Ursula von der Leyen.	
Jordan	Amman	6 December	Merz met with King Abdullah II bin al-Hussein.	
Israel	Jerusalem	7 December	Merz met with Prime Minister Benjamin Netanyahu, President Isaac Herzog, and opposition politicians Yair Lapid and Benny Gantz. Merz visited the Yad Vashem Holocaust Memorial.	
United Kingdom	London	8 December	Merz met with Prime Minister Keir Starmer, Ukrainian President Volodymyr Zelenskyy, and French President Emmanuel Macron.	
Belgium	Brussels	17–19 December	On 17 December, Merz attended the Western Balkans conference. On the next days, Merz participated in the European Council summit.	

== 2026 ==
Country	Location(s)	Date	Details	Image
France	Paris	6 January	Merz attended the Coalition of the Willing to discuss peace talks for the Ukraine War with US mediators Steve Witkoff and Jared Kushner.	
India	Ahmedabad and Bengaluru	11–13 January	Merz met with Prime Minister Narendra Modi. Merz visited the German companies.	
Switzerland	Davos	21–22 January	Merz delivered the speech at the World Economic Forum.	
Belgium	Brussels	22 January	Merz attended an extraordinary European Council summit on the Greenland crisis.	
Italy	Rome	23 January	Merz participated in the German-Italian government consultations.	
Croatia	Zagreb	30–31 January	Merz attended the EPP Leaders’ Retreat.	
Denmark	Herning	1 February	Merz attended the final of the Men's Handball European Championship between Denmark and Germany.	
Saudi Arabia	Riyadh	4 February	Merz met with Crown Prince and Prime Minister Mohammed bin Salman.	
Qatar	Doha	5 February	Merz met with Emir Tamim bin Hamad Al Thani.	
United Arab Emirates	Abu Dhabi	6 February	Merz met with President Mohamed bin Zayed Al Nahyan.	
Belgium	Antwerp and Bilzen	11–12 February	On February 11, Merz attended the European Industry Summit. On the next day, Merz attended the informal meeting of EU heads of state and government.	
China	Beijing and Hangzhou	25–26 February	Merz met with President Xi Jinping and Premier Li Qiang. Merz visited the Forbidden City and to a branch of the Mercedes-Benz Group. Merz visited the main site of the company Unitree Robotics and to a Siemens Energy branch.	
United States	Washington, D.C.	3 March	Merz met with President Donald Trump.	
Norway	Andenes and Bardufoss	12–13 March	Merz met with Prime Minister Jonas Gahr Støre and Canadian Prime Minister Mark Carney. Merz participated in a roundtable on space cooperation. Merz visited the NATO exercise Cold Response.	
Belgium	Brussels	19–20 March	Merz attended the European Council summit.	
France	Paris	17 April	Merz participated in a conference to discuss an international naval mission to secure the Strait of Hormuz.	
Cyprus	Nicosia and Ayia Napa	23–24 April	Merz attended the informal meeting of EU heads of state and government.	
Sweden	Stockholm	9 May	Merz attended the election covent (Sverigemötet) of the Moderate Party.	
Montenegro	Tivat	5 June	Merz attended the Western Balkans conference.	
United Kingdom	London	7 June	Merz met with Prime Minister Keir Starmer, French President Emmanuel Macron, and Ukrainian President Volodymyr Zelenskyy.	
France	Évian-les-Bains	15–17 June	Merz attended the 52nd G7 summit.	
Belgium	Brussels	18–19 June	Merz attended the European Council summit.	
Poland	Gdańsk	25 June	Merz attended the Ukraine Recovery Conference.	
Turkey	Ankara	7–8 July	Merz attended the 2026 NATO summit.	
France	Paris	13–14 July	On 13 July, Merz attended the Coalition of the Willing. On the next day, Merz attended Bastille Day celebrations.	
Ireland	Dublin	28 July	Merz is met with Prime Minister Micheál Martin.	
Finland	Rovaniemi	13–14 September	Merz attended the EU Arctic Summit.	
Ukraine	Kyiv	4 October	Met with President Volodymyr Zelenskyy.	
Belgium	Brussels	15–16 October	Merz attended the European Council.	
Montenegro	Tivat	22 October	Participation in the Western Balkans Conference.	
Singapore	Singapore	27–28 October	Merz met with Prime Minister Lawrence Wong and President Tharman Shanmugaratnam.	
Japan	Tokyo	28–29 October	Merz met with Prime Minister Sanae Takaichi.	
South Korea	Seoul	29–30 October	Merz met with President Lee Jae Myung.	
Ireland	Dublin	12 November	Merz attended the 9th European Political Community Summit.	

== Future trips ==
Country	Location	Date	Details
United States	Miami	14–15 December	Merz is scheduled to attend the G20 summit.

== Multilateral meetings ==
Friedrich Merz is scheduled to participate in the following summits during his chancellorship:

Group	Year				
Group	2025	2026	2027	2028	2029
UNGA	27 September, (United States) New York City	22–28 September, (United States) New York City	TBD, (United States) New York City	TBD, (United States) New York City	TBD, (United States) New York City
NATO	24–25 June, (Netherlands) The Hague	7–8 July, (Turkey) Ankara	TBD, (Albania) Tirana	TBA	TBA
Ukraine Recovery Conference	10–11 July, (Italy) Rome	25–26 June, (Poland) Gdańsk	27–28 January, (Estonia) Tallinn	TBA	TBA
G7	16–17 June, (Canada) Kananaskis	15–17 June, (France) Évian-les-Bains	TBD, United States	TBD, United Kingdom	TBD, Germany
G20	22–23 November, (South Africa) Johannesburg	14–15 December, (United States) Miami	TBD, United Kingdom	TBD, South Korea	TBA
EPC	16 May, (Albania) Tirana	4 May,^{[a]} (Armenia) Yerevan	TBD, (Switzerland) TBD	TBD (Azerbaijan) TBD	TBD
EPC	2 October, (Denmark) Copenhagen	12 November, (Republic of Ireland) Dublin	TBD, (Greece) TBD	TBD, (Latvia) TBD	TBD (Netherlands) TBD
COP	7 November, (Brazil) Belém	November (Turkey) Antalya	TBD (Ethiopia) Addis Ababa	TBD	TBD
North Sea Summit	none	26 January, (Germany) Hamburg	TBA	TBA	TBA
Berlin Process	22 October, (United Kingdom) London	TBA	TBA	TBA	TBA
Others	Multilateral meeting on Ukraine; 18 August, (United States) Washington, D.C.	Together for peace and security summit 6 January, (France) Paris	TBA	TBA	TBA
Others	Multilateral meeting on Ukraine; 18 August, (United States) Washington, D.C.	Determined to act 13 July, (France) Paris	TBA	TBA	TBA
██ = Future event. ██ = Did not attend.^aHe was absent due to "other commitments," with his only public schedule being a CDU board meeting in Berlin. He was represented at the summit by President of France Emmanuel Macron, who exercised Germany's voting rights.

== See also ==
- List of international trips made by Olaf Scholz, his predecessor
