= List of international trips made by Olaf Scholz =

This is the list of international trips made by Olaf Scholz, who served as Chancellor of Germany from 8 December 2021 until 6 May 2025.

== Summary ==
Countries visited by Olaf Scholz during his chancellorship. Germany 1 visit 2 visits 3–7 visits 8–10 visits 11 or more visits

The number of visits per country where chancellor Olaf Scholz traveled are:

- One visit to Argentina, Bulgaria, Canada, Chile, Denmark, Estonia, Ethiopia, Finland, Ghana, Hungary, Iceland, Indonesia, Jordan, Kazakhstan, Kenya, Kosovo, Nigeria, Niger, North Macedonia, Norway, Portugal, Qatar, Russia, Saudi Arabia, Senegal, Serbia, Slovenia, Singapore, South Africa, South Korea, Uzbekistan, and Vietnam
- Two visits to the Albania, Brazil, China, Czech Republic, Egypt, Greece, Moldova, Romania, Sweden, Turkey, and United Arab Emirates
- Three visits to India, Israel, Japan, Latvia, Lithuania, the Netherlands, Poland, Ukraine, and Vatican City
- Four visits to Italy and Switzerland
- Five visits to the United Kingdom
- Six visits to Spain
- Seven visits to the United States
- Twenty visits to France
- Twenty-three visits to Belgium

== 2021 ==
Country	Location(s)	Date	Details	Image
France	Paris	10 December	Scholz met with President Emmanuel Macron. Note: First trip abroad as Chancellor of Germany.	
Belgium	Brussels	10 December	Scholz met with European Commission President Ursula von der Leyen, European Council President Charles Michel, and NATO Secretary General Jens Stoltenberg.	
Poland	Warsaw	12 December	Scholz met with Prime Minister Mateusz Morawiecki.	
Belgium	Brussels	15–16 December	Scholz attended the Eastern Partnership summit and the European Council summit.	
Italy	Rome	20 December	Scholz met with Prime Minister Mario Draghi.	

== 2022 ==
Country	Location(s)	Date	Details	Image
Spain	Madrid	17 January	Scholz met with Prime Minister Pedro Sánchez.	
United States	Washington, D.C.	7 February	Scholz met with President Joe Biden. Scholz had a dinner with various senators.	
Ukraine	Kyiv	14 February	Scholz met with President Volodymyr Zelenskyy.	
Russia	Moscow	15 February	Scholz met with President Vladimir Putin.	
Belgium	Brussels	17–18 February	Scholz attended the summit of the heads of state and government of the European Union and the African Union.	
Belgium	Brussels	24 February	Scholz attended an extraordinary European Council summit on the Russian invasion of Ukraine.	
France	Paris	28 February	Scholz met with President Emmanuel Macron, European Commission President Ursula von der Leyen, and representatives of the European Round Table for Industry.	
Israel	Jerusalem	1–2 March	Scholz visited the Yad Vashem Holocaust Memorial. Scholz met with Prime Minister Naftali Bennett and Foreign Minister Yair Lapid.	
France	Versailles	10–11 March	Scholz attended the informal meeting of EU heads of state and government.	
Turkey	Ankara	14 March	Scholz met with President Recep Tayyip Erdoğan.	
Belgium	Brussels	24–25 March	Scholz attended an extraordinary 2022 NATO summit. Scholz attended the European Council summit.	
United Kingdom	London	8 April	Scholz met with Prime Minister Boris Johnson.	
Japan	Tokyo	27–29 April	Scholz met with Prime Minister Fumio Kishida. Scholz delivered the speech on German-Japanese relations at an economic event commemorating the 60th anniversary of the founding of the German Chamber of Industry and Commerce in Japan.	
Denmark	Esbjerg	18 May	Scholz attended the first North Sea Summit.	
Netherlands	The Hague	19 May	Scholz met with King Willem-Alexander and Prime Minister Mark Rutte.	
Senegal	Dakar	22 May	Scholz met with President Macky Sall. Scholz discussed with business representatives. Inauguration of the Diass solar park.	
Niger	Niamey	22–23 May	Scholz visited the base of the EUTM's Gazelle Special Forces Mission and the soldiers stationed there. Scholz met with President Mohamed Bazoum.	
South Africa	Johannesburg	24 May	Scholz met with President Cyril Ramaphosa. Scholz visited the Sasol company. Scholz participated in the anniversary celebration of the German Chamber of Commerce and Industry for Southern Africa.	
Switzerland	Davos	26 May	Scholz delivered the speech at the World Economic Forum.	
Belgium	Brussels	30–31 May	Scholz attended an extraordinary European Council summit.	
Lithuania	Vilnius	7 June	Scholz met with President Gitanas Nausėda, Prime Minister Ingrida Šimonytė, Estonian Prime Minister Kaja Kallas, and Latvian Prime Minister Krišjānis Kariņš. Scholz visited the EFP Battlegroup Lithuania.	
Kosovo	Pristina	10 June	Scholz met with Prime Minister Albin Kurti. Scholz visited the German KFOR troops.	
Serbia	Belgrade	10 June	Scholz met with Prime Minister Ana Brnabić and President Aleksandar Vučić.	
Greece	Thessaloniki	10 June	Scholz attended the meeting of the countries of the Regional Cooperation Council initiative.	
North Macedonia	Skopje	11 June	Scholz met with Prime Minister Dimitar Kovačevski.	
Bulgaria	Sofia	11 June	Scholz met with Prime Minister Kiril Petkov.	
Ukraine	Kyiv	16 June	Scholz met with President Volodymyr Zelenskyy, French President Emmanuel Macron, Italian Prime Minister Mario Draghi, and Romanian President Klaus Iohannis. Scholz visited the Kyiv suburb of Irpin to assess the war damage.	
Belgium	Brussels	23–24 June	Scholz attended the European Council summit.	
Spain	Madrid	28–30 June	Scholz attended the 2022 NATO summit.	
France	Paris	4 July	Scholz met with President Emmanuel Macron.	
United Kingdom	London	31 July	Scholz attended the final match of the 2022 Women's European Football Championship.	
Norway	Oslo	15 August	Scholz participated in the Nordic-German Meeting. Scholz met with Prime Minister Jonas Gahr Støre.	
Sweden	Stockholm and Södertälje	16 August	Scholz met with Prime Minister Magdalena Andersson. Scholz visited to the truck manufacturer Scania.	
Canada	Montreal, Toronto, and Stephenville	21–24 August	Scholz met with Prime Minister Justin Trudeau.	
Czech Republic	Prague	29 August	Scholz met with Prime Minister Petr Fiala. Scholz delivered the speech at Charles University.	
France	Évian-les-Bains	2 September	Scholz participated in a panel discussion and a banquet on the occasion of the 30th anniversary of the Franco-German business meeting.	
United States	New York City	19–21 September	Scholz attended the United Nations General Assembly.	
Saudi Arabia	Jeddah	24–25 September	Scholz met with Crown Prince Mohammed bin Salman.	
United Arab Emirates	Abu Dhabi	24–25 September	Scholz met with President Mohamed bin Zayed Al Nahyan.	
Qatar	Doha	24–25 September	Scholz met with Emir Tamim bin Hamad Al Thani.	
Spain	A Coruña	5–6 October	Sxholz participated in the German-Spanish government consultations. Scholz met with Prime Minister Pedro Sánchez.	
Czech Republic	Prague	6–7 October	Scholz attended the 1st European Political Community Summit.	
Belgium	Brussels	20–21 October	Scholz attended the European Council summit.	
France	Paris	26 October	Scholz met with President Emmanuel Macron.	
Greece	Athens	27 October	Scholz met with Prime Minister Kyriakos Mitsotakis.	
China	Beijing	4 November	Scholz met with President Xi Jinping and Premier Li Keqiang.	
Egypt	Sharm El Sheikh	7–8 November	Scholz attended the COP27 summit.	
Vietnam	Hanoi	13 November	Scholz met with Prime Minister Phạm Minh Chính and Communist Party General Secretary Nguyễn Phú Trọng.	
Singapore	Singapore	14 November	Scholz met with Prime Minister Lee Hsien Loong and President Halimah Yacob. Scholz participated in the 17th Asia-Pacific Conference of German Business.	
Indonesia	Bali	15–16 November	Scholz attended the G20 summit.	
Albania	Tirana	6 December	Scholz attended the EU-Western Balkans summit.	
Belgium	Brussels	14–15 December	On 14 December, Scholz attended the EU-ASEAN summit. On the next day, Scholz attended the European Council summit.	

== 2023 ==
Country	Location(s)	Date	Details	Image
Italy	Rome	5 January		
Vatican City	Vatican City	5 January	Scholz attended the funeral service of former Pope Benedict XVI.	
Switzerland	Davos	18 January	Scholz attended the World Economic Forum.	
France	Paris	22 January	Scholzed attended the 24th Franco-German Ministerial Council. Scholz attended and delivered speech at the ceremony commemorating the 60th anniversary of the Élysée Treaty. Scholz met with President Emmanuel Macron.	
Argentina	Buenos Aires	28 January	Scholz met with President Alberto Fernández.	
Chile	Santiago	29 January	Scholz met with President Gabriel Boric.	
Brazil	Brasília	30 January	Scholz met with President Luiz Inácio Lula da Silva.	
France	Paris	8 February	Scholz met with President Emmanuel Macron and Ukrainian President Volodymyr Zelenskyy.	
Belgium	Brussels	9–10 February	Scholz attended the European Council summit.	
Belgium	Zeebrugge	14 February	Scholz met with Prime Minister Alexander De Croo as part of a Belgian-German energy meeting.	
India	New Delhi and Bengaluru	24–26 February	Scholz met with Prime Minister Narendra Modi.	
United States	Washington, D.C.	2–4 March	Scholz met with President Joe Biden.	
Japan	Tokyo	17–18 March	Scholz met with Prime Minister Fumio Kishida. Scholz participated in and chaired of the first German-Japanese government consultations.	
Belgium	Brussels	23–24 March	Scholz attended the European Council summit.	
Netherlands	Rotterdam	27 March	Scholz met with Prime Minister Mark Rutte. Scholz participated and led the 4th German-Dutch government consultations.	
Romania	Bucharest	3 April	Scholz met with President Klaus Iohannis, Prime Minister Nicolae Ciucă, President of the Chamber of Deputies Marcel Ciolacu, and Moldovan President Maia Sandu.	
Portugal	Lisbon	19–20 April	Scholz met with Prime Minister António Costa.	
Belgium	Ostend	24 April	Scholz attended the second North Sea Summit.	
Ethiopia	Addis Ababa	4–5 May	Scholz met with African Union President Moussa Faki, Prime Minister Abiy Ahmed, the Head of the Interim Administration of Tigray Province Gatchew Reda, and President Sahle-Work Zewde.	
Kenya	Nairobi and Lake Naivasha	5–6 May	Scholz met with President William Ruto. Scholz also met with representatives from politics, business, civil society and culture.	
France	Strasbourg	9 May	Scholz delivered the speech to the European Parliament.	
Iceland	Reykjavík	16–17 May	Scholz attended the 4th Council of Europe summit.	
Japan	Hiroshima	19–21 May	Scholz attended 49th G7 summit.	
South Korea	Seoul and Demilitarized zone	21 May	Scholz met with President Yoon Suk Yeol. Scholz visited the Demilitarized Zone.	
Estonia	Tallinn	26 May	Scholz met with Prime Minister Kaja Kallas, Lithuanian President Gitanas Nausėda, and Latvian Prime Minister Krišjānis Kariņš.	
Moldova	Bulboaca	1 June	Scholz attended the 2nd European Political Community Summit.	
Italy	Rome	8 June	Scholz met with Prime Minister Giorgia Meloni and President Sergio Mattarella.	
France	Paris	12 June	Scholz met with President Emmanuel Macron and Polish President Andrzej Duda in the Weimar Triangle format.	
France	Paris	22–23 June	Scholz participated in the "Summit for a New Global Financing Pact". Scholz met with President Emmanuel Macron.	
Belgium	Brussels	29–30 June	Scholz attended the European Council summit.	
Lithuania	Vilnius	11–12 July	Scholz attended the 2023 NATO summit.	
Belgium	Brussels	17–18 July	Scholz attended the 3rd EU–CELAC summit.	
India	New Delhi	9–10 September	Scholz attended the G20 summit.	
United States	New York City	17–20 September	Scholz attended the United Nations General Assembly.	
Spain	Granada	5–6 October	Attended the 3rd European Political Community Summit. Scholz attended the informal meeting of EU heads of state or government.	
Albania	Tirana	16 October	Scholz attended the Western Balkans summit.	
Israel	Tel Aviv-Jaffa	17 October	Scholz met with Secretary of State Eli Cohen, Prime Minister Benjamin Netanyahu, and President Isaac Herzog.	
Egypt	Cairo	18 October	Scholz met with President Abdel Fattah el-Sisi. Scholz also met with UN Emergency Relief Coordinator Martin Griffiths.	
Belgium	Brussels	26–27 October	Scholz attended the European Council summit.	
Nigeria	Abuja and Lagos	29–31 October	Scholz met with President Bola Tinubu. Scholz also met with ECOWAS Commission President Omar Touray.	
Ghana	Accra	29–31 October	Scholz met with President Nana Akufo-Addo.	
Spain	Málaga	10 November	Scholz met with Prime Minister Pedro Sánchez.	
United Arab Emirates	Dubai	1 December	Scholz attended the COP28 summit.	
Belgium	Brussels	13–15 December	On 13 December, Scholz attended the Western Balkans conference. On the next days, Scholz attended the European Council summit.	

== 2024 ==
Country	Location(s)	Date	Details	Image
Belgium	Brussels	31 January	Scholz attended the memorial service for former European Commission president Jacques Delors.	
Belgium	Brussels	1 February	Scholz attended an extraordinary European Council summit.	
United States	Washington, D.C.	8–9 February	Scholz met with President Joe Biden.	
France	Paris	26 February	Scholz participated in the conference on support for Ukraine.	
Italy	Rome	1 March	Scholz met with President Sergio Mattarella.	
Vatican City	Vatican City	2 March	Scholz attended the audience with Pope Francis.	
Jordan	Aqaba	17 March	Scholz met with King Abdullah II.	
Israel	Jerusalem	17 March	Scholz met with Prime Minister Benjamin Netanyahu and President Issac Herzog.	
Belgium	Brussels	21–22 March	Scholz attended the European Council summit.	
Slovenia	Ljubljana	26 March	Scholz met with Prime Minister Robert Golob.	
Romania	Bucharest	6 April	Scholz met with Prime Minister Marcel Ciolacu.	
China	Chongqing, Shanghai, and Beijing	13–16 April	Scholz met with President Xi Jinping and Premier Li Qiang.	
Belgium	Brussels	17–18 April	Scholz attended an extraordinary European Council summit.	
Lithuania	Pabradė	6 May	Scholz met with President Gitanas Nausėda. Troop visited the 10th Armoured Division stationed in Lithuania as part of the Quadriga exercise.	
Latvia	Riga	6 May	Scholz met with Prime Minister Evika Siliņa, Estonian Prime Minister Kaja Kallas, and Lithuanian Prime Minister Ingrida Šimonytė.	
Sweden	Stockholm	13 May	Scholz met with Prime Minister Ulf Kristersson, Danish Prime Minister Mette Frederiksen, Finnish Prime Minister Petteri Orpo, Icelandic Prime Minister Bjarni Benediktsson, and Norwegian Prime Minister Jonas Gahr Støre. Scholz visited the company Ericsson.	
France	Omaha Beach	6 June	Scholz attended the commemoration of the 80th anniversary of the landing of Allied troops in Normandy.	
Italy	Fasano	13–15 June	Scholz attended the 50th G7 summit.	
Switzerland	Lucerne	15–16 June	Scholz attended the Ukraine peace summit.	
Belgium	Brussels	17 June	Scholz attended the informal meeting of EU heads of state and government.	
Belgium	Brussels	27–28 June	Scholz attended the European Council summit.	
Poland	Warsaw	2 July	Scholz met with Prime Minister Donald Tusk. Scholz participated in the German-Polish intergovernmental consultations.	
United States	Washington, D.C.	9–11 July	Scholz attended the 2024 NATO summit.	
United Kingdom	Woodstock	18 July	Scholz attended the 4th European Political Community Summit.	
Serbia	Belgrade	19 July	Scholz met with President Aleksandar Vučić. Scholz signed a joint lithium agreement with Serbia and the European Union.	
France	Paris	26–27 July	Scholz attended the opening ceremony of the 2024 Summer Olympics. Scholz visited the German athletes at the Olympic Village.	
France	Paris	8–10 August	Scholz attended the 2024 Summer Olympics. Scholz met with President of the International Olympic Committee Thomas Bach.	
Moldova	Chișinău	21 August	Scholz met with President Maia Sandu and Prime Minister Dorin Recean.	.
France	Évian-les-Bains	6 September	Scholz met with President Emmanuel Macron. Scholz participated in the German-French business meeting.	
Uzbekistan	Samarqand	15–16 September	Scholz met with President Shavkat Mirziyoyev. Scholz participated in the German-Uzbek business roundtable.	
Kazakhstan	Astana	15–16 September	Scholz met with President Kassym-Jomart Tokayev, Kyrgyz President Sadyr Japarov, Tajikistani President Emomali Rahmon, and Turkmen President Serdar Berdimuhamedov. Scholz participated in the German-Kazakh economic forum.	
United States	New York City	21–24 September	Scholz attended the United Nations General Assembly.	
Belgium	Brussels	17 October	Scholz attended the European Council summit and the Euro summit.	
Turkey	Istanbul	18–19 October	Scholz met with President Recep Tayyip Erdoğan.	
India	New Delhi	24–26 October	Met with President Droupadi Murmu and Prime Minister Narendra Modi.	
Hungary	Budapest	7–8 November	Scholz attended the informal meeting of EU heads of state and government.	
Brazil	Rio de Janeiro	18–19 November	Scholz attended the G20 summit.	
Ukraine	Kyiv	2 December	Met with President Volodymyr Zelenskyy.	
Belgium	Brussels	18–19 December	On 18 December, Scholz attended the Western Balkans conference. On the next day, Scholz attended the European Council summit.	

== 2025 ==
Country	Location(s)	Date	Details	Image
Finland	Helsinki	14 January	Scholz attended the Baltic Sea NATO Allies Summit. Scholz met with President Alexander Stubb, Estonian Prime Minister Kristen Michal, NATO Secretary General Mark Rutte, and European Commission Vice President Henna Virkkunen.	
Switzerland	Davos	21 January	Scholz delivered the speech at the World Economic Forum.	
France	Paris	22 January	Scholz met with President Emmanuel Macron on the occasion of the anniversary of the Élysée Treaty.	
Poland	Kraków and Oświęcim	27 January	Scholz met with Prime Minister Donald Tusk. Scholz attended the commemoration of the 80th anniversary of the liberation of the Auschwitz concentration camp.	
United Kingdom	London	2 February	Scholz met with Prime Minister Keir Starmer.	
Belgium	Brussels	3 February	Scholz attended the informal meeting of EU heads of state and government.	
France	Paris	10 February	Scholz attended the Artificial Intelligence Action Summit.	
France	Paris	17 February	Scholz attended an emergency meeting with European leaders in response to U.S. President Donald Trump's push for peace negotiations to end the Russo-Ukrainian War.	
United Kingdom	London	2 March	Scholz attended the London summit on support for Ukraine.	
Belgium	Brussels	6 March	Scholz attended an extraordinary European Council summit.	
Belgium	Brussels	20–21 March	Scholz attended the European Council summit.	
France	Paris	27 March	Scholz attended the Coalition of the willing on support for Ukraine.	
Spain	Madrid	3 April	Scholz met with Prime Minister Pedro Sánchez.	
Poland	Warsaw	16 April	Scholz met with Prime Minister Donald Tusk.	
Vatican City	Vatican City	26 April	Scholz attended the funeral of Pope Francis.	
France	Paris	30 April	Scholz met with President Emmanuel Macron. Note: Last trip abroad as Chancellor of Germany.	

== Multilateral meetings ==
Olaf Scholz participated in the following summits during his chancellorship:

Group	Year			
Group	2022	2023	2024	2025
UNGA	20–21 September, (United States) New York City	19–20 September, (United States) New York City	22–24 September, (United States) New York City	
NATO	24 March, (Belgium) Brussels	11–12 July, (Lithuania) Vilnius	9–11 July, (United States) Washington, D.C.	
NATO	28–30 June, (Spain) Madrid	11–12 July, (Lithuania) Vilnius	9–11 July, (United States) Washington, D.C.	
G7	26–28 June, (Germany) Schloss Elmau	19–21 May, (Japan) Hiroshima	13–15 June, (Italy) Fasano	
G20	15–16 November, (Indonesia) Bali	9–10 September, (India) New Delhi	18–19 November, (Brazil) Rio de Janeiro	
EPC	6 October, (Czech Republic) Prague	1 June, (Moldova) Bulboaca	18 July, (United Kingdom) Woodstock	
EPC	6 October, (Czech Republic) Prague	5 October, (Spain) Granada	7 November, (Hungary) Budapest	
EU–CELAC	none	17–18 July, (Belgium) Brussels	none	
North Sea Summit	18 May, (Denmark) Esbjerg	24 April, (Belgium) Ostend	none	none
Berlin Process	3 November, (Germany) Berlin	16 October, (Albania) Tirana	14 October, (Germany) Berlin	
Others	none	none	Global Peace Summit; 15–16 June, (Switzerland) Lucerne	Securing our future 2 March, (United Kingdom) London
Others	none	none	Global Peace Summit; 15–16 June, (Switzerland) Lucerne	15 March, (videoconference); United Kingdom
Others	none	none	Global Peace Summit; 15–16 June, (Switzerland) Lucerne	Building a robust peace for Ukraine and Europe; 27 March, (France) Paris
██ = Did not attend / participate.

== See also ==
- List of international trips made by Angela Merkel, his predecessor
- List of international trips made by Friedrich Merz, his successor
