= European Round Table =

European Round Table may refer to:

- European Retail Round Table (ERRT), a European organization that represented companies from the European retail sector until 2019
- European Round Table for Industry (ERT), a European organization that represents companies from the European industrial sector, formerly known as the European Round Table of Industrialists.
- European Round Table on Patent Practice (EUROTAB)
