= Antonio Pérez Yuste =

Professor of Telecommunications Engineering

- Born: June 21, 1968 (age 58); Toledo, Spain
- Education: Technical University of Madrid
- Awards: INISEL Award (1991), Technical University of Madrid Medal (2004), Technical University of Madrid Award to Innovation in Education (2009), Technical University of Madrid Award to Excellence in Education (2018)
- Scientific career
- Fields: Wireless communication, History of telecommunication
- Workplaces: Technical University of Madrid
- Doctoral advisor: Magdalena Salazar Palma

Antonio Pérez Yuste (21 June 1968) is a professor of Telecommunications Engineering at Technical University of Madrid, Spain (Spanish: Universidad Politécnica de Madrid, UPM). He is a senior member of the Institute of Electrical and Electronics Engineers (IEEE), an appointed member to the IEEE Spain Section Executive Committee, and a Correspondent Member to the Royal Academy of Sciences and Arts of Barcelona (Spain).

== Biography ==
Yuste was born in Toledo, Spain. He joined the Department of Communications and Audio & Video Engineering at Technical University of Madrid as an assistant professor in 1991, where he carried out research on Digital Communication Systems. In 1995, he changed his position to associate professor, being involved with Numerical Methods Applied to Electromagnetic Field problems. And, in 2008, he was finally promoted to a tenured professor position in the same university.

Since joining the Technical University of Madrid, he has held some different academic positions: he was vice director of the Technical University of Madrid's School of Telecommunications from 1997 to 2001, director of that school from 2001 to 2004, and director of the Technical University of Madrid President's Cabinet from 2004 to 2012. From September 2012 to February 2014, he was appointed as the UPM Sino-Spanish Campus Director to Shanghai (China), being in charge of setting up and starting the first delegation office of UPM out of Spain. From March to July 2014 he was in charge of the UPM Sino-Spanish Cooperation Office in Madrid to serve as a liaison to the former China UPM office. In 2014, he was appointed under the Chinese Government's prestigious ‘National High-End Foreign Expert Program’ to a 3-year Guest Professorship at Shanghai's Tongji University. After that, in 2017, he gained a three-years-term position (2017-2019) as Guest Professor to the Tongji College of Electronics and Information Engineering, in Shanghai (China). He has also taught in the “Institut d’Electronique, de Microélectronique, et de Nanotechnologie”, at the University of Lille (France), under an Erasmus+ funded program in 2017.

From 1999 to 2009, he was director of a postgraduate program on Satellite Communications at Technical University of Madrid; from 2007 to 2010, he was also in charge of a Summer Course on Satellite Technology Applications and Services offered in the Technical University of Madrid Summer Campus at the Royal Site of La Granja de San Ildefonso, Segovia, Spain; and from January 2010 to December 2012, he was Director of a Master's Program Degree on Satellite Technology at Technical University of Madrid.

IEEE Milestone Plaque dedicated to the Telekino of Torres Quevedo.

Currently, his research interest is focused on the wireless communication and the wireless channel modeling. In addition, he is a specialist in the history of electrical and electronic engineering, with special emphasis in the history of telecommunication and the development of the Information society. Yuste's historical studies have been published in the Proceedings of the IEEE and have been presented in different IEEE International Conferences. Some remarkable results in this area were the organization of an International Exhibition dedicated to Nikola Tesla in Madrid, Spain (2008), a research work on the Spanish Engineer Leonardo Torres Quevedo and his Telekino, which led to the dedication of an IEEE Milestone in Electrical Engineering and Computing in Madrid in March 2007, and a research work on the Spanish Enlightenment scientist Francisco Salva Campillo and his early contribution to the development of the electric telegraph, which led to the dedication of a second IEEE Milestone in Barcelona in May 2019.

He has taught undergraduate courses on Analog and Digital Communications, Electromagnetism and Wave Propagation and their related laboratories. He has also taught undergraduate courses on Policy and Regulation of Telecommunications in Spain, and graduate courses on the History of Telecommunications. At present, he teaches a first-year course on Introduction to Telecommunications, a second-year course on Theory of Communications, and a fourth year course on Wireless Communications, all at Technical University of Madrid.

He gained his B.Eng. in RadioCommunications (1991), M.Eng. in Telecommunications (1996) and Ph.D. (cum laude) in Telecommunications Engineering (2004), all from the Technical University of Madrid. His Ph.D. thesis was related to the history of the Spanish Telephone Service. He also obtained his B.Sc. in physics (1992) from the National University for Distance Education (Universidad Nacional de Educación a Distancia), Spain.

He received the ‘INISEL Award’ to the best Bachelor Thesis, in 1991, and was distinguished with the ‘Faculty Collaboration Award’ from the Escuela Universitaria de Ingeniería Técnica de Telecomunicación (EUITT) in 1996. He also received the ‘Technical University of Madrid Medal’ in 2004 for his outstanding work as a faculty director, the ‘Technical University of Madrid Award to Innovation in Education’, in 2009, for his best educational practices carried out in the past five years, and the 'Technical University of Madrid Award to Excellence in Education', in 2018, for his remarkable academic career.

Yuste is IEEE Member (from January 1993), IEEE Senior Member (from May 2011), member of the IEEE Spain Section Executive Committee (from January 2012), and former member of the IEEE History Committee (from 2011 to 2018). He was IEEE Milestones Coordinator for IEEE Regions 8 to 10 during two years (2012-2013), member of IEEE Awards Sub-Committee in the IEEE History Committee for one year (2016), and Appointed Member of the SHOT International Outreach Committee for three years (2010-2012). As a graduate student at Technical University of Madrid, he was originally the promoter of its Alumni Social Site in LinkedIn, and is currently acting as his Community Manager.

== Selected publications ==
=== English ===
- Satellite Fingerprinting Methods for GNSS Spoofing Detection, MDPI Sensors, 2024, 24(23), 7698, Dec 2024, Paper.
- Design of New BLE GAP Roles for Vehicular Communications, MDPI Sensors, 2024, 24(15), 4835, Jul 2024, Paper.
- SCER Spoofing attacks on the Galileo Open Service and Machine Learning techniques for end-user protection, IEEE Access, ISSN 2169-3536, vol. 8, n. 1, pp. 85515-85532, May 2020, Paper.
- A Novel Experiment-Free Site-Specific TDoA Localization Performance-Evaluation Approach, MDPI Sensors, 2020, 20(4), 1035, Feb 2020, Paper.
- An Empirical Air-to-Ground Channel Model Based on Passive Measurements in LTE, IEEE Transactions on Vehicular Technology, ISSN 0018-9545, vol. 68, n. 2, pp. 1140-1154, February 2019, Citation & Abstract.
- Hough-Transform-Based Cluster Identification and Modeling for V2V Channels Based on Measurements, IEEE Transactions on Vehicular Technology, ISSN 0018-9545, vol. 67, n. 5, pp. 3838–3852, May 2018, Citation & Abstract.
- Neural-Network-Assisted UE Localization Using Radio-channel Fingerprints in LTE Networks, IEEE Access, ISSN 2169-3536, vol. 5, n. 1, pp. 12071–12087, June 2017, Citation & Abstract.
- An Empirical Random-Cluster Model for Subway Channels Based on Passive Measurements in UMTS, IEEE Transactions on Communications, ISSN 0090-6778, vol. 64, n. 8, pp. 3563–3575, August 2016, Citation & Abstract.
- An Entrepreneurship-Based Learning (EBL) Experience in Information and Communication Technologies (ICTs), International Journal of Information Technology & Computer Science (IJITCS), ISSN 2091-1610, vol. 16, nº 2, pp. 26–35, July–August 2014, Citation & Abstract.
- The Origins of Behn's International System, Proceedings of the IEEE, ISSN 0018-9219, vol. 99, n. 11, pp. 2075–2078, November 2011, Citation & Abstract.
- The Role of the White House in the Establishment of a Governmental Radio Monopoly in the United States. The Case of the Radio Corporation of America, 2nd IEEE Conference on the History of Telecommunications (HISTELCON’2010), E-ISBN 978-1-4244-7451-6, Print ISBN 978-1-4244-7450-9, Madrid, Spain, 3–5 November 2010, Citation & Abstract
- Francisco Salva's Electric Telegraph, Proceedings of the IEEE, ISSN 0018-9219, vol. 98, n. 11, pp. 1974–1977, November 2010, Citation & Abstract.
- “Cuerpo de Telégrafos”: First Attempts to Create a Professional Body for Electrical Communications in Spain, IEEE International Conference on the History of Technical Societies, ISBN 978-1-4244-5119-7, Philadelphia, PA, USA, 5–7 August 2009, Citation & Abstract.
- History of the Spanish Association of Telecommunication Engineers (Asociación Española de Ingenieros de Telecomunicación, AEIT), IEEE International Conference on the History of Technical Societies, ISBN 978-1-4244-5119-7, Philadelphia, PA, USA, 5–7 August 2009, Citation & Abstract.
- Work in Progress - an Undergraduate B-learning Experience for the Teaching of Politics of Telecommunications and Information Society, Frontiers in Education Conference (FIE), ISBN 978-1-4244-1969-2, Saratoga, NY, USA, 22–25 October 2008, Citation & Abstract.
- Salvá’s Electric Telegraph Based on Volta's Battery, History of Telecommunications Conference (HISTELCON), ISBN 978-1-4244-2530-3, Paris, France, 11–12 September 2008, Citation & Abstract.
- Early Developments of Wireless Remote Control: the Telekino of Torres Quevedo, Proceedings of the IEEE, ISSN 0018-9219, vol. 96, n. 1, pp. 186–189, January 2008, Citation & Abstract.
- Scanning Our Past from Madrid: Leonardo Torres Quevedo, Proceedings of the IEEE, ISSN 0018-9219, vol. 93, n. 7, pp. 1379–1382, July 2005, Citation & Abstract.
- Celebrating 75 years of Madrid-Washington Telephone Service, Proceedings of the IEEE, ISSN 0018-9219, vol. 91, n. 10, pp. 1738–1742, October 2003, Citation & Abstract.
- The Introduction of Automatic Telephone Service in Madrid, Proceedings of the IEEE, ISSN 0018-9219, vol. 91, n. 7, pp. 1141–1144, July 2003, Citation & Abstract.

=== Spanish ===
- Experiencias y Metodologías en Asignaturas b-learning para la Formación y Evaluación en Competencias Genéricas en Ingeniería, Revista La Cuestión Universitaria, Cátedra UNESCO de Gestión y Política Universitaria, ISSN 1988-236X, n. 5, pp. 33–45, Abril 2009, Citation & Text.
- La Televisión Mecánica, capítulo del libro: Detrás de la Cámara. Historia de la Televisión y de sus Cincuenta Años en España, Coordinadora: Olga Pérez Sanjuan, Colegio Oficial de Ingenieros de Telecomunicación, ISBN 978-84-9350-498-4, pp. 65–82. Madrid, 2008, Citation & Abstract.
- El Telekino de Torres Quevedo, BIT, ISSN 0210-3923, n. 168, pp. 98–100, Abril-Mayo 2008, Text.
- La creación de la Compañía Telefónica Nacional de España en la dictadura de Primo de Rivera, Cuadernos de Historia Contemporánea, ISSN 0214-400X, vol. 29, pp. 95–117, 2007, Text.
- Sobre la Etimología de Televisión, BIT, ISSN 0210-3923, n. 164, pp. 101–103, Agosto-Septiembre 2007, Text.
- Zworykin y Farnsworth: Pioneros de la Televisión Electrónica, ANTENA, Depósito Legal: M-16.255-1964, n. 167, pp. 63–66, Marzo 2007, Text.
- Baird y Jenkins: Pioneros de la Televisión Mecánica, ANTENA, Depósito Legal: M-16.255-1964, n. 166, pp. 72–74, Diciembre 2006, Text.
- De la Cierva y la Primera Ley de Telecomunicaciones de España, BIT, ISSN 0210-3923, n. 157, pp. 87–90, Junio-Julio 2006, Text.
- Sobre la Etimología de Telecomunicación, BIT, ISSN 0210-3923, n. 156, pp. 77–79, Abril-Mayo 2006, Text.
- El Servicio de Telefonía Móvil en España, capítulo del libro: De las señales de humo a la Sociedad del Conocimiento. 150 años de telecomunicaciones en España, Coordinadora: Olga Pérez Sanjuan, Colegio Oficial de Ingenieros de Telecomunicación, ISBN 84-934124-7-3, pp. 232–255, Madrid, 2006, Citation & Abstract.
