= Monastery of Yuste =

Spanish monastery founded in 1402

Coordinates: 40°06′51″N 5°44′20″W

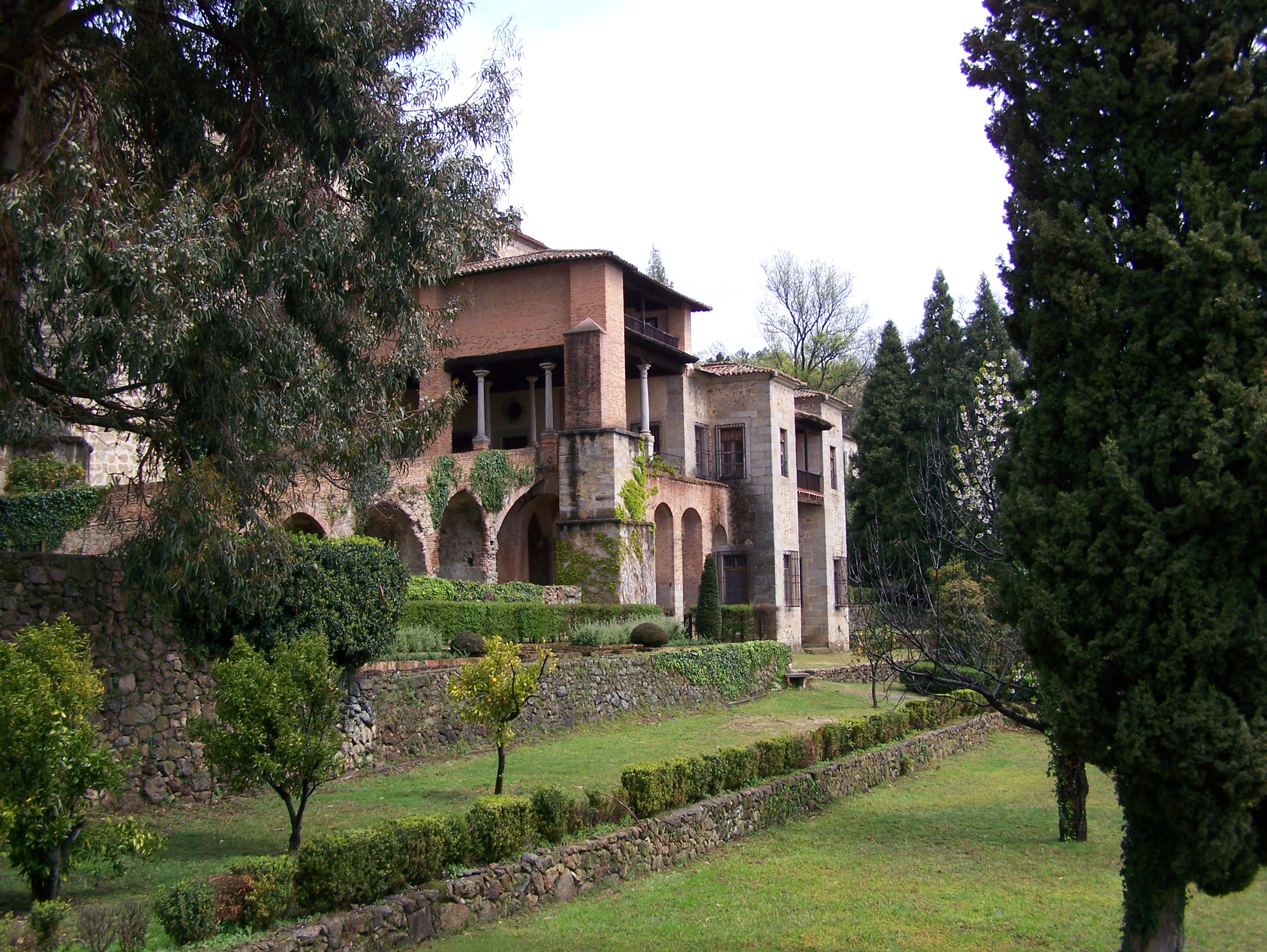
- Monastery of Yuste

General information
- Location: Cuacos de Yuste, Spain

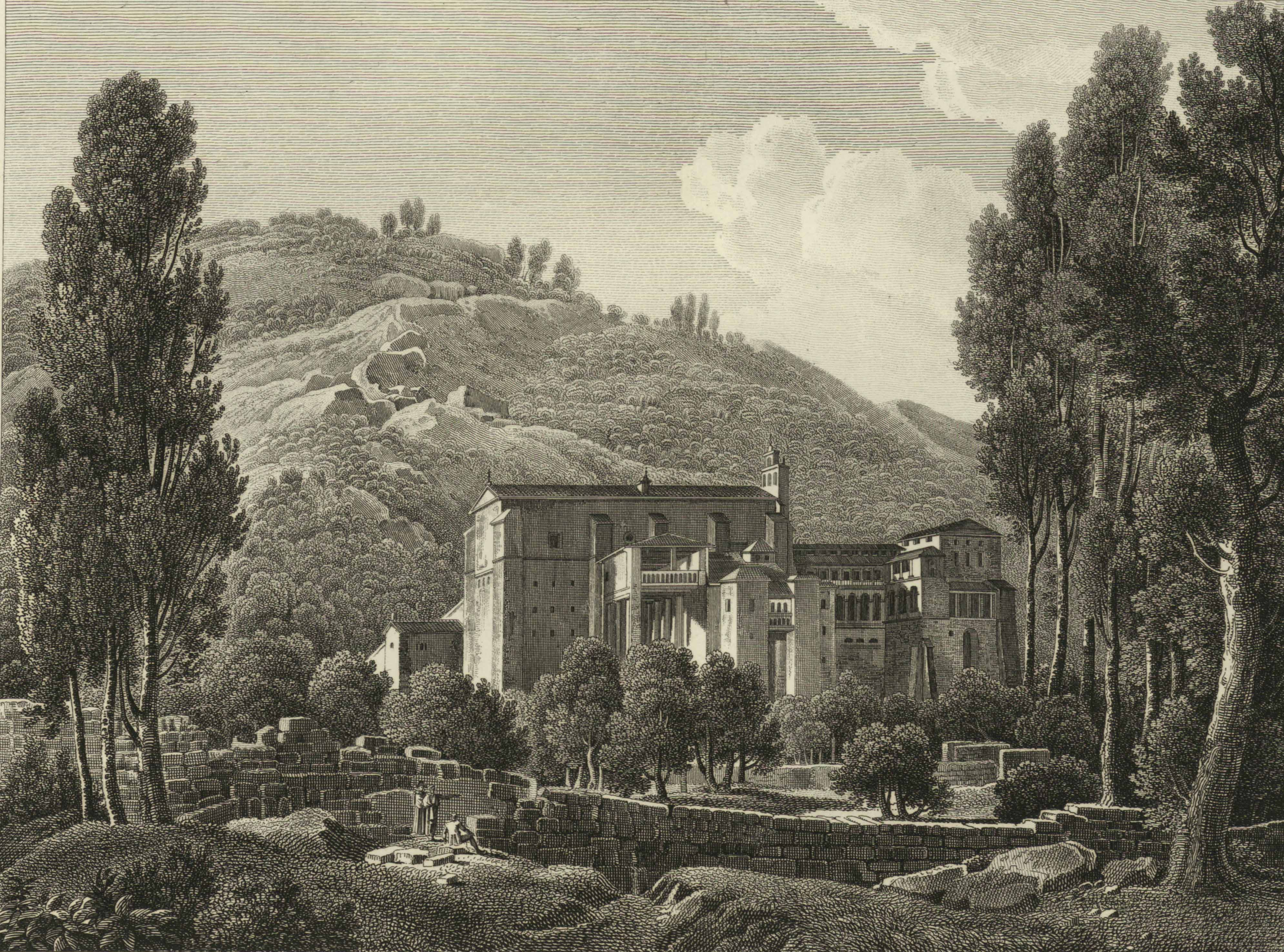
Monastery of Yuste in 1811 by Alexandre de Laborde

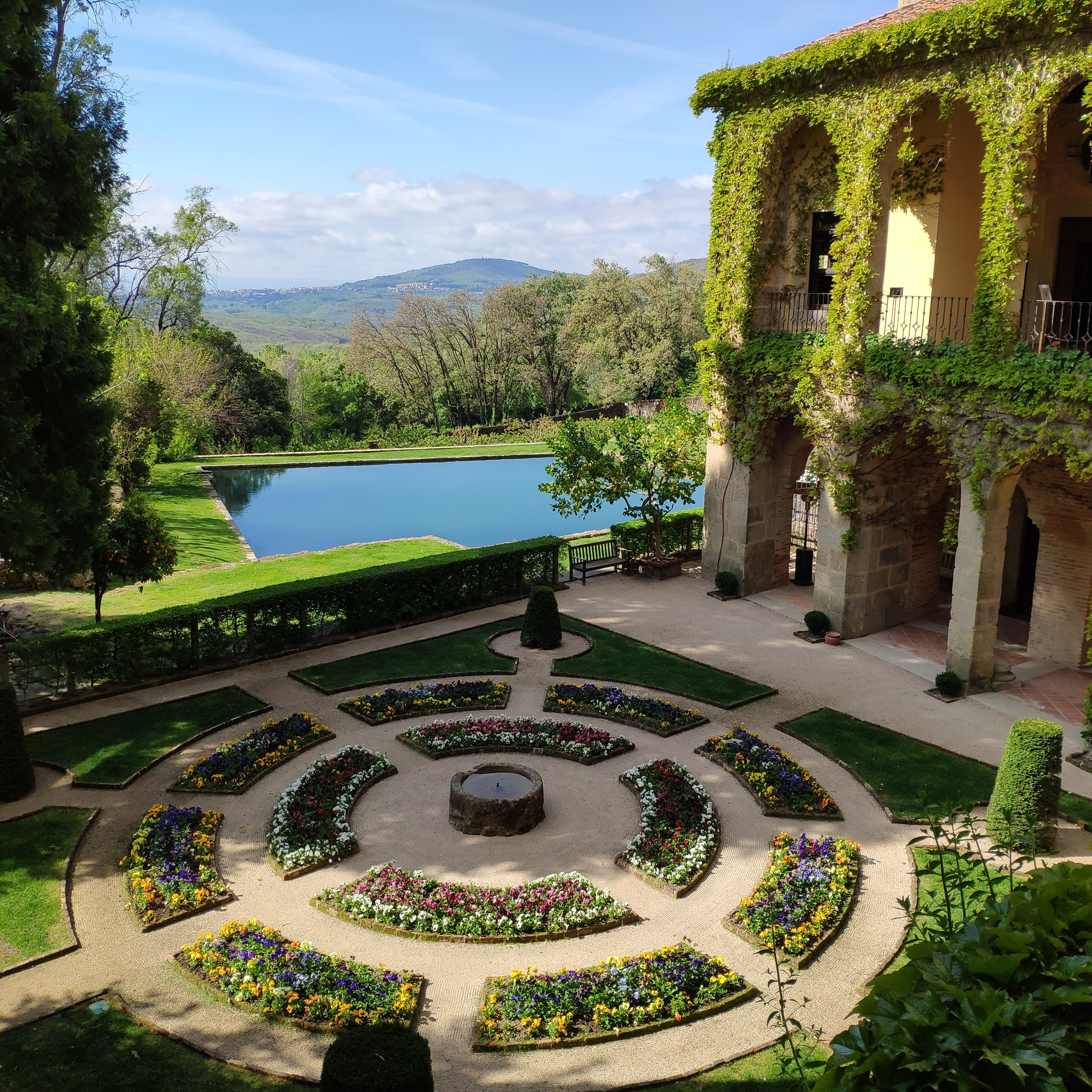
Monastery garden.

The Monastery of Yuste is a monastery in the small village now called Cuacos de Yuste (in older works San Yuste or San Just) in the province of Cáceres in the autonomous community of Extremadura, Spain. The monastery was founded by the Hieronymite order of monks in 1402.

It is the monastery and palace house in which Charles V of the Holy Roman Empire and King of Spain resided from after his abdication until his death.

== History ==
In 1556 Charles V, Holy Roman Emperor, retired to the Monastery of Yuste, near Cuacos de Yuste, after having abdicated the Spanish crown in favour of his son Philip II of Spain and the crown of the Holy Roman Empire in favour of his brother Ferdinand I. He intended to devote the rest of his life to prayer in this remote and obscure monastery. Nonetheless, the monastery had to be expanded that year to make room for the emperor and the 50 or 60 members of his entourage.

From time to time well-known people, including his illegitimate son Don Juan de Austria and his heir Philip II of Spain, came to visit the retired emperor. A fictitious visit by Carlos, Prince of Asturias, and other characters provides the moonlit setting for Act V of the original version of Giuseppe Verdi's opera Don Carlos, and Yuste is also the setting for both scenes of Act II of that long and celebrated opera. Charles died there on September 21, 1558. He was buried in the monastery church, though his remains were later transferred to the Royal Monastery of San Lorenzo del Escorial.

In 1809, during the Peninsular War, the monastery was burnt by the French army. It was also affected by the Ecclesiastical confiscations of Mendizábal. The site was left in ruins until 1949, when the Spanish government restored it at the behest of Francisco Franco. The furniture of the choir (which was commissioned at the end of the 15th century) was retrieved from churches where it had been relocated.

== Access ==
The area around Yuste, the Valle del Jerte, is now an eco-tourist destination. Tourists can visit the monastery, including the emperor's apartments. The valley is also known for its cherry trees and the beauty of the surrounding landscape.

The monastery is currently inhabited by monks of the Pauline Order. In 2007 the monastery was awarded with the European Heritage Label.
