= Cuacos de Yuste =

Municipality in Cáceres, Spain

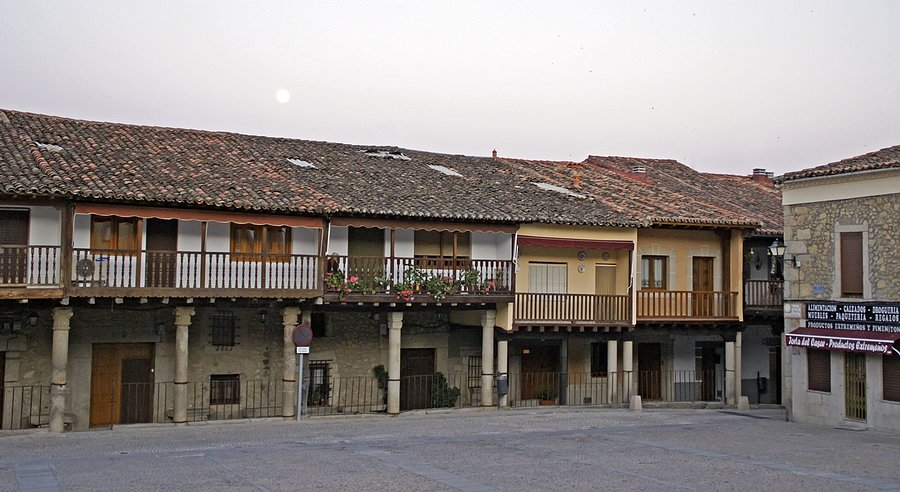

- Coat of arms

- Location in Spain.
- Coordinates: 40°06′N 5°43′W
- Country: Spain
- Autonomous community: Cáceres

Area
  - Total: 52.63 km^{2} (20.32 sq mi)
- Elevation: 519 m (1,703 ft)

Population (2025-01-01)
  - Total: 809
  - Density: 15.4/km^{2} (39.8/sq mi)
- Time zone: UTC+1 (CET)
  - Summer (DST): UTC+2 (CEST)
- Website: www.cuacosdeyuste.es

Cuacos de Yuste is a municipality in the province of Cáceres and autonomous community of Extremadura, Spain. The municipality covers an area of 52.6 square kilometres (20.3 sq mi) and as of 2011 had a population of 902 people. It is best known for the Monastery of Yuste, where Charles V, Holy Roman Emperor, retired and died.

== See also ==
- List of municipalities in Cáceres
