= Franco-German Ministerial Council =

Regular meeting of government ministers

The Franco-German Ministerial Council (French: Conseil des ministres franco-allemands, German: Deutsch-Französischer Ministerrat) is the regular meeting of the ministerial cabinet of both the government of Germany and the government of France. The joint ministerial council is held approximately twice a year—in spring and autumn.

== History ==
The Franco-German Ministerial Council replaces the regular summits of the heads of state of France and Germany as designated in the Élysée Treaty of 1963. During the celebrations of the 40th anniversary of the Élysée Treaty it was decided to put the ministerial staff into regular direct contact. It is the duty of the respective foreign ministers to prepare the ministerial council.

The Franco-German anniversary declaration of 22 January 2003 also includes sections to put councils at regional level in direct contact. The annual summits of the heads of state of France and Germany had already been replaced by Blaesheim Process with regular meetings every six to eight weeks named after the little town Blaesheim near Strasbourg where the first meeting was held on 31 January 2001.

The joint ministerial council represents another step in the Franco-German integration —the original Elysee Treaty of 1963 saw the creation of a student exchange office (Office franco-allemand pour la jeunesse - OFAJ / Deutsch-Französisches Jugendwerk - DFJW) that was extended into a joint council on cultural exchange in 1988 (Haut-Conseil culturel franco-allemand - HCCFA / Deutsch-Französischer Kulturrat - DFKR). On the 22nd anniversary of the Elysee Treaty (22 January 1988) a joint council on economic affairs was created (Conseil économique et financier franco-allemand - CEFFA / Deutsch-französischer Finanz- und Wirtschaftsrat - DFFWR) organising meetings of the ministers of finance about four times a year and a joint council on security affairs was created (Conseil franco-allemand de défense et de sécurité - CFADS / Deutsch-Französischer Verteidigungs- und Sicherheitsrat - DFVSR) organising meetings of the ministers of external affairs and the military about twice a year. An annual joint ministerial council on environment protection (Conseil franco-allemand de l’environnement - CFAE / Deutsch-Französischer Umweltrat) was first held on 13 February 1990 following a resolution of the ministerial consultations on 2 November 1989.

On the 50th anniversary of the Elysee Treaty a declaration was resolved by the Franco-German Ministerial Council on 22 January 2013. The "Erklärung des Deutsch-Französischen Ministerrats anlässlich des 50. Jahrestags des Élysée-Vertrags" asked for more integration on the administration level. After that point the joint ministerial council meetings turned to an annual interval. The declaration named goals such as the harmonisation of the social modell, the education system, the taxation standard and it pointed to MALE drones as part of the bilateral military collaboration.

On the 2017 summit the creation of an integration office (Conseil franco-allemand de l’intégration - CFAI / Deutsch-Französische Integrationsrat - DFIR) was resolved. This committee is handling tasks of the migrant crisis 2015 and it promotes actions on the Franco-German University which was founded in 2013. This was followed by the 2018 Meseburg Declaration which asked for the introduction of a common corporate tax and the start of common military research naming the Main Ground Combat System (MGCS) and the Future Combat Aerial System (FCAS). In 2019 Spain joined the Future Combat Air System programme to be developed until 2040 under the leadership of Airbus Defence and Space.

On the 2019 summit, the countries agreed to take a joint effort on supporting research on breakthrough technologies. A network for artificial intelligence shall be created by the Agentur für Sprunginnovationen (leap innovation board) to establish a European Innovation Council (see Horizon 2020 and the discussion on the underfunded Horizon Europe project). The bilateral Aachen Treaty on further Franco-German integration efforts was endorsed which includes additional funding for the Youth Office (DFJW / OFAJ). The Franco-German Main Ground Combat System shall support the developments of the European PESCO Project on Security and Defence. The 2019 goals were emphasized in 2021 ensuring additional funding for military and cultural projects. New institutions include the Deutsch-Französische Bürgerfonds (Franco-German Citizen Fund - enabling sister-city arrangements) in 2020, the Deutsch-Französische Ausschuss für grenzüberschreitende Zusammenarbeit (Franco-German committee for cross-border cooperation - constituted when borders were closed during the pandemic) in 2020, and the Deutsch-Französische Zukunftswerk (Franco-German Future Workshop - analysing progressive movements) in 2020. Additionally the declaration mentions the support for the IPCEI groups (Important Project of Common European Interest) which is funding strategic industry projects in core Europe.

== Timeline ==
The joint ministerial meeting of the 22. January 2003 in Paris is counted as the 1. Franco-German Ministerial Council.

- 2. Deutsch-Französischer Ministerrat, 18 September 2003 in Berlin
- 3. Deutsch-Französischer Ministerrat, 13 May 2004 in Paris
- 4. Deutsch-Französischer Ministerrat, 26 October 2004 in Berlin
- 5. Deutsch-Französischer Ministerrat, 26 April 2005 in Paris
- 6. Deutsch-Französischer Ministerrat, 14 March 2006 in Berlin
- 7. Deutsch-Französischer Ministerrat, 12 October 2006 in Paris
- 8. Deutsch-Französischer Ministerrat, 12 November 2007 in Berlin
- 9. Deutsch-Französischer Ministerrat, 9. June 2008 in Straubing (D)
- 10. Deutsch-Französischer Ministerrat, 24 November 2008 in Paris
- 11. Deutsch-Französischer Ministerrat, 12 March 2009 in Berlin
- 12. Deutsch-Französischer Ministerrat, 4 February 2010 in Paris
- 13. Deutsch-Französischer Ministerrat, 10 December 2010 in Freiburg (D)
- 14. Deutsch-Französischer Ministerrat, 6 February 2012 in Paris
- 15. Deutsch-Französischer Ministerrat, 22 January 2013 in Berlin
- 16. Deutsch-Französischer Ministerrat, 19 February 2014 in Paris
- 17. Deutsch-Französischer Ministerrat, 31 March 2015 in Berlin
- 18. Deutsch-Französischer Ministerrat, 7 April 2016 in Metz (F)
- 19. Deutsch-Französischer Ministerrat, 13 July 2017 in Paris
- 20. Deutsch-Französischer Ministerrat, 19 June 2018 in Gransee (D), Schloss Meseberg
- 21. Deutsch-Französischer Ministerrat, 16 October 2019 in Toulouse (F)
- 22. Deutsch-Französischer Ministerrat, 31 May 2021 as video teleconferences (Berlin/Paris)
- 24. Deutsch-Französischer Ministerrat, 22 January 2023 in Paris

Due to federal elections in Germany the meetings were skipped in autumn 2005, autumn 2009 and autumn 2013. Due to the presidential election and parliamentary election in France in Spring 2017, the annual council was moved to July 2017.

The 2013 meeting was held on 22 January 2013 in Berlin alongside the 50th anniversary of the Élysée Treaty with a joint ministerial council and a joint parliamentary assembly of the French National Assembly and the German Bundestag at the Reichstag building in Berlin.

Due to the corona crisis the meeting for 2020 was cancelled and the meeting for 2021 was held only using teleconferences. The planned meeting for 2022 in Fontainbleau was moved to 2023 at short notice as the Ukraine crisis did not allow biliteral preparations to come to consensual positions.

== Trivia ==
There is no official English title of the conference as all documents are handled in French and German only. The writers of the foreign minister in Germany choose Franco-German Council of Ministers in summary notes. Reports being handed over from the working groups to the EU have chosen Franco-German Ministerial Council being a more direct (word by word) translation. The meeting themselves are referred to as the annual Franco-German Summit.

Similarly the created institutions do only have official names in German and French. English names can be derived from international press briefings of the French or German government or when the institutions are referenced in documents of the European Union. There may be differences in the translations in the beginning until a common name is established.
