= List of international prime ministerial trips made by Edi Rama =

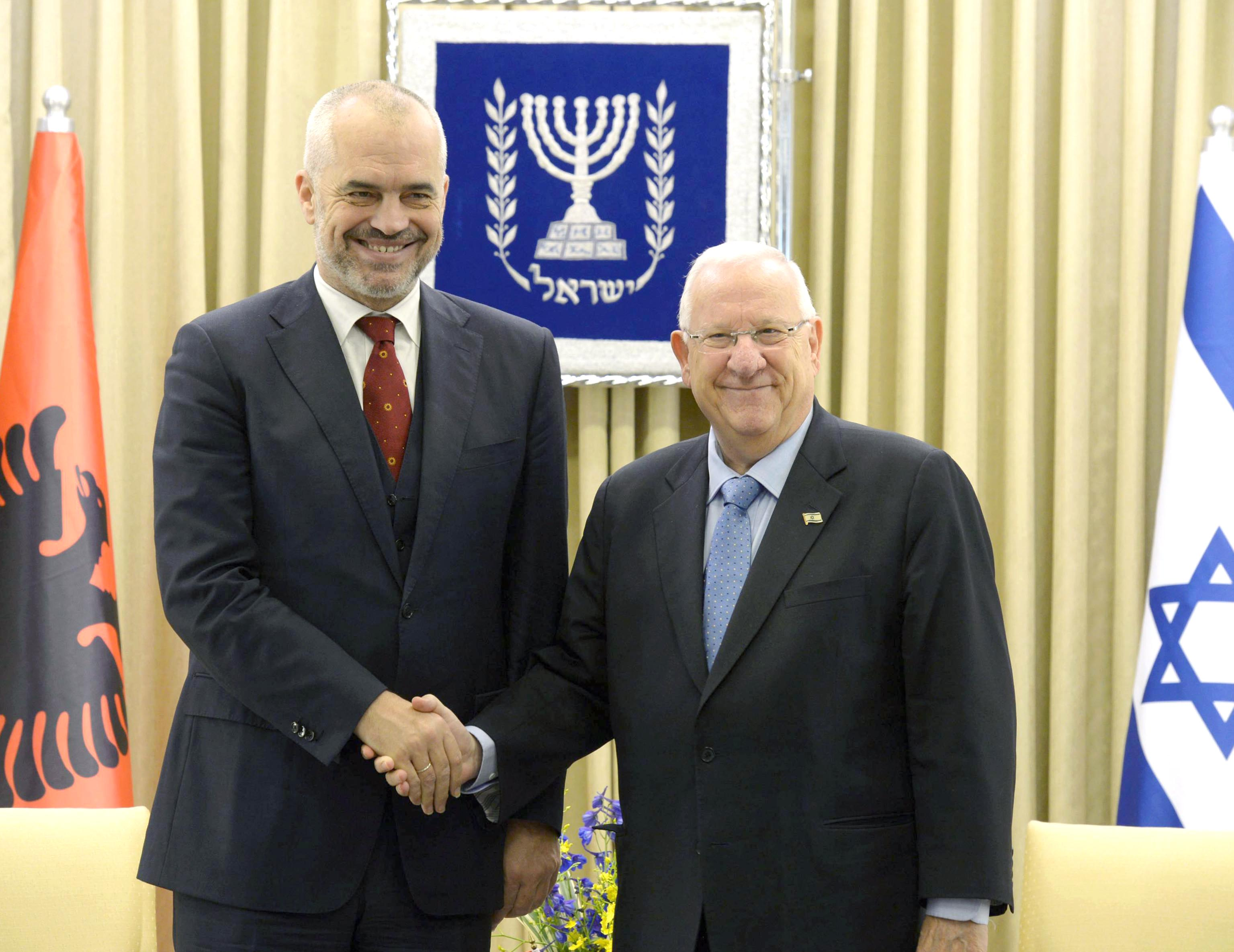
Rama with Reuven Rivlin in Israel, December 2015.

This is a list of official trips made by Edi Rama as the 33rd Prime Minister of the Republic of Albania.

== 2013 ==
The following international trips were made by Prime Minister Edi Rama in 2013:

Country	Areas visited	Date	Details
Kosovo	Pristina	13 September	Prime Minister Rama state visit to Kosovo was his first trip outside Albania as Prime Minister. Rama chose neighboring Kosovo as the first foreign trip of his office in a demonstration of the historic and strategic ties between the two countries. Rama was welcomed by Prime Minister of Kosovo, Hashim Thaçi.
Belgium	Brussels	17 September	Rama travelled to Brussels to attend the European Commission focused on the following steps of Albania into the European Union and on the state of play of the country's commitment to reform in the light of this process. Rama met the President of the European Commission, José Manuel Barroso and the Member of the European Commission in charge of Enlargement and European Neighbourhood Policy, Štefan Füle.
United States	New York City	21–23 September	Rama flew to New York City to attend the United Nations General Assembly. Edi Rama met Hillary and Bill Clinton upon their invitation.
Kosovo	Pristina; Prizren	23 October	Rama and Prime Minister of Turkey, Recep Tayyip Erdoğan was invited by the Prime Minister of Kosovo, Hashim Thaçi to attend the open ceremony of the Terminal of Pristina International Airport.
(North Macedonia) Macedonia	Skopje	5 November	Rama travelled to Macedonia on his first state visit to the country upon the invitation of Prime Minister of Macedonia, Nikola Gruevski. He also met the President of Macedonia, George Ivanov, the Speaker of the Parliament of Macedonia, Trajko Veljanovski and the two leader of the Albanian parties in Macedonia Ali Ahmeti (BDI) and Menduh Thaçi (PDSH).
Montenegro	Podgorica	14 November	Rama travelled to Montenegro on his first state visit to the country. Rama was invited by the Prime Minister of Montenegro, Milo Đukanović and met the President of Montenegro, Filip Vujanović. Rama visited the city of Tuzi, where the majority is Albanian.
United Kingdom	London	20 November	Rama travelled to London to meet the Prime Minister of United Kingdom, David Cameron focused on the integration of Albania into the European Union and the economical relations between the United Kingdom and Albania.
Austria	Vienna	25 November	Rama travelled to Austria on his first state visit to the country met the President of Austria, Heinz Fischer and to attend the 2013 Vienna Economic Forum.
Italy	Rome; Bari	12 December	Rama participated to a bilateral meeting in Rome with the Prime Minister of Italy, Enrico Letta, focused on the economical, and cultural relations between both countries.
Azerbaijan	Baku	16–17 December	Rama travelled to Azerbaijan on his first state visit to the country met the Ministry of Energy of Azerbaijan, Natig Aliyev. Rama was invited to attend a ceremony to sign final investment document on Shahdeniz-2. (See also: Albania-Azerbaijan relations)
Israel	Jerusalem	21 December	Rama participated to a bilateral meeting in Jerusalem with the Prime Minister of Israel, Benjamin Netanyahu. Rama and Netanyahu signed a declaration of friendship to mark the 25th anniversary of the establishment of diplomatic relations.

== 2014 ==
The following international trips were made by Prime Minister Edi Rama in 2014:

Country	Areas visited	Date	Details
Italy	Rome	1–2 February	Rama participated to a bilateral meeting in Rome with the Prime Minister of Italy, Enrico Letta, focused on the economical, and cultural relations between both countries.
Germany	Berlin	1 April	Rama flew to Germany upon the invitation of Chancellor of Germany, Angela Merkel, focused on the bilateral relations between both countries.
Qatar	Doha	14 April	Rama flew to Qatar on his first state visit to the country upon the invitation of Prime Minister of Qatar, Khalifa Al Thani focused on the bilateral relations of Albania and Qatar.
(Holy See) Vatican; Italy	Vatican City; Rome	24 April	Rama travelled to Vatican on his first state visit to the country upon the invitation of the Pope Francis.
Kazakhstan	Astana	24 May	Rama flew to Kazakhstan on his first state visit to the country upon the invitation of President of Kazakhstan, Nursultan Nazarbayev focused on the economic relations of Albania and Kazakhstan.
Netherlands	Amsterdam	26 May	Rama travelled to the Netherlands to attend a bilateral meeting upon the invitation of Minister of Foreign Affairs, Frans Timmermans.
France	Paris	11 June	Rama travelled to France on his state visit to the country upon the invitation of President of France, François Hollande focused on the integration of Albania into the European Union and the bilateral relations of Albania and France.
Germany	Berlin	28 August	Rama travelled to Germany to attend the 2014 Western Balkans summit in Berlin.
Croatia	Zagreb	26 August	Rama flew to Croatia to attend a bilateral meeting with Prime Minister of Croatia, Zoran Milanović, Prime Minister of Montenegro, Milo Djukanovic and Prime Minister of Bosnia and Herzegovina, Vjekoslav Bevanda and as well focused on their friendly relations.
(United Kingdom) Wales; NATO	Newport	4 September	Rama travelled to Wales to attend the 2014 Wales summit of the North Atlantic Treaty Organization (NATO).
China	Beijing	10–11 September	Rama travelled to China to attend a bilateral meeting with Prime Minister of China, Li Keqiang.
Italy	Rome	1–2 February	Rama participated to a bilateral meeting for the second time in 2014 in Rome with the Prime Minister of Italy, Enrico Letta, focused on the economical, and cultural relations between Albania and Italy.
Serbia	Belgrade	10 November	Prime Minister Rama travelled to Serbia on his first official state visit to the country upon the invitation of Prime Minister of Serbia, Aleksandar Vučić. Rama was pursuing a historical reconciliation policy between Albanians and Serbs and his visit in Belgrade. It was the first visit of an Albanian Prime Minister in Serbia in over 70 years.
Sweden	Stockholm	14 November	Rama flew to Sweden to attend a bilateral meeting with Prime Minister of Sweden, Stefan Löfven.
Kuwait	Kuwait City	19–20 November	Rama travelled to Kuwait on his state visit to the country to attend a bilateral meeting with ruler Sabah Al-Ahmad Al-Jaber Al-Sabah and other Kuwaiti politicians.

== 2015 ==
The following international trips were made by Prime Minister Edi Rama in 2015:

Country	Areas visited	Date	Details
United Kingdom	London	18 January	Rama was invited to attend the Potential Monuments of Unrealised Futures (Albanian: Monumente të Mundshëm Ardhmërisht të Parealizuara) exhibition at the Architectural Association School of Architecture of Albanian artists Edi Hila and Adrian Paci.
France	Paris	11 January	Rama was invited to attend the Republican marches to honour the victims of the Charlie Hebdo shooting, with the leaders of the Sunni, Orthodox, Bektashi, and Catholic communities of Albania.
United Arab Emirates	Dubai	14–16 April	Rama travelled to the United Arab Emirates to participate to a bilateral meeting with the Head of the Dubai Council, Mohammad Al-Murr and the Deputy Prime Minister of the United Arab Emirates, Sheikh Mansour.
Romania	Bucharest	11 June	Rama participated to a bilateral meeting in Romania with the Prime Minister of Romania, Victor Ponta focused on the economical, and cultural relations between both countries and the recognition of Kosovo.
Austria	Vienna	27 August	Rama travelled to Austria to attend the 2015 Western Balkans summit in Vienna.
United States	New York City	24–29 September	Rama flew to New York City to attend the 2015 World Leadership Forum as well as the 2015 Columbia University World Leader Forum.
Czech Republic	Prague	13 October	Rama travelled to the Czech Republic on his first state visit to the country upon the invitation of Prime Minister of the Czech Republic, Bohuslav Sobotka.
China	Suzhou	24 November	Rama flew to China to attend the 2015 summit of China and Central and Eastern European Countries in Suzhou.
Turkey	Istanbul	18–20 November	Rama travelled to Turkey to attend the 2015 Atlantic Council Energy and Economic summit in Istanbul.
China	Hong Kong	27 October	Rama participated to a bilateral meeting in Hong Kong with the Chief Executive of Hong Kong, Leung Chun-ying. Rama also was invited to attend the Economic Forum of Albania and China.
France	Paris	3 December	Rama travelled to France on his state visit to the country upon the invitation of Prime Minister of France, Manuel Valls focused on the bilateral relations of Albania and France.

== 2016 ==
The following international trips were made by Prime Minister Edi Rama in 2016:

Country	Areas visited	Date	Details
United States	Washington, D.C.	13–14 April	Rama travelled to on hist state visit to the country upon the invitation of President of the United States, Barack Obama and Vice President of the United States, Joe Biden.
France	Paris	30 May	Rama travelled to on hist state visit to the country, where he met the President of France, François Hollande.
Turkey	Ankara	28 June	Rama travelled to Turkey on his state visit to the country upon the invitation of President of Turkey, Recep Tayyip Erdoğan, focused on the strong bilateral relations between both countries.
France	Paris	4 July	Rama travelled to France to attend the 2016 Western Balkans summit in Paris.
Poland; NATO	Warsaw	8–9 July	Rama travelled to Poland to attend the 2016 Warsaw summit of the North Atlantic Treaty Organization (NATO).
Slovenia	Ljubljana	5 September	Rama flew to Slovenia on his state visit to the country upon the invitation of Prime Minister of Slovenia, Miro Cerar, focused on the strong bilateral relations between both countries and as well the integration of Albania into the European Union.
Serbia	Belgrade	14–15 October	Rama flew to Serbia on his state visit to the country upon the invitation of Prime Minister of Serbia, Aleksandar Vučić and to attend the 2016 Belgrade Security Forum.
Germany	Berlin	28 November	Rama travelled to Germany on his state visit to the country upon the invitation of Chancellor of Germany, Angela Merkel, focused on the strong bilateral relations between both countries and as well the integration of Albania into the European Union.

== 2017 ==
The following international trips were made by Prime Minister Edi Rama in 2017:

Country	Areas visited	Date	Details
Singapore	Singapore	18 January	Rama flew to Singapore on his official state visit to the country meeting the Prime Minister of Singapore, Lee Hsien Loong, focused on the bilateral relations of both countries and the International recognition of Kosovo.
Kosovo	Pristina	2 February	Rama travelled to Kosovo on his official state visit to the country where he met the Prime Minister of Kosovo, Isa Mustafa.
Bosnia and Herzegovina	Sarajevo	16 March	Rama travelled to Bosnia and Herzegovina to attend the Western Balkans Six Leaders Summit in Sarajevo.
France	Paris	29 March	Prime Minister Rama travelled to France on his state visit to the country, where he met Prime Minister of France, Bernard Cazeneuve focused on the bilateral relations between Albania and France. Both have signed a series of agreements elevating the framework of bilateral cooperation. Edi Rama received the order of the "Commander to the Legion of Honour", the highest French Honour by President of France, François Hollande.
Montenegro	Podgorica	3 April	Rama travelled to Montenegro on his state visit to the country, where he met Prime Minister of Montenegro, Duško Marković focused on the bilateral relations between the two countries as well as Albania's support as a member of the North Atlantic Treaty Organization on Montenegro's integration into the NATO.
Switzerland	Bern	6 April	Rama participated to a bilateral meeting in Bern with the President of Switzerland, Doris Leuthard, focused on the economical, and cultural relations between both countries. The two countries celebrated the 25th anniversary of intensely collaboration.
Belgium; NATO	Brussels	25 May	Rama travelled to Belgium to attend the 2017 Brussels summit of the North Atlantic Treaty Organization (NATO).
Turkey	Istanbul	9–10 July	Rama flew to Turkey to attend the 2017 World Petroleum Congress. Rama also meet the President of Turkey, Recep Tayyip Erdoğan.
Italy	Trieste	12 July	Rama travelled to Italy to attend the 2017 Western Balkans summit in Trieste.
Montenegro	Podgorica	2 August	Rama travelled to Montenegro to attend the 2017 Adriatic Charter summit in Podgorica.
France	Paris	1–2 September	Prime Minister Rama travelled to France on his state visit to the country, where he met President of France, Emmanuel Macron focused on the bilateral relations between Albania and France. He also attend the 2017 Global Positive Forum in Paris.
United States	New York City	18–25 September	Prime Minister Rama travelled to the United States to attend the 72nd Session of the United Nations General Assembly.

== 2018 ==
The following international trips were made by Prime Minister Edi Rama in 2018:

Country	Areas visited	Date	Details
Germany	Berlin	25–26 April	Prime Minister Rama met with German Chancellor Angela Merkel to discuss Albania's EU integration process and seek German support for opening EU accession negotiations.
United Kingdom	London	9–10 July	Prime Minister Rama attended the 2018 Western Balkans summit in London.
Belgium; NATO	Brussels	11–12 July	Prime Minister Rama attended the 29th NATO summit held at NATO Headquarters.

== 2019 ==
The following international trips were made by Prime Minister Edi Rama in 2019:

Country	Areas visited	Dates	Details	Ref.
Monaco	Monaco	April 9–10	Prime Minister Rama paid an official visit to Monaco at the invitation of Prince Albert II, where he met with the Prince and was awarded the Grand Officer of the Order of Saint-Charles.	
Qatar	Doha	April 15–16	Rama made an official visit to Qatar, meeting with Emir Sheikh Tamim bin Hamad Al Thani and Qatari business leaders to discuss bilateral cooperation and encourage investment in Albania.	
United Kingdom; NATO	London, Watford	December 3–4	Rama travelled to Watford to attend the 30th NATO summit.	

== 2020 ==
The following international trips were made by Prime Minister Edi Rama in 2020:

Country	Areas visited	Dates	Details	Ref.
Austria	Vienna	January 9	Prime Minister Rama visited Vienna to present Albania's priorities for its 2020 Chairmanship of the OSCE to the Permanent Council.	
Ukraine	Kyiv	January 20–21	In his capacity as OSCE Chairperson-in-Office, Rama made his first official visit to Ukraine, meeting with President Volodymyr Zelenskyy and other high-level officials to discuss conflict resolution efforts in eastern Ukraine.	
Belgium	Brussels	January 29	Rama visited NATO Headquarters in Brussels, where he met with NATO Secretary General Jens Stoltenberg to discuss regional security, defense spending, and Albania's contribution to the alliance.	

== 2021 ==
The following international trips were made by Prime Minister Edi Rama in 2021:

Country	Areas visited	Dates	Details	Image
Belgium; NATO	Brussels	13–14 June	Rama travelled to Brussels to attend the 31st NATO summit.	
Kosovo	Pristina	27 September	Met with Prime Minister Albin Kurti and opposition party leaders, against the background of a dangerous escalation with Serbia over car plates.	
United Kingdom	Glasgow	1–2 November	Attended the COP26 Conference.	
Vatican City	Vatican City	27 November	Met with Pope Francis to discuss strong bilateral ties, Church–State cooperation, migration, peace, and regional issues including Western Balkans and EU integration progress.	

== 2022 ==
The following international trips were made by Prime Minister Edi Rama in 2022:

Country	Areas visited	Dates	Details
United States	Washington, D.C.	15 February	Met with Antony Blinken
Germany	Munich	18–20 February	Attended the 58th Munich Security Conference.
Belgium	Brussels	23–24 March	Rama travelled to Brussels to attend the extraordinary NATO summit to discuss the Russian invasion of Ukraine.
Germany	Berlin	10–12 April	He first met with Berlin Mayor Franziska Giffey and then President Frank-Walter Steinmeier. Met with Chancellor Olaf Scholz.
Ukraine	Kyiv	15 June	Together with Montenegrin Prime Minister Dritan Abazović held talks with Ukrainian President Volodymyr Zelenskyy. Montenegro and Albania supported anti-Russian sanctions following the European Union, and the former recently refused to allow a plane carrying Russian Foreign Minister Sergei Lavrov to pass through its airspace. The Prime Minister of North Macedonia was also invited to visit Ukraine, but he declined "due to a busy schedule."
Belgium	Brussels	23 June	Attended in Brussels an EU-Western Balkans Leaders meeting.
Spain; NATO	Madrid	28–30 June	Rama travelled to Madrid to attend the 32nd NATO summit.
Czech Republic	Prague	6 October	Rama travelled to Prague to attend the inaugural meeting of the European Political Community.
Germany	Berlin	3 November	Attended Western Balkans Summit.

== 2023 ==
The following international trips were made by Prime Minister Edi Rama in 2023:

Country	Areas visited	Dates	Details	Image
Germany	Munich	17–19 February	Attended the 59th Munich Security Conference.	
Japan	Tokyo	22 February	He held a Summit Meeting with Prime Minister Fumio Kishida.	
Germany	Berlin	7 March	He visited for talks with German Chancellor Olaf Scholz at the German Chancellery. The leaders discussed Albania's role as host of the 2023 Berlin Process Summit, European Union enlargement, and Albania's EU accession process. They also exchanged views on regional cooperation in the Western Balkans and Germany's continued support for Albania's European integration. The meeting also covered the normalisation of relations between Kosovo and Serbia, the implementation of agreements on the Common Regional Market, and bilateral cooperation between Albania and Germany. Following the talks, Rama and Scholz held a joint press conference.	
United Kingdom	London	23 March	Met with Prime Minister Rishi Sunak.	
Iceland	Reykjavík	16–17 May	Rama attended the 4th Council of Europe summit.	
Moldova	Chișinău, Bulboaca	1 June	Rama attended the second summit of the European Political Community.	
Lithuania; NATO	Vilnius	11–12 July	Rama travelled to Vilnius to attend the 33rd NATO summit.	
Spain	Granada	5 October	Rama attended the third summit of the European Political Community. Met with Prime Minister Rishi Sunak.	

== 2024 ==
The following international trips were made by Prime Minister Edi Rama in 2024:

Country	Areas visited	Dates	Details
North Macedonia	Skopje	21–22 January	Attended Western Balkan Summit.
Spain	Madrid	23–24 January	Rama met with Prime Minister Pedro Sánchez to promote Albania at the FITUR 2024 international tourism fair and meet with Spanish officials. Highlighting the "Albania All Senses" campaign, Rama focused on attracting investment for luxury tourism and noted a 26% increase in Spanish tourists in 2023. Details of the visit, including the meeting with Prime Minister Pedro Sánchez and the presentation at FITUR, can be found in the report at Balkanweb.
Germany	Munich	16–18 February	Attended 60th Munich Security Conference.
United States; NATO	Washington, D.C.	9–11 July	Prime Minister Rama attended the 33rd summit of NATO held in Washington, D.C., United States, alongside other heads of government from the organization.
United Kingdom	Woodstock	18 July	Rama attended the 4th European Political Community Summit.
France	Paris	26 July	Rama travelled to Paris to attend the 2024 Summer Olympics opening ceremony.
Croatia	Dubrovnik	9 October	Addressed the third Ukraine-South East Europe summit.
Germany	Berlin	14 October	Attended Western Balkans Summit.
Hungary	Budapest	7 November	Rama attended the 5th European Political Community Summit.

== 2025 ==
The following international trips were made by Prime Minister Edi Rama in 2025:

Country	Areas visited	Dates	Details
Germany	Munich	14–16 February	Attended 61st Munich Security Conference
Netherlands; NATO	The Hague	24–25 June	Rama attended the 2025 NATO summit.
Belgium	Brussels	17 September	Rama travelled to NATO headquarters to meet with Secretary General Mark Rutte.
Denmark	Copenhagen	2 October	Attended the 7th European Political Community Summit.
France	Paris	29–30 October	Attended Paris Peace Forum.

== 2026 ==
Country	Location(s)	Dates	Details
France	Paris	6 January	Rama attended the Coalition of the Willing meeting in Paris with fellow leaders.
Italy	Rome	16 April	Met with Prime Minister Giorgia Meloni at the Palazzo Chigi for a one-on-one meeting. The meeting highlighted strengthened bilateral ties and coordination on common regional and European affairs.
Spain	Barcelona	17 April	Met with Prime Minister Pedro Sánchez and European Council President António Costa. The visit includes participation in the fourth “In Defence of Democracy” summit.
Armenia	Yerevan	3–4 May	Rama attended the 8th European Political Community Summit.
Estonia	Tallinn	15 May	Rama visited Tallinn to participate in the Lennart Meri Conference 2026, where he joined discussions on transatlantic cooperation, NATO, global security challenges, and Ukraine’s role in the European security architecture. He also held bilateral talks with Estonian Prime Minister Kristen Michal and met with President Alar Karis. The visit included engagements at the NATO Cooperative Cyber Defence Centre of Excellence, the e-Estonia Briefing Centre, and the Maarjamäe Memorial, with discussions focusing on cyber security, digital governance, and cooperation within NATO and the European Union.
South Korea	Seoul	17–21 May	Rama visited Seoul met with Prime Minister Kim Min-seok focused on strengthening bilateral cooperation in security and defense, new technologies, and digitalization.
Montenegro	Tivat	5 June	Attended the EU–Western Balkans Summit. Met with Dutch Prine Minister Rob Jetten.
Turkey; NATO	Ankara	7–8 July	Rama attended the 2026 Ankara NATO summit.
France	Paris	13–14 July	Rama travelled to Paris to attend a meeting with heads of state and government within the Coalition of the Willing. Rama attended Bastille Day celebrations.
United States	New York City	22-27 September	Rama attended the 81th United Nations General Assembly.
Ireland	Dublin	12 November	Rama attended the 9th European Political Community Summit.

== Future trips ==
Country	Location	Date	Details
Turkey	Antalya	11–12 November	Rama is scheduled to attend the 2026 United Nations Climate Change Conference.
Cambodia	Phnom Penh	15–16 November	Rama is scheduled to attend the 20th Organisation internationale de la Francophonie summit.

== Multilateral meetings ==
Edi Rama participated in the following summits during his premiership:

Group	Year															
Group	2013	2014	2015	2016	2017	2018	2019	2020	2021	2022	2023	2024	2025	2026	2027	2028
NATO	None	4–5 September (United Kingdom) Newport	None	8–9 July (Poland) Warsaw	25 May (Belgium) Brussels	11–12 July (Belgium) Brussels	3–4 December (United Kingdom) Watford	None	14 June (Belgium) Brussels	24 March (Belgium) Brussels	11–12 July (Lithuania) Vilnius	9–11 July (United States) Washington, D.C.	24–25 June (Netherlands) The Hague	7–8 July (Turkey) Ankara	TBD (Albania) Tirana	TBA
NATO	None	4–5 September (United Kingdom) Newport	None	8–9 July (Poland) Warsaw	25 May (Belgium) Brussels	11–12 July (Belgium) Brussels	3–4 December (United Kingdom) Watford	None	14 June (Belgium) Brussels	28–30 June (Spain) Madrid	11–12 July (Lithuania) Vilnius	9–11 July (United States) Washington, D.C.	24–25 June (Netherlands) The Hague	7–8 July (Turkey) Ankara	TBD (Albania) Tirana	TBA
EPC	Didn't exist									6 October (Czech Republic) Prague	1 June (Moldova) Bulboaca	18 July (United Kingdom) Woodstock	16 May (Albania) Tirana	4 May (Armenia) Yerevan	TBD (Switzerland) TBD	TBD (Azerbaijan) TBD
EPC	Didn't exist									6 October (Czech Republic) Prague	5 October (Spain) Granada	7 November (Hungary) Budapest	2 October (Denmark) Copenhagen	12 November (Republic of Ireland) Dublin	TBD (Greece) TBD	TBD (Latvia) TBD
OIF	None	29–30 October (Senegal) Dakar	None	26–27 November (Madagascar) Antananarivo	None	11–12 October (Armenia) Yerevan	None			19–20 November (Tunisia) Djerba	None	4–5 October (France) Villers-Cotterêts	None	TBD; Cambodia	TBA	TBA
██ = Future event.

== See also ==
- Foreign relations of Albania
- Prime Minister of Albania
- Politics of Albania
