= List of international prime ministerial trips made by Dimitar Kovačevski =

This is a list of international prime ministerial trips made by Dimitar Kovačevski, who served as the Prime Minister of North Macedonia from 16 January 2022 to 28 January 2024.

== Summary ==
Kovačevski has visited 14 countries during his tenure as prime minister. The number of visits per country where Kovačevski has traveled are:

- One visit to Bulgaria, Czech Republic, Estonia, Greece, Iceland, Italy, Lithuania, Moldova, Spain, the United States and Vatican City
- Two visits to Belgium
- Three visits to Albania and Germany

== 2022 ==
Country	Location(s)	Dates	Details
Bulgaria	Sofia	24–25 January	Met with Prime Minister Kiril Petkov in Sofia, where the two sides signed several memoranda of understanding aimed at strengthening bilateral cooperation between Bulgaria and North Macedonia. The agreements focused on economic development, infrastructure connectivity, including the Sofia–Skopje railway, and cooperation in areas such as agriculture and support for small and medium-sized enterprises.
Belgium	Brussels	24 March	Kovačevski attended an extraordinary NATO summit.
Italy	Rome	22–23 May	Met with his prime minister Mario Draghi, as well as with a delegation from Bulgaria led by Prime Minister Kiril Petkov.
Vatican City	Vatican City	23 May	Met with Pope Francis.
Belgium	Brussels	23 June	Attended in Brussels an EU-Western Balkans Leaders meeting.
Czech Republic	Prague	6 October	Kovačevski travelled to Prague to attend the inaugural meeting of the European Political Community.
Germany	Berlin	3 November	Attended Western Balkans Summit.
Albania	Tirana	6 December	Attended EU-Western Balkans summit.

== 2023 ==
Country	Location(s)	Dates	Details
Germany	Munich	17–19 February	Attended the 59th Munich Security Conference.
United States	Washington, D. C.	8 May	Met with Secretary Antony Blinken. They exchanged views on the bilateral relations between North Macedonia and the US, as well as on the situation in the region.
Iceland	Reykjavík	16–17 May	Kovačevski attended the 4th Council of Europe summit.
Moldova	Mimi Castle, Bulboaca, Chișinău	1 June	Kovačevski travelled to Moldova to attend the 2nd European Political Community Summit.
Germany	Berlin	28 June	He visited for talks with Chancellor Olaf Scholz. The leaders discussed North Macedonia's accession to the European Union, with Scholz reaffirming Germany's strong support for opening accession negotiations and stating that no new bilateral conditions from Bulgaria should be imposed beyond the agreed negotiating framework. The meeting also covered bilateral relations, regional cooperation in the Western Balkans, the impact of Russia's invasion of Ukraine, energy security, and cooperation within NATO. Following the talks, Kovačevski and Scholz held a joint press conference, where they emphasized the importance of advancing North Macedonia's European integration.
Lithuania	Vilnius	11–12 July	Kovačevski attended the NATO summit.
Albania	Tirana	17 July	Met with Prime Minister Edi Rama and Prime Minister of Montenegro, Dritan Abazović and Prime Minister of Serbia, Ana Brnabić. The focus of the meeting was on the Berlin Process summit that will be held in Albania in the fall, as well as the New Financial and Economic Support Plan of the EU for the Western Balkans.
Greece	Athens	21 August	Attended Ukraine-South East Europe summit.
Estonia	Tallinn	5 September	Attended Tallinn Digital Summit. Met with Prime Minister Kaja Kallas.
Spain	Granada	5 October	Kovačevski attended the 3rd European Political Community Summit.
Albania	Tirana	16 October	Attended Western Balkans Summit.

== Multilateral meetings ==
Dimitar Kovačevski participated in the following summits during his premiership:

Group	Year	
Group	2022	2023
NATO	24 March, (Belgium) Brussels	11–12 July, (Lithuania) Vilnius
NATO	28–30 June^{[a]}, (Spain) Madrid	11–12 July, (Lithuania) Vilnius
EPC	6 October, (Czech Republic) Prague	1 June, (Moldova) Bulboaca
EPC	6 October, (Czech Republic) Prague	5 October, (Spain) Granada
Berlin Process	3 November, (Germany) Berlin	16 October, (Albania) Tirana
██ = Did not attend / participate.^aPresident Stevo Pendarovski attended in the prime minister's place.
