= 2018 Western Balkans Summit, London =

Western Balkans Summit "London Balkans 2018"
- Participating non-EU states Participating EU states Rest of the EU
- Host country: United Kingdom
- Dates: 9–10 July 2018
- Cities: United Kingdom London
- Participants: European Union; Albania; Austria; Bosnia and Herzegovina; Croatia; Germany; Greece; Italy; Kosovo; France; (North Macedonia) Republic of Macedonia; Montenegro; Serbia; Slovenia; United Kingdom
- Chair: Theresa May
- Follows: 2017 Western Balkans Summit, Trieste
- Precedes: 2019 Western Balkans Summit, Poznań

Key points

The 2018 Western Balkans Summit in London, United Kingdom, was the fifth annual summit within the Berlin Process initiative for European integration of Western Balkans states. The summit took place on 9–10 July. Previous summits took place in Berlin in 2014, Vienna in 2015, Paris in 2016 and Trieste in 2017. Heads of government, foreign ministers and the ministers of economy of Albania, Bosnia and Herzegovina, Kosovo, Republic of Macedonia, Montenegro, Serbia, as well as EU member states from the region Croatia, Slovenia and EU member states such as the United Kingdom, Austria, France, Germany, Italy as well as representatives of the European Union and the International Financial Institutions attended the summit.

By hosting the summit in London, the United Kingdom demonstrated its continued interest and involvement in the stability of the region beyond its imminent exit from the EU.

== Proposed agenda ==
Andrew Page, the Summit's coordinator, stated that the priorities of the summit are to be economic stability, interconnectivity, infrastructure, employment opportunities, and digital transformation. The UK's government stated the three main objectives were increasing economic stability, strengthening regional security co-operation, and facilitating political cooperation.

== Issues addressed ==
According to a press release from the government of the United Kingdom, the summit focused on three areas.

The issues primarily discussed included increasing economic stability within the scope of improving the business environment, promoting entrepreneurship, curbing youth unemployment, and promoting regional inter-connectivity. Also on the table was strengthening regional security co-operation to help tackle common threats, including corruption, serious and organised crime, trafficking of people, drugs and firearms, and terrorism and violent extremism. The final topic was facilitating political cooperation to consolidate democracy in the region and resolve disputes from the breakup of Yugoslavia and Kosovo declaration of independence.

== 2019 Western Balkans Summit ==
Participants agreed on the Western Balkan's eventual path into the EU and agreed the next Berlin Process Summit would take place in Poland in 2019.

== See also ==
- Berlin Process
- Southeast Europe
- Stabilisation and Association Process
- Central European Free Trade Agreement
- Stability Pact for South Eastern Europe
