= List of international prime ministerial trips made by Albin Kurti =

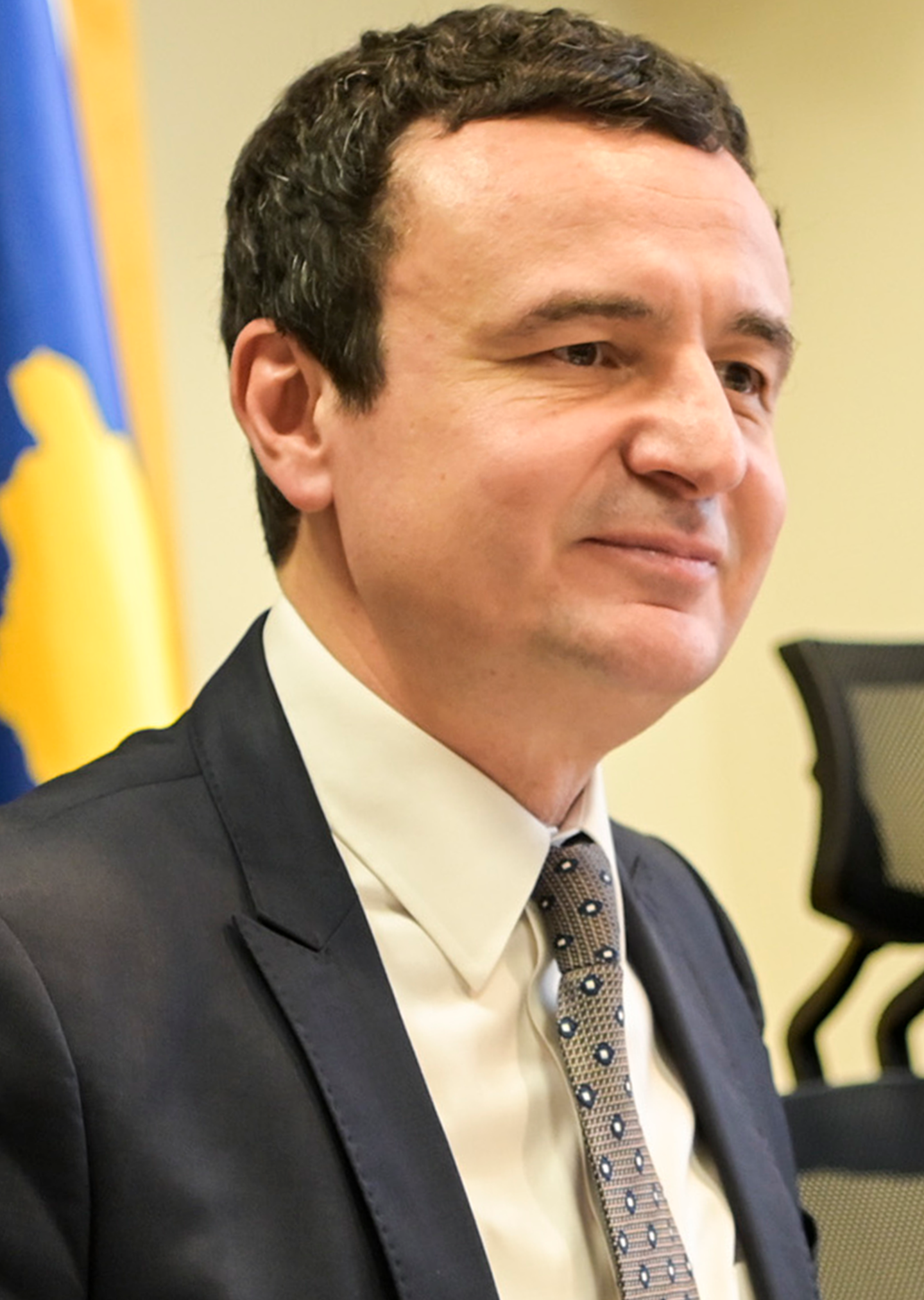
Albin Kurti is the incumbent prime minister of Kosovo since his inauguration on 22 March 2021.

Since 22 March 2021, Albin Kurti has served as the incumbent prime minister of Kosovo.

== Summary ==
The number of visits per country where Prime Minister Kurti traveled as per 25 May 2025 are:

- One visit to Bosnia and Herzegovina, Bulgaria, Czech Republic, Estonia, Ireland, Italy, Japan, Montenegro, Norway, Poland, Slovakia and South Korea
- Two visits to Albania, Croatia, Greece, Slovenia and Vatican City
- Three visits to Austria and North Macedonia
- Four visits to Switzerland and Turkey
- Six visits to Belgium, France, Germany and the United States
- Seven visits to the United Kingdom

== List ==
#	Country	Date	Cities visited	Type of visit
1	Albania	11 February 2020	Tirana	Official visit
2	Germany	14 February 2020	Munich	Munich Security Conference
3	United Kingdom	24 February 2020	London	European Bank for Reconstruction and Development
4	Belgium	28 April 2021	Brussels	Official visit
5	European Union	15 June 2021	Brussels	Belgrade–Pristina negotiations
6	France	23 June 2021	Paris	Meeting with Emmanuel Macron
7	Croatia	25 July 2021	Zagreb	Meeting the wounded on the bus crash on Slavonski Brod
8	Slovenia	1 September 2021	Bled	16th Bled Strategic Forum
9	North Macedonia	16 September 2021	Skopje	Official visit
10	Austria	23 November 2021	Vienna	Official visit
11	Germany	18–21 February 2022	Munich	Munich Security Conference
12	United Kingdom	28 February 2022	London	Western Balkans Investment Summit 2022
13	Turkey	12 March 2022	Antalya	Antalya Diplomacy Forum
14	Norway	27–29 March 2022	Oslo	Official visit
15	Greece	6–9 April 2022	Athens	Delphi Economic Forum
16	United States	26–29 April 2022	Washington, D.C.	Funeral ceremony of Madeleine Albright
17	Germany	4 May 2022	Berlin	Official visit
18	United States	6–23 May 2022	Washington, D.C., San Francisco, Des Moines	Official visit
19	United States	25–26 July 2022	Washington, D.C.	Working visit
20	Japan	26–28 September 2022	Tokyo	State Funeral of Shinzo Abe
21	Germany	3 November 2022	Berlin	Berlin Process
22	France	10 November 2022	Paris	Paris Peace Forum
23	Estonia	18 November 2022	Tallinn	Official visit
24	Czech Republic	15 December 2022	Prague	Working visit
25	Austria	12 January 2023	Vienna	Official visit
26	Turkey	3 February 2023	Istanbul	Working visit
27	Germany	18–19 February 2023	Munich	Munich Security Conference
28	European Union	27 February 2023	Brussels	Belgrade–Pristina negotiations
29	France	15 March 2023	Strasbourg	Working visit
30	North Macedonia	18 March 2023	Ohrid	Belgrade–Pristina negotiations
31	South Korea	4–5 May 2023	Seoul	Working visit
32	Slovakia	31 May 2023	Bratislava	Globsec Forum
33	Vatican City	22 June 2023	Vatican City	Official visit
34	United Kingdom	26–27 June 2023	London	Official visit
35	Greece	21–22 August 2023	Athens	Working visit
36	Slovenia	27–28 August 2023	Bled	Bled Strategic Forum
37	Switzerland	22 September 2023	Bern	Official visit
38	United Kingdom	9 October 2023	Liverpool	Working visit
39	Albania	16 October 2023	Tirana	Berlin Process
40	France	9 November 2023	Paris	Paris Peace Forum
41	Austria	12 November 2023	Vienna	Vienna Economic Forum
42	Belgium	14 December 2023	Brussels	Working visit
43	Switzerland	16–19 January 2024	Davos	World Economic Forum
44	North Macedonia	21–22 January 2024	Skopje	Western Balkan Summit
45	United States	8 February 2024	New York City	UNSC Meeting
46	Germany	16 February 2024	Munich	Munich Security Conference
47	United Kingdom; Northern Ireland	23–29 February 2024	London, Belfast	Working visit
48	Ireland	29 February – 1 March 2024	Dublin	Official visit
49	Italy	2 March 2024	Rome	Working visit
50	Bulgaria	22–23 April 2024	Sofia	Official visit
51	Montenegro	15–16 May 2024	Kotor	EU–Western Balkan Summit
52	United Kingdom	23 May 2024	London	Working visit
53	Turkey	31 May – 3 June 2024	Istanbul	Official visit
54	Germany	19 June 2024	Hamburg	UEFA Euro 2024
55	Turkey	4 July 2024	İzmir	Working visit
56	France	25–26 July 2024	Paris	2024 Summer Olympics opening ceremony
57	United States	19–22 August 2024	Chicago	2024 Democratic National Convention
58	European Union	19 September 2024	Brussels	Berlin Process Summit
59	United States	20–26 September 2024	New York City	Working visit
60	Poland	1–2 October 2024	Warsaw	Warsaw Security Forum
61	Germany	14 October 2024	Berlin	Berlin Process
62	Switzerland	1–2 November 2024	Bern	Working visit
63	European Union	3 December 2024	Brussels	Working visit
64	Bosnia and Herzegovina	5 December 2024	Sarajevo	Working visit
65	Croatia	13 December 2024	Zagreb	Official visit
66	Switzerland	20–24 January 2025	Davos	World Economic Forum
67	Vatican City	26 April 2025	Vatican City	Death and funeral of Pope Francis
68	United Kingdom	22 October	London	Berlin Process summit.
69	France	29–30 October	Paris	Paris Peace Forum.
70	Germany	14 February 2026	Munich	62nd Munich Security Conference
71	France	27 March 2026	Paris	Official visit
72	Armenia	3–4 May 2026	Yerevan	8th European Political Community Summit
73	Ireland	9 November 2026	Dublin	9th European Political Community Summit

== Multilateral meetings ==
Albin Kurti participated in the following summits during his premiership:

Group	Year				
Group	2021	2022	2023	2024	2025
Berlin Process	5 July, (videoconference) (Germany) Berlin	3 November, (Germany) Berlin	16 October, (Albania) Tirana	14 October, (Germany) Berlin	22 October, (United Kingdom) London

== See also ==
- Politics of Kosovo
- Foreign relations of Kosovo
- International recognition of Kosovo
