= List of international prime ministerial trips made by Nikolai Denkov =

This is a list of international prime ministerial trips made by Nikolai Denkov, who served as the Prime Minister of Bulgaria from 6 June 2023 to 9 April 2024.

== Summary ==
Denkov has visited 11 countries during his tenure as prime minister. The number of visits per country where Denkov has traveled are:

- One visit to Israel, Romania, Spain, Switzerland, Ukraine
- Two visits to Denmark, France, Germany, Greece and Lithuania
- Five visits to Belgium

== 2023 ==
Country	Location(s)	Dates	Details
Belgium	Brussels	28–30 June	Met with President of the European Commission Ursula von der Leyen prior to a bilateral meeting in the Berllaymont, the EU Commission headquarter. Ahead his first visit, he declares that the radical pro-Russian party Vazrazhdane is a neo-fascist organisation because of the aggressive behaviour of its leader and supporters. Met with NATO Secretary General Jens Stoltenberg in NATO Headquarters and attended the European Council summit.
Lithuania	Vilnius	11–12 July	Denkov travelled to Vilnius to attend the 33rd NATO summit.
Romania	Bucharest	14 July	Met with Prime Minister Marcel Ciolacu to discuss Schengen zone and regional security.
Belgium	Brussels	17–18 July	Attended the 3rd EU–CELAC summit.
Greece	Athens	21 August	Attended Ukraine-South East Europe summit.
Germany	Berlin	4 October	Met with Chancellor Olaf Scholz. They discussed topics related to Schengen, the Western Balkans, the war in Ukraine and the upcoming highest-level talks in the Spanish city of Granada
Spain	Granada	5–6 October	Denkov attended the 3rd European Political Community Summit.
Albania	Tirana	16 October	Attended Western Balkans Summit.
Belgium	Brussels	26–27 October	Denkov attended European Council meeting.
Israel	Jerusalem	6 November	Met with Prime Minister Benjamin Netanyahu to express Bulgaria's strong support for Israel following the Hamas attacks. The discussions focused on the security situation, the need for the release of hostages, and Israel's right to defend itself, as well as humanitarian concerns related to the conflict. He also held talks with President Isaac Herzog and emphasized Bulgaria's readiness to provide humanitarian assistance, including medical support, while both sides discussed the broader regional situation and international response.
Denmark	Copenhagen	14 November	Denkov travelled to Copenhagen to meet with prime ministers Mette Frederiksen (Denmark), Petteri Orpo (Finland), Leo Varadkar (Ireland), Ulf Kristersson (Sweden) and Evika Siliņa (Latvia).
Belgium	Brussels	13–15 December	Attended EU-Western Balkans summit followed by the European Council.

== 2024 ==
Country	Location(s)	Dates	Details
Greece	Athens	4 January	First official visit in the new year. Meeting with Prime Minister Kyriakos Mitsotakis to discuss transport and energy connectivity.
France	Paris	5 January	Denkov attended the commemoration ceremony of Jacques Delors.
Switzerland	Davos	16–19 January	Participation in the World Economic Forum (WEF). Discussion of innovation and Bulgaria's accession to the eurozone.
Denmark	Copenhagen	29 January	Met with Prime Minister Mette Frederiksen. They discussed Denmark's experience in the operation of wind power plants to generate electricity as a good supplement to photovoltaic power plants.
Germany	Munich	16–18 February	Attended the 60th Munich Security Conference
France	Paris	21 February	Denkov met with President Emmanuel Macron in Paris to discuss Bulgaria's reform progress and its foreign policy priorities, including accession to the Schengen Area, the eurozone, and the OECD. The talks also emphasized European support for Bulgaria's reforms and closer cooperation within European Union.
Ukraine	Kyiv	26 February	Met with President Volodymyr Zelenskyy to discuss regional logistics and infrastructure development, including efforts to expand trade routes and restore navigation in the Black Sea and Danube regions. The talks also covered defense cooperation, including prospects for joint production, as well as energy cooperation and support for Ukraine amid Russian aggression. They further discussed sanctions against Russia, accountability for war crimes, and Ukraine's European and Euro-Atlantic integration, as well as cooperation on the implementation of Ukraine's Peace Formula and broader international coordination.
Belgium	Brussels	21–22 March	Denkov attended the formal meeting of the European Council and Nuclear Energy summits.
Lithuania	Vilnius	2 April	He travelled to Vilnius to attend a working dinner on the invitation of Lithuanian president Gitanas Nausėda and President of the European Council Charles Michel. The dinner focused on European future issues such as European Union Aid to Ukraine, potential enlargement of the European Union, competitiveness and migration and asylum policy.

== Multilateral meetings ==
Nikolai Denkov participated in the following summits during his premiership:

Group	Year	
Group	2023	2024
NATO	11–12 July, (Lithuania) Vilnius	
EPC	5 October, (Spain) Granada	
EU–CELAC	17–18 July, (Belgium) Brussels	None
