= List of international prime ministerial trips made by Hristijan Mickoski =

This is a list of international prime ministerial trips made by Hristijan Mickoski, the current prime minister of North Macedonia since 23 June 2024.

== Trips ==
=== Summary ===
Mickoski has visited 7 countries during his tenure as prime minister. The number of visits per country where Mickoski has traveled are:

- One visit to Albania, Belgium, and Hungary
- Two visits to Croatia, Germany, the United Kingdom and the United States

== 2024 ==
Country	Location(s)	Dates	Details
United States	Washington D.C.	9–11 July	Mickoski attended the 2024 NATO summit
United Kingdom	Woodstock	18 July	Mickoski attended the 4th European Political Community Summit.
Croatia	Zagreb	29 August	Mickoski is paying Thursday his first official visit to Croatia at the invitation of his Croatian counterpart, Andrej Plenkovic
Belgium	Brussels	20 September	Met with the head of the European Council, Charles Michel, and attended a work lunch with the European Commission president, Ursula von der Leyen. He declared that his country will no longer accept any ultimatums on its EU path.
Croatia	Dubrovnik	9 October	Addressed the third Ukraine-South East Europe summit.
Germany	Berlin	14 October	Attended Western Balkans Summit.
Hungary	Budapest	7 November	Mickoski attended the 5th European Political Community Summit.

== 2025 ==
Country	Location(s)	Dates	Details
Germany	Munich	14–16 February	Attended 61st Munich Security Conference.
Albania	Tirana	16 May	Mickoski attended the 6th European Political Community Summit.
United Kingdom	London	22 October	Attended Western Balkans Summit.

== 2026 ==
Country	Location(s)	Dates	Details
United States	New York City	25 September	Mickoski attended the General debate of the eighty-first session of the United Nations General Assembly.

== Multilateral meetings ==
Hristijan Mickoski participated in the following summits during his premiership:

Group	Year	
Group	2024	2025
NATO	9–11 July, (United States) Washington, D.C.	24–25 June^{[a]}, (Netherlands) The Hague
EPC	18 July, (United Kingdom) Woodstock	16 May, (Albania) Tirana
EPC	7 November, (Hungary) Budapest	2 October^{[a]}, (Denmark) Copenhagen
Berlin Process	14 October, (Germany) Berlin	22 October, (United Kingdom) London
██ = Did not attend / participate.^aPresident Gordana Siljanovska-Davkova attended in the Prime Minister's place. ██ = Future event.
