= CCHR =

CCHR may refer to:

- Calendar of the Charter Rolls (CChR), book series translating and summarising these medieval documents
- Cambodian Center for Human Rights, a non-governmental organization based in Phnom Penh, Cambodia
- Citizens Commission on Human Rights, an anti-psychiatry organization affiliated with Scientology
- Civic Committee for Human Rights, a nongovernmental nonprofit organization in Croatia

== See also ==
- Carl Christensen (botanist) (1872–1942) (standard author abbreviation C.Chr.), Danish systematic botanist
- National Center for Civil and Human Rights (NCCHR), a proposed archives, museum, and cultural and research center in Atlanta, Georgia, United States
