= Youth Initiative for Human Rights =

Network of non-governmental organizations

- Official logo
- Abbreviation: YIHR
- Formation: 2003
- Type: Non-Profit
- Legal status: NGO
- Headquarters: Regional (Zagreb, Beograd, Sarajevo, Podgorica, Priština)
- Region served: Serbia Bosnia; Croatia; Montenegro Kosovo
- Official language: Serbo-Croatian, Albanian, English
- Staff: 30
- Website: yihr.org

The Youth Initiative for Human Rights (Serbo-Croatian: Inicijativa mladih za ljudska prava; Albanian: Nisma e të Rinjve për të Drejtat e Njeriut) or YIHR is a network of autonomous non-governmental organizations active in Serbia, Kosovo, Croatia, Montenegro and Bosnia and Herzegovina. It is focused on building connections and establishing cooperation between young people from different ethnic groups in the Balkans.

== History ==
YIHR supported the work of the International Criminal Tribunal for the former Yugoslavia (ICTY) through information dissemination and education and monitoring of human rights. It also organizes visits to the International Commission on Missing Persons.

In 2008 Croatian branch of the organization was established which led to transformation of national offices/programs into autonomous organizations that established a regional YIHR Regional Network in 2010.

On 25 September 2013 the European Court of Human Rights delivered the judgment in the case of Youth Initiative for Human Rights v. Serbia, stating that there has been a violation of Article 10 of the European Convention on Human Rights and that Serbia must ensure, within three months from the date on which the judgment with the information requested. The Kosovo and Serbia branches work together on campaigns against the glorification of war criminals, which occurs in both countries.

Regional network won several awards, including being the corecipient of the Vaclav Havel Human Rights Prize in 2019.

== Regional network of organizations ==
=== YIHR – Serbia ===
The Youth Initiative for Human Rights in Serbia (YIHR SR) was founded in 2003 in Belgrade. The executive director is Sofija Todorović.

=== YIHR – Kosovo ===
The Youth Initiative for Human Rights in Kosovo (YIHR KS) was founded in 2004 in Priština. As of 2017 the executive director is Marigona Shabiu.

=== YIHR – Bosnia and Herzegovina ===
The Youth Initiative for Human Rights in Bosnia and Herzegovina (YIHR BiH) was established in 2007 in Sarajevo. Executive director is Irena Hasić.

=== YIHR – Croatia ===
The Youth Initiative for Human Rights in Croatia (YIHR HR) was registered in 2008 from previous YIHR Zagreb office. Executive director is Morana Starčević.

=== YIHR – Montenegro ===
The Youth Initiative for Human Rights in Montenegro (YIHR HR) was founded in 2008. Executive director is Edina Hasanaga Čobaj.

== See also ==
- Humanitarian Law Center
- UDIK
- Civic Committee for Human Rights
- Sarajevo Open Centre
