= 2017 Western Balkans Summit, Trieste =

Annual summit

Western Balkans Summit "Trieste Balkans 2017"
- Participating non-EU states Participating EU states Rest of the EU
- Host country: Italy
- Dates: 12 July 2017
- Cities: (Italy) Trieste
- Participants: European Union; Albania; Austria; Bosnia and Herzegovina; Croatia; Germany; Italy; Kosovo; France; (North Macedonia) Republic of Macedonia; Montenegro; Serbia; Slovenia
- Chair: Paolo Gentiloni
- Follows: 2016 Western Balkans Summit, Paris
- Precedes: 2018 Western Balkans Summit, London

Key points

The 2017 Western Balkans Summit in Trieste, Italy was the fourth annual summit within the Berlin Process initiative for European integration of Western Balkans states. Previous summits took place in Berlin in 2014, Vienna in 2015 and in Paris in 2016. Heads of government, foreign ministers and the ministers of economy of Albania, Bosnia and Herzegovina, Kosovo, Republic of Macedonia, Montenegro, Serbia, as well as EU member states from the region Croatia, Slovenia and EU member states Austria, France, Germany, Italy as well as representatives of the European Union and the International Financial Institutions attended. Participants once again committed the Western Balkan's eventual path into the EU and agreed the next Berlin Process Summit would take place in London.

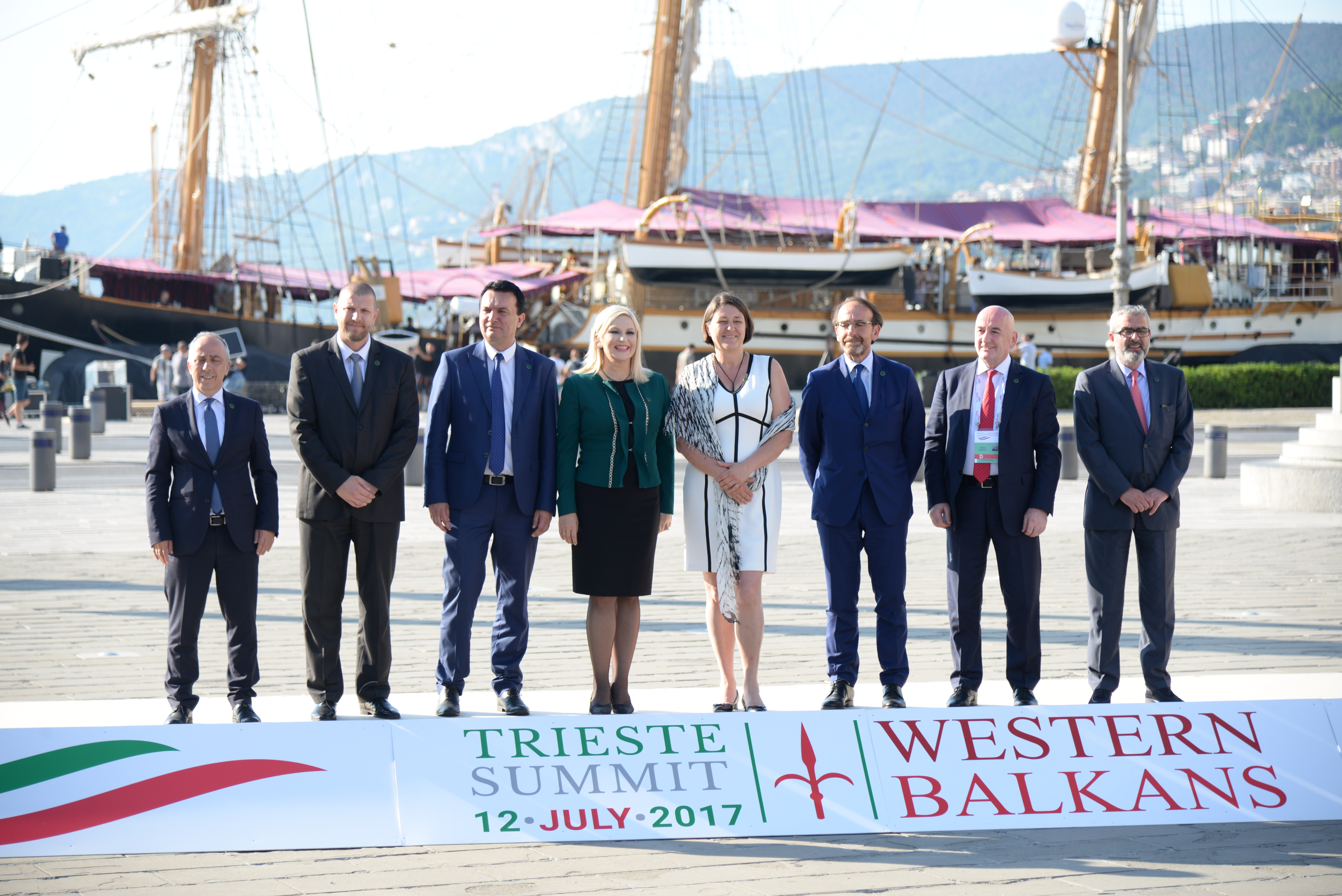
Photo family with Commissioner Violeta Bulc.

== Agenda ==
Issues discussed during the summit included laying the foundations for a common Balkan market, increasing regional cooperation, improving and expanding infrastructure and energy services, curbing migration, and fighting corruption, terrorism, and radicalism. Plans drawn up during the summit included a Connectivity Agenda, a regional economic integration plan, private sector development, and expanding people-to-people contacts. Investments totaling greater than 500 million euros from the European Investment Bank and the European Bank for Reconstruction and Development were agreed upon by the participants. The talks of Germany and the EU funding infrastructure and rebuilding less-developed areas in the region has been compared to The Marshall Plan, being dubbed The Balkan Marshall Plan.

=== Connectivity ===
Infrastructure is slated to be harmonized and built with EU regulations within the region, alongside repairs and updates to existing infrastructure.

=== Regional Economic Integration ===
The foundations for a common Balkan market were agreed upon. The summit leaders decided to focus on mostly investing in start-ups and scale-ups. The region also started on the path to integration within the pan-European digital market. To help facilitate this process, the Chamber Investment Forum of the Western Balkans was created. Johannes Hahn stated the economic integration and lowering of tariffs could produce up to 80,000 jobs.

=== People-to-People Contacts ===
Balkan and EU leaders agreed to extend the Erasmus Exchange Programme to the Balkans as well as organising an EU-Western Balkans Youth Forum.

== See also ==
- Berlin Process
- Southeast Europe
- Stabilisation and Association Process
- Central European Free Trade Agreement
- Stability Pact for South Eastern Europe
- Southeast Europe Transport Community
