= 2019 Western Balkans Summit, Poznań =

Western Balkans Summit "Poznań 2019"
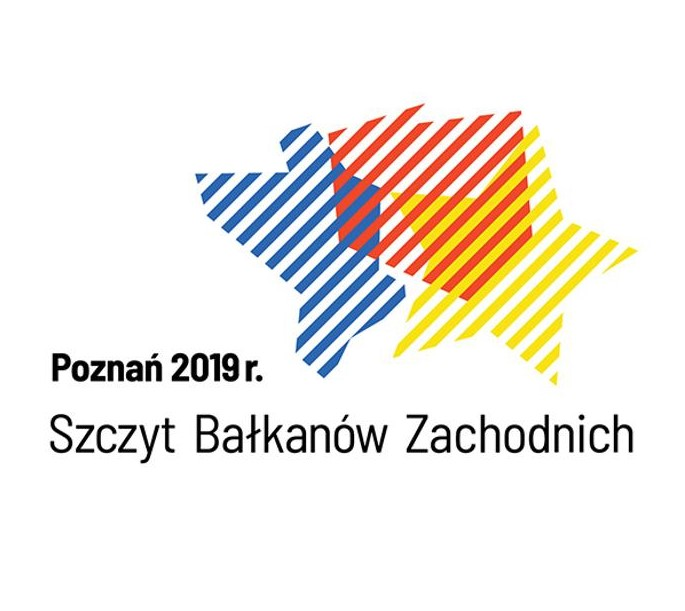
- Host country: Poland
- Dates: 4–5 July
- Cities: (Poland) Poznań
- Participants: European Union; Albania; Austria; Bosnia and Herzegovina; Croatia; Germany; Greece; Italy; Kosovo; France; North Macedonia; Montenegro; Serbia; Slovenia
- Chair: Mateusz Morawiecki
- Follows: 2018 Western Balkans Summit, London
- Precedes: 2020 Western Balkans Summit, Skopje & Sofia

Key points

The 2019 Western Balkans Summit in Poznań, Poland, was the sixth annual summit within the Berlin Process initiative for European integration of Western Balkans states. Heads of government, foreign ministers, and the ministers of economy from Albania, Bosnia and Herzegovina, Kosovo, North Macedonia, Montenegro, and Serbia attended, as well as two existing EU member states from the region - Croatia and Slovenia. In addition, other EU member states including Austria, France, Germany, and Italy, as well as representatives of the European Union and the International Financial Institutions, attended to the summit.

The summit took place on 4 and 5 July 2019.

== Agenda ==
The agenda there will be economy, connectivity, civil society with a focus on youth and culture, and security.

On the first day are planned the meetings of ministers the economy, the interior, and foreign affairs of the Berlin Process countries whereas on the second of the presidents and prime ministers. The meetings will be accompanied by the EU-Western Balkans Business Forum and the Civil Society Forum.

== See also ==
- Berlin Process
- Southeast Europe
- Stabilisation and Association Process
- Central European Free Trade Agreement
- Stability Pact for South Eastern Europe
