= Igman Initiative =

The Igman Initiative (Serbo-Croatian: Igmanska inicijativa) is an umbrella association whose goal is to foster economic and political cooperation as well as to encourage normalization of inter-state relations among the countries of the Dayton Quadrangles: Croatia, Bosnia and Herzegovina, Serbia and Montenegro.

== History ==
The initiative was named after Mt. Igman in remembrance of the intellectual activists, who traveled from all over former Yugoslavia via the Igman Mountain Road to Sarajevo in April 1995 in solidarity with the besieged population. In November 2000 a conference Prospects of Relations between Bosnia-Herzegovina, the Republic of Croatia and the FRY” was convened in Zagreb. The conference gathered more than a hundred NGOs from the nations ratifying the Dayton Agreement. The participating organizations agreed to formally join their efforts to stimulate the normalization of relations among the three countries. In 2001 in Novi Sad the second session of the conference was held where the Initiative was formally established and a Council was appointed.

The Igman Initiative was founded by the Center for Regionalism (Novi Sad, Serbia), the Forum of the Democratic Alternative BiH (Sarajevo, BiH) and the Civic Committee for Human Rights (Zagreb, Croatia). Freedom House provides nearly all of the funding for the Igman Initiative projects.

== Organization ==
The Igman Initiative is now governed by four co-Presidents from Croatia, BiH, Serbia and Montenegro and its Council is currently composed of twenty members, five per country. It comprises more than 140 non-governmental organizations from Serbia, Montenegro, BiH, and Croatia.
