= Pyramid of Tirana =

Building in Tirana, Albania

- Official logo
- Interactive map of the Pyramid of Tirana area
- Alternative names: Pjeter Arbnori International Center of Culture; Enver Hoxha Museum

General information
- Architectural style: Late Socialism
- Location: Bulevardi Deshmoret e Kombit 5, 1010, Tirana, Albania
- Coordinates: 41°19′23″N 19°49′17″E
- Construction started: 1986
- Opened: 14 October 1988
- Renovated: May 2023

Design and construction
- Architects: Pirro Vaso, Klement Kolaneci, Pranvera Hoxha and Vladimir Bregu

Website
- piramida.edu.al

The Pyramid of Tirana (Albanian: Piramida e Tiranës) is a structure and former museum located in Tirana, the capital of Albania. It opened as a museum in 1988 and became a conference center in 1991 following the collapse of Communism. During the 1999 Kosovo War, the building was used as a NATO base.

In 2018, a new project was unveiled by the Albanian-American Development Foundation (AADF) that would turn the pyramid into a youth IT centre for Creative Technologies with a focus on computer programming, robotics, and start ups under the name of TUMO Center Tirana. The renovated structure, transformed by MVRDV, was opened to the public in 2023.

== History ==
=== Background ===
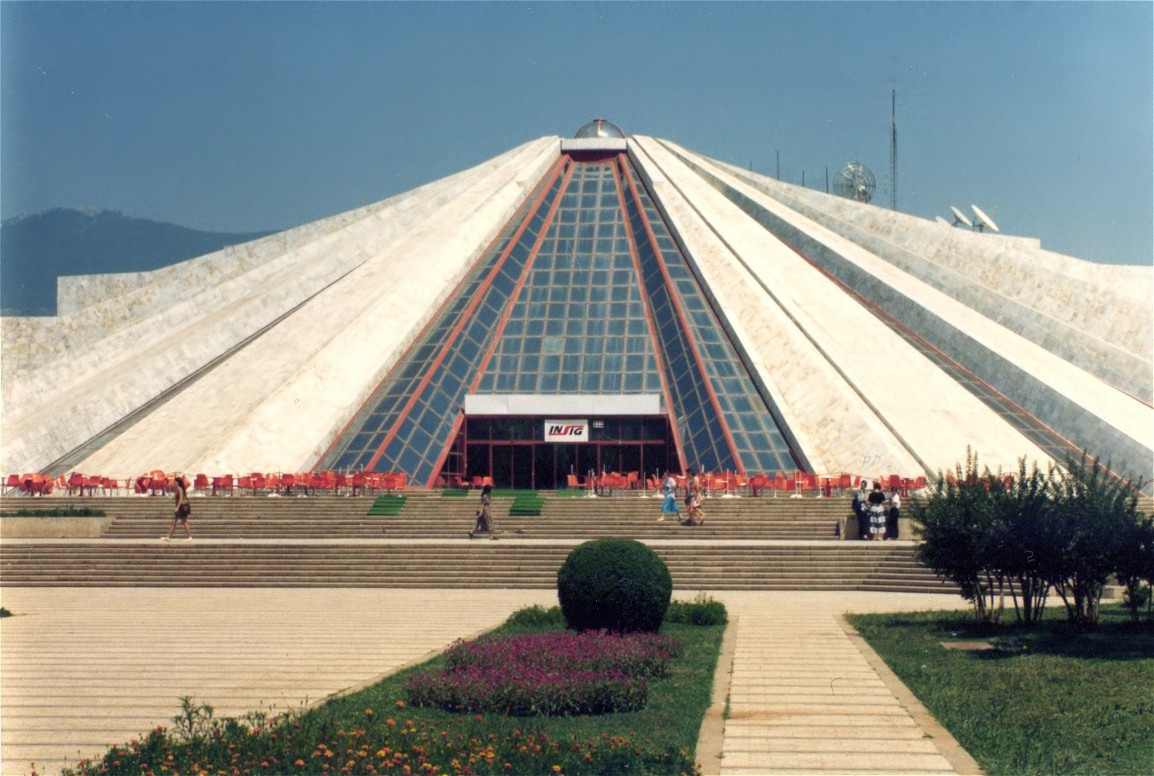
The Pyramid in 1996

On 14 October 1988, the structure opened as the Enver Hoxha Museum, originally serving as a museum about the legacy of Enver Hoxha, the long-time leader of Communist Albania, who had died three years earlier. The structure was co-designed by Hoxha's daughter Pranvera Hoxha, an architect, and her husband Klement Kolaneci, along with Pirro Vaso and Vladimir Bregu.

When built, the Pyramid was said to be the most expensive individual structure ever constructed in Albania.

The Pyramid has sometimes been sardonically called the "Enver Hoxha Mausoleum", although this was never intended to be named like this or even used as official appellation.

=== Post-Communism ===
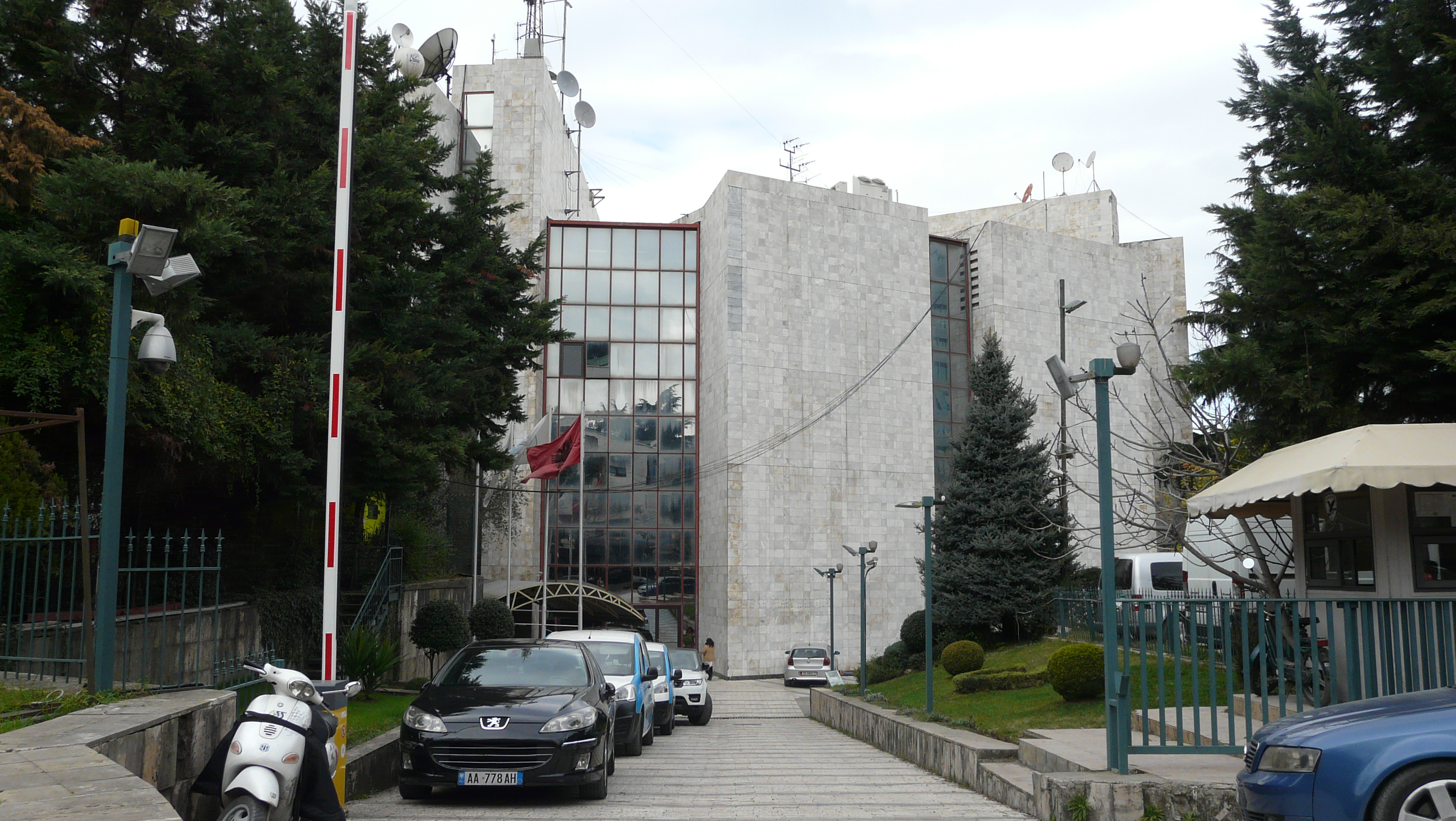
Top Media former studios at the Pyramid

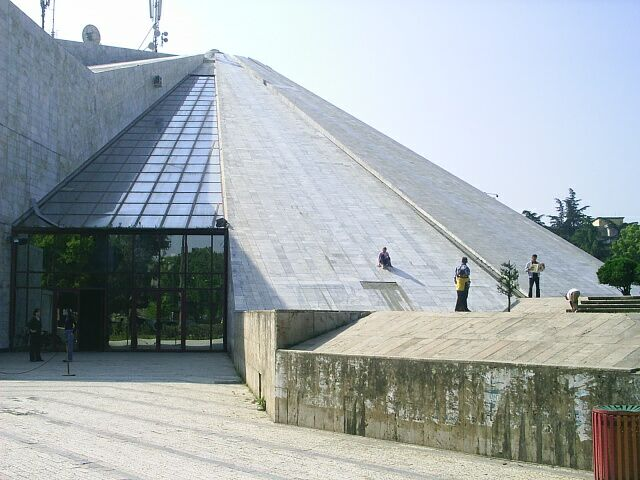
Children sliding down the pyramid, 2012

After 1991, following the collapse of Communism, the Pyramid ceased its function as a museum and for several years was repurposed as a conference center and exhibition venue, as well as being rebranded with its current name. During the 1999 Kosovo War, the former museum was used as a base by NATO and humanitarian organizations.

Since 2001, part of the Pyramid has been used as broadcasting center by Albanian media outlets Top Channel and Top Albania Radio, while the rest of the structure and the paved surrounding area (currently being used as a parking lot and bus station for minivans to Elbasan) have experienced dilapidation and vandalism.

Part of Armando Lulaj's film It Wears as It Grows (2011) was shot inside the Pyramid. In 2019, the Pyramid was also used as a filming location for part of a remake of the 1995 cult horror film Castle Freak.

=== Possible demolition ===
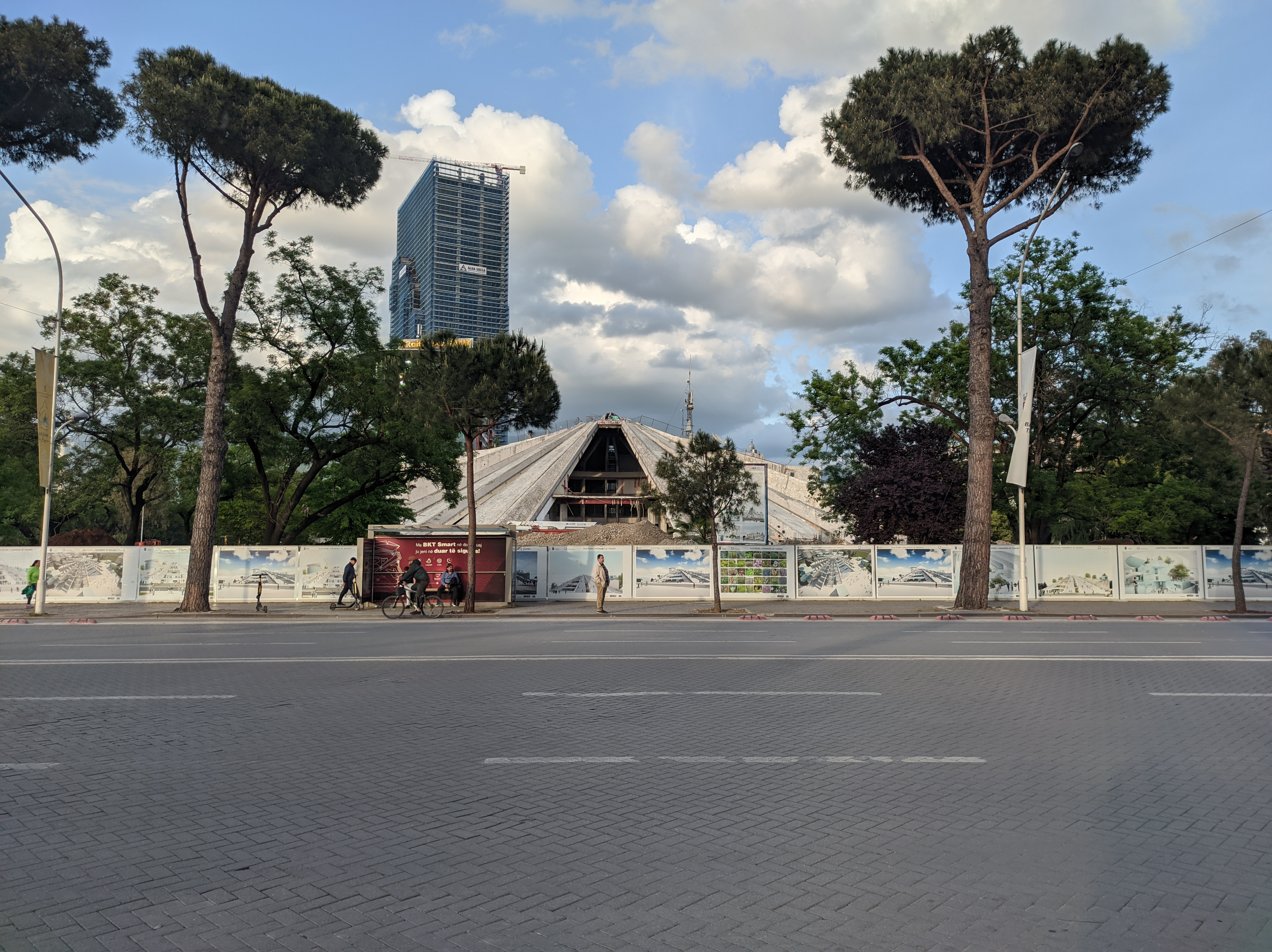
Construction works, 2021

Numerous proposals to demolish the Pyramid and to redevelop the land of the 17,000-square-metre (1.7 ha) complex for alternative uses have been made, with the most prominent proposal being the potential construction of a new Albanian parliament building on the site.

A previous proposal for the site to become a new opera theater was approved but cancelled shortly after construction work began. The exterior marble tiles covering the structure were removed to a depot outside of Tirana. The proposed demolition of the Pyramid itself became a point of controversy among some leading foreign architects, who have both supported and opposed it. Historian Ardian Klosi initiated a petition against the demolition of the structure, gathering around 6000 signatures. A study published in 2015 but undertaken in 2013 suggests that the majority of citizens of Tirana were against the demolition.

It was announced in 2017 that the Pyramid would not be demolished, but refurbished.

=== Renovation ===
In 2018, a redevelopment project was announced to transform the Pyramid of Tirana into a youth-oriented information technology centre known as TUMO Tirana, focusing on computer programming, robotics, and start-ups. The project proposed the addition of staircases along the sloping exterior of the Pyramid, as well as new glass-covered areas to increase natural light within the structure.

Construction work on the renovation began in February 2021. The renovation works continued until October 2023, when the Pyramid of Tirana reopened to the public. Access to the stepped façade had already been open to the public since May. The official inauguration of the renovated Pyramid took place on 16 October 2023, coinciding with the Western Balkans Summit held in Tirana.

The project converted the former communist-era monument into a contemporary cultural and educational hub, while preserving its original concrete structure and introducing terraced steps, skylights, and colourful new architectural elements. The renovated building now accommodates spaces dedicated to technology, art, and education, with a primary focus on young people.

Pictures of the renovated Pyramid of Tirana
The Pyramid of Tirana after renovation in 2023.

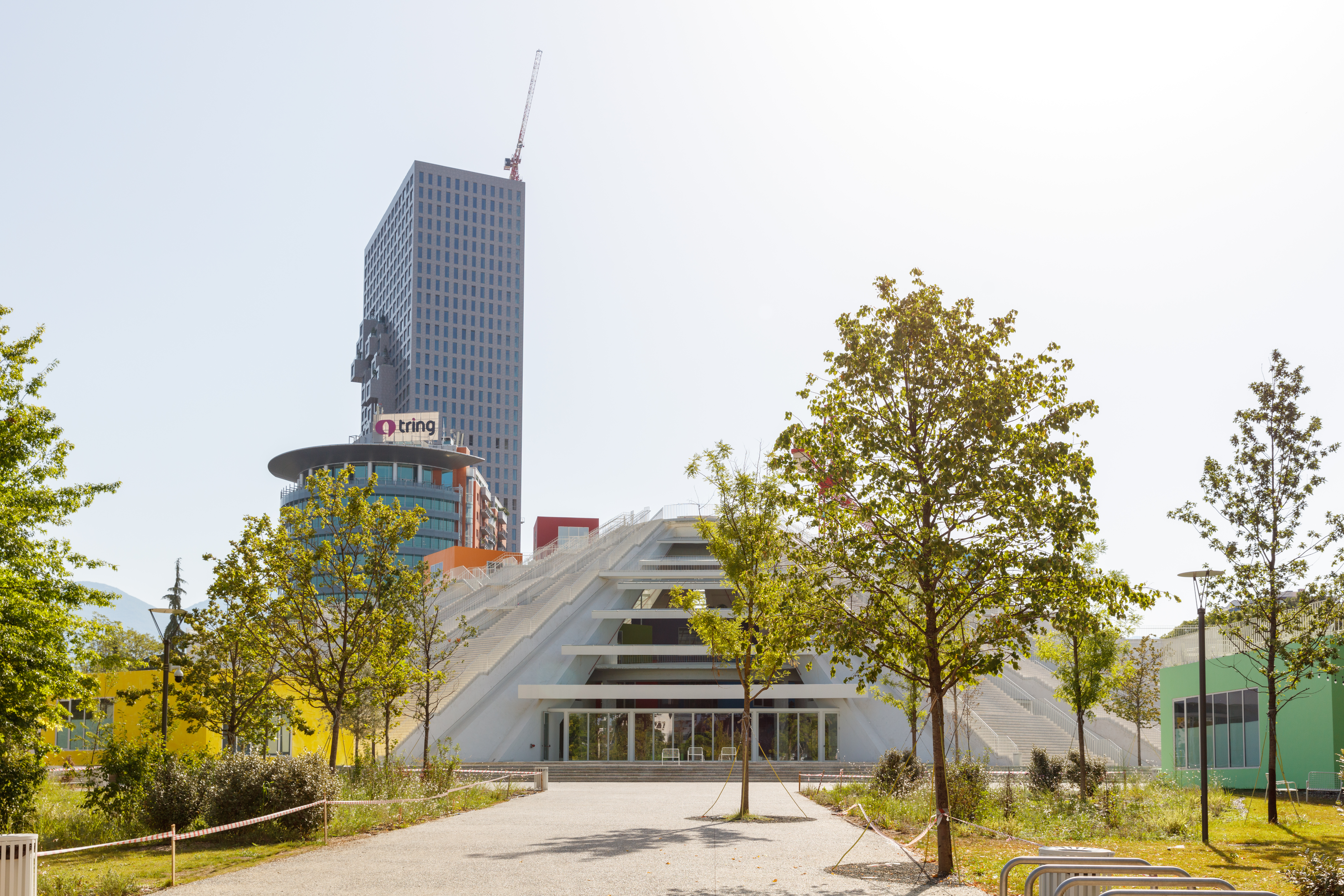
A different picture, also in 2023.

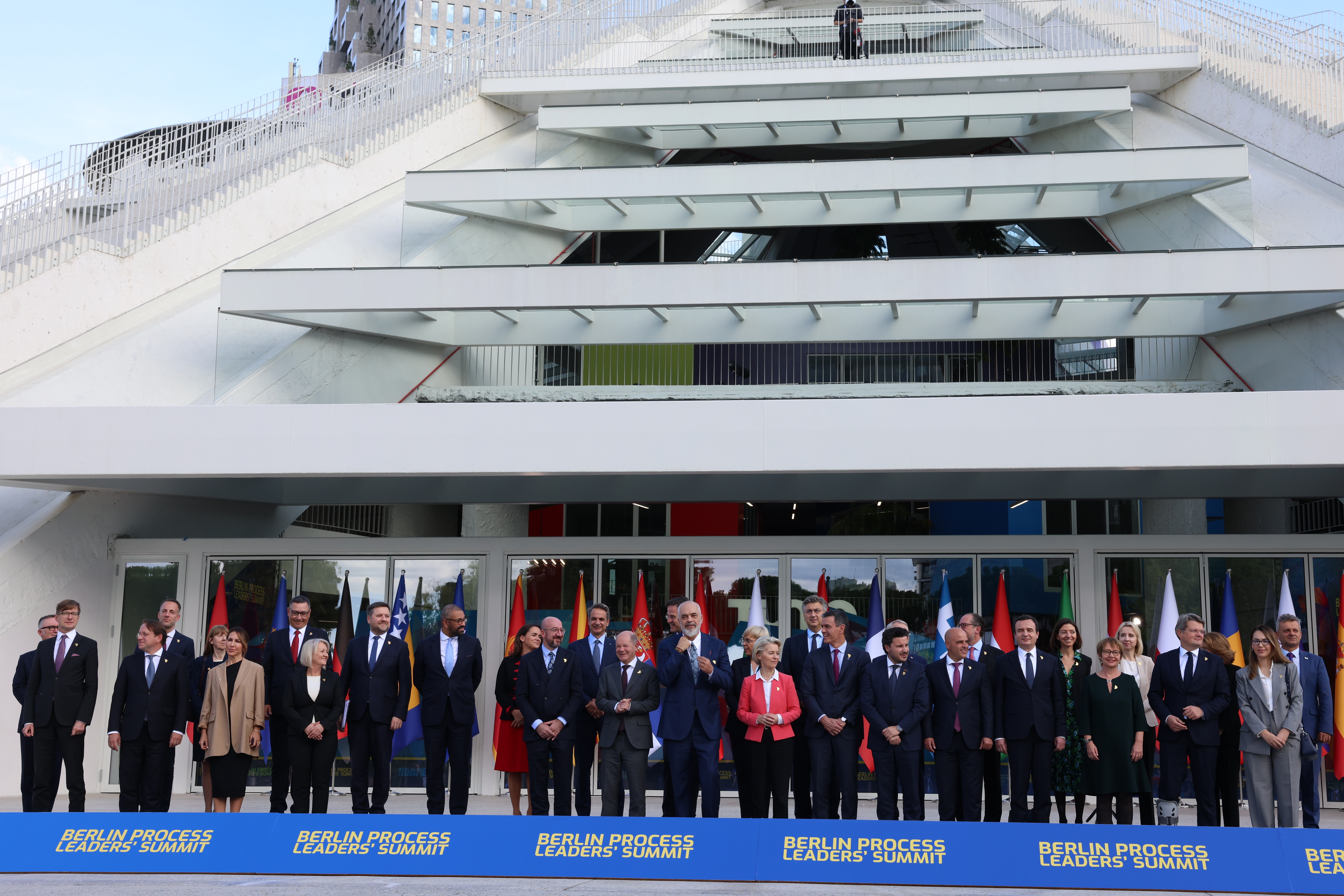
Photo of European leaders in front of the Pyramid Western Balkans Summit.

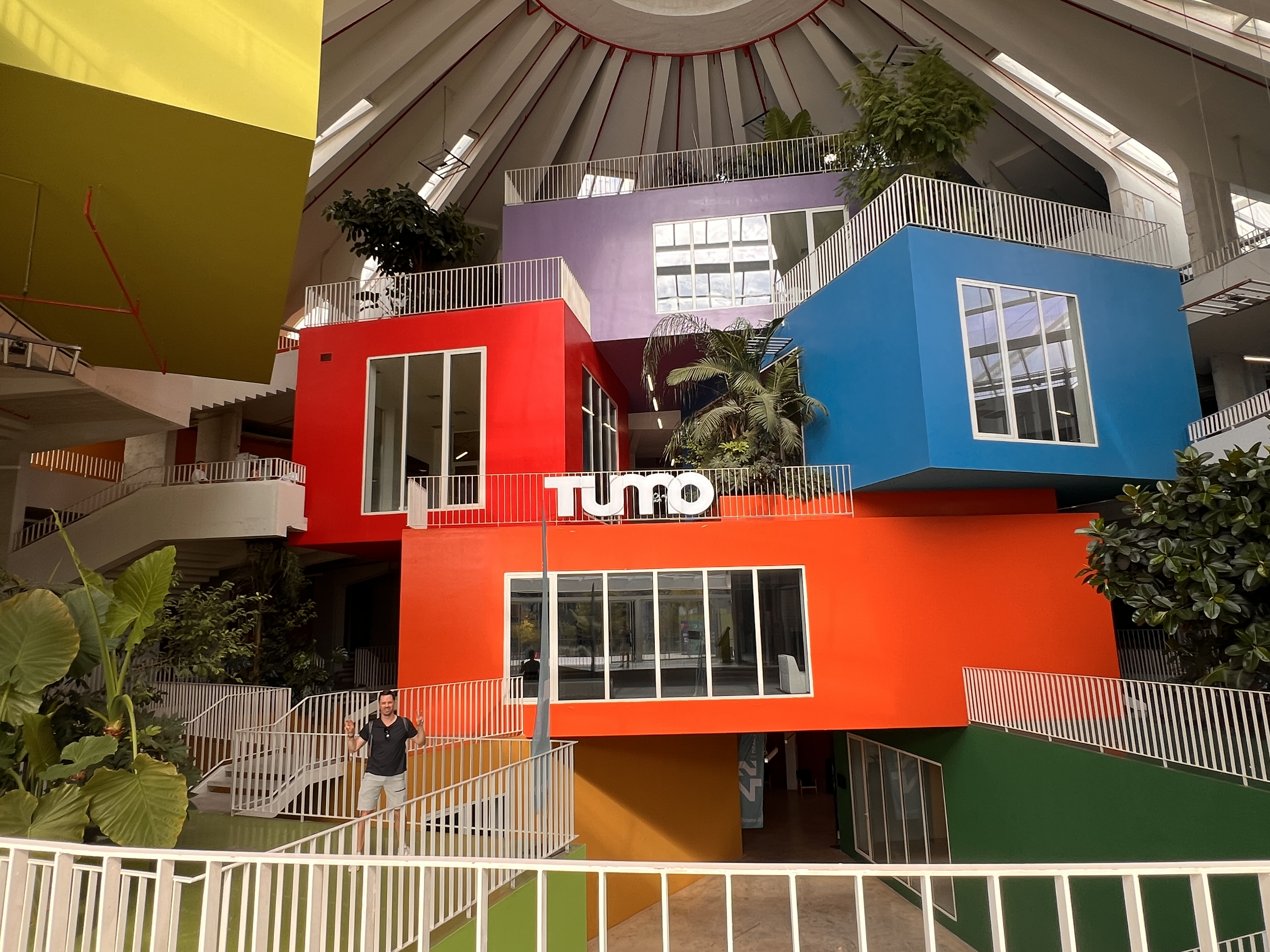
The interior of the Pyramid in 2025.

== See also ==
- Enver Hoxha
- The Pyramid (Kadare novel)
- Tumo Center for Creative Technologies

== Bibliography ==
- Roberto Ragione, Dalla dittatura alla didattica, in «Industria Italiana del Cemento» (n. 863, 2025), Pubblicemento, Roma 2025, pp. 94-97. ISSN 0019-7637
