= 2016 Western Balkans Summit, Paris =

Western Balkans Summit Sommet "Paris Balkans 2016"
- Host country: France
- Dates: 4 July 2016
- Cities: (France) Paris
- Venues: Élysée Palace
- Participants: European Union; Albania; Austria; Bosnia and Herzegovina; Croatia; Germany; Italy; Kosovo; France; (North Macedonia) Republic of Macedonia; Montenegro; Serbia; Slovenia
- Chair: François Hollande
- Follows: 2015 Western Balkans Summit, Vienna
- Precedes: 2017 Western Balkans Summit, Trieste
- Website: Western Balkans Summit

Key points

Participating non-EU states Participating EU states EU states not participating

2016 Western Balkans Summit in Paris, France was third annual summit within the Berlin Process initiative for European integration of Western Balkans states. Previous summits took place in Berlin in 2014 and in Vienna in 2015. Heads of government, foreign ministers and the ministers of economy of Albania, Bosnia and Herzegovina, Kosovo, Republic of Macedonia, Montenegro, Serbia, as well as EU member states from the region Croatia, Slovenia and EU member states Austria, France, Germany, Italy as well as representatives of the European Union and the International Financial Institutions took part in Paris summit. Summit took place on 4 July 2016. Participants welcomed the intention of Italy to host the next summit in 2017.

Summit took place in the context of the outcome of the United Kingdom European Union membership referendum. Western Balkans participants reaffirmed their commitment to European integrations process. European perspective of the region was recognized to all countries during the summits in Zagreb and Thessaloniki in 2000 and 2003 and "repeatedly and unequivocally reiterated since then" as stated in Final Declaration after the summit. Participants reaffirmed the importance of regional cooperation and their commitment to abstain from misusing bilateral issues in the EU accession process. At the day of summit Regional Youth Cooperation Office was established based on experience of the Franco-German Youth Office. All parties welcomed the progress with projects that were launched in August 2015 and agreed upon a list of 3 new railway projects, which will receive EU co-financing of little less than 100 million euros in addition to financing from the International Financial Institutions and the national budgets of the Western Balkan states. The parties welcomed the launch of an energy efficiency initiative supported by EU through funding of 50 million euros. Participants agreed on a road-map for the setting up of a regional market for electricity in the Western Balkans and European Commission intent to support initiative through the Energy Community secretariat. Regional market integration, especially through CEFTA was reaffirmed. Improving the perspective of younger generations' through Erasmus+ and investments in education were discussed.

== See also ==
- Berlin Process
- Southeast Europe
- Stabilisation and Association Process
- Central European Free Trade Agreement
- Stability Pact for South Eastern Europe
