= Croatia Forum =

Annual international conference

The Croatia Forum, previously known as Croatia Summit, is an annual international conference held in Dubrovnik, Croatia since 2006 which focuses on Southeastern Europe.

== Croatia Summit 2006: Future of Southeast Europe ==
=== Hosts ===
- Croatian Prime Minister Ivo Sanader
- Croatian President Stjepan Mesić
- Croatian Parliament Speaker Vladimir Šeks

=== Delegates ===
- Albanian Prime Minister Sali Berisha
- Montenegrin Prime Minister Milo Đukanović
- Romanian Prime Minister Călin Popescu-Tăriceanu
- Bosnian and Herzegovinian Prime Minister Adnan Terzić
- Georgian President Mikheil Saakashvili

== Croatia Summit 2007: Europe's New South ==
=== Delegates ===
- Zbigniew Brzezinski
- Noël Kinsella - Speaker of the Canadian Senate
- Mikheil Saakashvili - Georgian President
- Giorgi Ugulava - Mayor of Tbilisi
- Aigars Kalvītis - Latvian Prime Minister
- Nikola Gruevski - Macedonian Prime Minister
- Vasile Tarlev - Moldovan Prime Minister
- Roman Giertych - Polish Deputy Prime Minister
- Călin Popescu-Tăriceanu - Romanian Prime Minister
- Vuk Jeremić - Serbian Foreign Affairs Minister
- Robert Fico - Slovak Prime Minister
- Karl Erjavec - Slovenian Minister of Defence
- Carl Bildt - Swedish Foreign Affairs Minister
- Agim Çeku - Kosovar Prime Minister
- Jaap de Hoop Scheffer - NATO Secretary General

== Croatia Summit 2008: Security, Development, Prosperity ==
=== Delegates ===
- Mikheil Saakashvili - Georgian President
- Ferenc Gyurcsány - Hungarian Prime Minister
- Sali Berisha - Albanian Prime Minister
- Hashim Thaqi - Kosovan Prime Minister
- Robert Fico - Slovak Prime Minister
- Milo Đukanović - Montenegrin Prime Minister
- Dan Fried - United States Assistant State Secretary

== Croatia Summit 2009: Europe's Strategic Imperative - Energy, Investment and Development ==
=== Delegates ===
- Nikola Špirić - Bosnia and Herzegovina Prime Minister
- Milo Đukanović - Montenegrin Prime Minister
- Hashim Thaçi - Kosovo Prime Minister
- Miroslav Lajčák - Slovak Minister of Foreign Affairs
- Antonio Milošoski - Macedonian Minister of Foreign Affairs

== Croatia Summit 2010 – South East Europe Facing Global Challenges ==
=== Hosts ===
- Croatian Prime Minister Jadranka Kosor
- Croatian President Ivo Josipović
- Croatian Parliament Speaker Luka Bebić

=== Delegates ===
- Silvio Berlusconi - Italian Prime Minister
- François Fillon - French Prime Minister
- Donald Tusk - Polish Prime Minister
- Boyko Borisov - Bulgarian Prime Minister
- Borut Pahor - Slovenian Prime Minister
- Milo Đukanović - Montenegrin Prime Minister
- Hashim Thaçi - Kosovo Prime Minister
- Štefan Füle - European Commissioner
- Michael Spindelegger - Austrian Minister of Foreign Affairs
- Miroslav Lajčák - Slovak Minister of Foreign Affairs
- Antonio Milošoski - Macedonian Minister of Foreign Affairs
