= Albania–France relations =

- Albania: France

Diplomatic mission
- Embassy of Albania Paris: Embassy of France; Tirana

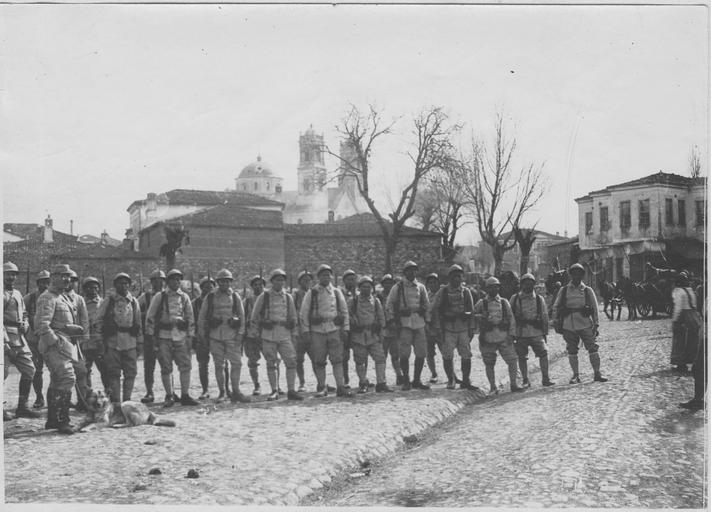
French troops in Korçë during the Occupation in World War I.

Albania and France are members of the North Atlantic Treaty Organization (NATO) and the Organization for Security and Co-operation in Europe (OSCE). Albania is an EU candidate and France is an EU member.

Bilateral cooperation focuses on cultural exchange and promoting the French language, strengthening the rule of law, and supporting Albania’s European integration. France has invested over €300 million in Albania in the period 2023-2025 through the French Development Agency.

== History ==
During the Middle Ages, the Anjous, a French noble family took control of Albania between 1272-1382.

During the Balkan Wars (1912-1913), Albanians declared the independence of Albania from the Ottoman Empire. France along with Russia opposed Albanian aims due to their support for Serbia, and both backed their Balkan allies' proposals for less territory and coast for the new borders of the Albanian state.

During World War I, France would occupy Southeastern Albania and created the Autonomous Province of Korçë, a French protectorate founded in 1916. The French would occupy this region until 1920 when they withdrew forces from the area.

Upon the end of World War II, France remained the only Western country where Albania had diplomatic and economic relations with, owing to Communist dictator Enver Hoxha’s French education. France was Communist Albania’s only nominal Western trading partner throughout the Cold War.

As a European Union (EU) founder and member, France was one of the only countries that did not support Albania in its euro-integration path, until March 30, 2020.

== Economic relations ==
In 2024, trade between Albania and France reached €38.9 million, with France exporting €22.8 million and importing €16.1 million, maintaining a positive trade balance of €6.69 million. French exports to Albania grew by 14.2% year-on-year, led by publications, food industry products, and chemicals, while imports from Albania include mainly clothing, leather goods, and textiles.

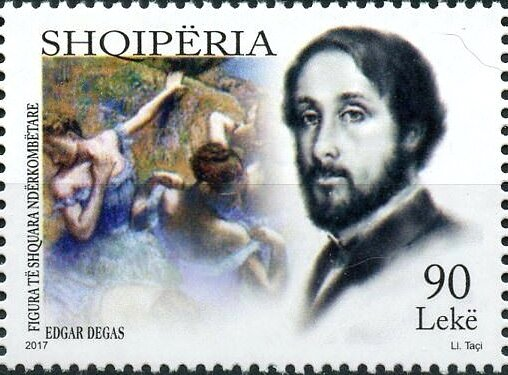
Albanian postal stamp commemorating Edgar Degas.

== Cultural relations ==
French cooperation in Albania is led by the French embassy’s Cooperation and Cultural Action Service (SCAC), supported by archaeological missions and a network of Alliance Française offices. Albania is a regional hub for Francophonie, with French as the second most-taught foreign language and strong educational partnerships, including bilingual high school programs.

== High Level Visits ==
In late 2024, French President Emmanuel Macron paid his second visit to Albania in less than two years, staying beyond the European Political Community Summit for a bilateral meeting with Prime Minister Edi Rama. The visit underscored deepening Franco-Albanian ties, producing new agreements on tourism, energy, and defense, including radar systems for Albania, and reaffirming France’s strong support for Albania’s EU accession.

During his 2025 visit to Albania, President Emmanuel Macron praised Albania’s leadership in the Western Balkans since 2019, highlighting its exemplary progress and commitment to European integration. He reaffirmed France’s strong trust and confidence in Albania’s path toward EU membership, calling it a journey that is steadily becoming a reality.

== Resident diplomatic missions ==
- Albania has an embassy in Paris.
- France has an embassy in Tirana.
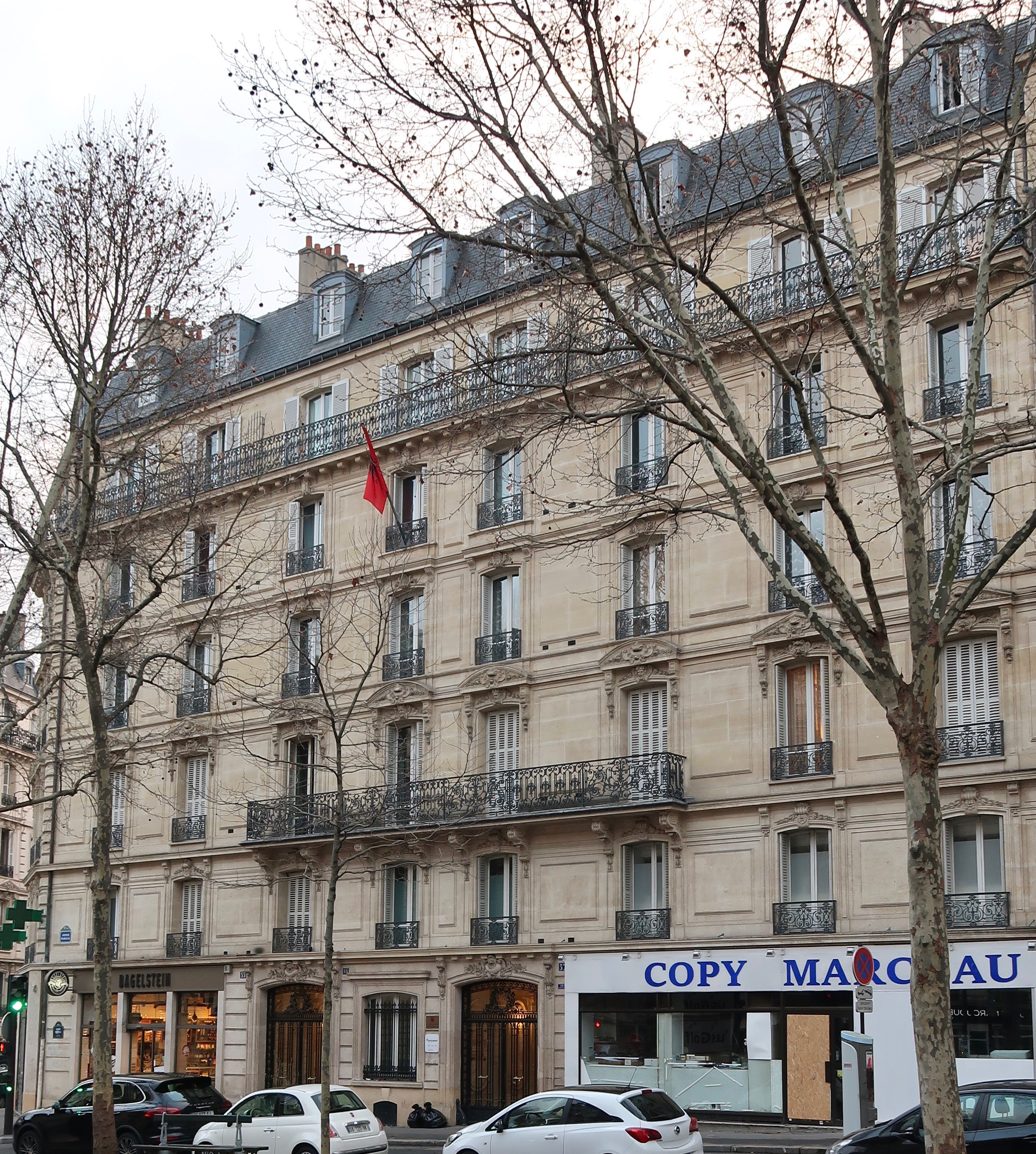
Embassy of Albania in Paris

== See also ==
- Foreign relations of Albania
- Foreign relations of France
- Accession of Albania to the EU
- NATO-EU relations
- French in Albania
- Albanians in France
