= 2014 Conference of Western Balkan States, Berlin =

Conference of Western Balkan States Change Through Meetings
- Host country: Germany
- Dates: 28 August 2014
- Cities: (Germany) Berlin
- Participants: European Union; Albania; Austria; Bosnia and Herzegovina; Croatia; Germany; Kosovo; (North Macedonia) Republic of Macedonia; Montenegro; Serbia; Slovenia
- Chair: Angela Merkel (German chancellor)
- Follows: first conference
- Precedes: 2015 Western Balkans Summit, Vienna

Key points
- Future enlargement of the European Union

Conference of Western Balkan States was a 28 August 2014 conference of heads of states and governments of Western Balkans region initiated by German chancellor Angela Merkel. An idea for organization of conference came in light of the celebration of the 100th anniversary of the beginning of World War I. It is the first conference in this framework and organizers expressed their desire to continue it in future with Vienna and Paris mentioned as a potential next hosts after Berlin (so called Berlin Process). Günther Oettinger confirmed at conference that event will be organised annually with Vienna as a host city in 2015 and Paris in 2016.

The German chancellor announced intention to organize a conference on 7 June 2014. Invitation for participation was sent to all the countries of South Eastern Europe including Croatia and Slovenia that were already members of the European Union at the time of conference.

The main intention was to show commitment for process of Future enlargement of the European Union, little progress of Bosnia and Herzegovina and Macedonia in that process and relations of Serbia with Russia in the light of International sanctions during the 2014 pro-Russian unrest in Ukraine.

During the Foreign Ministers’ segment, Albanian Foreign Minister Bushati underlined the importance of making this initiative periodical, as well as finding the right instruments to enable, in future years, the drafting and implementation of concrete joint projects in the region. In this regard Albanian delegation presented a document under the title "Albanian Working Paper for the Western Balkans Conference in Berlin", which is based in the vision of "a region in peace and well prepared to join the European Union, by guarantying a dignified living for all its citizens."

At conference was announced future visit of Albanian Prime Minister Edi Rama to Serbia. It will be the first meeting of this type between two countries after 1947 meeting of Enver Hoxha with President of Yugoslavia Josip Broz Tito. However, an incident during a football match in Belgrade has cast doubt on this visit. Edi Rama eventually visited Serbia on 10 November 2014 to meet his Serbian counterpart but tempers flared when Rama said that Kosovo's independence was "undeniable" and "must be respected" and Serbian Prime Minister Aleksandar Vučić accused him of a "provocation".

Franz Lothar Altmann, expert on the Balkans, stated in his pre-conference interview for Radio Free Europe/Radio Liberty that conference proves increasing importance of Balkan region, especially with respect to the Russo-Ukrainian War.

== Regional activities before conference ==
Prime ministers of Serbia Aleksandar Vučić and Deputy Chair of the Bosnia-Herzegovina Council of Ministers of Bosnia Zlatko Lagumdžija met in Belgrade on 20 August to agree on joint projects that two countries will present in Berlin. Serbian delegation also announced its intention seek support for infrastructure project of modernization of the Belgrade–Bar railway.

On 25 August 2014 Prime ministers of Croatia, Montenegro, Bosnia and Herzegovina, and Albania meet prior to conference in Croatian town of Cavtat. Prime ministers exchange views on infrastructure projects and other topics of common interest which may be discussed at conference.

Croatia announced its intention to seek support for construction of section of Adriatic–Ionian motorway along the coast conditional on it receiving EU funds for the Pelješac Bridge.

On 2014 Croatia Summit Aleksei Meshkov, Russian Deputy Foreign Minister, said that European Union should not push the Western Balkan States to select EU or Russia.

== Participants of conference ==
Participating non-EU states Participating EU states EU states not participating

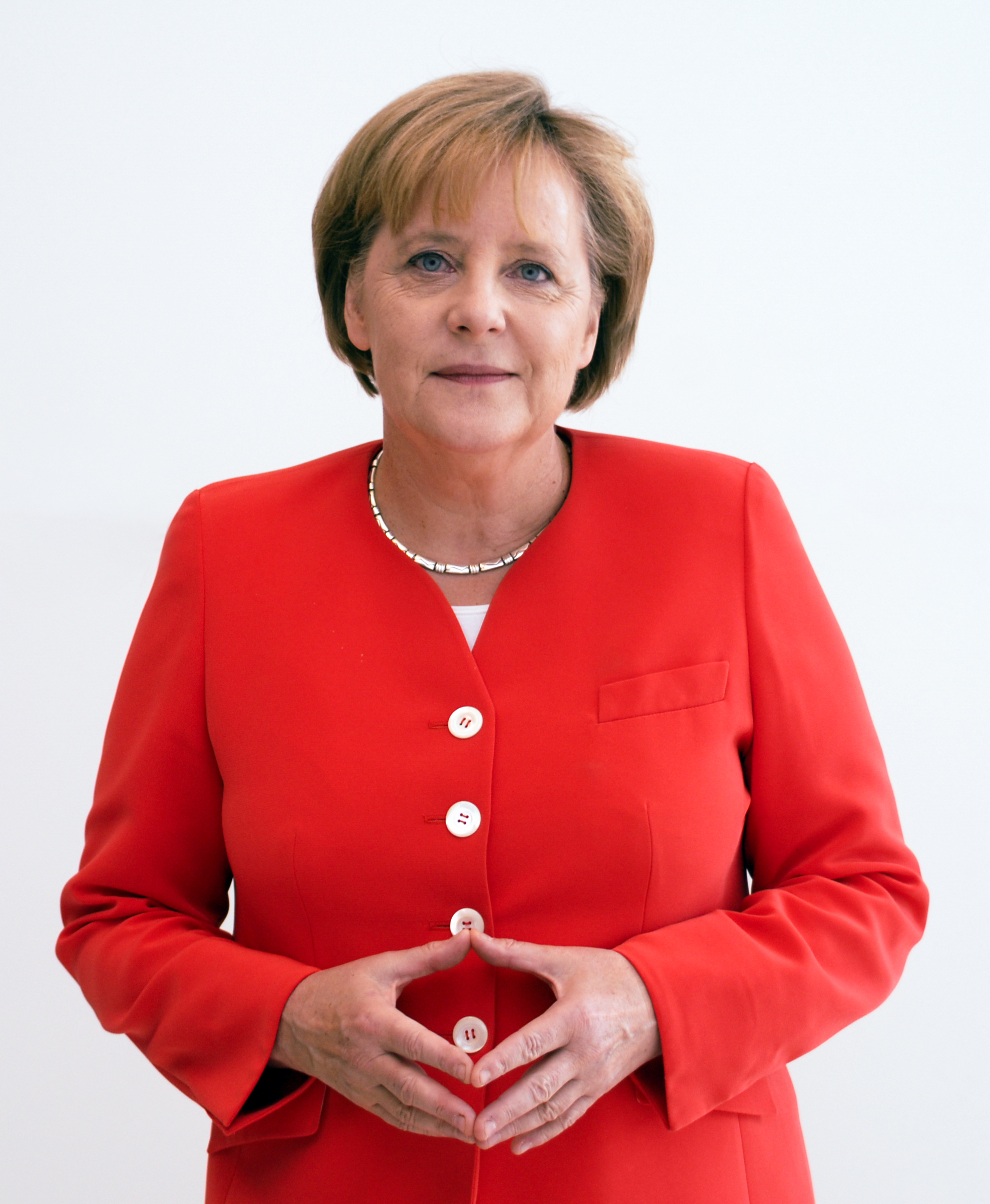
Angela Merkel initiated conference

- (European Union) José Manuel Barroso, president of the European Commission
- (European Union) Štefan Füle, European Commissioner for Enlargement and European Neighbourhood Policy
- (European Union) Günther Oettinger, European Commission Vice President
- (Germany) Angela Merkel
- Sigmar Gabriel, Minister for Economic Affairs and Energy and Vice Chancellor of Germany
- Frank-Walter Steinmeier, Minister for Foreign Affairs of Germany
- Werner Faymann, Chancellor of Austria
- (Austria) Reinhold Mitterlehner, Austrian federal minister of economy
- Sebastian Kurz, Minister for Foreign Affairs of Austria
- Aleksandar Vučić, Prime Minister of Serbia
- Ivica Dačić, Minister of Foreign Affairs of Serbia
- Zoran Milanović, Prime Minister of Croatia
- Vesna Pusić, Minister of Foreign and European Affairs of Croatia
- Ivan Vrdoljak, Minister of Economy of Croatia
- Alenka Bratušek, Prime Minister of Slovenia
- Karl Erjavec, Minister of Foreign Affairs of Slovenia
- Metod Dragonja, Minister of Economic Development and Technology of Slovenia
- Milo Đukanović, Prime Minister of Montenegro
- (Montenegro) Igor Lukšić, Minister of Foreign Affairs
- Vladimir Kavarić, Minister of Economy of Montenegro
- Vjekoslav Bevanda, Chairman of the Council of Ministers of Bosnia and Herzegovina
- Zlatko Lagumdžija, Deputy Chairman of the Council of Ministers of Bosnia and Herzegovina
- (Bosnia and Herzegovina) Boris Tučić, Minister of Foreign trade and economic relations
- Edi Rama, Prime Minister of Albania
- Ditmir Bushati, Minister of Foreign Affairs of Albania
- (North Macedonia) Nikola Gruevski, Prime Minister of Macedonia
- (North Macedonia) Vladimir Peševski, Deputy Prime Minister
- (North Macedonia) Bekim Neziri
- Hashim Thaçi, Prime Minister of Republic of Kosovo
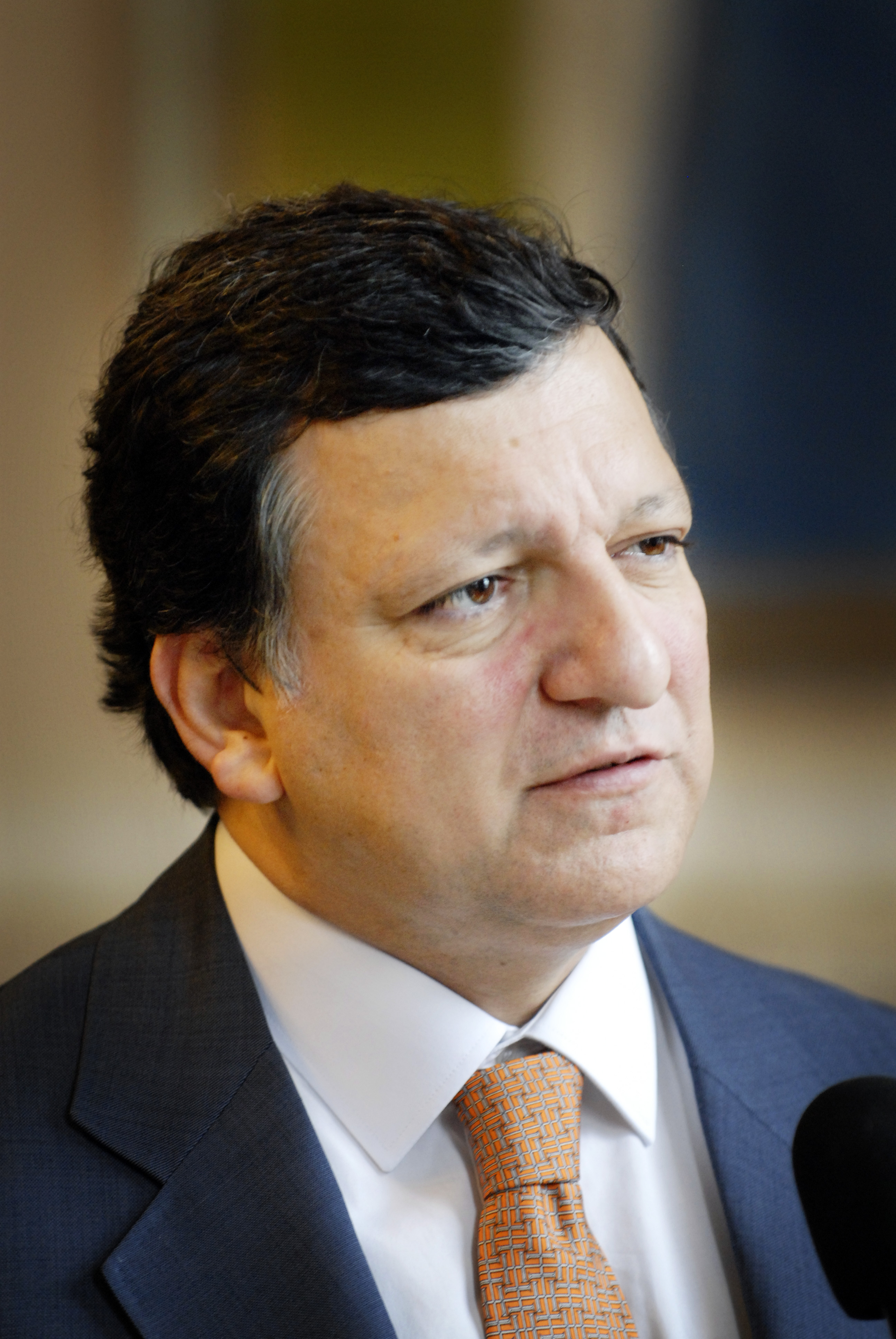
José Manuel Barroso

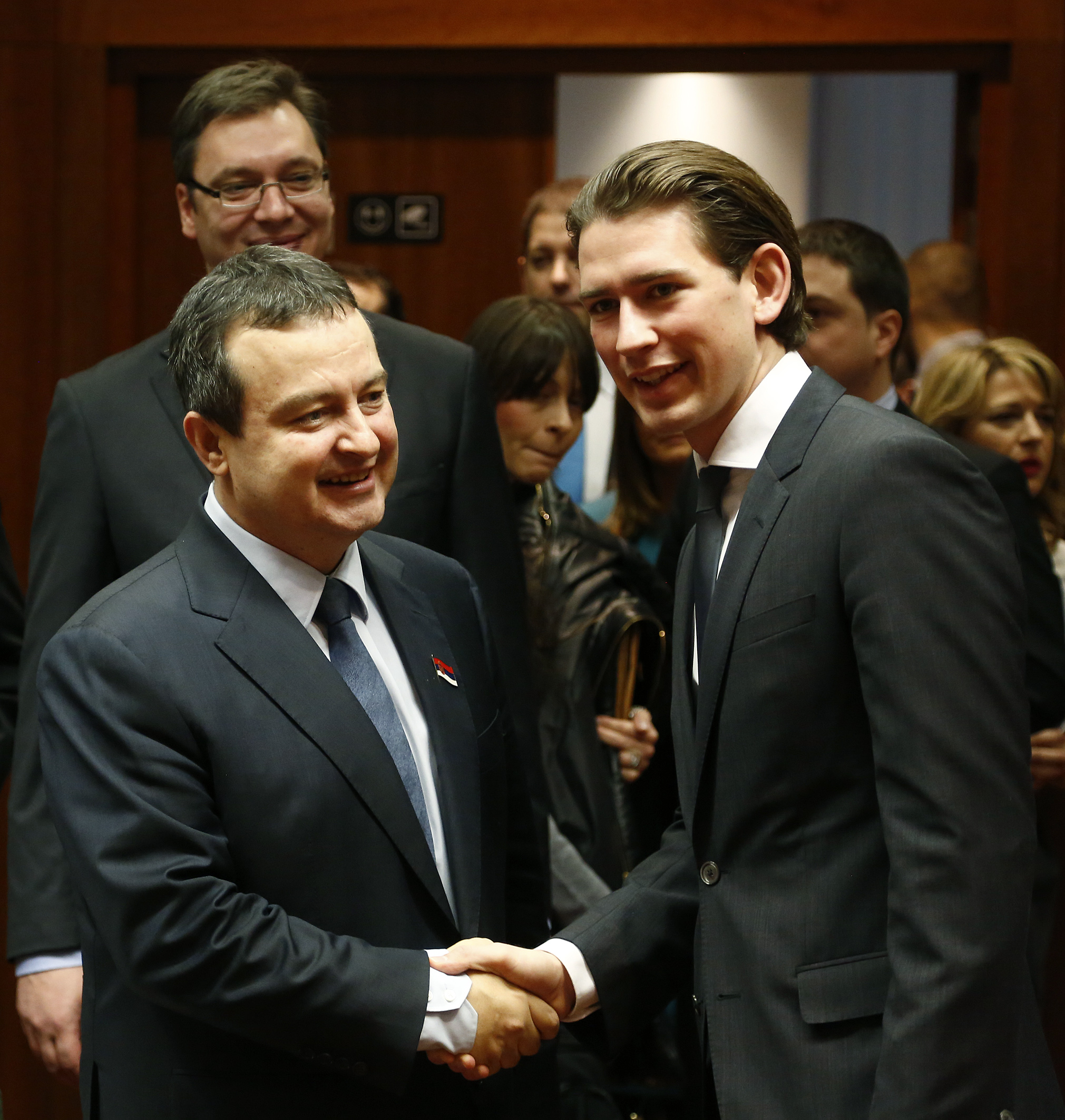
Ivica Dačić
and
Sebastian Kurz

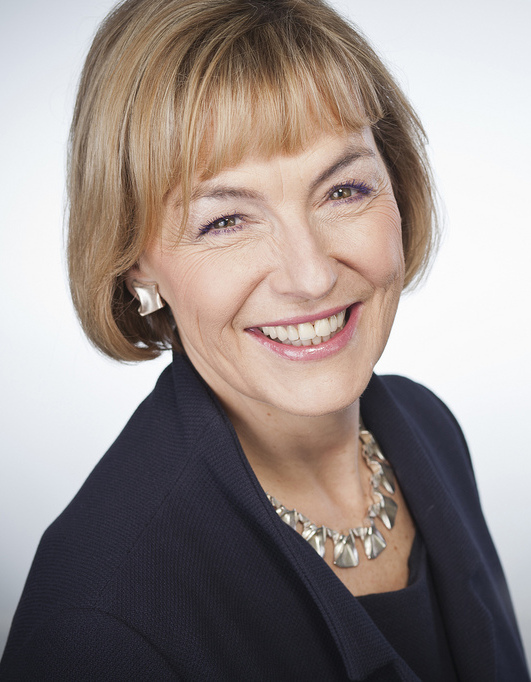
Vesna Pusić

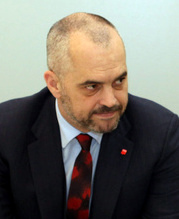
Edi Rama

== See also ==
- Berlin Process
- Southeast Europe
- Treaty of Berlin (1878)
- Croatia Summit
- Igman Initiative
- Stabilisation and Association Process
- Central European Free Trade Agreement
- Stability Pact for South Eastern Europe
- South-East European Cooperation Process
- Regional Cooperation Council
- Southeast European Cooperative Initiative
- Russia in the European energy sector
