= 2015 Western Balkans Summit, Vienna =

Western Balkans Summit Westbalkan-Konferenz
- Host country: Austria
- Dates: 27 August 2015
- Cities: (Austria) Vienna
- Venues: Hofburg Palace
- Participants: European Union; Albania; Austria; Bosnia and Herzegovina; Croatia; Germany; Italy; Kosovo; France; (North Macedonia) Republic of Macedonia; Montenegro; Serbia; Slovenia
- Chair: Sebastian Kurz (Federal Ministry for Europe, Integration and Foreign Affairs)
- Follows: 2014 Conference of Western Balkan States, Berlin
- Precedes: 2016 Western Balkans Summit, Paris
- Website: Western Balkans Summit

Key points
- Future enlargement of the European Union Extension of transport infrastructure in the region

Participating non-EU states Participating EU states EU states not participating

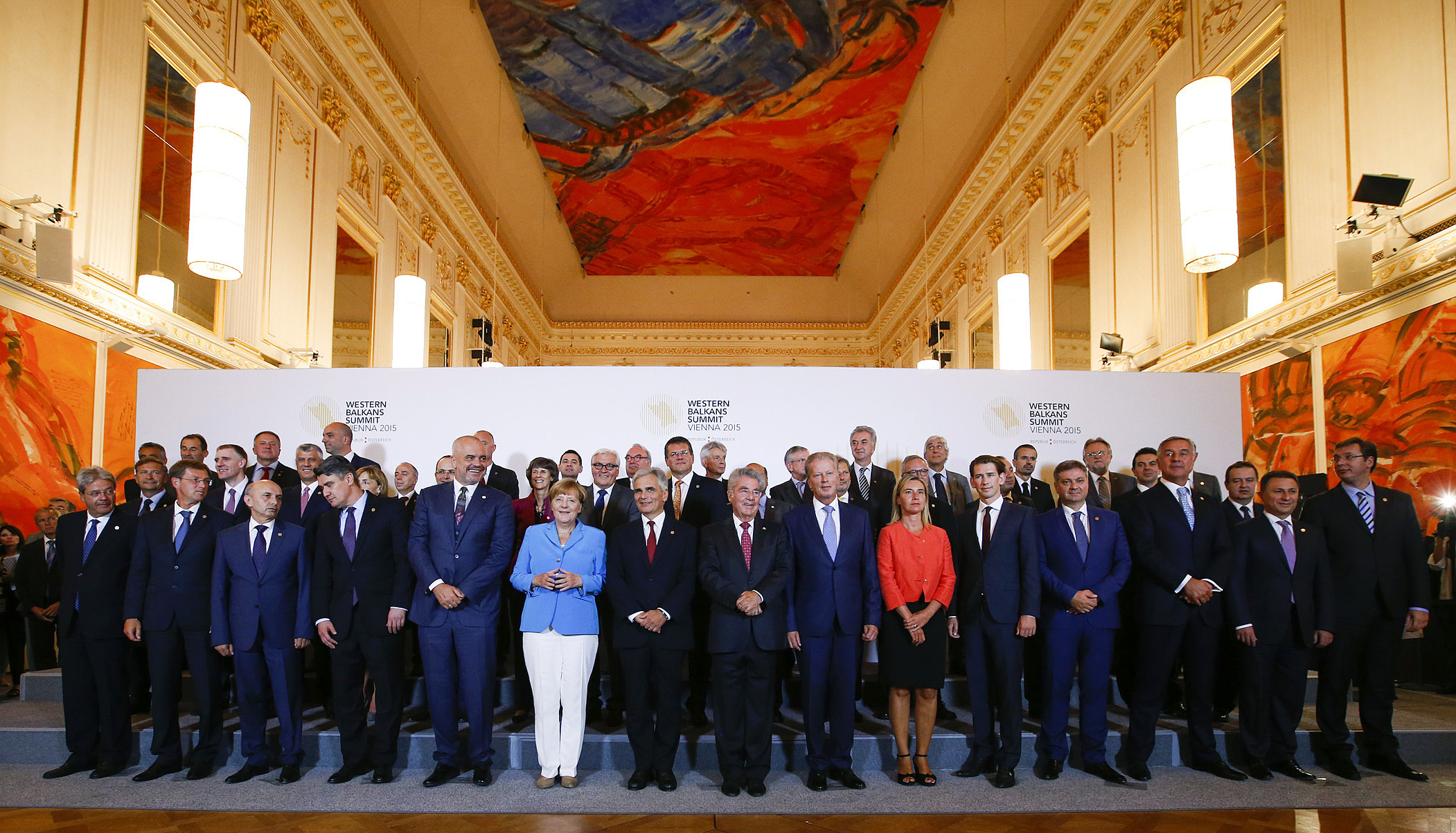
Summit Photo

The 2015 Western Balkans Summit was the second annual summit of heads of states and governments of Western Balkans. It took place in Vienna, Austria, following the 2014 Conference of Western Balkan States that took place in Berlin, Germany. This summit forms part of the Berlin Process, a five-year process marked by yearly summits in order to underline the commitment to Future enlargement of the European Union towards the Western Balkans region. Official date of summit is 27 of August 2015. After 2014 conference Günther Oettinger confirmed that the event will be organised annually with Vienna as a host city in 2015 and Paris in 2016.

The focus of the Berlin Process is on countries of the region that are not yet members of European Union (Albania, Bosnia and Herzegovina, Kosovo, Republic of Macedonia, Montenegro and Serbia) with participation of countries who have committed themselves to organise summit meetings (Germany, Austria, France and Italy) and with strong support by Slovenia and Croatia.

The conference notably overlapped with the Burgenland corpses discovery incident which influenced public attitudes towards European asylum policies.

== Regional activities before The Summit ==
Civil society initiative The Balkans in Europe Policy Advisory Group (BiEPAG) organized three preparatory meetings in Tirana, Belgrade and Sarajevo. The first preparatory meeting held in Tirana focused on job creation and prosperity. Second meeting in Belgrade took place on 25 May 2015 with aim to discuss recommendations for policy analysis ahead of the Vienna Western Balkans Summit and with topics of culture of regional cooperation, creation of jobs and prosperity, freedom of expression and bilateral disputes on agenda. Third preparatory meeting took place in Sarajevo in June 2015 with focus on freedom of expression. On the day of the Summit, civil society representatives will have the possibility to present their concrete proposals to the present politicians.

== See also ==
- Berlin Process
- Southeast Europe
- Stabilisation and Association Process
- Central European Free Trade Agreement
- Stability Pact for South Eastern Europe
