= Civic Committee for Human Rights =

Croatian non-governmental organization

The Civic Committee for Human Rights (Croatian: Građanski odbor za ljudska prava; abbreviation CCHR (English) or GOLJP (Croatian)) a non-governmental non-profit organization in Croatia. It operates since 1992 and its goal is to protect and promote human rights in Croatia.
