= 2023 Western Balkans Summit, Tirana =

Tirana Western Balkans Summit
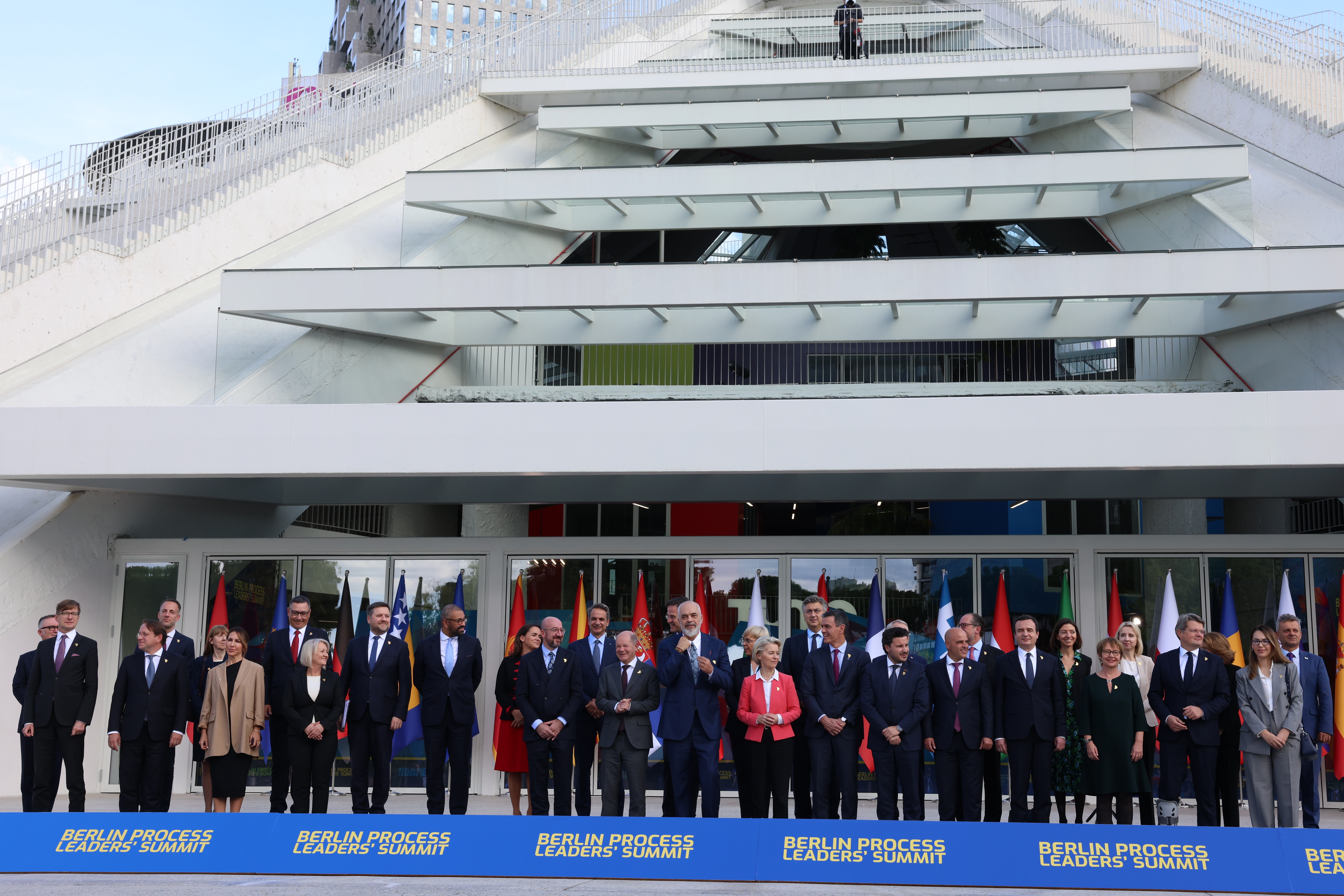
- Family photo in front of the renovated Pyramid of Tirana.
- Host country: Albania
- Dates: 16 October 2023
- Cities: Tirana
- Participants: European Union; Albania; Bosnia and Herzegovina; Germany; Greece; Kosovo; France; North Macedonia; Montenegro; Serbia
- Chair: Edi Rama
- Follows: 2022 Western Balkans Summit, Berlin

Key points

The 2023 Western Balkans Summit in Tirana, Albania was the tenth annual summit of the Berlin Process, the European Union initiative for the integration of the Western Balkans into the Union. It was the first of the Berlin Process summits to be held in a Western Balkan state.

The renovated Pyramid of Tirana was inaugurated as part of the official programme of the summit.

A follow up meeting took place in Brussels on 13 December 2023.

== Attendance ==
2023 Western Balkans summit
Country		Represented by	Title	Ref.
(Albania)	Albania	Edi Rama	Prime Minister	
(Austria)	Austria	Alexander Schallenberg	Minister for Foreign Affairs	
(Bosnia and Herzegovina)	Bosnia and Herzegovina	Borjana Krišto	Chairwoman of Council	
(Bulgaria)	Bulgaria	Nikolai Denkov	Prime Minister	
(Croatia)	Croatia	Andrej Plenković	Prime Minister	
(European Union)	European Union	Charles Michel	President	
(European Union)	European Union	Ursula von der Leyen	President	
(European Union)	European Union	Olivér Várhelyi	Commissioner	
(European Union)	European Union	Artur Lorkowski	Director of Secretariat	
(Germany)	Germany	Olaf Scholz	Chancellor	
(Greece)	Greece	Kyriakos Mitsotakis	Prime Minister	
(France)	France	Emmanuel Macron	President	
(Italy)	Italy	Antonio Tajani	Deputy Prime Minister	
(Kosovo)	Kosovo	Albin Kurti	Prime Minister	
(Montenegro)	Montenegro	Dritan Abazović	Prime Minister	
(Netherlands)	Netherlands	Mark Rutte	Prime Minister	
(North Macedonia)	North Macedonia	Dimitar Kovačevski	Prime Minister	
(Serbia)	Serbia	Ana Brnabić	Prime Minister	
(Slovenia)	Slovenia	Nataša Pirc Musar	President	
(Spain)	Spain	Pedro Sánchez	Prime Minister	

== See also ==
- Berlin Process
- Enlargement of the European Union
- Potential enlargement of the European Union
