= Berlin Process =

European intergovernmental initiative

- Participating non-EU states Participating EU states Rest of the EU
- Formation: August 28, 2014; 12 years ago
- Type: intergovernmental organization
- Members: EU states: Austria; Bulgaria; Croatia; France; Greece; Germany; Poland; Slovenia; Italy; Non-EU Balkan states: Albania; Bosnia and Herzegovina; Montenegro; Kosovo; North Macedonia; Serbia; Other non-EU states: United Kingdom
- Website: https://www.berlinprocess.de/

The Berlin Process is an intergovernmental cooperation initiative linked to the future enlargement of the European Union.

== History ==
The Berlin Process started with the 2014 Berlin Conference, which was followed by the 2015 Vienna Summit, the 2016 Paris Summit, the 2017 Trieste Summit, the 2018 London Summit and the 2019 Poznań Summit. The Berlin Process was initiated in order to consolidate and maintain the dynamics of the EU integration process in light of increased euroscepticism and the five-year moratorium on enlargement announced by Commission President Jean-Claude Juncker.

== Aims ==
The Berlin Process is aimed at revitalizing the multilateral ties between EU candidate and potential candidate countries of the former Yugoslavia and Albania and selected EU member states, and at improving regional cooperation in those countries on the issues of infrastructure and economic development. It is one of the flagship diplomatic initiatives on South-east Europe of the third Merkel cabinet. It is complemented by initiatives relating to specific South-east European countries (e.g., the German-British diplomatic initiative for Bosnia and Herzegovina's EU accession).

== Participating states ==
The initiative includes five Balkan candidates for EU membership (Montenegro, Serbia, North Macedonia, Bosnia and Herzegovina, Albania) and a non-EU Balkan potential candidate (Kosovo), nine EU members, i.e.: Austria, Bulgaria, Croatia, France, Greece, Germany, Italy, Poland, and Slovenia and one former EU member, the United Kingdom.

== Western Balkans Summit ==
- 2014 Conference of Western Balkan States, Berlin
- 2015 Western Balkans Summit, Vienna
- 2016 Western Balkans Summit, Paris
- 2017 Western Balkans Summit, Trieste
- 2018 Western Balkans Summit, London
- 2019 Western Balkans Summit, Poznań
- 2020 Western Balkans Summit, Sofia
- 2021 Western Balkans Summit, Berlin (Virtual)
- 2022 Western Balkans Summit, Berlin
- 2023 Western Balkans Summit, Tirana
- 2024 Western Balkans Summit, Berlin
- 2025 Western Balkans Summit, London
- 2026 Western Balkans Summit, Miločer

== See also ==
- Future enlargement of the European Union
  - Accession of Albania to the European Union
  - Accession of Bosnia and Herzegovina to the European Union
  - Accession of Kosovo to the European Union
  - Accession of North Macedonia to the European Union
  - Accession of Montenegro to the European Union
  - Accession of Serbia to the European Union
- Strategy for the Western Balkans
- Brdo-Brijuni Process
- Belgrade–Pristina negotiations
- Southeast Europe Transport Community
- South-East European Cooperation Process
