= List of international prime ministerial trips made by Andrej Plenković =

This is a list of international prime ministerial trips made by Andrej Plenković, the current Prime Minister of Croatia since 19 October 2016.

== Summary ==
Plenković has visited 29 countries during his tenure as prime minister. The number of visits per country where Plenković has traveled are:

- One visit to Armenia, Austria, Bosnia and Herzegovina, Canada, Cyprus, Czech Republic, Denmark, Estonia, Hungary, Iceland, India, Ireland, Italy, Japan, Kosovo, Moldova, the North Macedonia and the United States.
- Two visits to Greece and Poland
- Three visits to Albania, Slovenia, and Switzerland
- Five visits to the United Kingdom and Vatican City
- Eight visits to Germany
- Nine visits to France and Ukraine
- Twenty-three visits to Belgium

== 2016 ==
Country	Location(s)	Dates	Details
Belgium	Brussels	20 October	Attended the first European Council summit. In an address to the Croatian Parliament, Plenković said that "there is no need for Croatia to build border fences".
Bosnia and Herzegovina	Sarajevo	28 October	It was his first official foreign visit. He said that his government will support Bosnia and Herzegovina on its path towards membership in the European Union. Discussions were held regarding the political rights of Bosnian Croats, mostly in terms of bringing their political rights to the level enjoyed by Bosniaks and Bosnian Serbs.
Ukraine	Kyiv	20 November	Met with Prime Minister Volodymyr Groysman. Plenković expressed support for a peaceful reintegration of the areas of Ukraine under the control of pro-Russian rebels. The two governments established a working group to share Croatia's experience with the reintegration of eastern Slavonia in 1998.

== 2017 ==
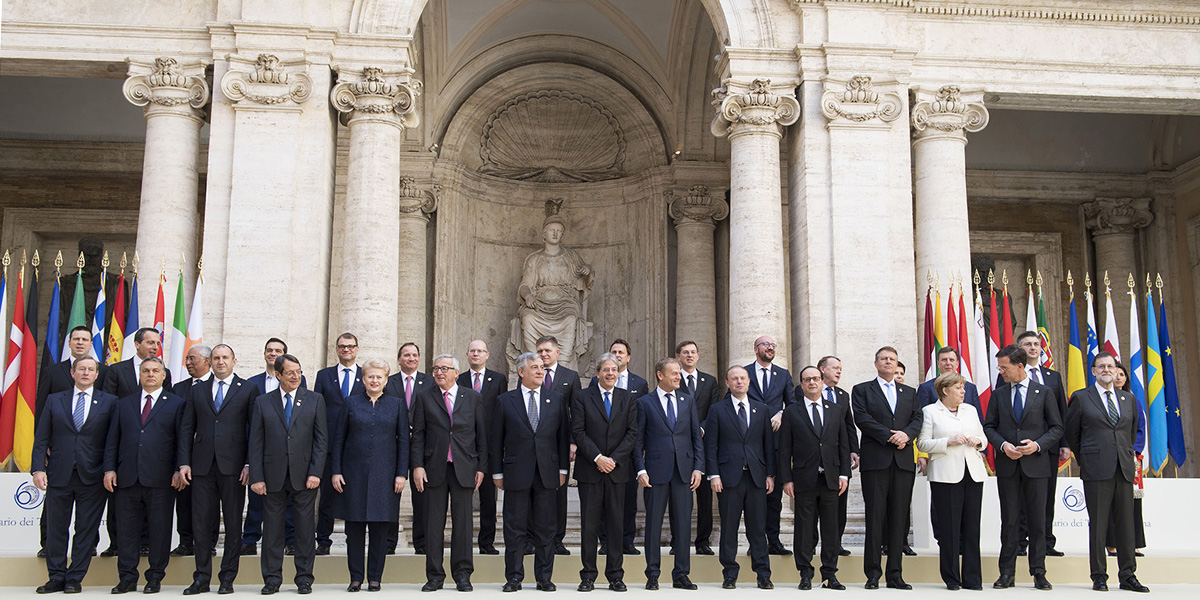
Treaty of Rome anniversary group photograph 2017-03-25 03

Country	Location(s)	Dates	Details
Vatican City	Vatican City	24 March	Plenković visits the Vatican with his 27 EU-counterparts.
Italy	Rome	25 March	Plenković attends the Rome Treaty celebration.
Belgium	Brussels	22 June	Attended the EPP summit.
Vatican City	Vatican City	7 October	Met with Pope Francis to discuss strong Holy See–Croatia ties, the Church's role in society, Cardinal Stepinac's legacy, EU prospects, and Croats’ situation in Bosnia-Herzegovina.

== 2018 ==
Country	Location(s)	Dates	Details
Belgium	Brussels	28–29 June	Plenković attended the European Council.
France	Paris	15–16 October	Working visit. Met with President Emmanuel Macron.

== 2019 ==
Country	Location(s)	Dates	Details
Belgium	Brussels	21 March	Attended European People's Party summit.
Belgium	Brussels	2 July	Plenković attended attended an extraordinary European Council.
Poland	Warsaw	4 July	Met with Prime Minister Mateusz Morawiecki.
United Kingdom	London, Watford	3–4 December	Plenković travelled to Watford to attend the 30th NATO summit.

== 2020 ==
Country	Location(s)	Dates	Details
France	Paris	7 January	Met with President Emmanuel Macron. They thoroughly discussed further steps concerning the Multiannual Financial Framework (MFF), preparations for the EU-Western Balkans summit in Zagreb in May, enlargement issues, Brexit, preparations for the Conference on the Future of Europe and our bilateral relations
Vatican City	Vatican City	6 February	Met with Pope Francis to discuss strong bilateral ties, Croatia's EU Council presidency, European challenges, Croats in Bosnia, migration, peace, and security.
Germany	Munich	16 February	Attended the Munich Security Conference.
United Kingdom	London	24 February	Met with Prime Minister Boris Johnson in 10 Downing Street. They discussed the UK's future relationship with the EU, and spoke about shared priorities such as climate change, defence, security and links between our people.
Belgium	Brussels	1–2 October	Plenković attended an extraordinary European Council.

== 2021 ==
Country	Location(s)	Dates	Details
Belgium	Brussels	11 March	Travelled to NATO headquarters to meet with Secretary General of NATO Jens Stoltenberg.
Austria	Vienna	24 June	Attended the EPP summit.
Ukraine	Kyiv	23–24 August	Attended Crimea Platform and Kyiv Independence Day Parade.
Greece	Athens	17 September	Attended the first MED9 meeting after Croatia joined.
Slovenia	Ljubljana	5–6 October	Plenković attended an informal European Council and the EU-Western Balkans summit.
Belgium	Brussels	21–22 October	Plenković attended the European Council and the EPP summit.
United Kingdom	Glasgow	1–2 November	Plenković travelled to Glasgow to attend the 2021 United Nations Climate Change Conference.
Kosovo	Pristina	15 November	Met with Prime Minister Albin Kurti. He said that Croatia would help Kosovo on the path to European integration and visa liberalisation. Currently, Kosovo is not a candidate country and, despite promises, does not enjoy visa liberalisation for its citizens.
Ukraine	Kyiv	8 December	Plenković travelled to Kyiv during the Prelude to the 2022 Russian invasion of Ukraine to meet with President Volodymyr Zelenskyy. Both have signed a joint Declaration on the European perspective of our country.

== 2022 ==
Country	Location(s)	Dates	Details
Germany	Munich	18–20 February	Attended the 58th Munich Security Conference.
Belgium	Brussels	24 February	Plenković attended a special meeting of the European Council to discuss the Russian invasion of Ukraine.
France	Versailles	10–11 March	Participation in the informal meeting of EU Heads of State and Government.
Belgium	Brussels	24 March	Attended the European Council. Met with U. S. President Joe Biden and other leaders.
Ukraine	Kyiv	8 May	Met with President Volodymyr Zelenskyy. They discussed with the prime minister of Croatia the strengthening of sanctions, cooperation in the security, energy and European integration spheres.
Germany	Berlin	1 June	Met with Chancellor Olaf Scholz. The talks were focus on a common position regarding the ongoing Russian war of aggression against Ukraine, the EU perspective of the Western Balkan states, and other European, foreign policy, and economic issues.
Czech Republic	Prague	6–7 October	Plenković attended at Prague Castle the 1st European Political Community Summit and an informal European Council.
Albania	Tirana	6 December	Attended the EU-Western Balkans summit

== 2023 ==
Country	Location(s)	Dates	Details
Estonia	Tallinn	12 January	Met with Prime Minister Kaja Kallas, President of the Republic Alar Karis and President of the Riigikogu Jüri Ratas. The prime minister of Croatia will also visit the e-Estonia Briefing Centre.
Switzerland	Davos	19 January	Attended the World Economic Forum. Met with Azerbaijani President Ilham Aliyev.
Germany	Munich	17–19 February	Attended the 59th Munich Security Conference.
Slovenia	Brdo pri Kranju	28 March	Met with Prime Minister Robert Golob to discuss energy, migration and economic cooperation.
Ukraine	Kyiv, Bucha	31 March	Plenković together with Slovak prime minister Eduard Heger and Slovenian prime minister Robert Golob arrived in Ukraine on the anniversary of the liberation of Bucha. Met with President Volodymyr Zelenskyy
North Macedonia	Skopje	5 April	Met with Prime Minister Dimitar Kovačevski. They discussed bilateral relations, further improvement of economic cooperation and the country's European path. The decision to open negotiations on the accession of North Macedonia to the European Union was made during the first Croatian presidency of the Council of the European Union, he said that now is the time to speed up these negotiations, in which Croatia will help with its knowledge and experience.
Iceland	Reykjavík	16–17 May	Plenković attended the 4th Council of Europe summit.
Moldova	Bulboaca	1 June	Plenković attended the second summit of the European Political Community.
Belgium	Brussels	29 June	Attended European People's Party summit. Met with President of the European Commission Ursula von der Leyen.
Belgium	Brussels	17-18 July	Attended the 3rd EU–CELAC summit.
Greece	Athens	21 August	Attended Ukraine-South East Europe summit.
Spain	Granada	5–6 October	Plenković attended the 3rd European Political Community Summit
Albania	Tirana	16 October	Attended Western Balkans Summit.
Belgium	Brussels	13–15 December	Plenković attended the EU-Western Balkans summit followed by the European Council.

== 2024 ==
Country	Location(s)	Dates	Details
France	Paris	5 January	Plenković attended the commemoration ceremony of Jacques Delors.
Germany	Munich	16–18 February	Attended the 60th Munich Security Conference.
Belgium	Brussels	21 March	Plenković attended the European Council summit.
Switzerland	Lucerne	15–16 June	Plenković travelled to Nidwalden to attend the Global peace summit.
Belgium	Brussels	17 June	Plenković attended an informal European Council summit.
United Kingdom	Woodstock	18 July	Plenković attended the 4th European Political Community Summit
France	Paris	26 July	Plenković travelled to Paris to attend the 2024 Summer Olympics opening ceremony.
Ukraine	Kyiv	11 September	Met with President Volodymyr Zelenskyy. They discussed humanitarian demining of contaminated territories. The Head of State commended Croatia's leading role in this process and thanked for the initiative to hold donor conferences on mine clearance.
Hungary	Budapest	7 November	Plenković attended the 5th European Political Community Summit
Belgium	Brussels	18 December	Met with Secretary General of NATO Mark Rutte in NATO headquarters. They discussed Croatia's role in NATO's deterrence and defence, the Western Balkans, and support for Ukraine.

== 2025 ==
Country	Location(s)	Dates	Details
Germany	Berlin	17–18 January	Attended the EPP Leaders’ Retreat. He also met with leader of the opposition and leader of the Christian Democratic Union, Friedrich Merz.
Switzerland	Davos	22 January	Attended the Annual meeting of the World Economic Forum.
Poland	Oświęcim	27 January	Plenković attended the commemoration of the 80th anniversary of the liberation of the Auschwitz concentration camp.
Belgium	Brussels	3 February	Plenković attended an informal European Council summit.
Germany	Munich	14–16 February	Attended the 61st Munich Security Conference.
Belgium	Brussels	20 March	Participation in the European Council working session.
France	Paris	27 March	Plenković attended a meeting of the "Coalition of the willing" hosted by President Macron.
Vatican City	Vatican City	26 April	Plenković attended the funeral of Pope Francis.
Albania	Tirana	16 May	Plenković attended the 6th European Political Community Summit.
Vatican City	Vatican City	18 May	Plenković attended Papal inauguration of Pope Leo XIV.
Ukraine	Odesa	11 June	Attended the fourth Ukraine-South East Europe summit
Belgium	Brussels	26–27 June	Plenković attended the European Council meeting.
Japan	Tokyo	19 September	Met with Prime Minister Shigeru Ishiba. The two prime ministers confirmed the excellent political relations between Croatia and Japan, and advocated for further strengthening of economic cooperation and mutual investments. At Akasaka Palace, the prime minister met with Crown Prince Akishino, and also met with representatives of the Japanese Business Federation and members of the Japanese Parliament.
Denmark	Copenhagen	1–2 October	Plenković attended the 7th European Political Community Summit.
Slovenia	Portorož	20 October	Attended the MED9 summit.
United Kingdom	London	22 October	Attended Western Balkans Summit and met with Prime Minister Keir Starmer.
France	Paris	8–10 December	Met with President Emmanuel Macron at Elysee Palace. They discussed issues that will concern all EU members in the coming period: competitiveness, migration, the European budget, but also the enlargement of the European Union to the Western Balkans, the most important international issues, especially the Russian aggression against Ukraine.
Germany	Berlin	10 December	Attends a press conference with Friedrich Merz.

== 2026 ==
Country	Location(s)	Dates	Details
France	Paris	6 January	Plenković attended the Coalition of the Willing meeting in Paris with fellow leaders.
Belgium	Antwerp, Rijkhoven	11–12 February	Plenković attended the 3rd European Industry Summit. Next day participated in the informal meeting of EU heads of state and government.
India	New Delhi	17–20 February	Attended AI Impact Summit.
Ukraine	Kyiv	24 February	Plenković travelled to Kyiv to mark the fourth anniversary of the Russian invasion of Ukraine.
Belgium	Brussels	19–20 March	Plenković attended the European Council.
Cyprus	Nicosia	23–24 April	Plenković attended an informal meeting of the European Council summit.
Armenia	Yerevan	3–4 May	Plenković attended the 8th European Political Community Summit.
Belgium	Brussels	18–19 June	Attended the European Council.
Canada	Ottawa, Toronto, Norval, Hamilton	22–24 June	Plenković paid an official visit to Canada, where he met with Canadian prime minister Mark Carney in Ottawa. The leaders discussed bilateral relations, trade and investment, defence cooperation, transatlantic security, and continued support for Ukraine. They also welcomed closer cooperation in areas including energy, critical minerals, advanced technologies, and the defence industry. During the visit, Plenković participated in engagements with the Croatian diaspora and business community in Ontario and discussed opportunities to expand economic and cultural ties between Croatia and Canada. The programme also included meetings with Canadian officials and attendance at events related to the 2026 FIFA World Cup.
France	Paris	13–14 July	Plenković travelled to Paris to attend a meeting with heads of state and government within the Coalition of the Willing. Plenković attended Bastille Day celebrations.
Ukraine	Kyiv	15 July	Attended the 5th Ukraine-Southeast Europe Summit.
United States	New York City	22 September	Plenković attended the 81st United Nations General Assembly.
Belgium	Brussels	15–16 October	Plenković attended the European Council.
Ireland	Dublin	12 November	Plenkovic attended the 9th European Political Community Summit.

== Future trips ==
Country	Location	Date	Details
Turkey	Antalya	November	Plenkovic is scheduled to attend the 2026 United Nations Climate Change Conference.

== Multilateral meetings ==
Andrej Plenković participated in the following summits during his premiership:

Group	Year									
Group	2019	2020	2021	2022	2023	2024	2025	2026	2027	2028
EU–CELAC	None				17–18 July, (Belgium) Brussels	None	9–10 November, (Colombia) Santa Marta	None		
EPC	Didn't exist			6 October, (Czech Republic) Prague	1 June, (Moldova) Bulboaca	18 July, (United Kingdom) Woodstock	16 May, (Albania) Tirana	4 May, (Armenia) Yerevan	TBD, (Switzerland) TBD	TBD, (Azerbaijan) TBD
EPC	Didn't exist			6 October, (Czech Republic) Prague	5 October, (Spain) Granada	7 November, (Hungary) Budapest	2 October, (Denmark) Copenhagen	12 November, (Republic of Ireland) Dublin	TBD, (Greece) TBD	TBD, (Latvia) TBD
UNCCC	2–13 December (Spain) Madrid	none	1–2 November (United Kingdom) Glasgow	11 November (Egypt) Sharm el-Sheikh	30 November – 3 December (United Arab Emirates) Dubai	12 November (Azerbaijan) Baku	10 November, (Brazil) Belém	TBD	TBD	TBD
Others	NATO; 3–4 December, (United Kingdom) Watford	None				Global Peace Summit; 15–16 June (Switzerland) Lucerne	Building a robust peace for Ukraine and Europe; 27 March, (France) Paris	Together for peace and security summit 6 January, (France) Paris	TBA	TBA
Others	NATO; 3–4 December, (United Kingdom) Watford	None				Global Peace Summit; 15–16 June (Switzerland) Lucerne	Building a robust peace for Ukraine and Europe; 27 March, (France) Paris	Determined to act 13 July, (France) Paris	TBA	TBA
