= NATO headquarters (disambiguation) =

NATO headquarters is the headquarters of the North Atlantic Treaty Organization in Brussels, Belgium.

NATO headquarters may also refer to:

- Supreme Headquarters Allied Powers Europe, the headquarters of the North Atlantic Treaty Organization's Allied Command Operations (ACO), located at Casteau, Belgium
- Allied Command Transformation, a military command of the North Atlantic Treaty Organization, located in Norfolk, Virginia
