= List of international prime ministerial trips made by Kiril Petkov =

This is a list of international prime ministerial trips made by Kiril Petkov, who served as the Prime Minister of Bulgaria from 13 December 2021 to 2 August 2022.

== Summary ==
Petkov has visited 11 countries during his tenure as prime minister. The number of visits per country where Petkov has traveled are:

- One visit to Azerbaijan, France, Germany, Greece, Italy, the North Macedonia, Switzerland, Ukraine, the United States and Vatican City.
- Three visits to Belgium

== 2021 ==
| Country | Location(s) | Dates | Details |
|---|---|---|---|
| Belgium | Brussels | 16–17 December | First foreign visit. Meetings with European Commission president Ursula von der Leyen, European Council president Charles Michel, and NATO Secretary General Jens Stoltenberg. |

== 2022 ==
| Country | Location(s) | Dates | Details |
|---|---|---|---|
| North Macedonia | Skopje | 18 January | Met with Prime Minister Dimitar Kovačevski as both new prime ministers, seeking to improve relations talks and discussing EU negotiations and other issues to be resolved. Five months later, on 24 June 2022, Bulgaria's parliament approved the lifting of the country's veto on opening EU accession talks with North Macedonia. |
| Germany | Munich | 18–20 February | Attended the 58th Munich Security Conference. Bilateral meetings with Ukrainian president Volodymyr Zelenskyy to sign a joint declaration in support of Ukraine's European perspective. As regards the Russia-Ukraine situation, Petkov and Zelenskyy shared their concerns about energy security while they expressed a hope for the de-escalation of tension in the region. with Georgia's prime minister Irakli Garibashvili. They discussed the opportunities for economic cooperation in information technology, coordination of logistics within the Black Sea and support for Georgia's Euro-Atlantic course. On the second day of the Munich Security Conference continues with bilateral meetings with Kosovo's prime minister Albin Kurti and with Google's vice president for Government Affairs and Public Policy in Europe Annette Kroeber-Riel. |
| France | Versailles | 10–11 March | Participation in the informal meeting of EU Heads of State and Government. |
| Belgium | Brussels | 24–25 March | Participation in an emergency NATO summit and a meeting of the European Council. A joint meeting of EU leaders with US president Joe Biden to coordinate the response to Russia's invasion of Ukraine. |
| Ukraine | Kyiv, Irpin, Borodyanka | 28 April | Solidarity visit as part of the coalition government delegation. Meeting with Volodymyr Zelenskyy; signing of a declaration on support for Ukraine's European perspective. |
| United States | Washington, D. C. | 9–11 May | Talks with Vice President Kamala Harris in White House and Secretary of State Antony Blinken. The main topic is energy security and LNG supplies following the shutdown of Russian gas supplies to Bulgaria. |
| Italy | Rome | 22–23 May | Met with his prime minister Mario Draghi, as well as with a delegation from North Macedonia led by Prime Minister Dimitar Kovacevski. |
| Vatican City | Vatican City | 23 May | Met with Pope Francis. |
| Switzerland | Davos | 24–26 May | Participation in the World Economic Forum. Discussion of energy diversification in the Balkans and regional infrastructure. |
| Belgium | Brussels | 23 June | Petkov attended in Brussels an EU-Western Balkans Leaders meeting, and a European Council. |
| Greece | Komotini | 8 July | Participation in the completion ceremony of the IGB gas interconnector together with Prime Minister Kyriakos Mitsotakis. |
| Azerbaijan | Baku | 21–22 July | Meeting with President Ilham Aliyev to discuss increasing the volume of Azerbaijani gas supplies. |
