= 59th Munich Security Conference =

Diplomatic meeting

59th Munich Security Conference Münchner Sicherheitskonferenz
- Nickname: MSC 2023
- Begins: 17 February 2023
- Ends: 19 February 2023
- Venue: Hotel Bayerischer Hof
- Locations: Munich, Germany
- Previous event: 58th (2022)
- Next event: 60th (2024)

The 59th Munich Security Conference (MSC 2023) took place from 17 to 19 February 2023 at the Hotel Bayerischer Hof in Munich.

== Attendees ==
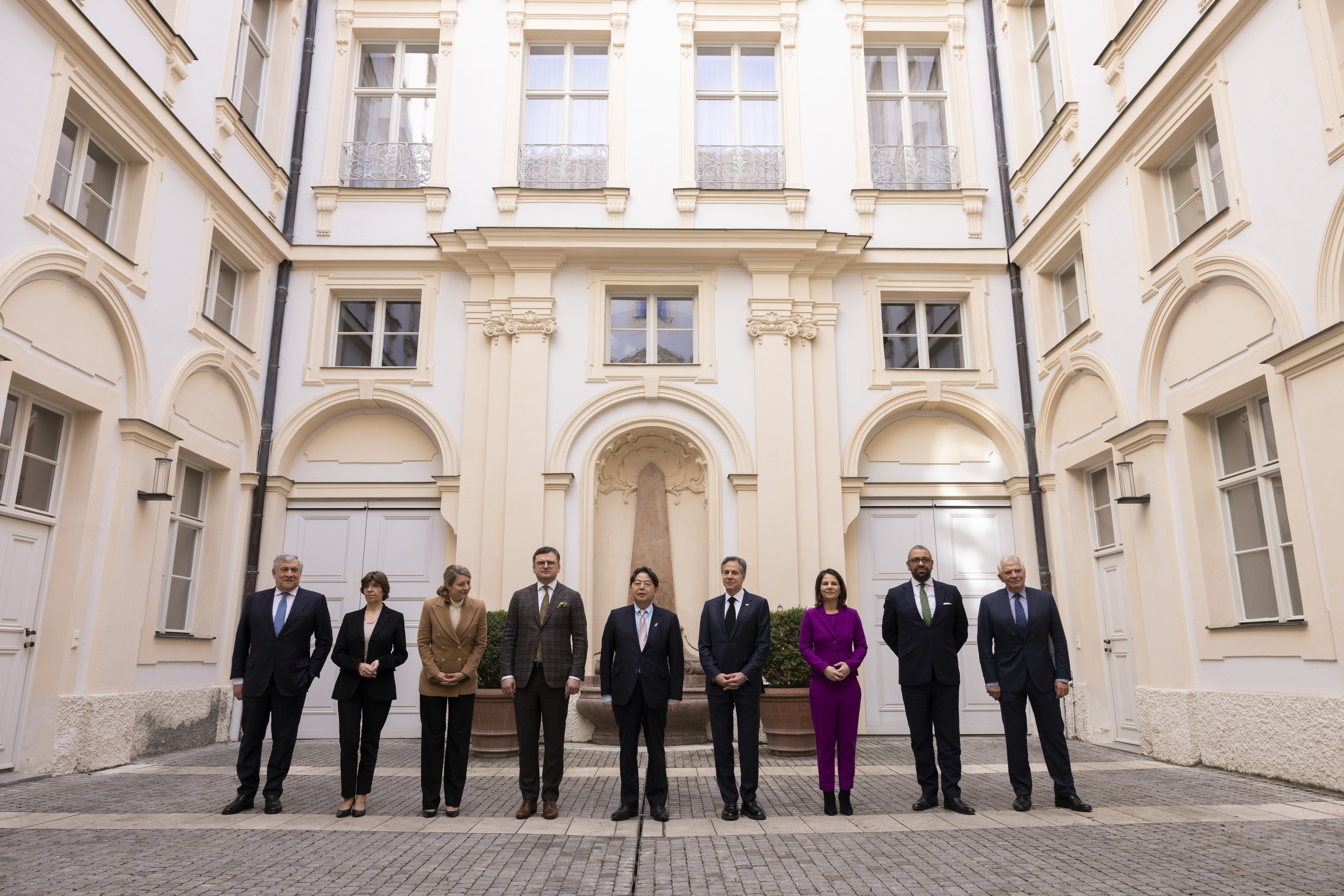
G7 Foreign Ministers at the 59th MSC.

Participants included the following political representatives:

- (Germany) Olaf Scholz, Chancellor
- (Germany) Robert Habeck, Vice-chancellor
- (United States) Kamala Harris, Vice President
- (United States) Antony Blinken, Secretary of State
- (Canada) Mélanie Joly, Foreign Minister
- (France) Emmanuel Macron, President
- (Germany) Annalena Baerbock, Minister for Foreign Affairs
- (Germany) Boris Pistorius, Minister of Defence
- (European Union) Ursula von der Leyen, President of the European Commission
- Jens Stoltenberg, NATO Secretary General
- Wang Yi, Chinese Communist Party Politburo foreign chief and Foreign Minister of China
- (Poland) Andrzej Duda, President
- (Colombia) Francia Márquez, Vice President
- (Estonia) Kaja Kallas, Prime Minister
- (Ghana) Nana Akufo-Addo, President
- (Ukraine) Vitali Klitschko, Mayor of Kyiv
- (Ukraine) Volodymyr Zelenskyy, President (virtually).
- (Ukraine) Dmytro Kuleba, Minister of Foreign Affairs
- (Ukraine) Oleksii Reznikov, Minister of Defence
- (United Kingdom) Rishi Sunak, Prime Minister
- Reza Pahlavi, former Crown Prince of Iran
- (Azerbaijan) Ilham Aliyev, President
- (Montenegro) Milo Đukanović, President
- (Latvia) Egils Levits, President
- (Lithuania) Gitanas Nausėda, President
- (Kosovo) Vjosa Osmani, President
- (North Macedonia) Stevo Pendarovski, President
- (Slovenia) Nataša Pirc Musar, President
- (Bulgaria) Rumen Radev, President
- (Moldova) Maia Sandu, President
- (Denmark) Mette Frederiksen, Prime Minister
- (United States) Bill Gates, American entrepreneur
- (Sweden) Ulf Kristersson, Prime Minister
- (Finland) Sanna Marin, Prime Minister
- (United States) Michael McCaul, Chair of the House Foreign Affairs Committee
- (Italy) Giorgia Meloni, Prime Minister
- (Greece) Kyriakos Mitsotakis, Prime Minister
- (United States) Phil Murphy, Governor of New Jersey
- (Norway) Jonas Gahr Støre, Prime Minister
- (Belgium) Alexander De Croo, Prime Minister
- (Tunisia) Najla Bouden Romdhane, Prime Minister
- (Iraq) Mohammed Shia' al-Sudani, Prime Minister
- (Georgia (country)) Irakli Gharibashvili, Prime Minister
- (North Macedonia) Dimitar Kovačevski, Prime Minister
- (Namibia) Saara Kuugongelwa-Amadhila, Prime Minister
- (Armenia) Nikol Pashinyan, Prime Minister
- (Croatia) Andrej Plenković, Prime Minister
- (Albania) Edi Rama, Prime Minister
- (Serbia) Aleksandar Vučić, President

== Overview ==
The conference was dominated by the ongoing Russo-Ukrainian War. Vladimir Putin and his 2022 Russian invasion of Ukraine were discussed by most of the speakers but he was not invited and did not attend. The New York Times reported that the world was tense and fractured as the West also faced confrontation with China and a global South "often dismissive of perceived Western hypocrisy and not always persuaded by the West’s moral indignation over the invasion of Ukraine".

Director of the Central Foreign Affairs Commission Office of the Chinese Communist Party (CCP) Wang Yi announced his peace initiative for the 2022 Russian invasion of Ukraine. On the same day US Vice President Kamala Harris urged China not to arm Russia, while she announced that the US "has determined Russia has committed crimes against humanity in Ukraine." US Secretary of State Antony Blinken was adamant that "Any peace has to be consistent with the principles of the United Nations Charter."

Newly minted German Minister of Defence Boris Pistorius witnessed unity which gave him hope about the events in Ukraine:

What I see is a very, very strong unity, the very strong commitment in joint commitment that we want, and we will support Ukraine as long as it takes. And this is very important, a very important signal for the Ukrainian people, which really fights a very, very admirable fight against Russian aggression.

Mikhail Khodorkovsky and Garry Kasparov were invited along with several other guests to discuss "Russia Reimagined: Visions for a Democratic Future".

During multiple panel discussions, Vice President of Colombia Francia Márquez and Foreign Minister of Brazil Mauro Vieira concurred in their condemnation of the Russian aggression, but also stated their opposition to a further militarization of the conflict. Márquez called for a new world order, centering life and not militarisation, while Vieira stated that it is necessary to work step by step towards a negotiated settlement in the Russo-Ukrainian war.

At a panel on Iran and the Women, Life, Freedom protests the son of the deposed Shah, Reza Pahlavi, was invited to share his vision for the future of Iran. The International Business Times comments that he has no experience, and is trying to "pluck the fruits of others labor".
