= NATO Star =

Sculpture in Brussels

- La Rose des Vents (French)
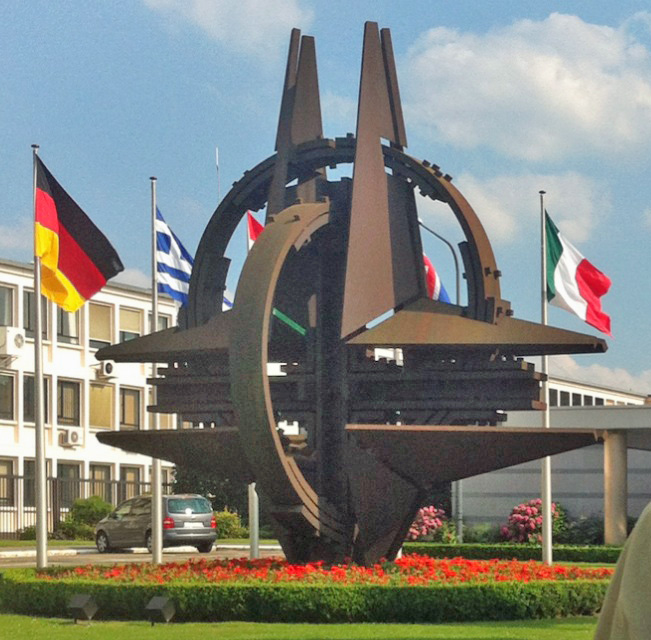
- Location outside NATO's previous headquarters
- Artist: Raymond Huyberechts
- Year: 1971
- Medium: Factory-oxidised steel
- Dimensions: 700 cm × 700 cm (280 in × 280 in)
- Weight: 6 tonnes
- Location: NATO headquarters, City of Brussels, Belgium; 50°52′43.8″N 4°25′34″E
- Owner: North Atlantic Treaty Organization

The NATO Star is a sculpture situated in the court of honor of the North Atlantic Treaty Organization's (NATO) headquarters in Brussels, Belgium, designed by Belgian architect and sculptor, Raymond Huyberechts.

The sculpture was unveiled in 1971. It symbolises the bond between Europe and North America, and is inspired by the alliance's flag, which was introduced in 1953.

At NATO's old headquarters, the star was surrounded by the flags of the NATO member countries. When NATO moved to its new headquarters, the star moved across the Boulevard Léopold III/Leopold III-laan to its new home on Saturday 28 May 2016.

== History ==
In 1967, NATO moved to Brussels, Belgium, to headquarters that were initially defined as temporary, and therefore no Court of Honor was planned. Only when the organization's political decision-making body, the North Atlantic Council (NAC), decided in late 1969 to make the site the organization's permanent home, did the question arise regarding the design of the empty courtyard at the main entrance to the building. The organization established a working group for this purpose, which rejected the initial proposal to construct a roof at the site. Instead, the group approached and commissioned consulting architects to find an alternative. Following a proposal by the Greek representative in the group, Belgian architect Raymond Huybrechtse designed a motif inspired by NATO's emblem – a compass rose surrounded by a circle and four lines extending from it – representing Europe and America. The motif was supported by the Council when presented at its meeting on 17 March 1970, and the sculpture was budgeted at 1.5 million Belgian francs.

The sculpture was erected in mid-August 1971, and on 10 September, a dedication ceremony was held at the organization's headquarters. On 1 October, the 5th Secretary-General of NATO, Joseph Luns, became the first SG to be photographed with the sculpture. Since then, the sculpture has become a popular tourist attraction. It serves as a backdrop for both official and unofficial photographs.

The sculpture was featured alongside the NATO flag on a stamp issued in a special edition by the Belgian postal service on 31 March 1979, to commemorate the 30th anniversary of the alliance. On 11 October 2016, the stamp was featured again on a Belgian stamp in a special edition, issued to mark the alliance's jubilee. The commemorative stamp depicted the front of the new NATO headquarters (finally inaugurated on 25 May 2017) with a similar square in front, centered around the sculpture, crowned with the flags of member countries. With the inauguration of the new headquarters and the relocation of the sculpture, the symbolic square was not fully reconstructed and the flags no longer crown the sculpture.

== Gallery ==
Compass rose depicted in the NATO flag

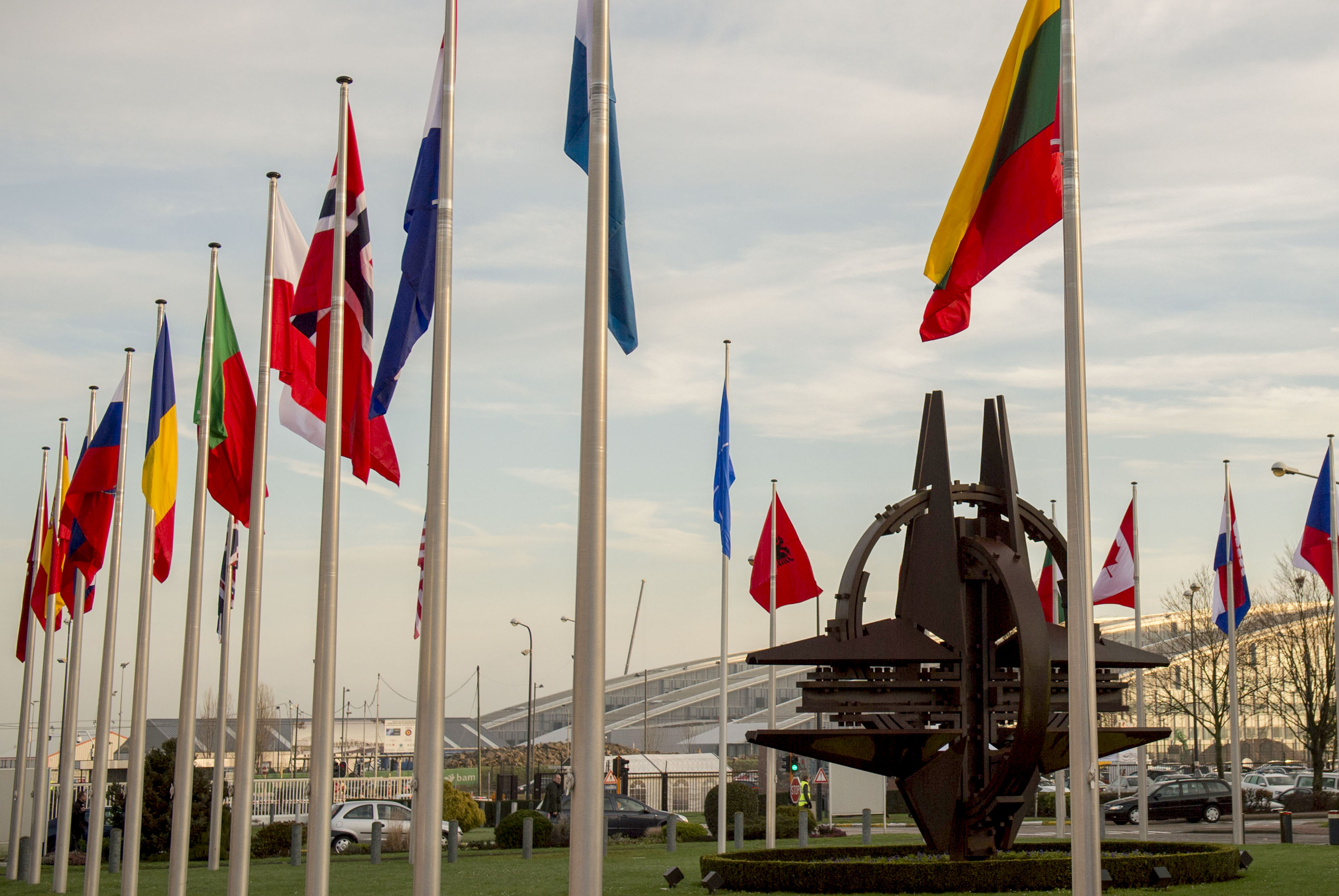
NATO Star sculpture at the previous NATO headquarters

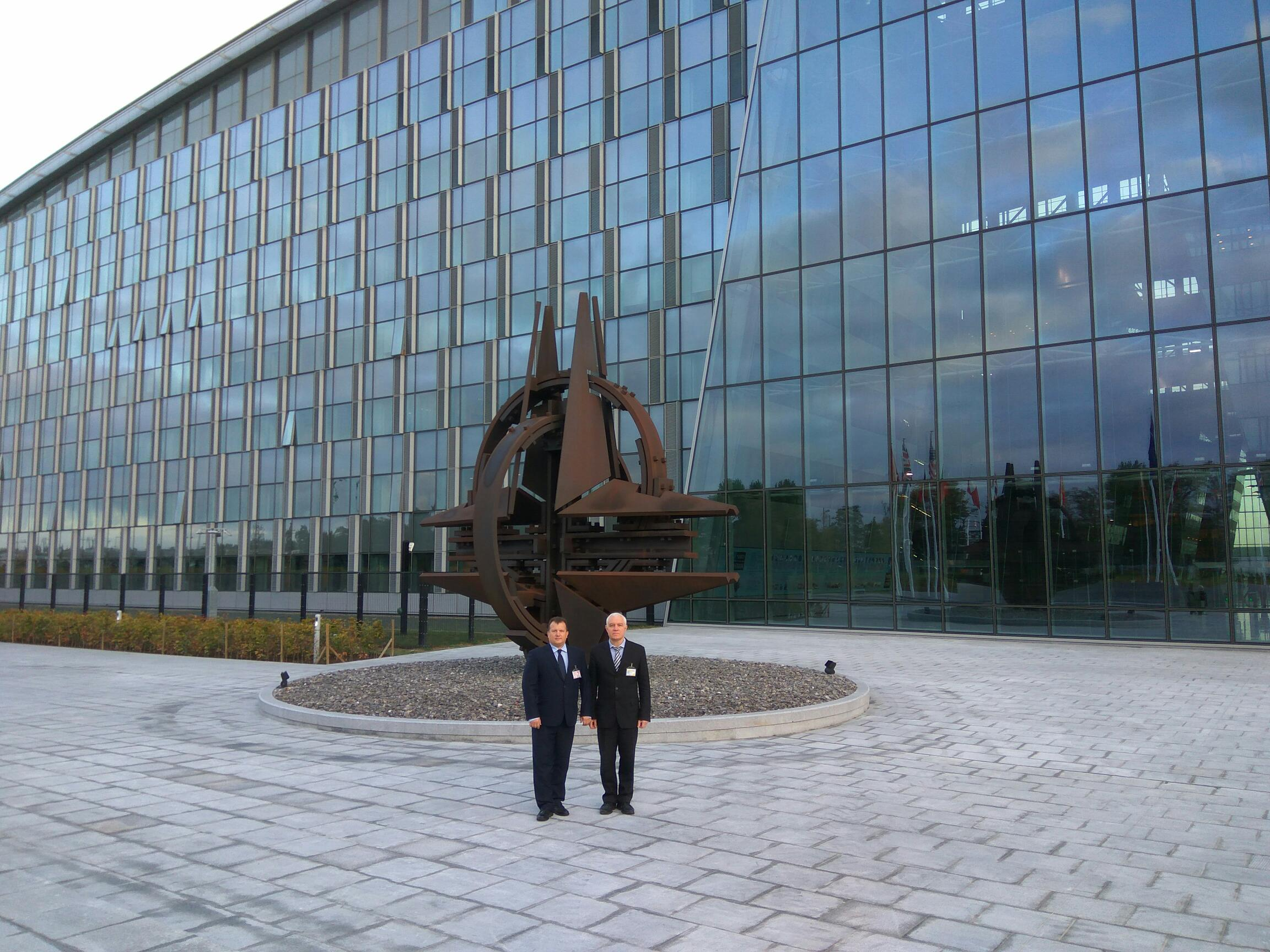
Present location, 2018

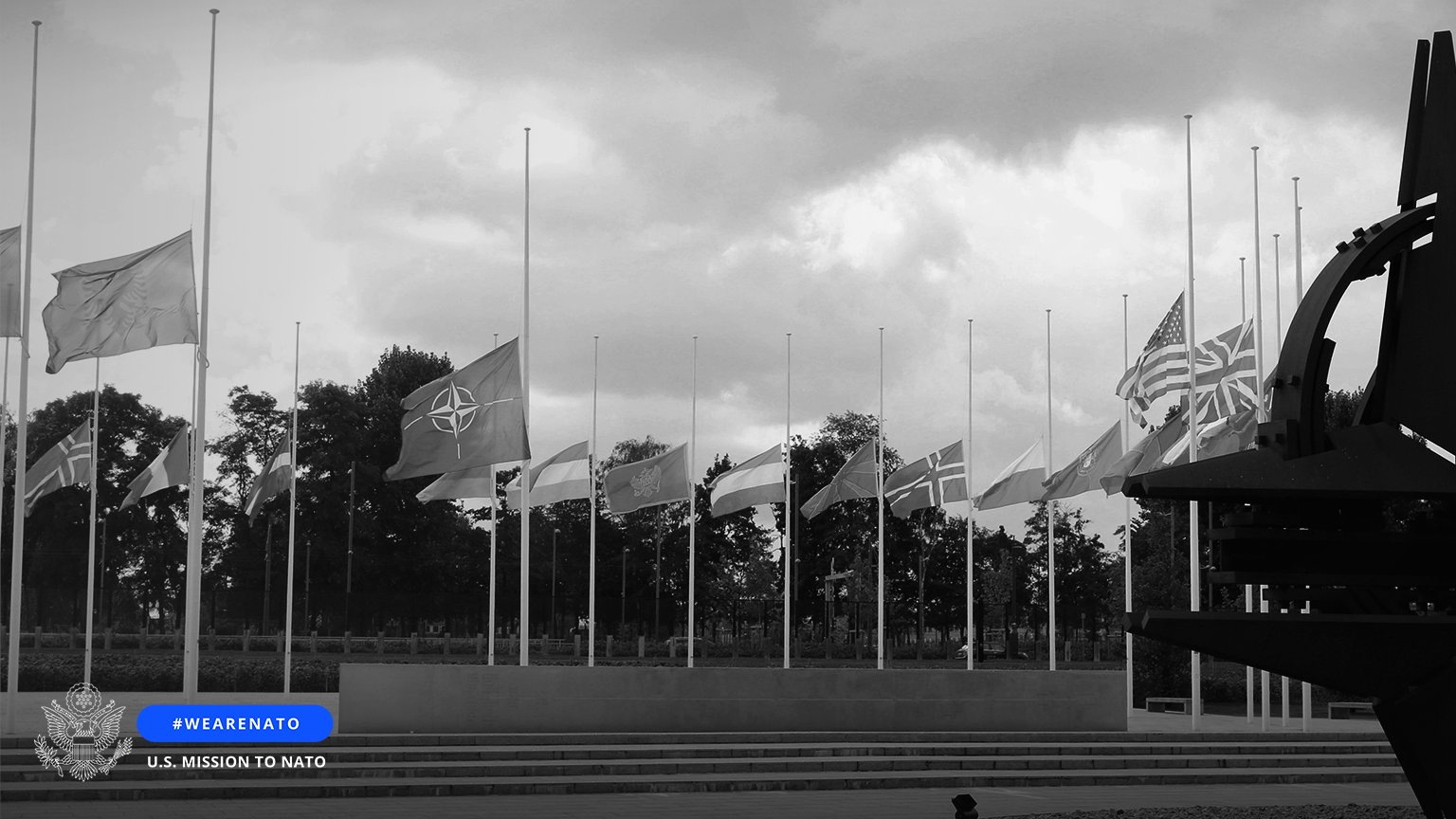
The flags in front of the NATO Star are lowered to half-mast the day after the 2021 Kabul airport attack in which 13 members of the United States Armed Forces were killed, August 27, 2021

== See also ==
- NATO headquarters
- Flag of NATO
