= 60th Munich Security Conference =

Diplomatic meeting

60th Munich Security Conference Münchner Sicherheitskonferenz
- Nickname: MSC 2024
- Begins: 16 February 2024
- Ends: 18 February 2024
- Venue: Hotel Bayerischer Hof
- Locations: Munich, Germany
- Previous event: 59th (2023)
- Next event: 61st (2025)

The 60th Munich Security Conference (MSC 2024) was the annual meeting of the Munich Security Conference from 16 to 18 February 2024.

== Attendees ==
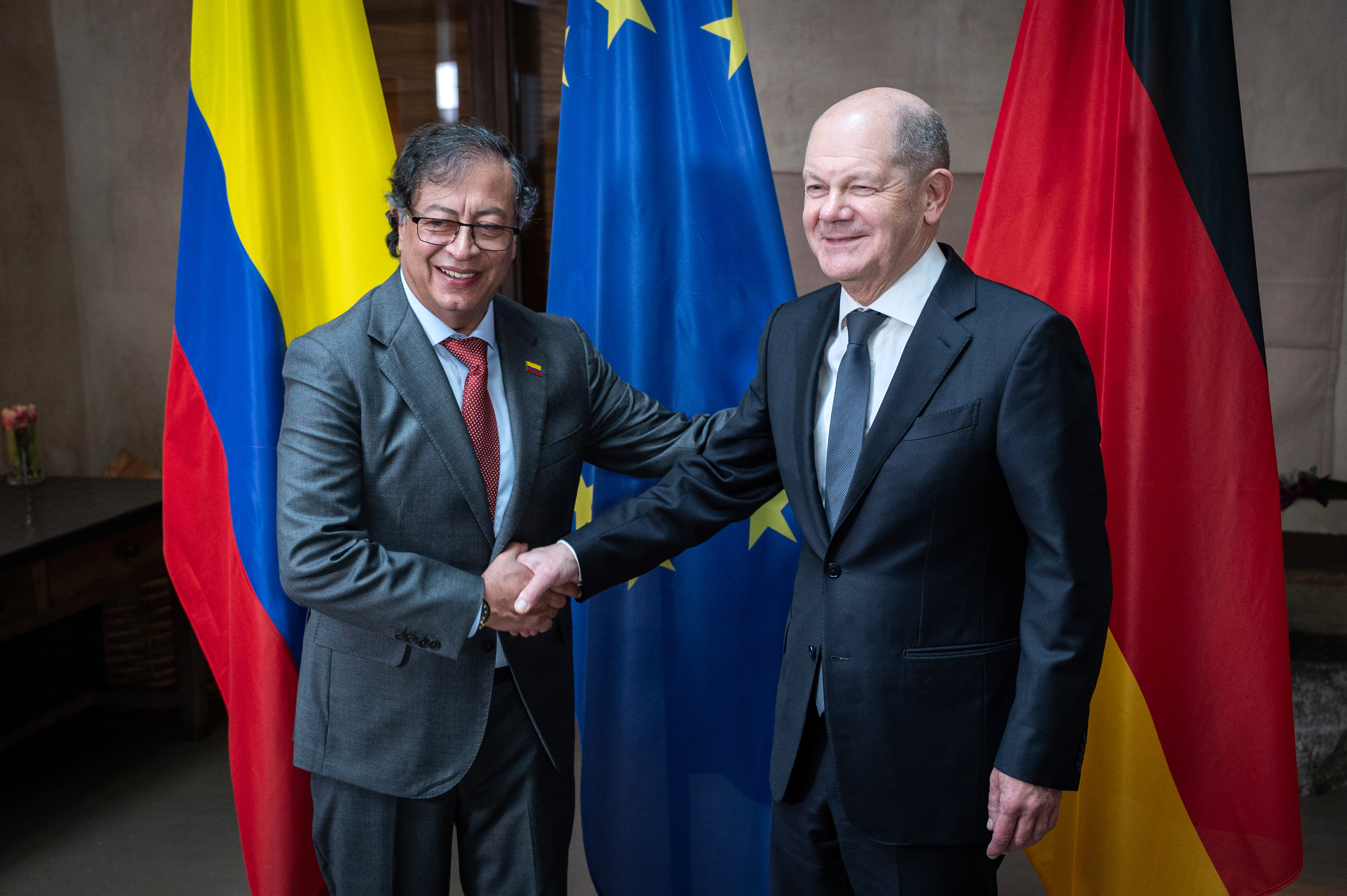
Colombian President Gustavo Petro and German Chancellor Olaf Scholz, 17 February 2024

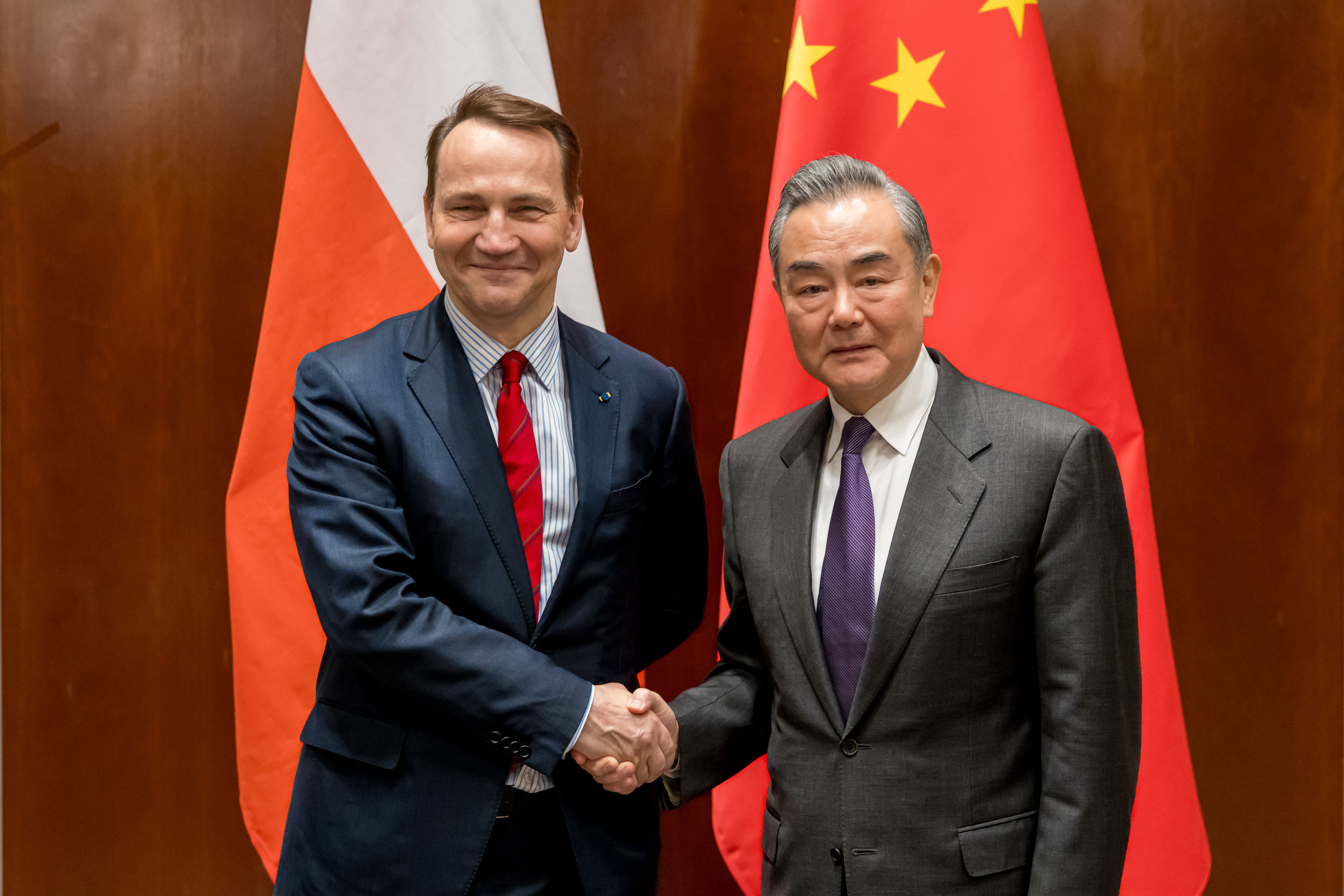
Polish Foreign Minister Radosław Sikorski with Chinese Foreign Minister Wang Yi, 17 February 2024

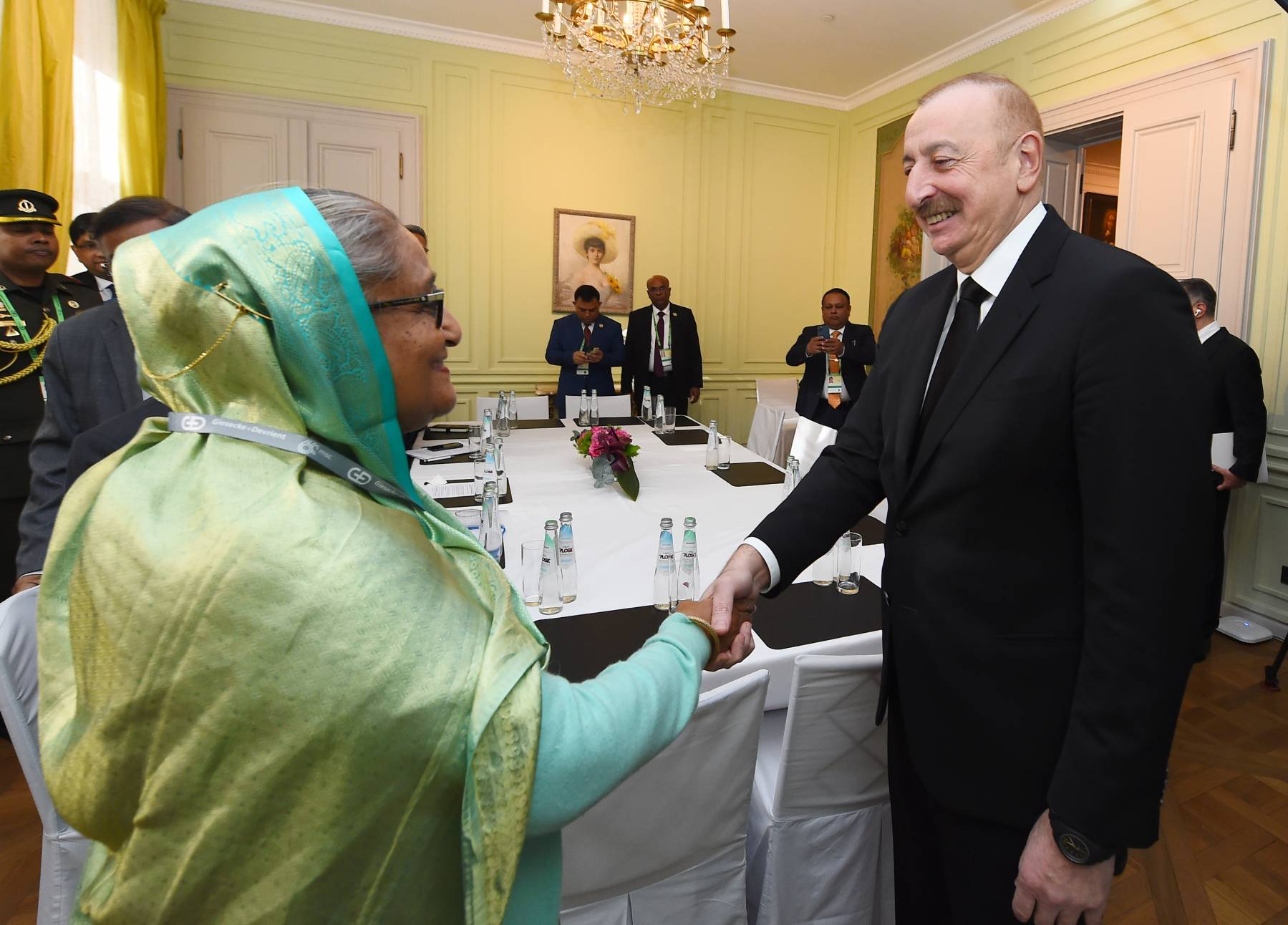
Azerbaijani President Ilham Aliyev with Bangladesh Prime Minister Sheikh Hasina, 17 February 2024

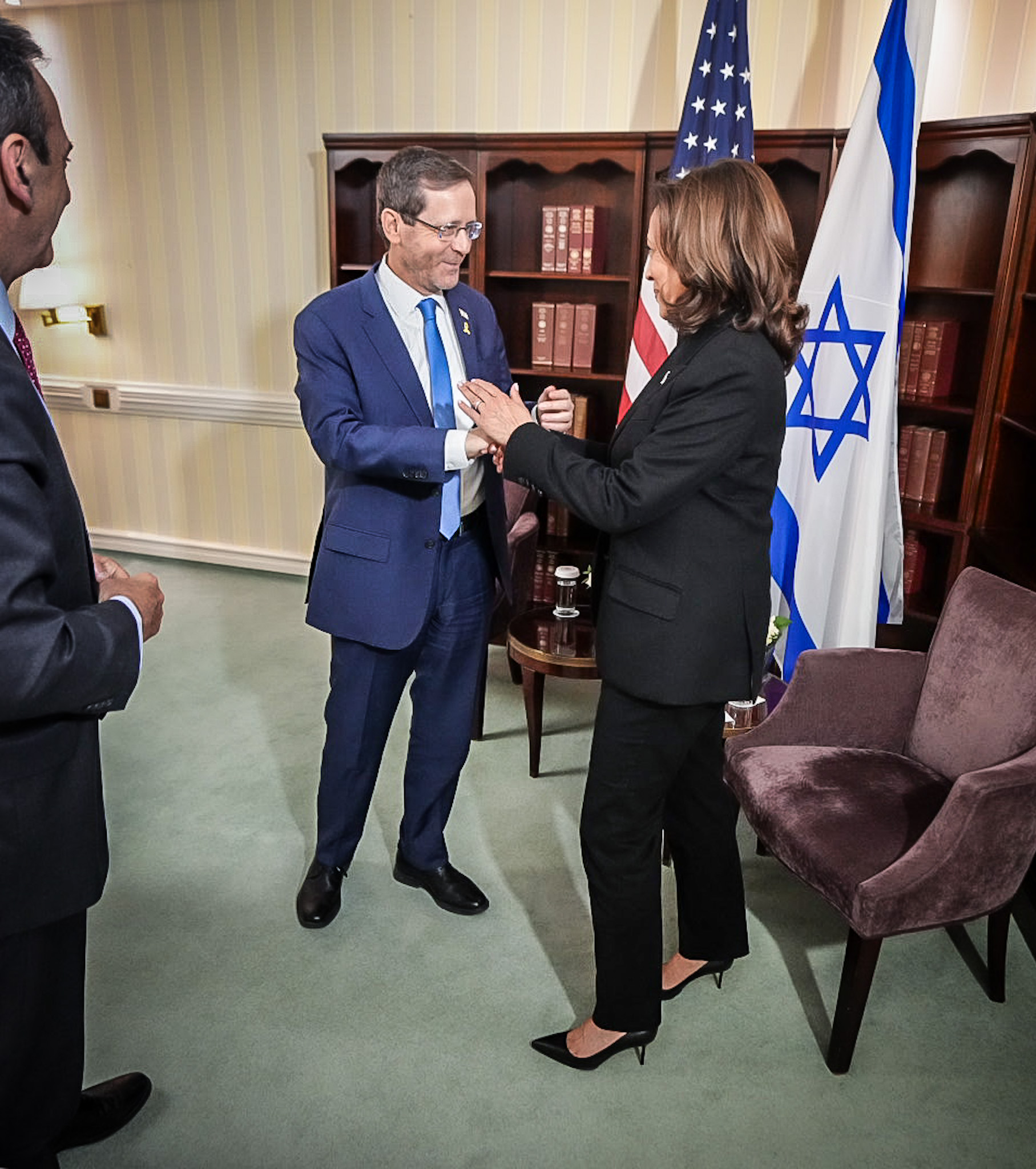
US Vice President Kamala Harris with Israeli President Isaac Herzog at the 60th Munich Security Conference, 16 February 2024

The conference was chaired by German diplomat Christoph Heusgen.

Participants included the following political representatives:

- Olaf Scholz, Chancellor of Germany
- (United Nations) António Guterres, UN Secretary General
- (United States) Antony Blinken, US Secretary of State
- (United States) Kamala Harris, US Vice President
- (United States) John Kerry, US Special Representative
- Volodymyr Zelenskyy, President of Ukraine
- Dmytro Kuleba, Foreign Minister of Ukraine
- (Ukraine) Vitali Klitschko, Mayor of Kyiv
- Isaac Herzog, President of Israel
- Tzipi Livni, former Foreign Minister of Israel
- Mohammad Shtayyeh, Prime Minister of the State of Palestine
- Annalena Baerbock, Foreign Minister of Germany
- Boris Pistorius, Minister of Defence of Germany
- Robert Habeck, Vice Chancellor of Germany
- (European Union) Ursula von der Leyen, President of the European Commission
- Jens Stoltenberg, NATO Secretary General
- José Manuel Albares Bueno, Foreign Minister of Spain
- Zin Mar Aung, Foreign Minister of the National Unity Government of Myanmar
- Nechirvan Barzani, President of Kurdistan Region, Iraq
- Ian Borg, Foreign Minister of Malta
- (United Kingdom) David Cameron, UK Foreign Secretary
- Helena Carreiras, Minister of Defence of Portugal
- Faisal bin Farhan Al Saud, Foreign Minister of Saudi Arabia
- Javier González-Olaechea, Foreign Minister of Peru
- Ng Eng Hen, Minister of Defence of Singapore
- Subrahmanyam Jaishankar, Foreign Minister of India
- Mélanie Joly, Foreign Minister of Canada
- Hadja Lahbib, Foreign Minister of Belgium
- Krišjānis Kariņš, Foreign Minister of Latvia
- Gabrielius Landsbergis, Foreign Minister of Lithuania
- Diana Mondino, Foreign Minister of Argentina
- Mohamed Uvais Mohamed Ali Sabry, Foreign Minister of Sri Lanka
- Mohammed Shia' Al Sudani, Prime Minister of Iraq
- Sameh Shoukry, Foreign Minister of Egypt
- Hanena Ould Sidi, Minister of Defence of Mauritania
- Radosław Sikorski, Foreign Minister of Poland
- Antonio Tajani, Foreign Minister of Italy
- Bafel Talabani, leader of the Patriotic Union of Kurdistan (PUK)
- Stergomena Tax, Minister of Defence of Tanzania
- Elina Valtonen, Foreign Minister of Finland
- Wang Yi, Chinese Communist Party Politburo foreign chief and Foreign Minister of China
- Moosa Zameer, Foreign Minister of the Maldives
- Mohammed bin Abdulrahman Al Thani, Prime Minister of Qatar
- Nana Akufo-Addo, President of Ghana
- Ilham Aliyev, President of Azerbaijan
- Bernardo Arévalo, President of Guatemala
- Alexander De Croo, Prime Minister of Belgium
- Nikolai Denkov, Prime Minister of Bulgaria
- Mariya Gabriel, Deputy Prime Minister of Bulgaria
- Gitanas Nausėda, President of Lithuania
- Mette Frederiksen, Prime Minister of Denmark
- Robert Golob, Prime Minister of Slovenia
- Sheikh Hasina, Prime Minister of Bangladesh
- Masud Bin Momen, Foreign Secretary of Bangladesh
- Kaja Kallas, Prime Minister of Estonia
- Kyriakos Mitsotakis, Prime Minister of Greece
- Mia Mottley, Prime Minister of Barbados
- Kerrie Symmonds, Foreign Minister of Barbados
- Stevo Pendarovski, President of North Macedonia
- Mark Rutte, Prime Minister of the Netherlands
- Edgars Rinkēvičs, President of Latvia
- Evika Siliņa, Prime Minister of Latvia
- Jonas Gahr Støre, Prime Minister of Norway
- Nikol Pashinyan, Prime Minister of Armenia
- Andrej Plenković, Prime Minister of Croatia
- Edi Rama, Prime Minister of Albania
- Kersti Kaljulaid, former President of Estonia
- Alexander Stubb, President-elect of Finland
- Gustavo Petro Urrego, President of Colombia
- (Republic of Ireland) Leo Varadkar, Taoiseach of Ireland
- (Republic of Ireland) Micheál Martin, Foreign Minister of Ireland
- (Georgia (country)) Salome Zourabichvili, President of Georgia
- (Russia) Yulia Navalnaya, Russian opposition leader and widow of Alexei Navalny
