= Komödie im Bayerischen Hof =

Coordinates: 48°08′26″N 11°34′23″E

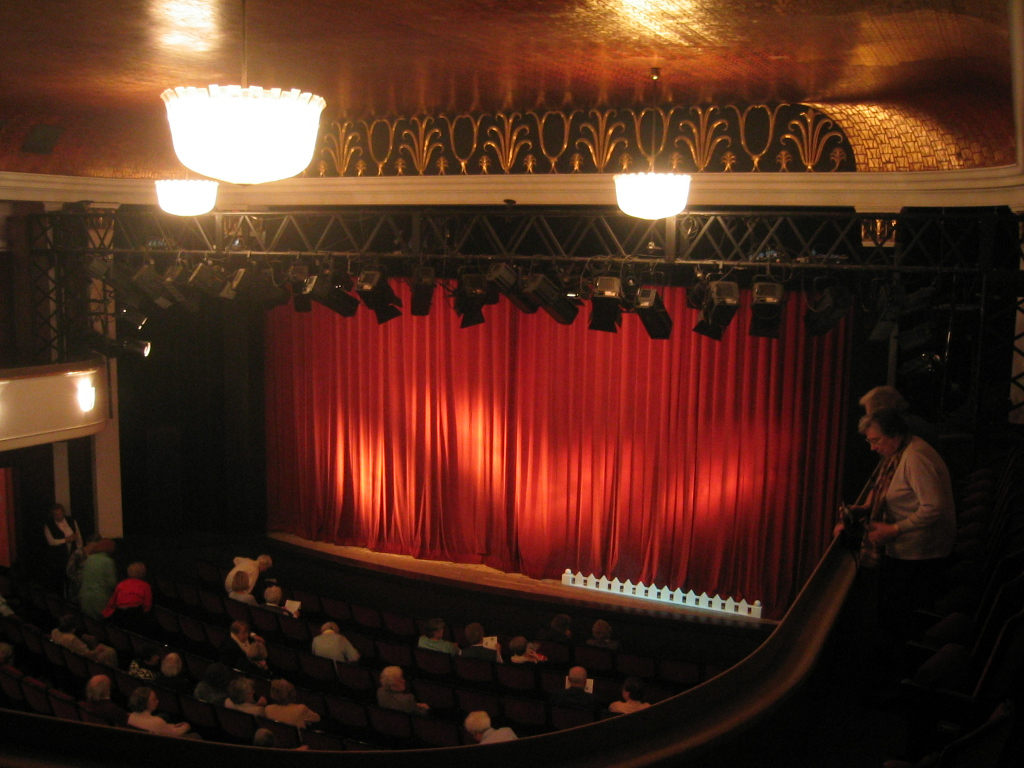
Komödie im Bayerischen Hof

The Komödie im Bayerischen Hof is a large private theater in the Hotel Bayerischer Hof, Munich, Bavaria, Germany. Comedies, musical comedies, musicals and revues are performed in the 570-seat theater.

== History ==
The cultural events in the hotel began in 1886, but due to the destruction of Munich in 1944 abruptly ended. After the reconstruction, the grandmother of the present owner of the hotel who was a celebrated singer set up a concert hall. Her son Falk Volkhardt commissioned architect Erwin Schleich with the design of today's theater which was opened in 1961 under the direction of Gerhard Metzner with the comedy "Das Glas Wasser" by Eugène Scribe. The hotel is run by the family from Innegrit Volkhardt and the artistic aspects by Margit Boenisch since the 1992-93 season.

The elegantly renovated theater has housed performances from stars such as Hans-Jürgen Bäumler, Arno Bergler, Pascal Breuer, Joachim Fuchsberger, Uschi Glas, Michael Hinz, Marion Kracht, Anita Kupsch, Heiner Lauterbach, Michaela May, Horst Naumann, Dietrich Siegl, Susanne Uhlen, Barbara Wussow, Albert Fortell, Alexander Wussow, Wolfgang Spier, Christiane Hörbiger and Heidelinde Weis along with many others. Not only musicals are performed there, boulevard theater and children's pieces (e.g. at Christmas) are also a common attraction. The hall also serves as a venue for corporate parties, meetings and anniversaries.
