= Münchner Klaviersommer =

Series of jazz concerts in Munich

Münchner Klaviersommer (Munich Piano Summer) was a series of jazz concerts in Munich featuring various famous artists. Despite the name, not only pianists performed in these concerts. The concerts were usually held in July in the Philharmonic Hall Gasteig and they took place from 1981 to 1998. The sequel to the Munich Piano Summer is the Jazz Summer in the Bayerischer Hof at the Hotel Bayerischer Hof.

== Artists ==
The concert series began in 1981 with performances by Friedrich Gulda in the America House in Munich, from which the idea of the Munich Piano Summer was based on. The initiator, Gulda, appeared often in the concert series, usually with jazz classics and original compositions mixed and performed with other jazz stars. In 1982 Gulda performed together with Chick Corea, which was followed by performances from Corea and McCoy Tyner in 1983, Cecil Taylor in 1984, James Blood Ulmer in 1985, and Joe Zawinul with Gulda in 1986. A big highlight was the concert from Miles Davis in Gasteig in 1987 with an octet. Miles Davis appeared the year after with a nonet, in 1987 also Herbie Hancock also performed. 1989 included performances from the Modern Jazz Quartet, Herbie Hancock and Bill Evans, Friedrich Gulda, Joe Zawinul, the Jacques Loussier Trio, Katia Labèque, John McLaughlin, George Benson accompanied by McCoy Tyner and Michael Brecker. In 1986 Keith Jarrett performed.

Other Performances included:

- 1990: Stan Getz (his last concert) and Herbie Mann
- 1991: Eliane Elias, Gonzalo Rubalcaba, Herbie Hancock Quartet (with Wayne Shorter, Stanley Clarke) and the Michel Camilo Quintet,
- 1992: George Shearing and Bob Berg / Chick Corea / Eddie Gomez / Steve Gadd
- 1993: Lionel Hampton with Allstar Band (Clark Terry, Sweets Edison, Al Grey, Benny Golson, Junior Mance, Jimmy Woode, Panama Francis, Ingrid Jensen), the Ahmad Jamal Trio, Joe Henderson Trio (with Dave Holland, Al Foster) Al Di Meola, Burkard Schliessmann
- 1994: Gonzalo Rubalcaba, Oscar Peterson Quartet, an all-star band led by Lalo Schifrin (with James Morrison, Ray Brown, Grady Tate), the Joe Henderson Quartet and Joshua Redman Quartet (with Brad Mehldau, Christian McBride)
- 1995: Gary Burton, Milt Jackson, Wynton Marsalis and the Jazz at Lincoln Center Orchestra
- 1996: Wallace Roney, Joshua Redman, Chick Corea, Christian McBride, Roy Haynes
- 1997: Chick Corea / Gary Burton, Herb Alpert and Band, Michel Petrucciani with Miroslav Vitous and Steve Gadd
- 1998: Albert Mangelsdorff / Wolfgang Dauner Quintet (with Dieter Ilg, Christof Lauer, Wolfgang Haffner), Jasper van't Hof with Dave Friedman, Michel Petrucciani Trio, Oscar Peterson Quartet, Gonzalo Rubalcaba

== Jazz Summer of Hotel Bayerischer Hof ==
The end came when the city of Munich discontinued the concert series in 1999. It was initially continued under the same name and later (in 2007) as Jazz Summer of Hotel Bayerischer Hof in which the piano concertos of the summer already took place in addition to Gasteig since 1991. The Jazz Summer is held annually in July at the Night Club (late concerts) and in the hotel's ballroom.

The events are accompanied by exhibitions and films and since 2008 regular appearances from a band made up of Munich jazz critics, led by Wolfgang Schmid. Giving the musicians are the opportunity to write a critic about the critics, which is then published in the Jazz newspaper.
