= NATO headquarters =

Headquarters of the North Atlantic Treaty Organization in Haren, Brussels, Belgium

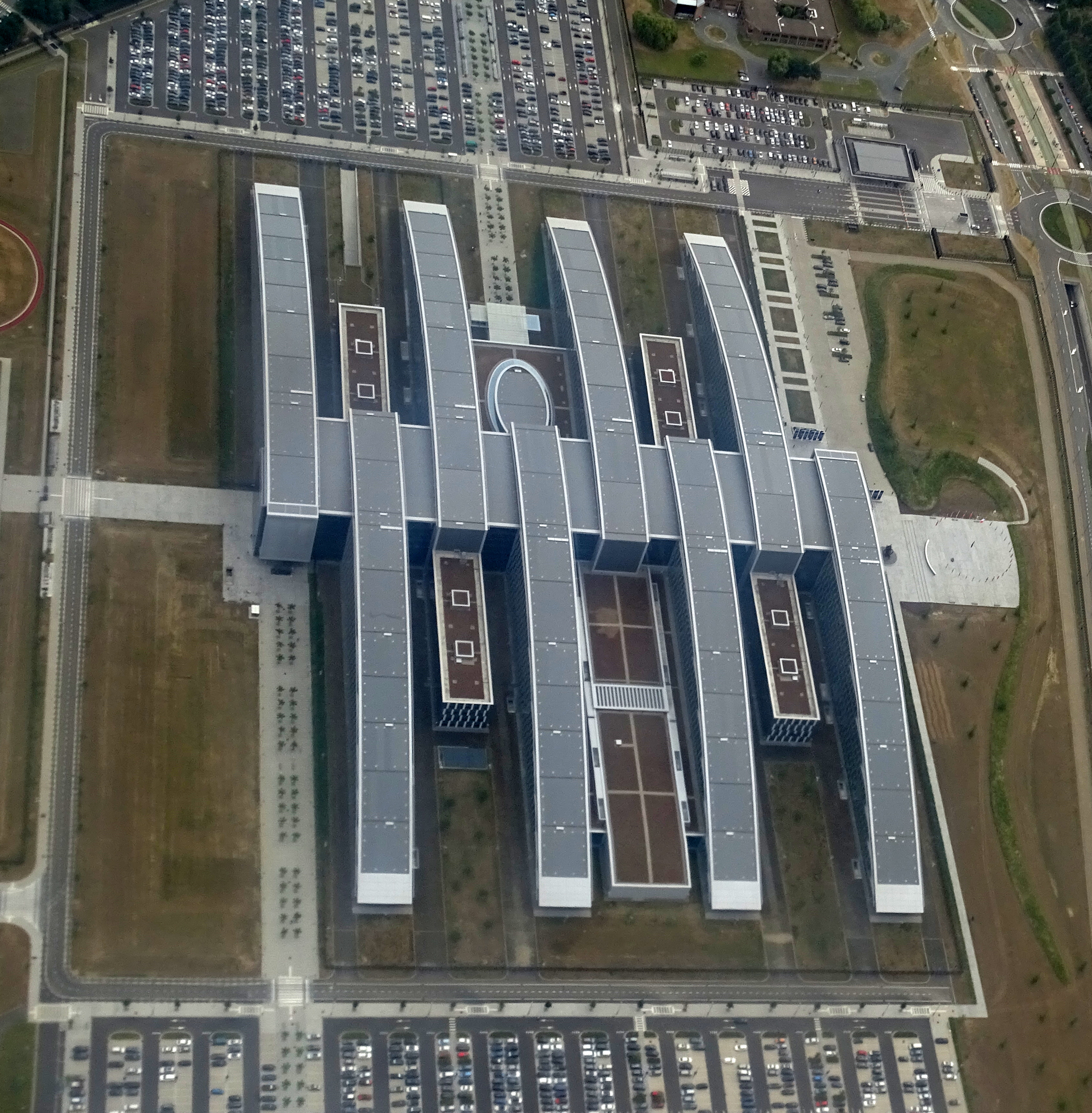
- Aerial view of NATO headquarters in Haren, Brussels
- Interactive map of the NATO headquarters area

General information
- Type: Office, conference building
- Location: Boulevard Léopold III / Leopold III-laan, 1110 Haren, City of Brussels, Brussels-Capital Region, Belgium
- Coordinates: 50°52′45″N 4°25′30″E
- Construction started: 2010
- Completed: 2016
- Inaugurated: 25 May 2017
- Owner: North Atlantic Treaty Organization (NATO)

The NATO headquarters is the political and administrative center of the North Atlantic Treaty Organization (NATO). After previous locations in London and Paris, it has been headquartered in Brussels since 1967, in a complex in Haren, part of the City of Brussels, along the Boulevard Léopold III/Leopold III-laan.

The staff at the headquarters is composed of national delegations of NATO member states and includes civilian and military liaison offices and officers or diplomatic missions and diplomats of partner countries, as well as the International Staff (IS) and International Military Staff (IMS) filled from serving members of the armed forces of member states. Non-governmental citizens' groups have also grown up in support of NATO, broadly under the banner of the Atlantic Council/Atlantic Treaty Association movement.

== History ==
=== 1949–1952: London ===
When NATO was established in 1949, London was the first location chosen for its headquarters. A 19th-century mansion designed by the architect Thomas Cubitt at 13 Belgrave Square, in the heart of the city's Belgravia neighborhood, was made available to the organization. Nowadays, this building houses the Ghana High Commission.

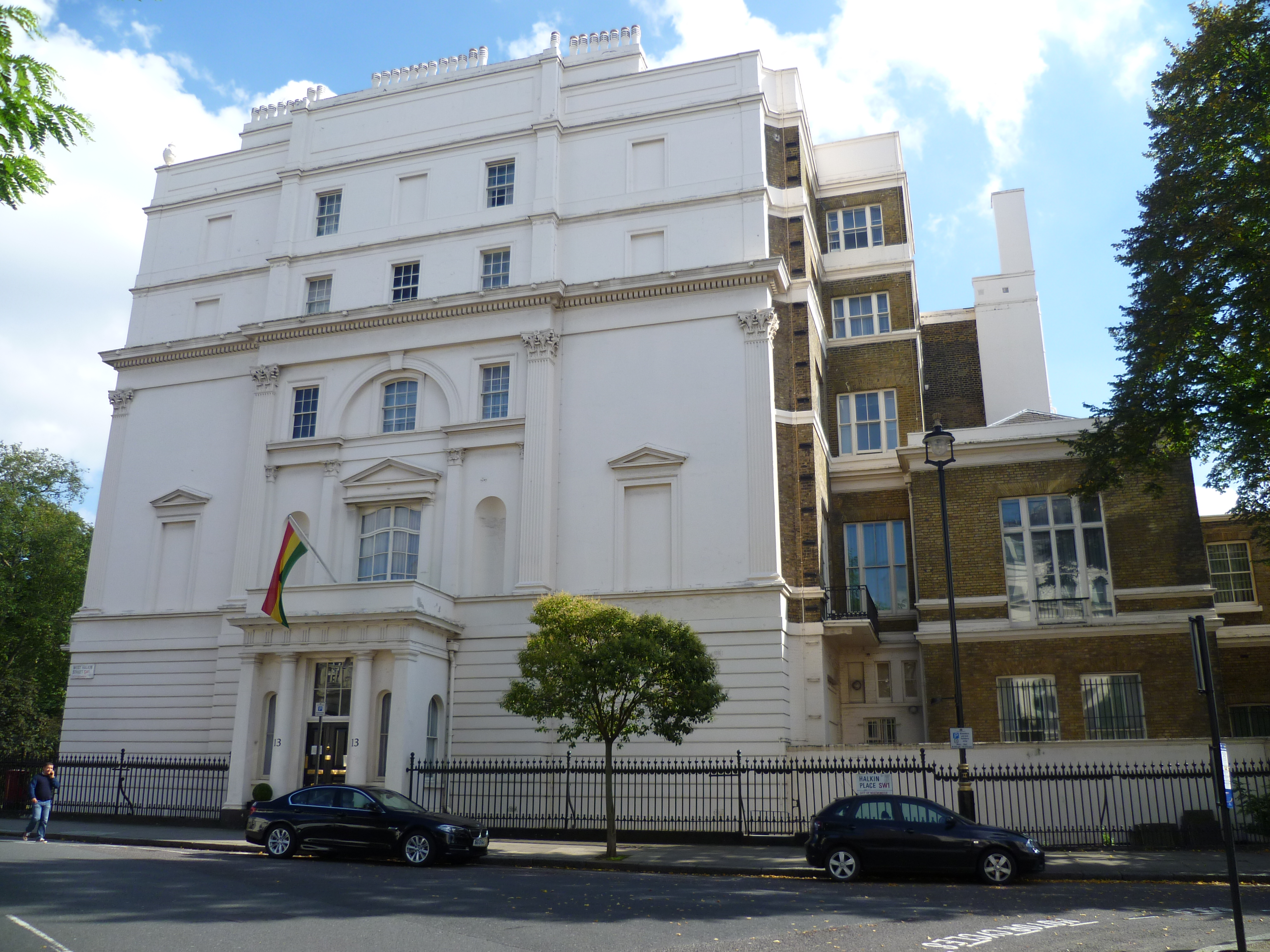
13 Belgrave Square, London, NATO headquarters from 1949 to 1952

=== 1952–1967: Paris ===
==== 1952–1959: Temporary premises ====
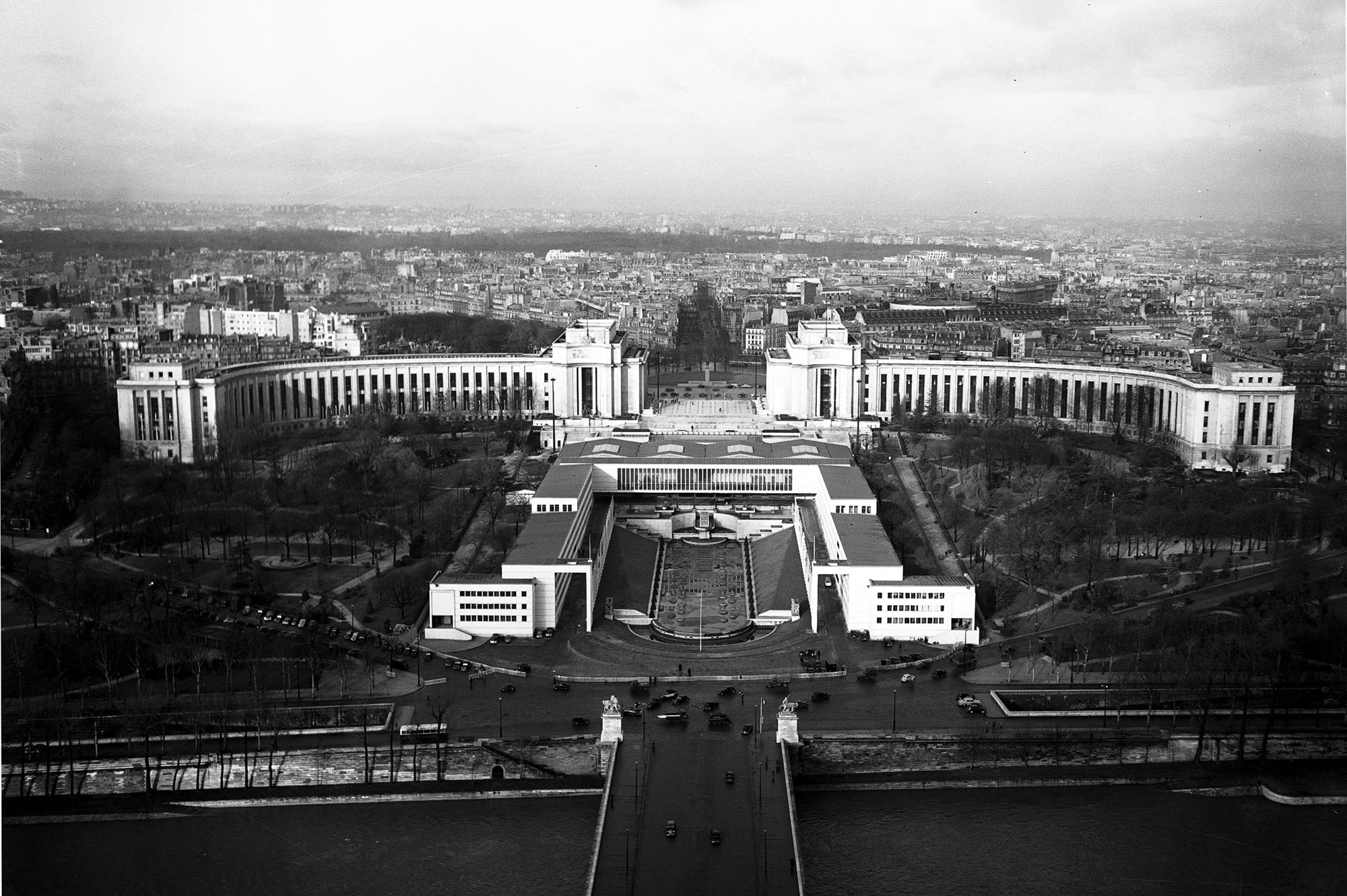
Temporary NATO annex, in use from 1952 to 1959, constructed along the reflecting pool of the Palais de Chaillot in the Trocadéro, Paris

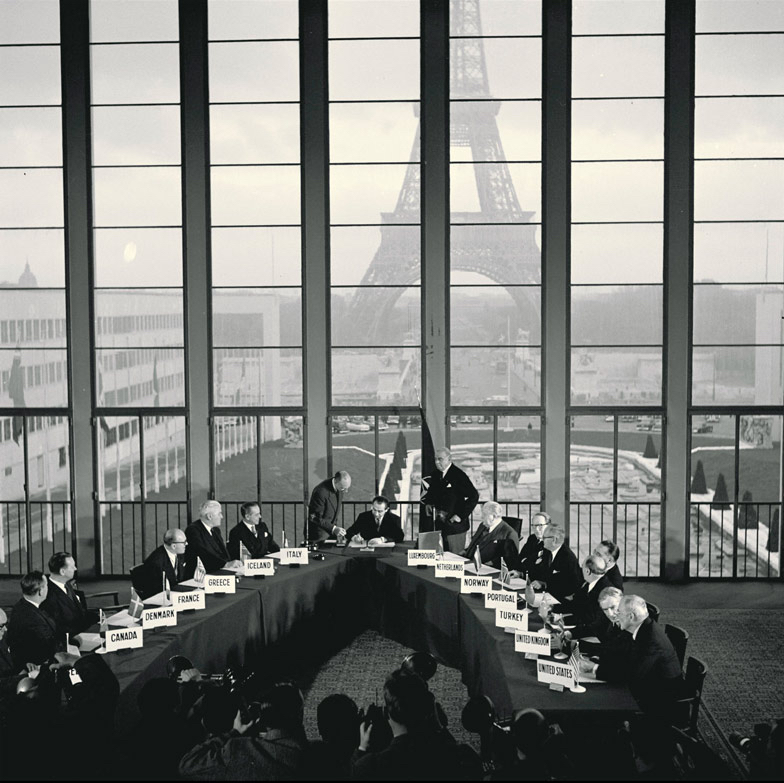
Signing of NATO membership invitation to West Germany at the Palais de Chaillot, 1954

On 15 September 1950, at a meeting of the North Atlantic Council in New York City, it was decided to establish the headquarters in Paris, mainly because of the city's central position and its excellent means of communication. The move was officialized on 1 April 1952, coinciding with NATO's third anniversary. In Paris, the organization initially occupied temporary premises constructed along the reflecting pool of the Palais de Chaillot in the Trocadéro, located across the Seine from the Eiffel Tower, in the 16th arrondissement.

==== 1959–1967: Permanent premises ====
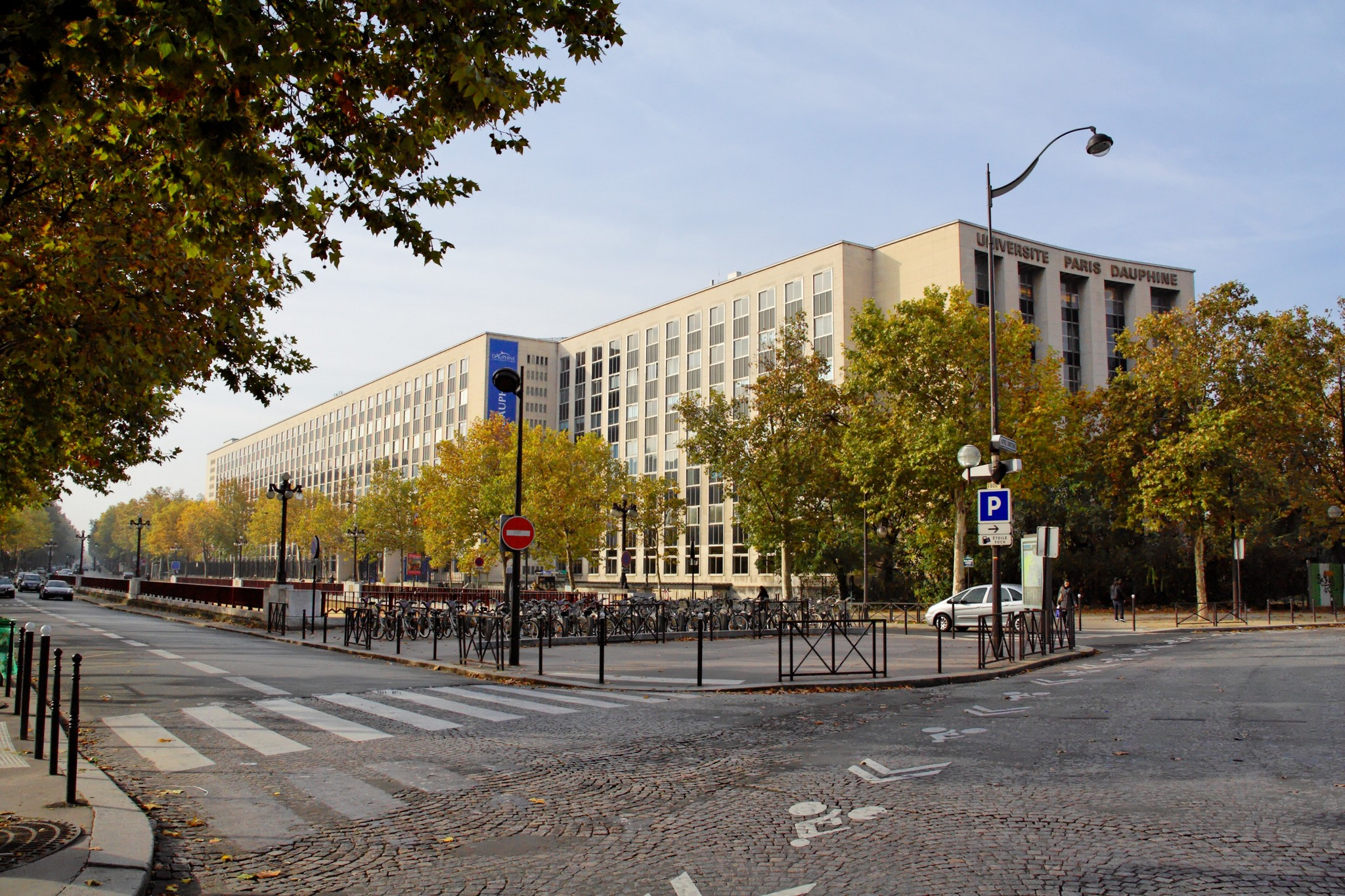
Palais de l'OTAN ("NATO Palace") in Porte Dauphine, Paris, NATO headquarters from 1959 to 1967 (Note: The building now serves as the main campus of Paris Dauphine University.)

A permanent building, donated by France in April 1954, was constructed at Porte Dauphine in the 16th arrondissement, just off the Boulevard Périphérique and in the immediate vicinity of the Bois de Boulogne. The Palais Dauphine, also known as the Palais de l'OTAN ("NATO Palace"), was built between 1955 and 1957, according to the plans of the architect Jacques Carlu, who had also previously designed the Palais de Chaillot. The building was A-shaped, denoting 'alliance' or 'allies'. The organization moved there in 1959, only to leave it a few years later. The building now serves as the main campus of Paris Dauphine University.

=== 1967–present: Brussels ===
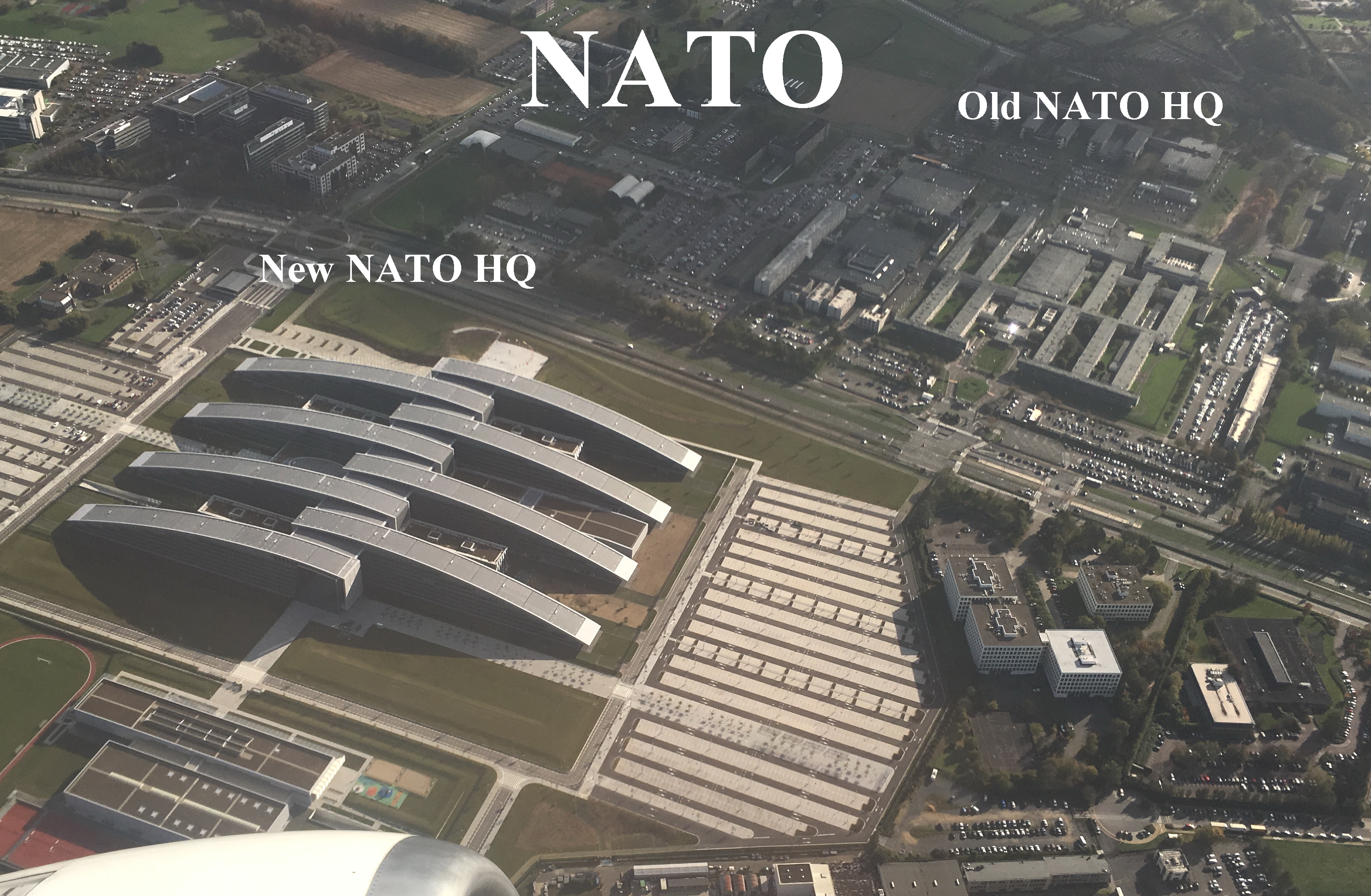
NATO headquarters (since 2017) in Brussels. The old headquarters (from 1967 to 2017) are across the road.

==== 1967–2017: Temporary premises ====
Following France's decision to withdraw from NATO's Military Command Structure in 1966, the organization moved its headquarters again. In December of that year, the organization took the decision to set up its new headquarters in Brussels. Originally planned on the Heysel/Heizel Plateau in Laeken, they were "temporarily" built on the Boulevard Léopold III/Leopold III-laan in the former municipality of Haren (merged like Laeken with the City of Brussels), in the north-eastern part of Brussels.

After an international call for tenders, NATO entrusted the construction of these new headquarters, in March 1967, to two Belgian-German-Dutch joint ventures. Work began immediately and was completed twenty-nine weeks later. The site, owned by the Belgian Government and symbolically rented to NATO, was inaugurated on 16 October 1967.

==== 2017–present: Permanent premises ====
Problems in the original building stemmed from its hurried construction in 1967. In 1999, during the Washington Summit, the Heads of State and Government of the allied countries decided to replace the building with headquarters adapted to 21st-century needs. It was then decided to build new headquarters located just opposite the current ones on the site of the old terminals of Haren Airport.

A new €750 million headquarters building was constructed over the period between 2010 and summer 2016, and was dedicated on 25 May 2017 with a ceremony in the presence of allied Heads of State. Secretary-General Jens Stoltenberg addressed the crowd, while then-US President Donald Trump hectored some among the crowd over their failure to live up to the 2% GDP target required by NATO spending rules. The cost of the new headquarters building escalated to about €1.1 billion.

The complex was designed by an international design consortium led by the US Firm of Skidmore, Owings and Merrill, including Jo Palma. Both Design and Construction were completed under the auspices of the Belgian Ministry of Defense's Project Management Team led by Colonel Christian LaNotte, Belgian Army Engineers. Project Financing and Requirements definition as well as the Design and Construction Phases were overseen for NATO by its HQ Project Office, led by Donald Hutchins (CAPT, US Navy Civil Engineer Corps, Retired) during the design Phase and Brigadier General Anthony Carruth, (British Army Engineer, Retired) during construction. According to the designers, the appearance of the new headquarters symbolize "several interlocking fingers" as "a three-dimensional representation for a complex decision-making body".

== Overview ==
Situated along the Boulevard Léopold III in Haren, part of the City of Brussels, the headquarters include 250,000 m^{2} (2,700,000 sq ft) of floor space, and is office and home to an international staff of 3,800. The Boulevard Léopold III is a major dual carriageway linking via the A201 motorway the center of Brussels to its airport, the latter being located just over 1 km (0.62 mi) from the NATO site. Access can be done by taking the STIB/MIVB bus lines 12, 21, 65 and the tram line 62, as well as the De Lijn network. The site is also approximately 80 km (50 mi) north of NATO's military headquarters in Casteau, near Mons, still called Supreme Headquarters Allied Powers Europe (SHAPE), although it now houses Allied Command Operations, which directs NATO's military operations worldwide.

The staff at the Brussels headquarters primarily supports the North Atlantic Council and its subsidiary organisms. The International Staff provides advice, guidance, and administrative support to the NATO Secretary General. It works closely with the International Military Staff (IMS). The first is primarily civilian; the second, primarily military, filled from serving members of the armed forces of member states. The IMS works to the instructions of the senior military body of the Alliance, the Military Committee, and its Chairman. There are also a host of national delegations; liaison offices, and diplomatic missions attached to the headquarters.

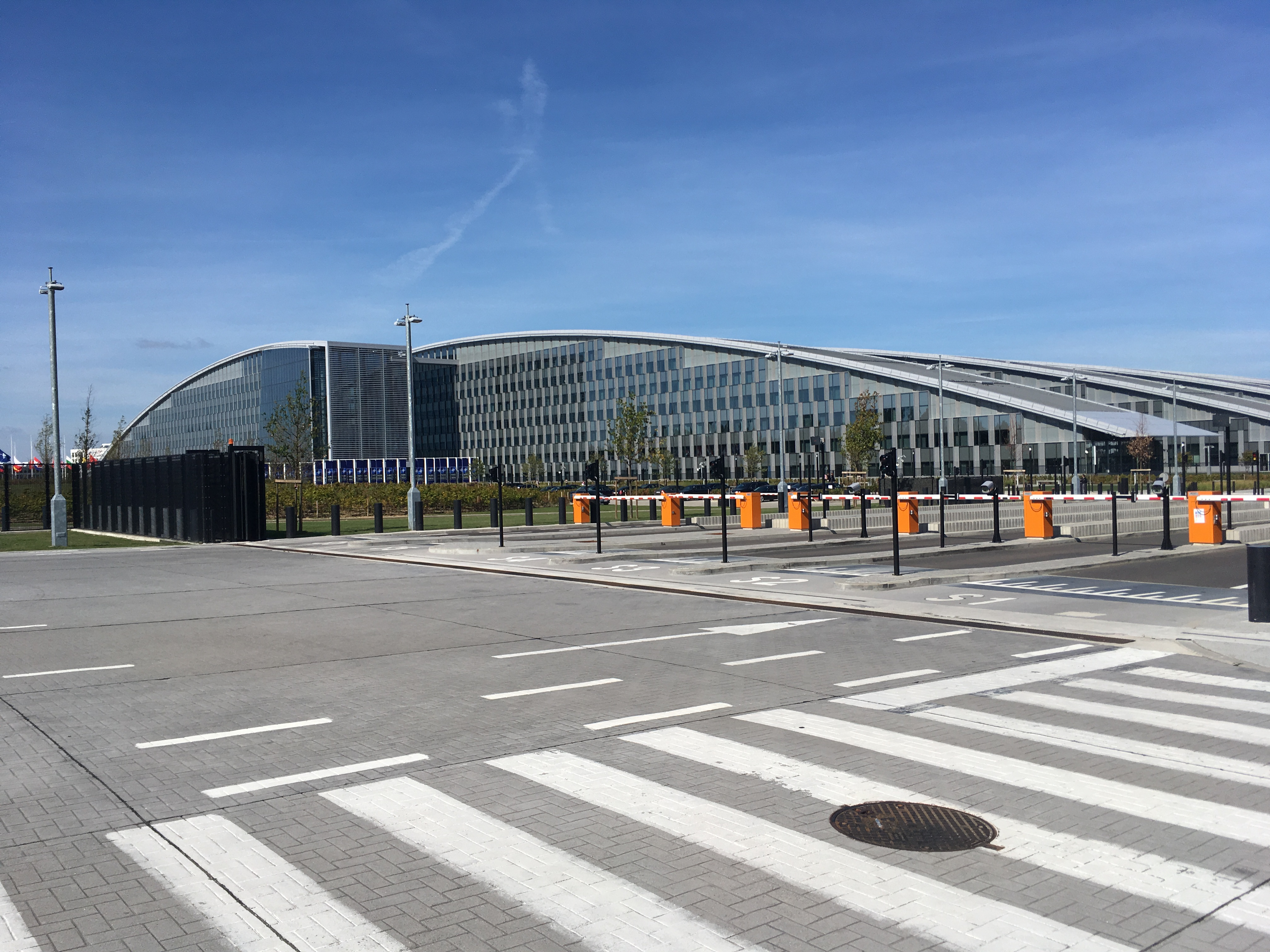
Exterior view from the Boulevard Léopold III/Leopold III-laan

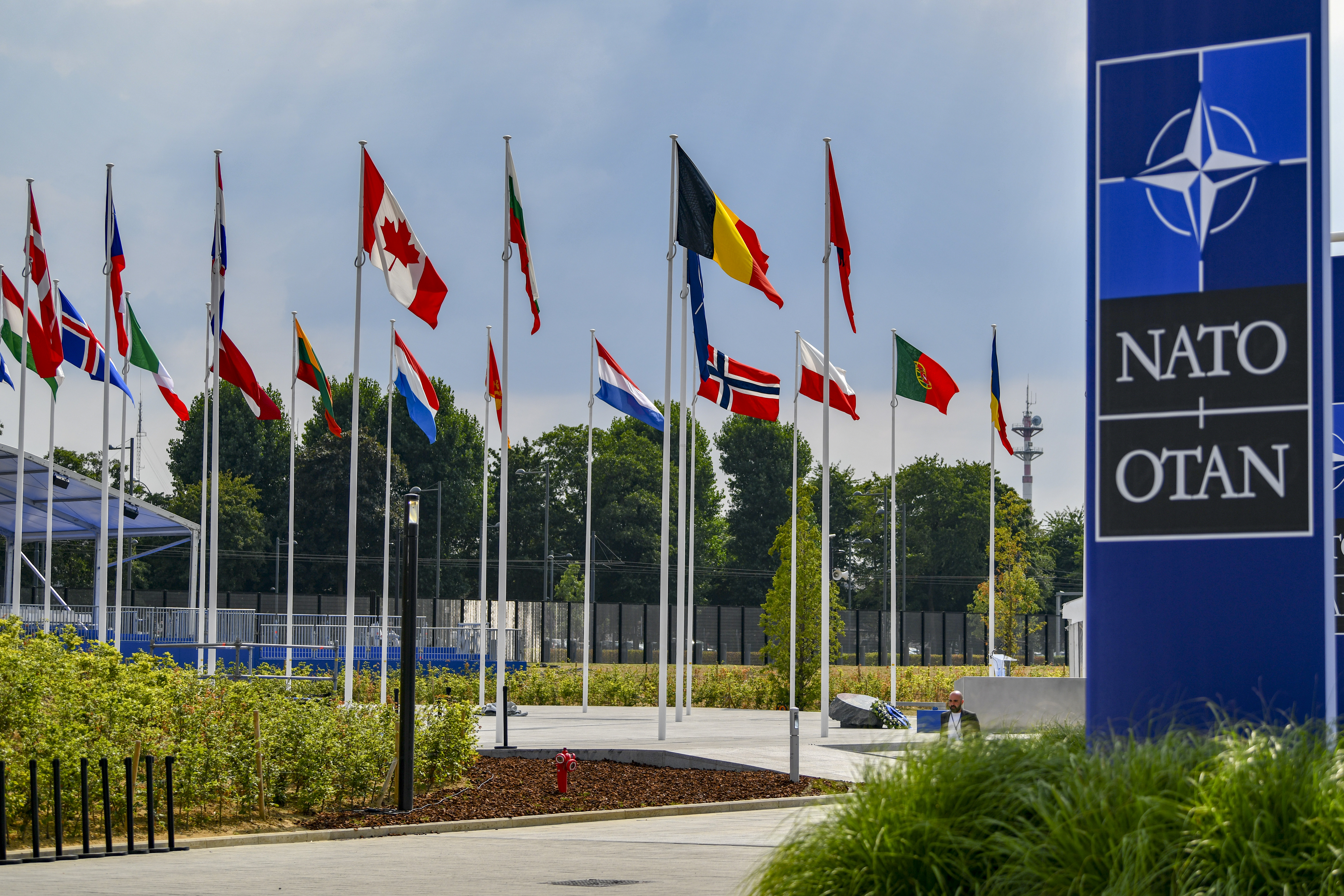
Flags of member states waving at the entrance

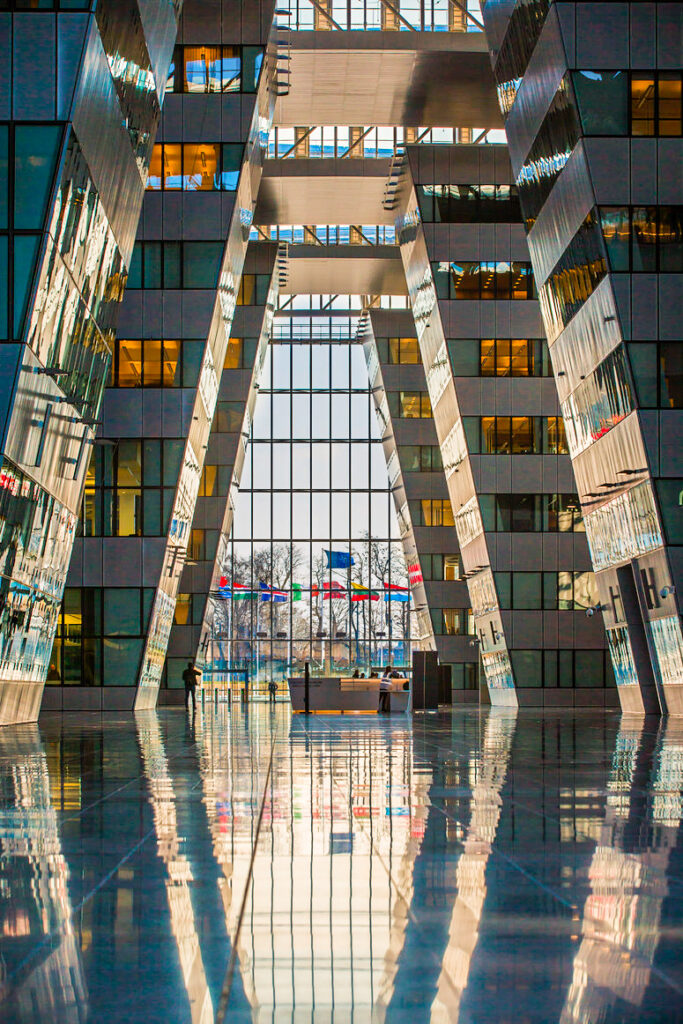
Interior view

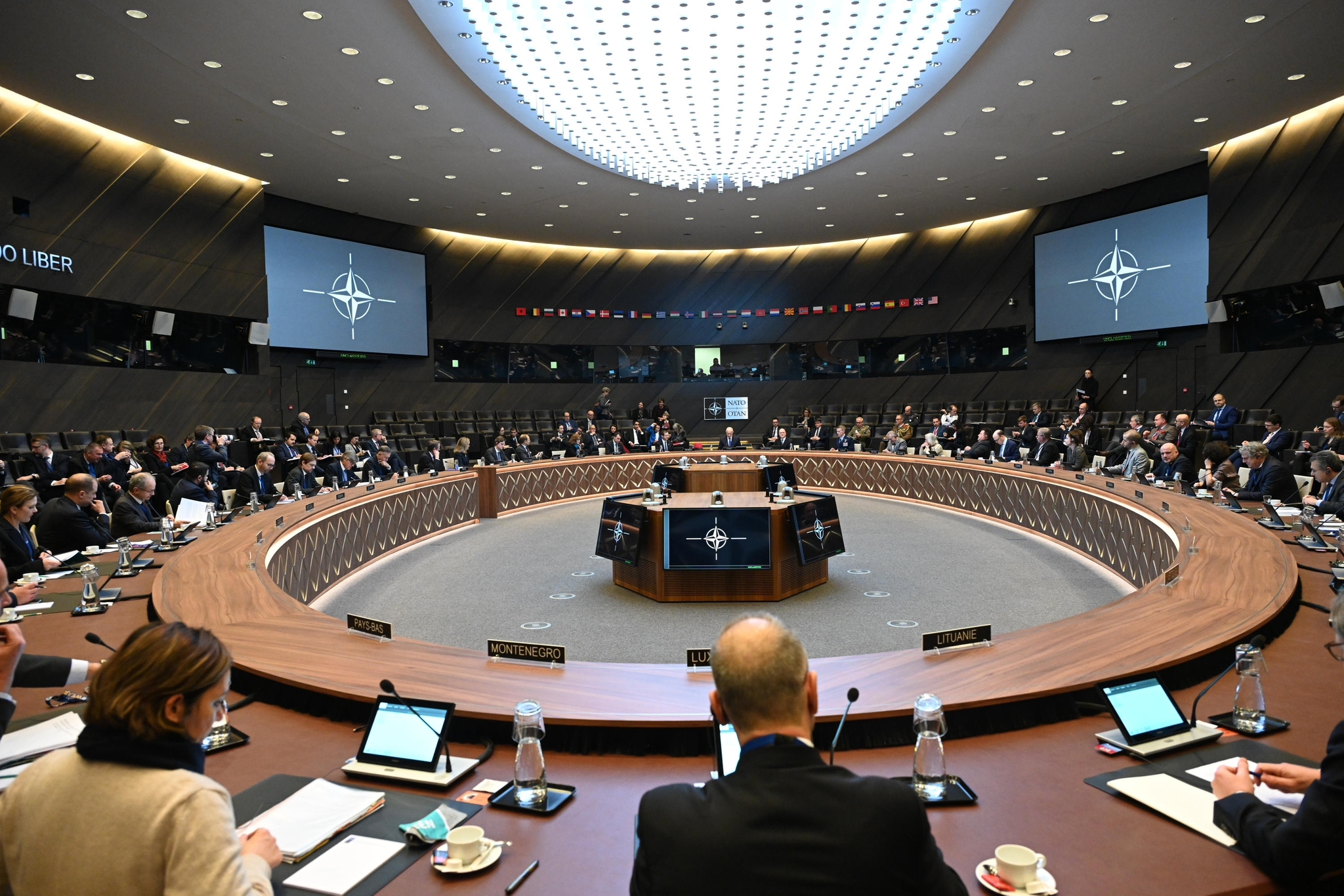
Meeting room

== See also ==
- NATO Star, a sculpture situated in the headquarters' court of honor
- Supreme Headquarters Allied Powers Europe (SHAPE) in Mons, Belgium
- Allied Command Transformation (ACT) in Norfolk, United States
