= Jo Palma =

Portuguese-Canadian architect

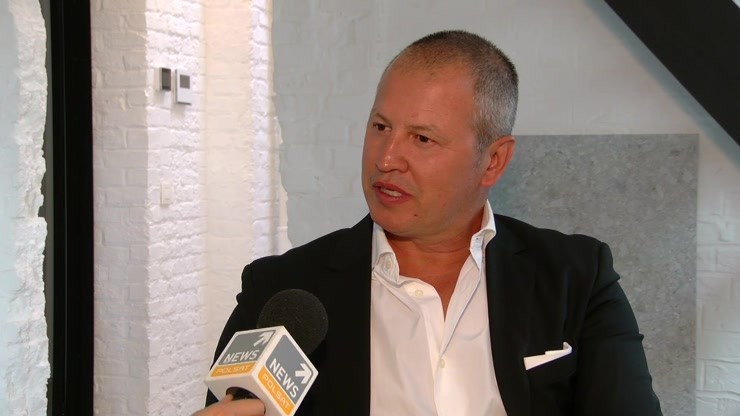
- Palma in 2018
- Born: Portugal
- Education: Victoria College; University of Toronto
- Occupation: Architect

Jo Palma is a Portuguese-Canadian architect and founder of PALMA. After graduating from Victoria College and the University of Toronto, he worked as a design director.

== Early life ==
Jo Palma was born in Portugal, and served in the Portuguese Navy as Master-at-Arms 1st Class. He graduated with a Bachelor’s degree from Victoria College and a Masters in Architecture from the University of Toronto.

== Career ==
Cayan Tower in Dubai, designed by Palma

Jo Palma worked as Design Director in both Chicago and London for the firm Skidmore, Owings & Merrill. In 2015 Palma joined the architecture firm Perkins+Will, where he served as the Regional Design Director, EMEA, working out of their London office. He later founded the architecture firm Jo Palma + Partners also known as PALMA.

=== Buildings and projects ===
Over his career he has designed and masterplanned buildings on five continents in total. These projects have included mixed-use buildings, skyscrapers, government headquarters, residential complexes (like the Admirala Lazareva in St. Petersburg, Russia), transportation hubs (like the Dublin Airport New Terminal Expansion), civic institutions (like the Panama International Convention Center in Panama City), and community centers (like the Paulínia Smart Community in Paulínia, Brazil). He has also helped to produce master plans for cities including Antalya, Turkey.

Palma was the Chief Architect of the North Atlantic Treaty Organization headquarters in Brussels, which opened in 2017. He also the designed the Baltimore Tower in London, UK, and the Liansheng Financial Center in Taiyuan, China. Palma is the designer of the Cayan Tower in Dubai, which is the tallest twisting tower in the world, in addition to the city's Rolex Tower. In 2018 Palma began designing The Miami Basel building in Miami, a thirty-six story mixed-use development.
