= 58th Munich Security Conference =

58th Munich Security Conference Münchner Sicherheitskonferenz
- Nickname: MSC 2022
- Begins: 18 February 2022
- Ends: 20 February 2022
- Venue: Hotel Bayerischer Hof
- Locations: Munich, Germany
- Previous event: 57th (2021)
- Next event: 59th (2023)

The 58th Munich Security Conference (MSC 2022) was held from 18 to 20 February 2022 at the Hotel Bayerischer Hof in Munich, Germany. Due to the COVID-19 pandemic, the conference was held on a smaller scale than in previous years. It was held under the motto Turning the Tide – Unlearning Helplessness. The event took place amid rising tensions between Russia and Ukraine. A few days later, Russia launched its invasion of Ukraine.

It was the last security conference moderated by Wolfgang Ischinger. At the conclusion of the event, he handed over the chairmanship of the Munich Security Conference to his successor, Ambassador Christoph Heusgen.

== Attendees ==
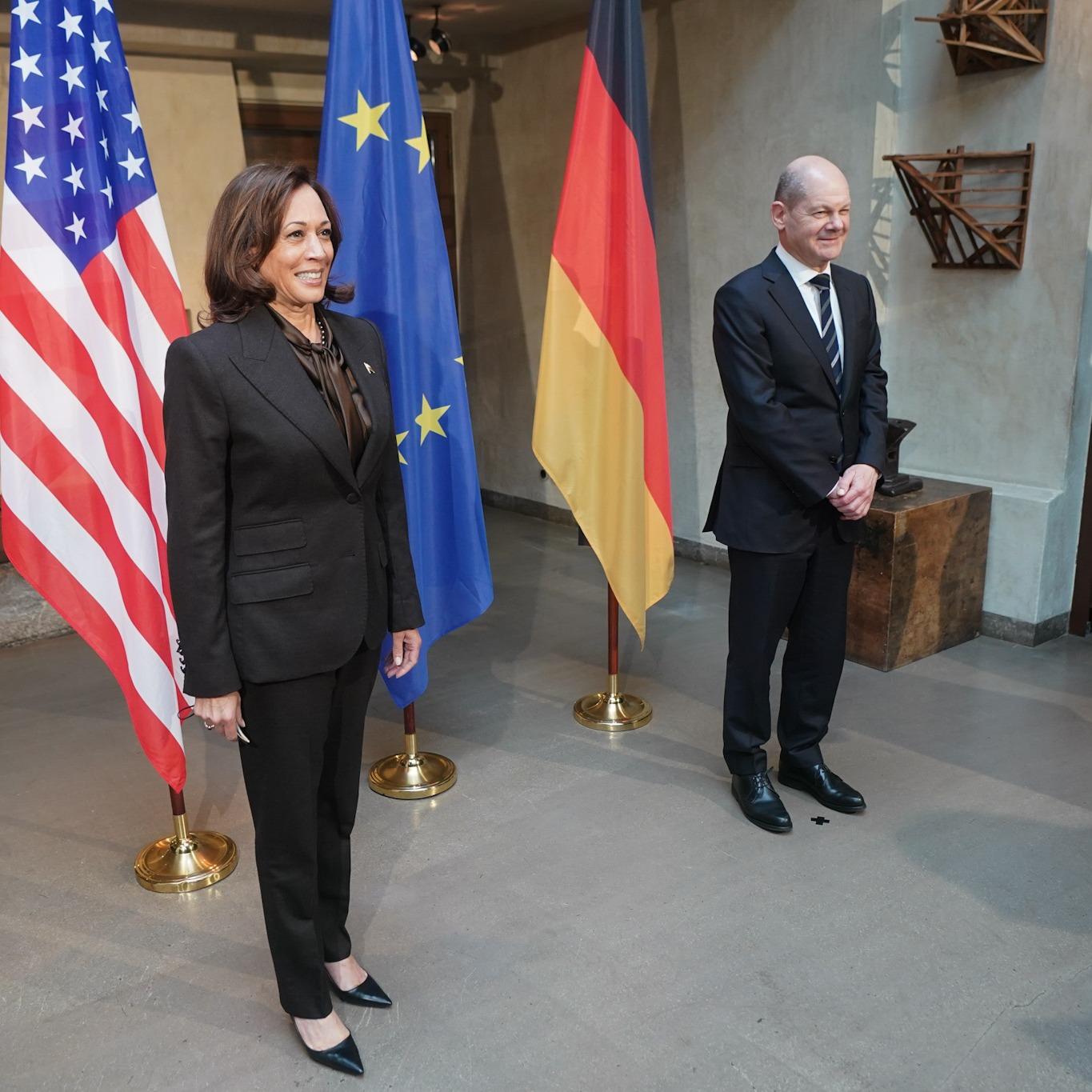
Kamala Harris and Olaf Scholz at the 58th Munich Security Conference

Participants included the following political representatives:

- (Germany) Olaf Scholz, Chancellor
- (Germany) Annalena Baerbock, Foreign Minister
- (France) Jean-Yves Le Drian, Foreign Minister
- (Canada) Mélanie Joly, Foreign Minister
- (European Union) Ursula von der Leyen, President of the European Commission
- (United States) Kamala Harris, Vice President
- (United States) Antony Blinken, Secretary of State
- (United States) Nancy Pelosi, Speaker of the US House of Representatives
- (NATO) Jens Stoltenberg, Secretary General
- (Ukraine) Volodymyr Zelenskyy, President
- (Ukraine) Dmytro Kuleba, Foreign Minister
- (United Nations) António Guterres, Secretary-General
- (World Health Organization) Tedros Adhanom Ghebreyesus, Director-General
- (China) Wang Yi, Foreign Minister
- (India) Subrahmanyam Jaishankar, Foreign Minister
- (Japan) Yoshimasa Hayashi, Foreign Minister
- (South Africa) Naledi Pandor, Foreign Minister
- (United Kingdom) Boris Johnson, Prime Minister
- (Poland) Mateusz Morawiecki, Prime Minister
- (Greece) Kyriakos Mitsotakis, Prime Minister
- (Estonia) Kaja Kallas, Prime Minister
- (Latvia) Egils Levits, President
- (Latvia) Edgars Rinkēvičs, Foreign Minister
- (Lithuania) Gitanas Nausėda, President
- (Finland) Sauli Niinistö, President
- (Bulgaria) Kiril Petkov, Prime Minister
- (Moldova) Maia Sandu, President
- Sviatlana Tsikhanouskaya, Head of the United Transitional Cabinet of Belarus
- (Armenia) Nikol Pashinyan, Prime Minister
- (United States) Bill Gates, American entrepreneur
- (Switzerland) Pälvi Pulli, Head of Security Policy at the Swiss Federal Department of Defence
- (Kosovo) Vjosa Osmani, President
- (Kosovo) Albin Kurti, Prime Minister
- (Montenegro) Milo Đukanović, President
- (North Macedonia) Dimitar Kovačevski, Prime Minister
- (Croatia) Andrej Plenković, Prime Minister
- (Albania) Edi Rama, Prime Minister

For the first time since the end of the Cold War, Russia did not send any high-ranking state representatives to the diplomatic meeting.

== Topics ==
The conference ended four days before the Russian invasion of Ukraine on 24 February 2022. The Russia–Ukraine crisis was the dominant topic of discussion. European and transatlantic leaders discussed possible responses to further Russian military action, including sanctions and diplomatic efforts. Josep Borrell stated that the European Union had been supporting Ukraine financially since Russia's annexation of Crimea in 2014. French Defence Minister Florence Parly said that Europe needed to strengthen its defence capabilities. German officials also signalled increased defence spending while continuing to reject arms deliveries to Kyiv. Charles Michel President of the European Council warned Russia of severe sanctions in the event of an invasion.

For the first time, no Russian government representative attended the conference. Participants called on Russia to refrain from invading Ukraine while also stressing that severe economic sanctions would follow any attack. Antony Blinken the United States Secretary of State reiterated the United States' willingness to continue negotiations with Russia. Chinese Foreign Minister Wang Yi emphasized Ukraine's sovereignty, while also criticizing further eastward expansion of NATO. In his speech Ukrainian President Volodymyr Zelenskyy criticized what he described as the international community's hesitation in responding to the threat posed by Russia, and called for stronger support for Ukraine.

The conference also included discussions on broader issues of human security including global health, food insecurity and the role of gender in security policy.
