= Hotel Bayerischer Hof =

Luxury hotel in Munich, Germany

Coordinates: 48°08′25″N 11°34′23″E

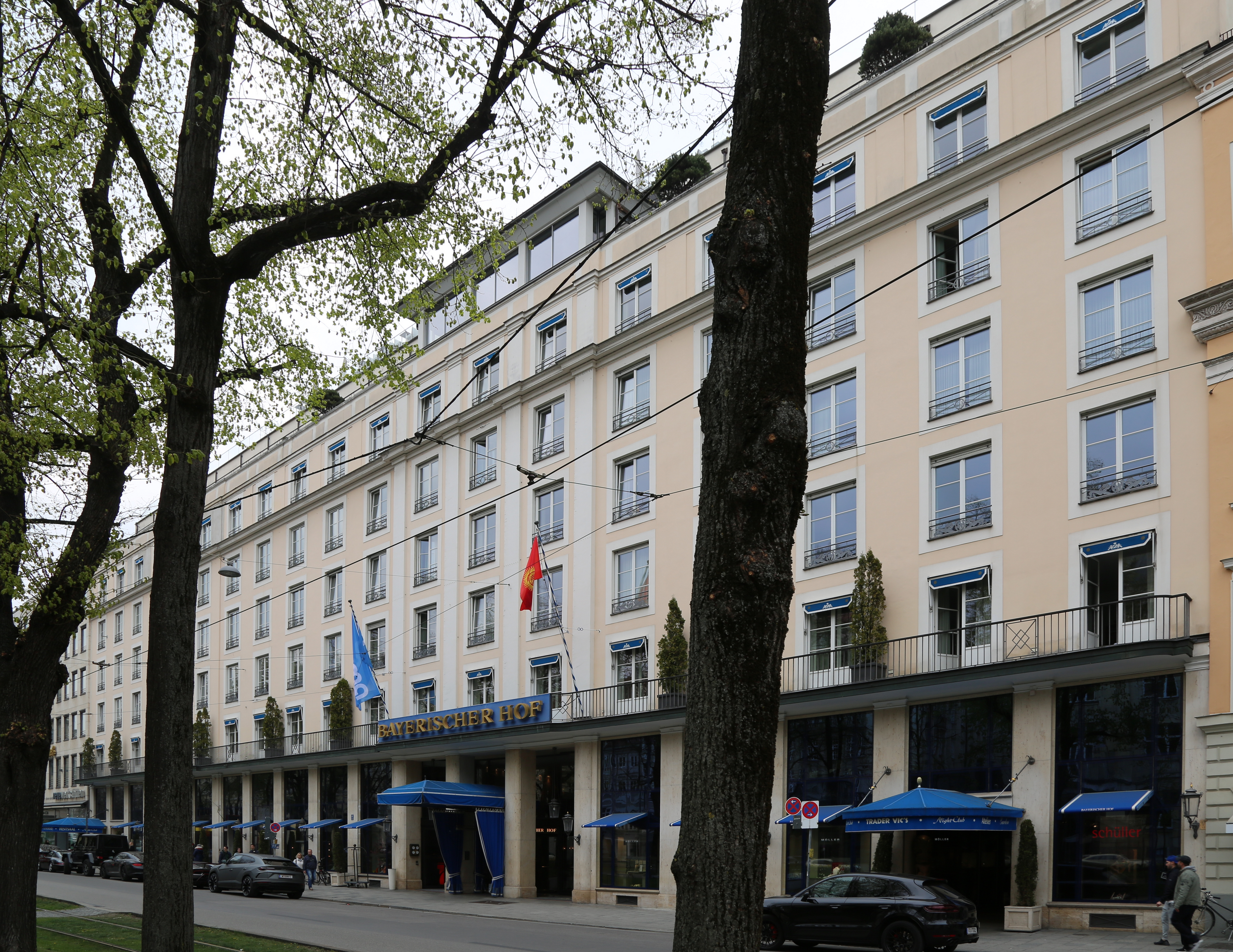

General information
- Type: Luxury hotel
- Location: Munich, Bavaria, Germany, Promenadeplatz 2–6, Altstadt
- Opened: 1841
- Owner: Gebrüder Volkhardt KG
- Affiliation: The Leading Hotels of the World

Website
- bayerischerhof.de

Hotel Bayerischer Hof is a luxury hotel located at Promenadeplatz 2–6 in the Altstadt district of Munich in Bavaria, Germany. Established in 1841, the current building was completed in 1961. The hotel remains a destination for celebrities and guests of state in Munich. It is the venue for the annual Munich Security Conference.

== History ==
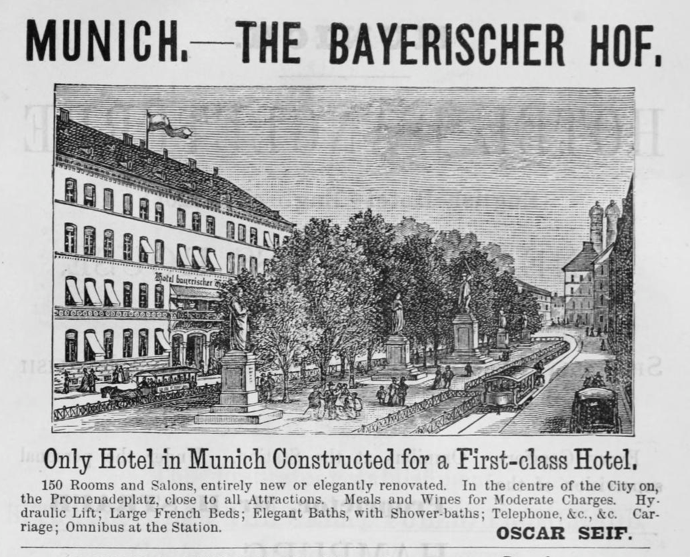
1885 ad for the hotel

The Bayerischer Hof opened on October 15, 1841. It was constructed by Joseph Anton von Maffei and designed by Friedrich von Gärtner. The original structure had about 100 rooms and two banquet halls. Some of its renowned guests included Empress Elisabeth of Austria and Sigmund Freud. In 1897 the hotel was purchased for 2,850,000 Marks by Herrmann Volkhardt, who purchased additional adjoining properties and rebuilt the hotel in the Neo-Renaissance style. The hotel hosted performances in the grand ballroom by artists like Enrico Caruso. Herrmann Volkhardt died in 1909 and left the hotel to his three sons – Hermann, Ernst and Wilhelm, with Hermann managing the property.

The Bayerischer Hof was almost completely destroyed in an Allied air raid on April 25, 1944, with only the Spiegelsaal (Hall of Mirrors) surviving. On October 22, 1945, Hermann Volkhardt and his son Falk established Munich's first post-war restaurant in the Spiegelsaal. The hotel was rebuilt in stages, with 74 rooms open by 1949 and 250 beds in 1951. Hermann Volkhart died in 1955, and Falk purchased the remaining 2/3 of the property from his two uncles by 1959. Between 1959 and 1961, Falk Volkhardt completed construction of the modern seven-story, 71-meter hotel structure at Promenadeplatz.

== Palais Montgelas ==
In 1969, Falk Volkhardt purchased the historic adjoining Palais Montgelas, and renovated it as an additional wing of the hotel, containing multiple historic function rooms. The renovations, designed by Erwin Schleich, were completed in time for the 1972 Munich Olympics. The palace was built in 1811–1813 by Emanuel Graf Maximilian Herigoyen for Maximilian von Montgelas. From 1817 to 1933, the palace was the service building of the Bavarian Ministry of Foreign Affairs (until 1918: State Ministry of the Royal Household and of Foreign Affairs) and from 1933 to 1945, the first official residence of the Bavarian State Chancellery.

== Facilities ==
The hotel offers 340 rooms of different styles, 60 suites, 40 meeting rooms, five restaurants, a breakfast room on the roof garden and six bars. The hotel's spa is located in the upper area of the hotel and stretches over three floors. It was built according to plans by the French interior designer Andrée Putman. It provides a sauna, a swimming pool with sun terraces, a bar and a lounge. The gym overlooking the Frauenkirche was designed by Ralf Möller. The entire seventh floor was renovated and offers a VIP area.

Located on the ground floor is the hotel's Komödie im Bayerischen Hof and the nightclub Bayerischer Hof with daily live performances of jazz, blues and soul musicians.

== Operation ==
The hotel has 585 employees, including 100 apprentices and has been family owned since 1897. Operator is the Gebrüder Volkhardt KG. Managing Partner since 2004 is Innegrit Volkhardt.

== Awards ==
The Hotel Bayerischer Hof has received numerous awards, including:

- The Leading Hotels of the World
- World Hotel Award – Award in the category Classic Hotel 2007
- Veuve Clicquot – Entrepreneur of the Year 2000
- Gault Millau – Best Bar Germany, Falk's Bar
- Global Finance – Best Business Hotel Munich 2005

== Events ==
The Munich Security Conference is held yearly in February at the Bayerischer Hof. The Jazz Summer of Hotel Bayerischer Hof in July, as a continuation of the 1999 abandoned Münchner Klaviersommer, in which the Bayerischer Hof has been involved in since 1992.
