= Đukanović VI Cabinet =

Government of Montenegro

- 40th Cabinet of Montenegro
- 2012–2016
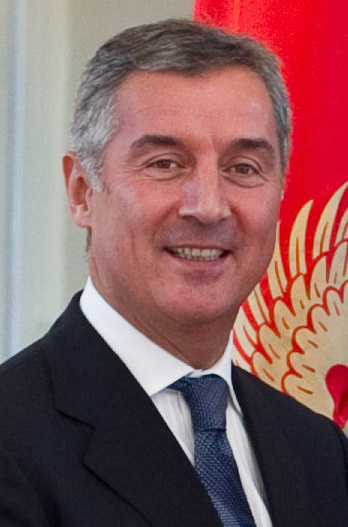
- Date formed: 4 December 2012
- Date dissolved: 28 November 2016

People and organisations
- Head of government: Milo Đukanović
- No. of ministers: 20 (1 of them without portfolio)
- Member parties: DPS, SDP, BS, HGI (2012–2016); DPS, SD, PCG, SDP, DEMOS, BS, HGI (2016)
- Status in legislature: Coalition government (2012–2016); Provisional government (2016)

History
- Election: 14 October 2012
- Predecessor: Lukšić Cabinet
- Successor: Marković Cabinet

The sixth cabinet of Milo Đukanović was the cabinet of Montenegro from 4 December 2012 to 28 November 2016. It was a coalition government composed of centre-left Coalition for a European Montenegro (DPS and SDP) and national minority parties. Split in the ruling DPS-SDP coalition in January 2016, leaving the government functioning as a de facto minority government. The Cabinet was functioning as the provisional government (of electoral trust), from 12 May to 28 November 2016, with several Ministers from opposition parties joined the government.

== Government formation ==
=== 2012 election ===
Elections for the composition of new parliament of Montenegro were held on October 14, 2012, and resulted in a new victory for the ruling Coalition for a European Montenegro led by Democratic Party of Socialists (DPS) of former PM Milo Đukanović, which has been in power since introduction of multi-party system in 1990.

=== Forming majority ===
Although the Coalition for a European Montenegro failed to win the majority on its own, they succeeded in remaining in power once again, forming a government with the national minority parties.

The sixth cabinet of Milo Đukanović was elected on December 4, 2012, by the parliament of Montenegro. The governing coalition was formed by Coatition for a European Montenegro members Democratic Party of Socialists and Social Democratic Party and national minorities parties Bosniak Party and Croatian Civic Initiative, which run independently.

== Cabinet composition ==
Portfolio	Minister	Party	Took office
Prime Minister
General Affairs	Milo Đukanović	DPS	4 December 2012
Deputy Prime Ministers
Justice	Duško Marković	DPS	29 December 2010
Economic and Financial Policy	Vujica Lazović	SDP	10 June 2009
Regional Development	Rafet Husović	BS	4 December 2012
Foreign Affairs	Igor Lukšić	DPS	4 December 2012
Ministers
Agriculture and Rural Development	Petar Ivanović	DPS	4 December 2012
Defence	Milica Pejanović	DPS	4 December 2012
Finance	Radoje Žugić	DPS	4 December 2012
Education and Sport	Migo Stijepović	DPS	29 December 2010
Science	Sanja Vlahović	DPS	29 December 2010
Culture	Branislav Mićunović	DPS	10 June 2009
Economy	Vladimir Kavarić	DPS	29 December 2010
Traffics and Naval Affairs	Ivan Brajović	SDP	4 December 2012
Sustainable Development and Tourism	Branimir Gvozdenović	DPS	4 December 2012
Health	Miodrag Radunović	DPS	10 June 2009
Human and Minority Rights	Suad Numanović	DPS	4 December 2012
Labour and Social Welfare	Predrag Bošković	DPS	4 December 2012
Internal Affairs	Raško Konjević	SDP	4 December 2012
Without Portfolio	Marija Vučinović	HGI	4 December 2012

== Political crisis, 2015-16 ==
In 2015, the investigative journalists' network OCCRP named Montenegrin Prime Minister Milo Đukanović "Person of the Year in Organized Crime". The extent of Đukanović's corruption led to street demonstrations and calls for his removal.

=== Opposition protests ===
A political crisis in Montenegro was initiated by the opposition Democratic Front (DF) which staged protests requesting fair elections and transitional government. DF organised continuous protests in October 2015 which culminated in a large riot in Podgorica on 24 October.

=== DPS-SDP split ===
On January 27, 2016, a parliamentary vote saw the split of the ruling DPS and up until then coalition partner SDP. This followed a failed crisis talk over the organization of the "first free and fair election". The President of the National Assembly Ranko Krivokapić (SDP) strongly criticized Prime Minister Milo Đukanović and the ruling party (DPS). With the split of SDP, Đukanović lost the Assembly majority. Đukanović started an initiative to remove Krivokapić from the seat. A split in the ruling coalition followed in January 2016, leaving the government functioning as a de facto minority government.

=== Government confidence voting ===
On 27 January 2016, despite formerly being an opposition party, Positive Montenegro (PCG) provided the ruling DPS with 3 votes necessary to win the government confidence vote, after the junior partner SDP left the government due to allegations of electoral fraud and political corruption, therefore forming a new ruling majority. Following this vote, national media and other opposition parties accused PCG for deceiving and betraying its voters in order to save Prime Minister Đukanović. In turn, in June 2016 Darko Pajović (PCG) was appointed as the President of the Parliament, position formerly held by Ranko Krivokapić (SDP), and held the position until October 2016.

Government confidence voting Milo Đukanović (DPS)
Ballot →	27 January 2016
Required majority →	41 out of 81
Yes: • DPS-LP (31); • SD (3); • BS (3); • PCG (3); • Forca (1); • HGI (1)	42 / 81
No: • SNP (7); • SDP (5); • Demos (4); • URA (2); • Ind. (2)	20 / 81
Absentees: • DF (16); • DCG (2); • Ind. (1)	19 / 81

=== Provisional government ===
The provisional government of electoral trust was elected on May 12, 2016, by the parliament of Montenegro. The provisional governing coalition was formed by DPS and several opposition parties.

Portfolio	Minister	Party	Took office
Prime Minister
General Affairs	Milo Đukanović	DPS	4 December 2012
Deputy Prime Ministers
Administration, Internal and Foreign Policy	Duško Marković	DPS	12 May 2016
Economic and Financial Policy	Vujica Lazović	SD	10 june 2009
Regional Development	Rafet Husović	BS	4 December 2012
General Affairs	Petar Ivanović	DPS	12 May 2016
General Affairs	Milorad Vujović	none	12 May 2016
General Affairs	Azra Jasavić	PCG	12 May 2016
Ministers
Justice	Zoran Pažin	none	12 May 2016
Defence	Milica Pejanović	DPS	4 December 2012
Finance	Raško Konjević	SDP	12 May 2016
Education	Predrag Bošković	DPS	14 March 2015
Science	Sanja Vlahović	DPS	29 December 2010
Culture	Pavle Goranović	none	18 March 2015
Economy	Vladimir Kavarić	DPS	29 December 2010
Traffics and Naval Affairs	Ivan Brajović	SD	4 December 2012
Agriculture and Rural Development	Budimir Mugoša	none	12 May 2016
Sustainable Development and Tourism	Branimir Gvozdenović	DPS	4 December 2012
Health	Budimir Šegrt	none	18 March 2015
Human and Minority Rights	Suad Numanović	DPS	4 December 2012
Labour and Social Welfare	Boris Marić	none	12 May 2016
Internal Affairs	Goran Danilović	DEMOS	12 May 2016
Without Portfolio	Marija Vučinović	HGI	4 December 2012

== See also ==
- Milo Đukanović
- Government of Montenegro
