= Željko Šturanović =

Prime Minister of Montenegro from 2006 to 2008

- Жељко Штурановић
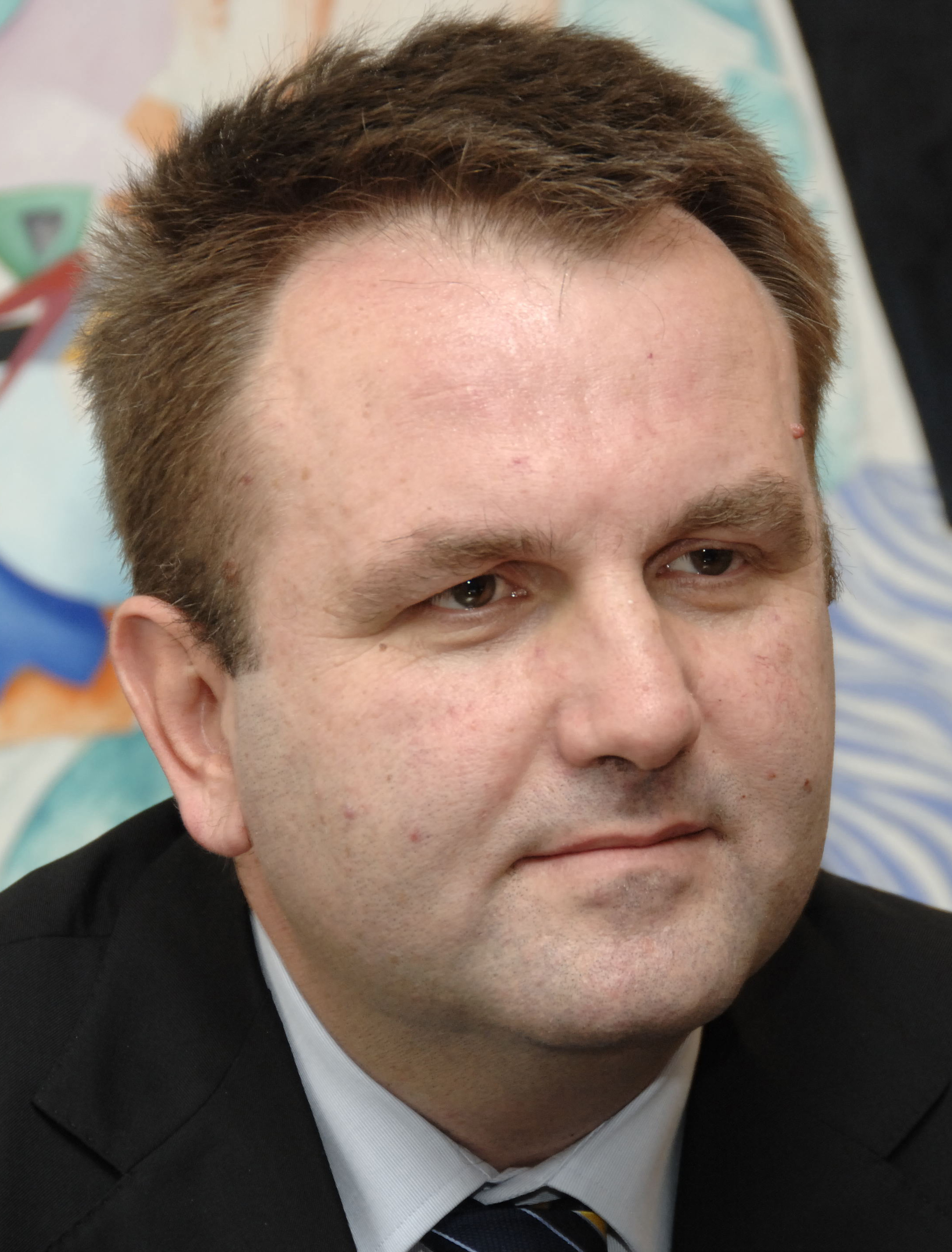
- Šturanović in 2007

Prime Minister of Montenegro
- In office 10 November 2006 – 29 February 2008
- President: Filip Vujanović
- Preceded by: Milo Đukanović
- Succeeded by: Milo Đukanović

Personal details
- Born: 31 January 1960 Nikšić, PR Montenegro, Yugoslavia
- Died: 30 June 2014 (aged 54) Paris, France
- Party: Democratic Party of Socialists

Željko Šturanović (Montenegrin Cyrillic: Жељко Штурановић; 31 January 1960 – 30 June 2014) was a Montenegrin politician who was the Prime Minister of Montenegro from 2006 until his resignation in 2008.

== Early life ==
Šturanović was born in Nikšić, in what was then the People's Republic of Montenegro, part of the Federal People's Republic of Yugoslavia.

== Prime Minister of Montenegro ==
=== Appointment as Prime Minister ===
Šturanović served as Minister of Justice in Prime Minister Milo Đukanović's government. After Đukanović's announcement on 3 October 2006 that he would not accept the nomination for the position of Prime Minister again, Šturanović was selected as a candidate for the position by the leaders of his party the following day. He was welcomed even by Montenegrin Opposition, which is otherwise known to be a harsh critic of the ruling coalition.

Šturanović and his government were elected by the Montenegrin parliament on November 10, 2006. The 14-member government, including two deputy prime ministers, was approved by a 42 to 28 vote. Šturanović was sworn in on the same day.

=== Premiership and resignation ===
On the eve of January 20, 2007, Šturanović was in Belgrade at Boris Tadić's Democratic Party during its campaign for the parliamentary election.

After becoming prime minister, he was diagnosed as having a rare tumour of the lung but was for the time being considered fit to continue as prime minister. At the time DPS President and former Prime Minister Đukanović assisted him in his administrative duties.

Šturanović signed the Stabilization and Association Agreement on behalf of the Government of Montenegro on 15 March 2007.

He resigned on 31 January 2008 for health reasons, saying that the therapy he was prescribed required him to work much less than would be possible while serving as prime minister. He remained in office until Đukanović was approved by Parliament and sworn in at the end of February. He died in Paris at the age of 54 on 30 June 2014.

=== Cabinet ===
Portfolio	Minister	Party	Took office
Prime Minister
General Affairs	Željko Šturanović	DPS	10 November 2006
Deputy Prime Ministers
European integration	Gordana Đurović	DPS	10 November 2006
Economic and Financial Policy	Vujica Lazović	SDP	10 November 2006
Ministers
Finance	Igor Lukšić	DPS	14 February 2004
Justice	Miraš Radović	DPS	10 November 2006
Foreign Affairs	Milan Roćen	DPS	10 November 2006
Agriculture and Rural Development	Milutin Simović	DPS	10 November 2006
Defence	Boro Vučinić	DPS	10 November 2006
Economic development	Branimir Gvozdenović	DPS	10 November 2006
Education and Science	Slobodan Backović	DPS	10 November 2006
Culture and Sports	Predrag Sekulić	DPS	10 November 2006
Traffics and Naval Affairs	Andrija Lompar	SDP	10 November 2006
Sustainable Development and Tourism	Predrag Nenezić	DPS	10 November 2006
Health	Miodrag Radunović	DPS	10 November 2006
Human and Minority Rights	Fuad Nimani	DUA	10 November 2006
Internal Affairs	Jusuf Kalamperović	SDP	8 January 2003
Without Portfolio	Suad Numanović	DPS	10 November 2006
