= Branimir Gvozdenović =

Montenegrin politician

Branimir Gvozdenović Бранимир Гвозденовић

Deputy Prime Minister of Montenegro
- In office July 2, 2001 – January 8, 2003 Serving with Dragan Đurović, Žarko Rakčević
- Prime Minister: Filip Vujanović
- In office January 8, 2003 – November 10, 2006 Serving with Dragan Đurović, Jusuf Kalamperović, Miroslav Ivanišević
- Prime Minister: Milo Đukanović

Personal details
- Born: 1961 (age 64–65) Bar, FPR Yugoslavia (now Bar, Montenegro)
- Party: Democratic Party of Socialists
- Spouse: Marijana Gvozdenović
- Children: Marko, Marija
- Education: University of Montenegro
- Profession: Politician

Branimir Gvozdenović (Montenegrin Cyrillic: Бранимир Гвозденовић; born 1961) is a Montenegrin politician who has served as Deputy Prime Minister in the Government of Montenegro, as well as Minister of Economic Development, Minister of Spatial Planning and Environment, and Minister of Sustainable Development and Tourism, in several DPS-led governments between 1990s and 2016. Gvozdenović most recently served as the Deputy Speaker of the Parliament of Montenegro, from 2016 until 2020. He's a high-ranking member of the DPS, which ruled Montenegro since 1990 until 2020 parliamentary election.

== Political career ==
Gvozdenović served three terms as Deputy Prime Minister, beginning in 2003 as part of the cabinet of Prime Minister Filip Vujanović and then continuing for Prime Minister Milo Đukanović.

On February 29, 2008, Gvozdenović was appointed Minister for Economic Development. He held that post until June 9, 2009, when he was appointed Minister of Spatial Planning and Environment.

In 2010, Gvozdenović was the Political Director of the ruling Democratic Party of Socialists, a post he held until December 4, 2012, when he was appointed Minister of Sustainable Development and Tourism.

== Personal life ==
Gvozdenović has an electrical engineering degree from the University of Podgorica. He is married to Marijana, and has 2 children: Marko and Marija. He is the uncle of Canadian tennis player Milos Raonic.
