= Predrag Bošković =

Montenegrin politician and sports administrator

- Предраг Бошковић
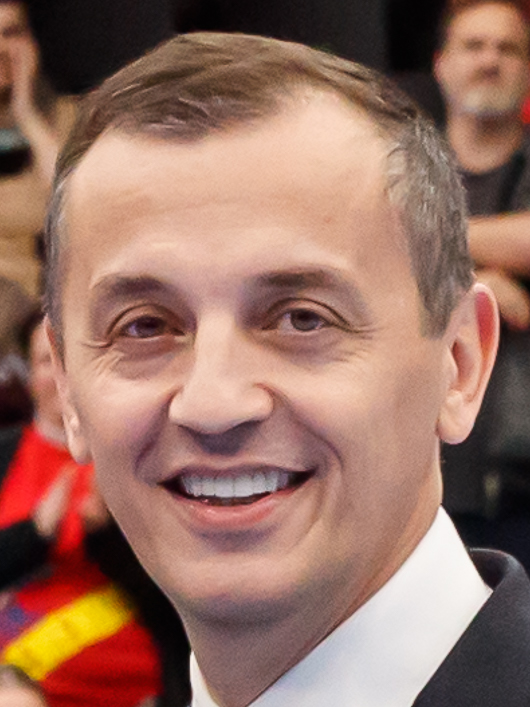
- Predrag Bošković in 2023

Member of Parliament of Montenegro
- Incumbent
- Assumed office 23 September 2020
- President: Aleksa Bečić
- In office 22 April 2001 – November 2005
- President: Ranko Krivokapić

Vice-President of European Handball Federation
- Incumbent
- Assumed office 17 November 2016
- President: Michael Wiederer
- Preceded by: Arne Elovsson

Minister of Defence of Montenegro
- In office 28 November 2016 – 4 December 2020
- Prime Minister: Duško Marković
- Preceded by: Milica Pejanović
- Succeeded by: Olivera Injac

Minister of Education of Montenegro
- In office 14 March 2015 – 28 November 2016
- Prime Minister: Milo Đukanović
- Preceded by: Migo Stijepović
- Succeeded by: Damir Šehović

Minister of Labor and Social Welfare
- In office 4 December 2012 – 14 March 2015
- Prime Minister: Milo Đukanović
- Preceded by: Suad Numanović
- Succeeded by: Boris Marić

Minister of Economy of Montenegro
- In office November 2005 – 10 September 2006
- Prime Minister: Milo Đukanović
- Preceded by: Darko Uskoković
- Succeeded by: Vujica Lazović

Personal details
- Born: 12 March 1972 (age 54) Pljevlja, SR Montenegro, SFR Yugoslavia (now Montenegro)
- Party: Democratic Party of Socialists
- Other political affiliations: Serbian National Renewal (1990—1991)
- Education: University of Montenegro
- Occupation: Politician, sports administrator

Predrag Bošković (Montenegrin Cyrillic: Предраг Бошковић; born 12 March 1972) is a Montenegrin politician and sports administrator. Currently he is a member of the Parliament of Montenegro, and the former Minister of Defence of Montenegro. Bošković is an economist and has been involved in politics since 1997. He was a member of the Montenegrin Parliament, the Deputy Minister of Foreign Affairs in the Government of Serbia and Montenegro. He served also as Minister of Economy, as Minister of Labor and Social Welfare and as Minister of Education in various Montenegrin governments.

Concurrently, he is the Vice-President of the European Handball Federation and member of the International Handball Federation Council.

== Early life and education ==
Predrag Bošković was born in Pljevlja, Yugoslavia, as the second child in the family of Milenko and Milana Bošković.One year before he was born his parents and brother Dragan were supposed to move to Germany, but they ultimately decided to stay in Pljevlja. Father Milenko has greatly influenced Predrag's life and still remains an important source of his inspiration.

At the age of 7, Bošković moved to Podgorica where he finished both primary and high school. Even though he was keen on pursuing career in electrical engineering, he graduated in 1996 from the Faculty of Economics at the University of Montenegro. As a student he was actively involved in the work of the Entrepreneurial club at the Faculty of Economics.

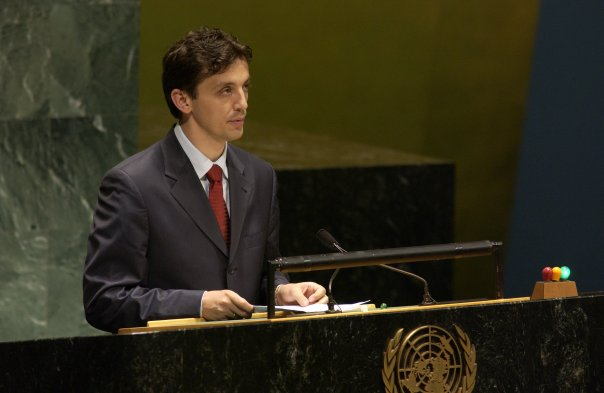
Predrag Bošković delivering a speech at the United Nations General Assembly (2005).

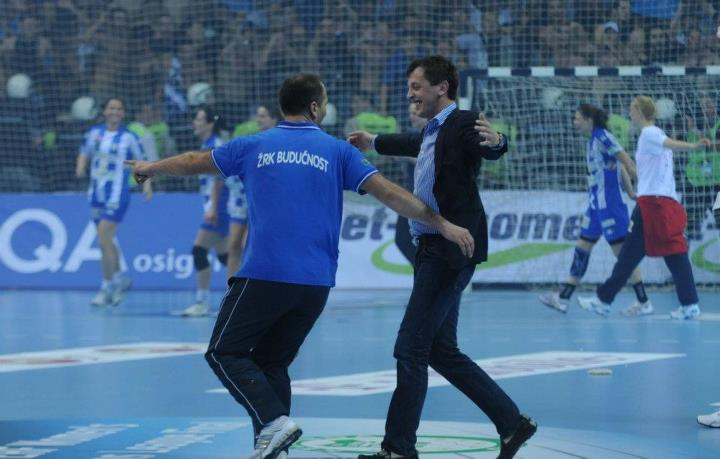
Celebrating European Championship League Title with Dragan Adzic, coach of the Women's Handball Club Buducnost (2012)

He started his academic career as a Teaching Assistant at the Faculty of Economics, University of Montenegro, where he thought courses in Statistics and Econometrics. This is still the main area of his research interests. In 1999, he received his master's degree at the Faculty of Economics, University of Belgrade.

Bošković successfully completed many educational trainings in the areas of economics and econometrics. The most important training was the one on the Time series and predictions of election results, organized by the Central European University (CEU) in Budapest in October 1997.

Before devoting most of the time to his political career he published several papers in both domestic and international journals.

== Political career ==
Bošković became a member of the Democratic Party of Socialists (DPS) in 1997, and was the president of the DPS Youth club from 1998-2002. Achieved results recommended him for the later responsible positions in Montenegrin politics.

The general public learned about Boskovic in mid-2001 when, as president of the DPS Youth Club and a member of the Parliament of Montenegro, he announced a lawsuit against the newspaper Dan for a text claiming he was a volunteer in the Croatian War of Independence as a member of the Serbian National Renewal and a paramilitary White Eagles unit. Up to this day, he has not filed a lawsuit against Dan. According to Monitor, Bošković's acquaintances then recalled that Bošković was committed to the Greater Serbia project and that he demonstrated this at the Faculty of Economics in Podgorica, wearing a conspicuously large silver ring engraved with a Serbian cross.

In 2000 he became a member of the Podgorica City Council and later a member of the Montenegrin Parliament from 2001-2004, after which he got elected the Deputy Minister of Foreign Affairs in the Government of Serbia and Montenegro. During his term as the Deputy Minister (April 2004 – November 2005) he represented the country during many international visits..In June 2005, Boskovic delivered a speech on the importance of non-proliferation of weapons of mass destruction in front of the United Nations General Assembly. He also took part in numerous bilateral meetings with high representatives of many foreign countries from all over the world.

From November 2005 to September 2006 he served as the Minister of Economy in the Government of Montenegro.

From September 2006 to August 2008 he was the president of the Board of Directors of Montenegrobonus (a prominent Montenegrin oil and gas trade company).

In August 2008 he was elected the president of the Coalmine "Pljevlja".The company had suffered major losses for many consecutive years prior to his appointment. Bošković immediately introduced many organizational and strategic changes, and as a result the company started to incur profits. Moreover, the company is one of the most successful companies in Montenegro today.

In December 2012 he was elected Minister of Labor and Social Welfare. He remained at this position until March 2015, when he became Minister of Education.

On 28 November 2016 he was elected as Minister of Defense of the Republic of Montenegro, leaving his previous post as Minister of Education.

== Controversies ==
Predrag Bošković was arrested at Podgorica Airport on 6 October 2025, on the orders of the Special State Prosecutor's Office. He is suspected of being part of an organized crime group that was undermining Montenegro's security system, and which was particularly active in attacks on political opponents during and after the 2019-2020 clerical protests in Montenegro. He was released from custody a day later.

== Handball ==
Being sportsman himself, Bošković got involved in Montenegrin handball in 2005 when he became a board member of the Women's Handball Club, Budućnost. In December 2006 he became the president of the club. After his election, he set the European Champions League title as a medium-term goal. Starting from his election, all the decisions were made keeping this goal in mind, for which general public criticized him quite often. On 13 May 2012 WHC "Budućnost" won its first European Handball Federation Champions League (EHFCL) title. Prior to this historical triumph, the club lost seven EHFCL semifinals. During Boskovic's presidency the club also won the second Champions League title in 2015, eleven domestic championships (2007-2017), six regional league titles (2010-2015), one Cup Winner's Cup (CWC) title in 2010 and was also the semifinalist of the EHFCL in 2011, 2016 and 2017 and the finalist in 2014. Due to obligations in EHF, Boskovic resigned as president of Handball Club Buducnost on 12 March 2018.

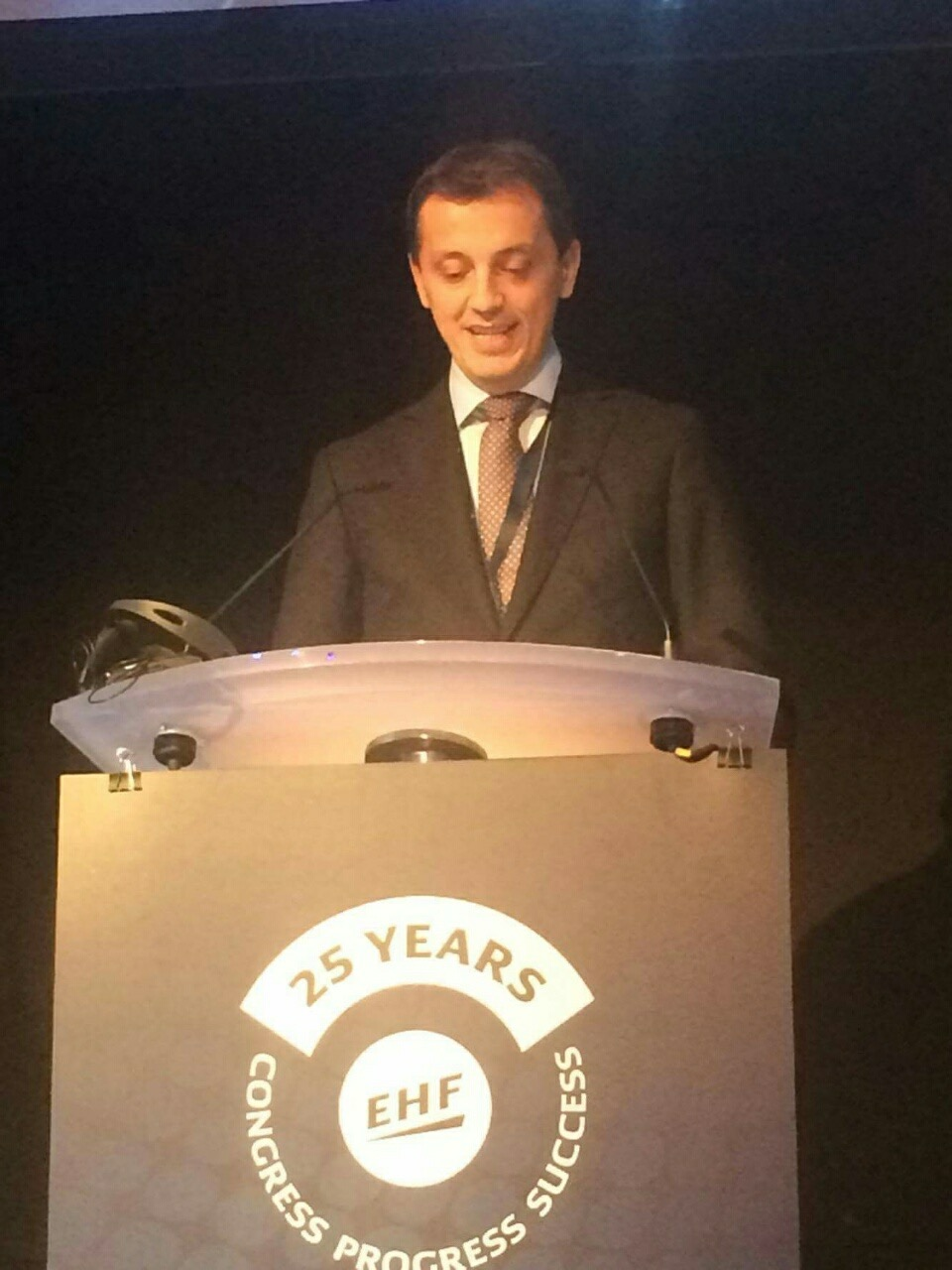
Giving a speech after election for the Vice President of the EHF (17 November 2016)

In 2011 he was the elected president of the Montenegrin Handball Association and held this position until September 2016 when he stepped down due to the candidacy for the vice-president of the European Handball Federation. In 2012 both men's and women's national teams accomplished the best results in their history. The men's national team qualified for the World Handball Championship, that was held in Spain in 2013 Few months after that, on 11 August, women's national team won the silver medal at the London 2012 Olympics. This medal is viewed as a historical achievement since it is the first Olympic medal for Montenegro since its independence in 2006. The great year for Montenegrin handball was crowned with the European Championship title which Montenegrin Women's Handball Team won on 16 December 2012.

Many analysts and organizations, including the International Handball Federation (IHF), agree that Bošković is one of the people who have contributed the most to the immense success of the Montenegrin handball. The IHF even referred to him as the "father of success". Recognizing his stellar work, the European Handball Federation (EHF) elected Boskovic as an Executive Committee (ExeC) Member in June 2012. Furthermore, he was elected as the EHF Vice President and IHF Council Member in November 2016.

== Personal life ==
Predrag Boskovic is married to Stela Boskovic, who works in the Societe Generale Montenegro Bank.

=== Contribution to Serbian Church ===
For his contribution to the Serbian Orthodox Church Bošković was awarded with the Order of St. Sava. He was excommunicated by the Serbian Orthodox Church in late December 2019, when he gave support to the newly proclaimed religion law which de jure transfers the ownership of church buildings and estates from the Serbian Orthodox Church in Montenegro to the Montenegrin state. "I will be pleased to return award" stated Bošković after the law passed in the Parliament of Montenegro.
