= Raško Konjević =

Montenegrin politician

- Рашко Коњевић

Deputy Prime Minister of Montenegro
- In office 28 April 2022 – 21 October 2022
- Prime Minister: Dritan Abazović

Minister of Defence
- In office 28 April 2022 – 21 October 2022
- Prime Minister: Dritan Abazović
- Preceded by: Olivera Injac

Member of Parliament
- In office 23 September 2021 – 28 April 2022
- In office 2009–2012

Minister of Finance
- In office 12 May 2016 – 28 November 2016
- Prime Minister: Milo Đukanović
- Preceded by: Radoje Žugić
- Succeeded by: Darko Radunović

Minister of Internal Affairs
- In office 4 December 2012 – 12 May 2016
- Prime Minister: Igor Lukšić
- Preceded by: Ivan Brajović
- Succeeded by: Goran Danilović

Personal details
- Born: 12 April 1979 (age 47) Zenica, SFR Bosnia and Herzegovina, SFR Yugoslavia
- Party: Social Democratic Party
- Education: University of Montenegro

Raško Konjević (Montenegrin Cyrillic: Рашко Коњевић; born 12 April 1979) is a Montenegrin politician. He previously served as a member of the Parliament of Montenegro.

== Biography ==
Konjević graduated and obtained a master's degree at the Faculty of Economics at the University of Montenegro. He was a Minister of Interior Affairs in cabinet of Igor Lukšić (2010–2012) and in 6th cabinet of Milo Đukanović (2012–16) and later Minister of Finance in the provisional Government of Montenegro that lasted from May to November 2016. Following the October 2016 parliamentary election, he was elected Member of Parliament. He was elected MP once again in 2020.

Since 28 April 2022, he has been serving as the deputy prime minister of Montenegro and the minister of defence in the minority government of Dritan Abazović.
