= Milica Pejanović-Đurišić =

Montenegrin politician

- Милица Пејановић-Ђуришић
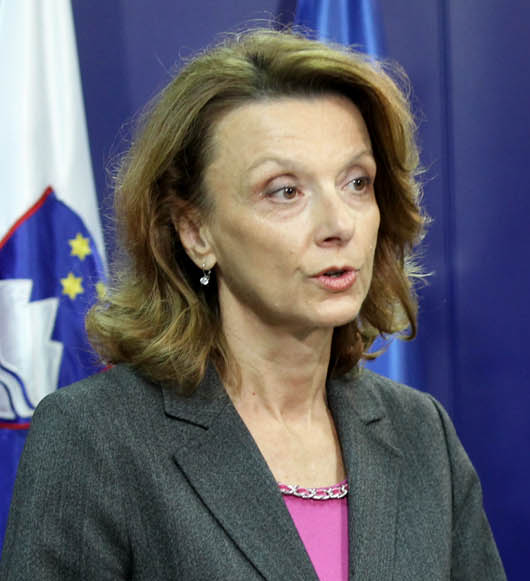
- Pejanović-Đurišić in 2015

Minister of Defence of Montenegro
- In office 13 March 2012 – 28 November 2016
- Prime Minister: Milo Đukanović
- Preceded by: Boro Vučinić
- Succeeded by: Predrag Bošković

President of Democratic Party of Socialists
- In office 19 October 1997 – 31 October 1998
- Preceded by: Momir Bulatović
- Succeeded by: Milo Đukanović

President of the League of Communists of Montenegro
- In office 26 April 1989 – 28 April 1989
- Preceded by: Veselin Vukotić
- Succeeded by: Momir Bulatović

Personal details
- Born: 27 April 1959 (age 67) Nikšić, PR Montenegro, FPR Yugoslavia
- Party: Independent
- Other political affiliations: DPS (1991–2020); SKCG (until 1991)
- Education: University of Belgrade
- Occupation: Professor, politician

Milica Pejanović-Đurišić (Montenegrin Cyrillic: Милица Пејановић-Ђуришић; born 27 April 1959) is a Montenegrin professor and politician who was Minister of Defense from 2012 to 2016. She is the first woman to hold this office. She has been serving as Ambassador of Montenegro to the United Nations since 2018.

== Political career ==
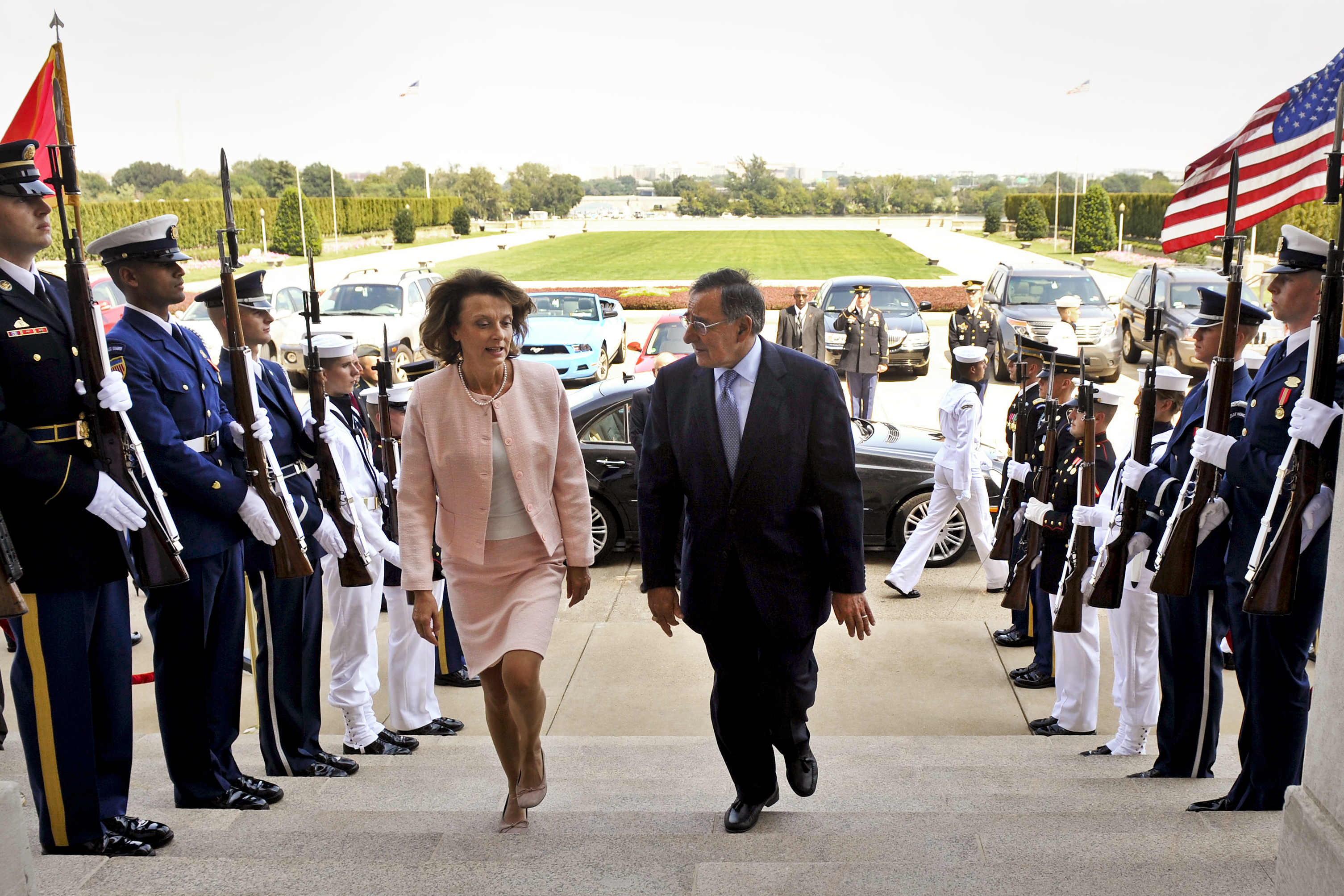
Pejanović-Đurišić with U.S. Defense Secretary Leon E. Panetta, Pentagon, 6 September 2012

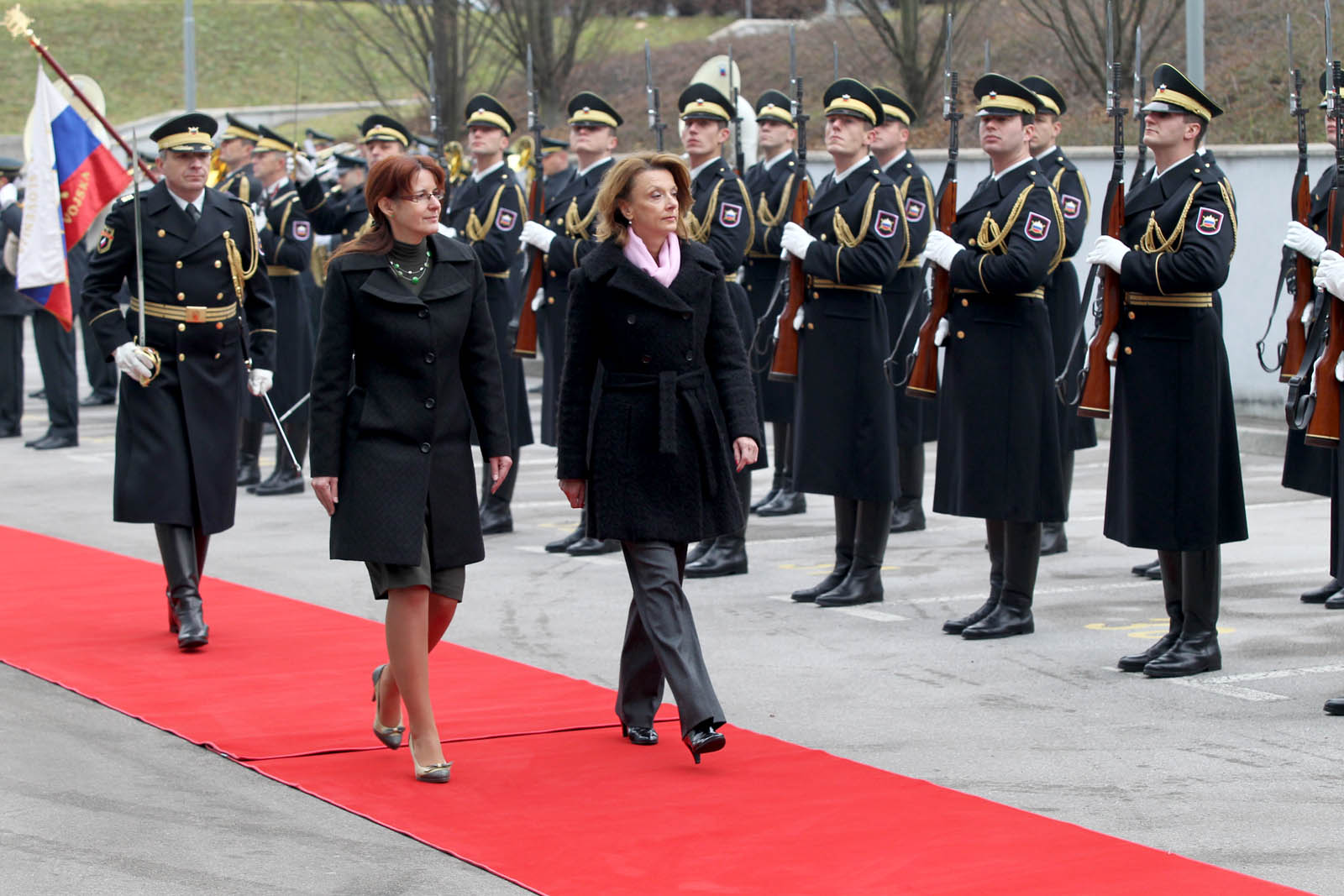
Pejanović-Đurišić during an official visit to Slovenia in 2015

=== Anti-bureaucratic revolution and the DPS foundation ===
Pejanović-Đurišić was active in the League of Communists of Yugoslavia, where Momir Bulatović chose her as a board member on the organizational committee which replaced the older communists during the anti-bureaucratic revolution in Montenegro in January 1989. When Yugoslavia began to break up, she supported Montenegro remaining in Yugoslavia in 1992.

=== Split in the Democratic Party of Socialists ===
In 1997, when the Democratic Party of Socialists began to split between Đukanović and Bulatović, she initially was closer to Bulatović. However, she abruptly cut herself off from Bulatović after one of the DPS committee meetings, after which she was chosen to be the new president by the DPS. In addition to consolidating power with Đukanović, her split from Bulatović resulted in an explosive feud, as Bulatović called her "Mata Hari in a nightgown", and accused her of "selling her soul" for "shares in Crnogorski Telekom". Pejanović-Đurišić responded to the accusations with a statement saying that "Bulatović is a given contradiction, he's Robin Hood and Pol Pot, Šćepan Mali and Vojislav Šešelj, and in fact their miserable surrogate...his political end will be sad."

=== Crnogorski Telekom ===
Pejanović-Đurišić became the president of the board of Crnogorski Telekom while retaining her position in DPS. Opposition parties accused her of using an illegal loophole for privatizing Telekom, although a court case ruled that she did not break the law. She participated in the formulation of the 2001 tender for Telekom, the state's first attempt of privatizing the telecommunications operator.

She advocated for a "phased" privatization of Telekom, arguing that a privatization in phases would guarantee the state would have a certain amount of company shares "in any variant".

=== Ambassador of Serbia and Montenegro ===
From February 2004 to July 2006, she served as the Ambassador of Serbia and Montenegro to Belgium and Luxembourg. After Montenegro's independence in 2006, she served as Montenegro's ambassador to France, Monaco (Pejanović-Đurišić being fluent in French) and UNESCO from February 2007 to 2010.

=== Minister of Defence of Montenegro ===
In 2012, Pejanovic-Djurisic was appointed as Minister of Defence in the Milo Đukanović's VI Cabinet of Montenegro, as a member and vice-president of the Đukanović's DPS. She was first female office holder of Minister of Defence of Montenegro. She was in office until October 2016, when she was replaced by Predrag Boskovic, also an DPS member.

== Bibliography ==
- Ivanović, Željko (2005). Crnogorski Diznilend. Podgorica: Daily Press - Vijesti. ISBN 86-7706-123-1.
- Morrison, Kenneth (2009). Nationalism, Identity and Statehood in Post-Yugoslav Montenegro. London: I.B. Tauris & Co Ltd. ISBN 978-1-84511-710-8.
