= Aco Đukanović =

Montenegrin businessman

Aleksandar "Aco" Đukanović (Montenegrin Cyrillic: Александар "Ацо" Ђукановић; born 1965) is a Montenegrin businessman, widely considered to be one of the richest and most powerful individuals in the country, along with Brano Mićunović, Vesko Barović, Dragan Brković and others from the Montenegrin nouveau riche class that emerged during the 1990s following the break-up of SFR Yugoslavia. Much of Đukanović's wealth and influence were achieved during his older brother Milo Đukanović's rule in Montenegro as Prime Minister and President of the Republic (1991–2006) and as the political party's (DPS) president and prime minister (2006–2023).

== Life ==
=== Early activities ===
Aco Đukanović's early business activity during the 1990s was folk concert booking, promotion and organizing through his first company Maraton.

=== 2000s ===
On June 4, 2000, Aco Đukanović and Pajo Jabučanin attacked LSCG activist Zoran "Feki" Kljajić in the lobby of Hotel Crna Gora (now Hilton Podgorica in Podgorica. Kljajić ended up with severe injuries for which he underwent emergency surgery. Jabučanin and Đukanović were detained by police after Đukanović confirmed he was involved in the incident. The case against Đukanović dragged in the courts for years before being acquitted in December 2004. On appeal, the re-trial was ordered, but in 2007 on the very first session of the re-trial the court concluded that the suit against Đukanović is too old.

His current company, Monte Nova, is a prominent and well known Montenegrin business. According to an annual report by the Central Bank of Montenegro in 2006, Monte Nova was the fourth most profitable company in Montenegro (most profitable among the companies with domestic ownership) with a profit of €8.1 million in that year. In November 2006, Monte Nova acquired Nikšićka banka.

Đukanović also held stake in Crnogorska komercijalna banka, which he sold to Hungarian OTP Bank for €10 million.

In January 2007, he bought 75% stake in Montenegrin urbanism authority for €2.7 million.

Around the same time he bought the documentation for the third mobile operator licence in Montenegro (now m:tel) but ended up not placing an official bid, and the license went to Telekom Srbija.
