= Secretary of the Presidency of the League of Communists of Montenegro =

Administrative leader of the League of Communists of Montenegro

- Montenegrin: Sekretar Predsjedništva Saveza komunista Crne Gore
- Emblems of the LCY

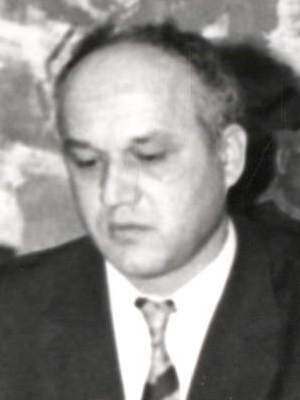
- Longest serving Vojislav Srzentić; October 1969 – 5 April 1974
- Type: Chief of staff
- Member of: SKCG Presidency
- Appointer: SKCG Presidency
- Term length: Two years, renewable (1972–1990)
- Constituting instrument: LCY Charter & SKCG Charter
- Formation: 14 November 1966
- First holder: Veselin Đuranović
- Final holder: Milo Đukanović
- Abolished: 22 June 1991

The secretary was the highest administrative leader of the Presidency of the Central Committee of the League of Communists of Montenegro (SKCG), the ruling party of the Socialist Republic of Montenegro (SR Montenegro) in the Socialist Federal Republic of Yugoslavia and a branch of the League of Communists of Yugoslavia (LCY). The officeholder was elected by and answerable to the SKCG Presidency.

== Office history ==
| Title | Established | Abolished | Established by |
|---|---|---|---|
| Secretary of the Executive Bureau of the Central Committee of the League of Communists of Montenegro; Montenegrin: Sekretar Izvršnog biroa Centralnog komiteta Saveza komunista Crne Gore | 14 November 1966 | 5 April 1974 | 7th Plenary Session of the Central Committee of the 4th Congress |
| Secretary of the Executive Committee of the Central Committee of the League of Communists of Montenegro; Montenegrin: Sekretar Izvršnog komiteta Centralnog komiteta Saveza komunista Crne Gore | 12 April 1974 | 1 July 1982 | 6th Congress of the League of Communists of Montenegro |
| Secretary of the Presidency of the Central Committee of the League of Communists of Montenegro; Montenegrin: Sekretar Predsedništva Centralnog komiteta Saveza komunista Crne Gore | 1 July 1982 | 22 June 1991 | 8th Congress of the League of Communists of Montenegro |

== Officeholders ==
Secretaries of the Presidency of the Central Committee of the League of Communists of Montenegro
| No. | Name | Took office | Left office | Tenure | Term of office | Birth | PM | Death | Ref. |
|---|---|---|---|---|---|---|---|---|---|
| 1 | Veselin Đuranović | 14 November 1966 | 14 December 1968 | 2 years, 30 days | 4th (1965–1968) | 1925 | 1944 | 1997 | |
| 2 | Dobroslav Ćulafić | 14 December 1968 | October 1969 | 291 days | 4th–5th (1965–1974) | 1926 | 1944 | 2011 | |
| 3 | Vojislav Srzentić | October 1969 | 5 April 1974 | 4 years, 186 days | 5th (1969–1974) | 1934 | 1952 | Alive | |
| 4 | Miljan Radović | 5 April 1974 | 26 April 1978 | 4 years, 21 days | 6th (1974–1978) | 1933 | 1951 | 2015 | |
| 5 | Vuko Vukadinović | 26 April 1978 | 28 April 1982 | 4 years, 2 days | 7th (1978–1982) | 1937 | 1956 | 1993 | |
| 6 | Velisav Vuksanović | 28 April 1982 | 23 April 1986 | 3 years, 360 days | 8th (1982–1986) | 1935 | 1952 | Alive | |
| 7 | Savo Šekarić | 23 April 1986 | 12 January 1989 | 2 years, 264 days | 9th (1986–1989) | 1935 | 1956 | ? | |
| 8 | Milo Đukanović | 28 April 1989 | 22 June 1991 | 2 years, 55 days | 10th (1989–1991) | 1962 | 1979 | Alive | |

== Bibliography ==
- Djukanović, Bojka (2023). Historical Dictionary of Montenegro. Rowman & Littlefield Publishers. ISBN 9781538139158.
- Lewytzkyj, Borys; Stroynowski, Juliusz, eds. (1978). Who's Who in the Socialist Countries. K. G. Saur Verlag. ISBN 3-7940-3017-6.
- Stroynowski, Juliusz, ed. (1989a). Who's Who in the Socialist Countries of Europe: A–H. K. G. Saur Verlag. ISBN 3-598-10719-6.
- Stroynowski, Juliusz, ed. (1989b). Who's Who in the Socialist Countries of Europe: I–O. K. G. Saur Verlag. ISBN 3-598-10719-6.
- Stroynowski, Juliusz, ed. (1989c). Who's Who in the Socialist Countries of Europe: P–Z. K. G. Saur Verlag. ISBN 3-598-10719-6.

=== Newspaper ===
- Staff writer (24 April 1986). "Снага Је У Заједништву" [The Strength is in Community]. Borba (in Serbo-Croatian). Socialist Alliance of Working People: 1.
