= Deputy Prime Minister of Montenegro =

The Deputy Prime Minister of Montenegro, officially Vice President of the Government of Montenegro (Montenegrin: Potpredsjednik Vlade Crne Gore), is the official Deputy of the Prime Minister of Montenegro.

Conventionally all of the junior partners in the coalition, get one deputy, they are ranked according to the size of their respective parties.

== History of the office ==
The office of the Deputy Prime Minister of Montenegro was established on 15 February 1991, during the first government of Milo Đukanović. It was initially held by three people: Blagoje Lučić, Vuk Ognjenović and Zoran Žižić. Since then, the office was usually held simultaneously by several people at the same time (in the government of Filip Vujanović there were five Deputy Prime Ministers at one point). Also, Deputy Prime Ministers may or may not combine the position with another government portfolio. Deputy Prime Minister in the 42nd cabinet of Montenegro is Dritan Abazović.

== List of deputy prime ministers ==
Name (Birth–Death)	Term of office		Political party
Blagoje Lučić	15 February 1991	14 July 1992	Democratic Party of Socialists
Vuk Ognjenović	15 February 1991	1 August 1992	Democratic Party of Socialists
Zoran Žižić	15 February 1991	24 December 1996	Democratic Party of Socialists
Mihailo Ljesar	1 August 1992	20 December 1993	Democratic Party of Socialists
Krunoslav Vukčević	1 August 1992	24 December 1996	Democratic Party of Socialists
Rade Perović	5 March 1993	24 December 1996	Democratic Party of Socialists
Asim Telaćević	1 February 1994	2 July 2001	Democratic Party of Socialists
Miodrag Vuković	24 December 1996	16 July 1998	Democratic Party of Socialists
Slavko Drljević	24 December 1996	8 July 1997	Independent
Milutin Lalić	8 July 1997	2 July 2001	Democratic Party of Socialists
Jovan Mihailović	8 July 1997	5 February 1998	Democratic Party of Socialists
Slavko Drljević	5 February 1998	16 July 1998	Independent
Predrag Drecun	5 February 1998	16 July 1998	People's Party
Predrag Goranović	16 July 1998	27 January 2000	Democratic Party of Socialists
Novak Kilibarda	16 July 1998	4 July 2000	People's Party
Dragiša Burzan	16 July 1998	2 July 2001	Social Democratic Party
Ljubiša Krgović	27 January 2000	2 July 2001	Democratic Party of Socialists
Savo Đurđevac	4 July 2000	28 February 2001	People's Party
Branimir Gvozdenović	2 July 2001	10 November 2006	Democratic Party of Socialists
Žarko Rakčević	2 July 2001	8 January 2003	Social Democratic Party
Dragan Đurović	2 July 2001	10 November 2006	Democratic Party of Socialists
Jusuf Kalamperović	8 January 2003	10 November 2006	Social Democratic Party
Miroslav Ivanišević	8 January 2003	10 November 2006	Democratic Party of Socialists
Gordana Đurović	10 November 2006	11 June 2009	Democratic Party of Socialists
Vujica Lazović	10 November 2006	28 November 2016	Social Democratic Party
Svetozar Marović	11 June 2009	29 December 2010	Democratic Party of Socialists
Igor Lukšić	11 June 2009	29 December 2010	Democratic Party of Socialists
Duško Marković	29 December 2010	28 November 2016	Democratic Party of Socialists
Igor Lukšić	4 December 2012	28 November 2016	Democratic Party of Socialists
Rafet Husović	4 December 2012	4 December 2020	Bosniak Party
Azra Jasavić	12 May 2016	28 November 2016	Positive Montenegro
Milorad Vujović	12 May 2016	28 November 2016	Independent
Petar Ivanović	12 May 2016	28 November 2016	Democratic Party of Socialists
Milutin Simović	28 November 2016	4 December 2020	Democratic Party of Socialists
Zoran Pažin	28 November 2016	4 December 2020	Independent
Dritan Abazović	4 December 2020	28 April 2022	United Reform Action
Vladimir Joković	28 April 2022	Incumbent	Socialist People's Party of Montenegro
Raško Konjević	28 April 2022	Incumbent	Social Democratic Party
Jovana Marović	28 April 2022	Incumbent	United Reform Action
Ervin Ibrahimović	28 April 2022	Incumbent	Bosniak Party

== See also ==
- Government of Montenegro
