= Ivan Brajović =

Montenegrin politician

- Иван Брајовић
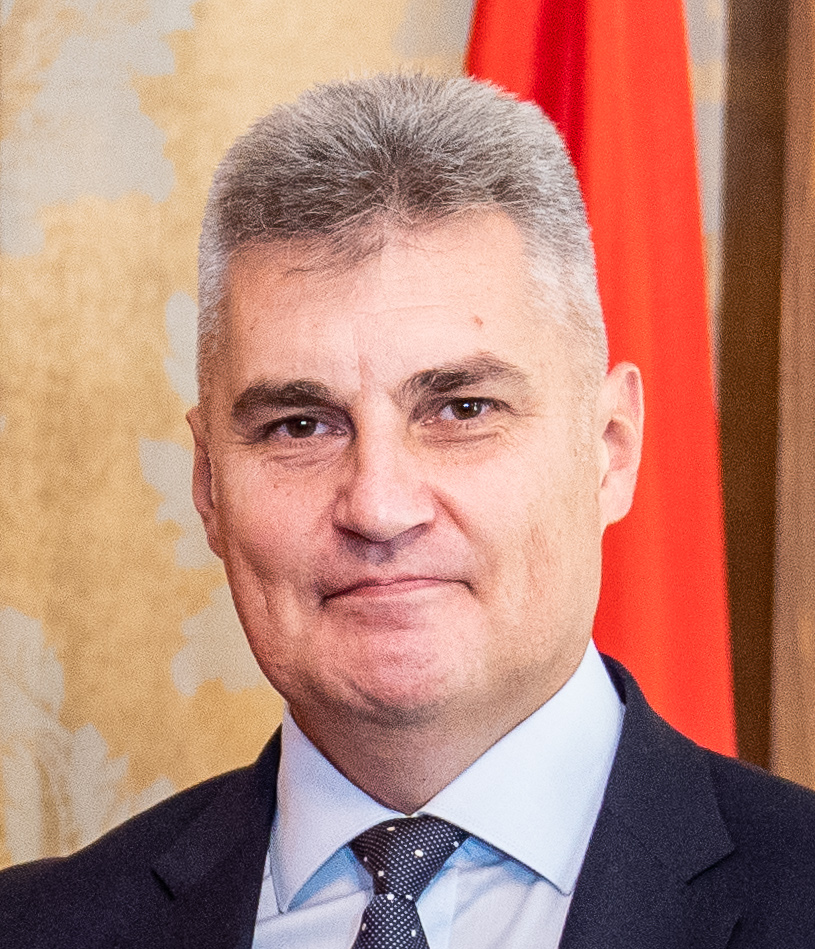
- Brajović in 2018

Member of Parliament
- In office 23 September 2020 – 11 June 2023
- President: Aleksa Bečić

President of the Parliament
- In office 24 November 2016 – 23 September 2020
- Preceded by: Darko Pajović
- Succeeded by: Miodrag Lekić (acting); Aleksa Bečić

Minister of Transport and Maritime Affairs
- In office 4 December 2012 – 28 November 2016
- Prime Minister: Milo Dukanovic
- Preceded by: Andrija Lompar
- Succeeded by: Osman Nurković

Minister of Interior Affairs
- In office 10 June 2009 – 4 December 2012
- Prime Minister: Milo Dukanovic; Igor Luksic
- Preceded by: Jusuf Kalamperović
- Succeeded by: Raško Konjević

Personal details
- Born: 9 March 1962 (age 64) Titograd, PR Montenegro, Yugoslavia
- Party: SD (from 2015)
- Other political affiliations: SDP (1993–2015); SRSJ (1990); SKJ (Before 1990)
- Education: University of Montenegro

Ivan Brajović (Montenegrin Cyrillic: Иван Брајовић; born 9 March 1962) is a Montenegrin politician. He is a former President of the Parliament of Montenegro and former Minister of Transport and Maritime Affairs in the government of Montenegro. He is the founder and current president of the Social Democrats of Montenegro (SD) political party.

== Biography ==
Ivan Brajović, was born in 1962 in Titograd (present-day Podgorica), Montenegrin Capital City, at that time part of the Socialist Republic of Montenegro of SFR Yugoslavia. Having finished elementary and secondary school in Danilovgrad, Brajović graduated at the Faculty of Civil Engineering at the Veljko Vlahović University.

== Political career ==
Until the introduction of the multi-party system, Brajović was a delegate in the Danilovgrad Municipality, member of the Presidency of the League of Socialist Youth of Yugoslavia, Vice-President of the Assembly of the Socialist Republic of Montenegro. With the introduction of multi-party system in 1990 he was one of the founders of the Union of Reform Forces for Montenegro and the Social Democratic Party of Montenegro (SDP). He served as SDP Secretary of the Executive Board and Vice President of the Party.

He was a Minister of Interior Affairs in 5th cabinet of Milo Đukanović (2009-2010) and cabinet of Igor Lukšić (2010–2012), and later Minister of Transport and Maritime Affairs in 6th cabinet of Milo Đukanović (2012–2016).

In 2015 he became one of the founders of the Social Democrats of Montenegro (SD), when the faction of the Social Democratic Party of Montenegro defected from the political party, and formed new political subject, after the split between pro-DPS faction led by Brajović and party leader Ranko Krivokapić. After 2016 parliamentary election, he was elected President of the Parliament.

In the 2020 Montenegrin parliamentary election Brajović won 4.10 of the votes, granting the Social Democrats of Montenegro 3 seats in Parliament.

== See also ==
- Social Democrats of Montenegro
