= Controversy over ethnic and linguistic identity in Montenegro =

There are several points of dispute over the ethnic and linguistic identity of several communities in Montenegro, some of them related to identity of people who self-identify as ethnic Montenegrins, while some other identity issues are also related to communities of Serbs, Croats, Bosniaks and ethnic Muslims. All of those issues are mutually interconnected and highly politicized.

The central issue is whether self-identified Montenegrins constitute a distinct ethnic group or a subgroup of some other nation, as often claimed by self-identified Serbs. This divide has its historical roots in the first decades of the 20th century, during which the pivotal political issue was the dilemma between retaining national sovereignty of Montenegro, advocated by supporters of the Petrović-Njegoš dynasty, most notably Greens, i.e. members of the True People's Party, and supporters of integration with the Kingdom of Serbia, and consequently with other South Slavic peoples under the Karađorđević dynasty, advocated by the Whites (gathered around the People's Party). This dispute renewed during the dissolution of Yugoslavia and subsequent secession of Montenegro from the state union with Serbia after the 2006 Montenegrin independence referendum. According to the 2023 census data, 41.1% of people in Montenegro identify as ethnic Montenegrins (decrease of 3.8% from 2011), while 32.9% declare as ethnic Serbs (increase of 4.2% from 2011); 43.2% said they spoke "Serbian" whereas 34.5% declared "Montenegrin" as their native language.

== History ==
Metropolitan Danilo I (r. 1696–1735) called himself "Duke of the Serb land". Metropolitan Sava Petrović called his people, the Montenegrins, the "Serbian nation" (1766). Petar I Petrović-Njegoš (r. 1784–1830) was the conceiver of a plan to form a new Slavo-Serbian Empire by joining Bay of Kotor, Dubrovnik, Dalmatia, Herzegovina to Montenegro and some of the highland neighbours (1807), he also wrote "The Russian Czar would be recognized as the Tsar of the Serbs and the Metropolitan of Montenegro would be his assistant. The leading role in the restoration of the Serbian Empire belongs to Montenegro."

In the late 19th century Montenegro's aspirations mirrored that of Serbia — unification and independence of Serb-inhabited lands. Njegoš (r. 1830–1851), regarded the greatest Montenegrin poet, was a leading Serb figure and instrumental in codifying the Kosovo Myth as the central theme of the Serbian national movement. The Petrović-Njegoš dynasty tried to take the role as the Serb leader and unifier, but Montenegro's small size and weak economy led to the recognition of the primacy of the Karađorđević dynasty (in Serbia) in this respect. Although Montenegrins espoused a Serb identity, they were also proud of their state, especially in the Cetinje area, the capital of the Kingdom of Montenegro. The sense of distinct statehood bred an autonomist sentiment in part of the Montenegrin population following the unification with Serbia (and dissolution of Montenegro) in 1918.

During the First World War, a controversy over ethnic identity of Montenegrins was sparked by lawyer Ivo Pilar who claimed that during the early medieval times, territory of modern-day Montenegro belonged to Red Croatia, developing from that a theory of Croatian ethnic origin of Montenegrins. After the war, that theory was accepted and developed by Savić Marković Štedimlija, who claimed that Montenegrins were in fact a branch of Croatian people.

It has been argued by some that there was no separate Montenegrin nation before 1945; they claim that the language, history, religion and culture of Montenegro were considered unquestionably Serbian. Josef Korbel stated, in 1951, that "The Montenegrins proudly called themselves Serbs, and even today it would be difficult to find people of the older generations who would say they are Montenegrin. Only young Communists accept and propagate the theory of a Montenegrin nation."

The Anti-Fascist Council for the National Liberation of Yugoslavia (AVNOJ, 1942–45) recognized five constituent peoples of Yugoslavia: Serbs, Croats, Slovenes, Macedonians and Montenegrins.

Until the 1990s, most of the Montenegrins defined themselves as both Serbs and Montenegrins. The vast majority of Montenegrins declared themselves as Montenegrins in the 1971–1991 censuses because they were citizens of the Socialist Republic of Montenegro. The 1992 Montenegrin independence referendum, which Montenegrin separatists boycotted, saw 96% in favour of Montenegro remaining a part of rump Yugoslavia (FR Yugoslavia – Serbia and Montenegro). Until 1996, a 'pro-Serbian consensus predominated in Montenegrin politics'.

As Montenegro began to seek independence from Serbia with the Đukanović–Milošević split after the Yugoslav Wars, the Montenegrin nationalist movement emphasized the difference between the Montenegrin and Serbian identities and that the term "Montenegrin" never implied belonging to the wider Serb identity. The people had to make a choice whether they supported Montenegrin independence – the choosing of identity seems to have been based on their stance on independence. Now, those who supported independence redefined the Montenegrin identity as a separate identity (unlike the previous overlapping Montenegrin/Serbian identity espoused by the later rulers from the Montenegrin Petrović-Njegoš dynasty), while those who supported federation with Serbia increasingly insisted on their Serb identity.

According to historian Srdja Pavlović, the Montenegrins preserved the sense of their political and cultural distinctiveness with regard to the other South Slavic groups and continuously reaffirmed it through history. According to Pavlović, the notion of Serbdom was understood by Montenegrins to be their belonging to the Eastern Orthodox faith and to Christianity in general, as well as the larger South Slavic context. They incorporated this idea in the building blocks of their national individuality. Because it was understood as the ideology of a constant struggle, this Montenegrin Serbdom did not stand in opposition to a distinct character of Montenegrin national identity. Rather it was used as a tool of pragmatic politics in order to achieve the final goal. Montenegrins used the terms Serbs and Serbdom whenever they referred to South Slavic elements rallied in an anti-Ottoman coalition and around Christian Cross. Whenever they referred to particular elements of their social structure and their political system, they used the term Montenegrin.

The pro-Yugoslav (unionist) side, headed by Momir Bulatović, stressed that Serbians and Montenegrins shared the same ethnicity (as Serbs) and evoked 'the unbreakable unity of Serbia and Montenegro, of one people and one flesh and blood'. Bulatović promoted an exclusive Serb identity for the majority Orthodox population.

=== Historical revisionism ===
There is an ongoing historical revisionism in Montenegro, where Montenegrin identity is promoted with the "Duklja (Doclean) narrative" as founding myth.

== Nationalism in Montenegro ==
There are generally two variants of nationalism in Montenegro, pro-Montenegrin and pro-Serb. Pro-Montenegrin nationalism seeks and defends an independent Montenegro, such as exists in the present. Pro-Serb nationalism typically seeks a union with Serbia, such as the Federal Republic of Yugoslavia. Pro-Montenegrin nationalism focuses on the difference in culture, ethnicity, and language as a means to justify the need for an independent Montenegrin state. On the other hand, pro-Serb nationalism focuses on the similarities between Montenegrins and Serbians as a means to justify unification of the two states.

== History of ethnic and linguistic identification ==
Year	Total	Serbian or Serbo-Croatian language	%	Area	Note
1909	317,856		~95%	Principality of Montenegro	According exclusively to language.
1921	199,227	181,989	91.3%	Andrijevica, Bar, Kolašin, Nikšić, Podgorica, and Cetinje counties of the Kingdom of Yugoslavia (categorized in official statistics as Montenegro)	According to language (Serbo-Croatian)

Year	Total	Serbs	%	Montenegrins	%	Area	Note
1948	377,189	6,707	1.8	342,009	90.6	People's Republic of Montenegro (part of FPR Yugoslavia)	First census in Yugoslavia
1953	419,873	13,864	3.3	363,686	86.6	People's Republic of Montenegro (part of FPR Yugoslavia)	
1961	471,894	14,087	3	383,988	81.3	People's Republic of Montenegro (part of FPR Yugoslavia)	
1971	529,604	39,512	7.4	355,632	67.1	Socialist Republic of Montenegro (part of SFR Yugoslavia)	
1981	584,310	19,407	3.3	400,488	68.5	Socialist Republic of Montenegro (part of SFR Yugoslavia)	
1991	615,035	54,453	9.3	380,467	61.8	Socialist Republic of Montenegro (part of SFR Yugoslavia)	Last census in Yugoslavia
2003	620,145	198,414	32	267,669	43.1	Republic of Montenegro (part of Serbia and Montenegro)	First census after the breakup of Yugoslavia.
2011	620,029	178,110	28.7	278,865	45	Independent Montenegro	First census in independent state.
2023	623,633	205,370	32.9	256,436	41.1	Independent Montenegro	

== Gallery ==
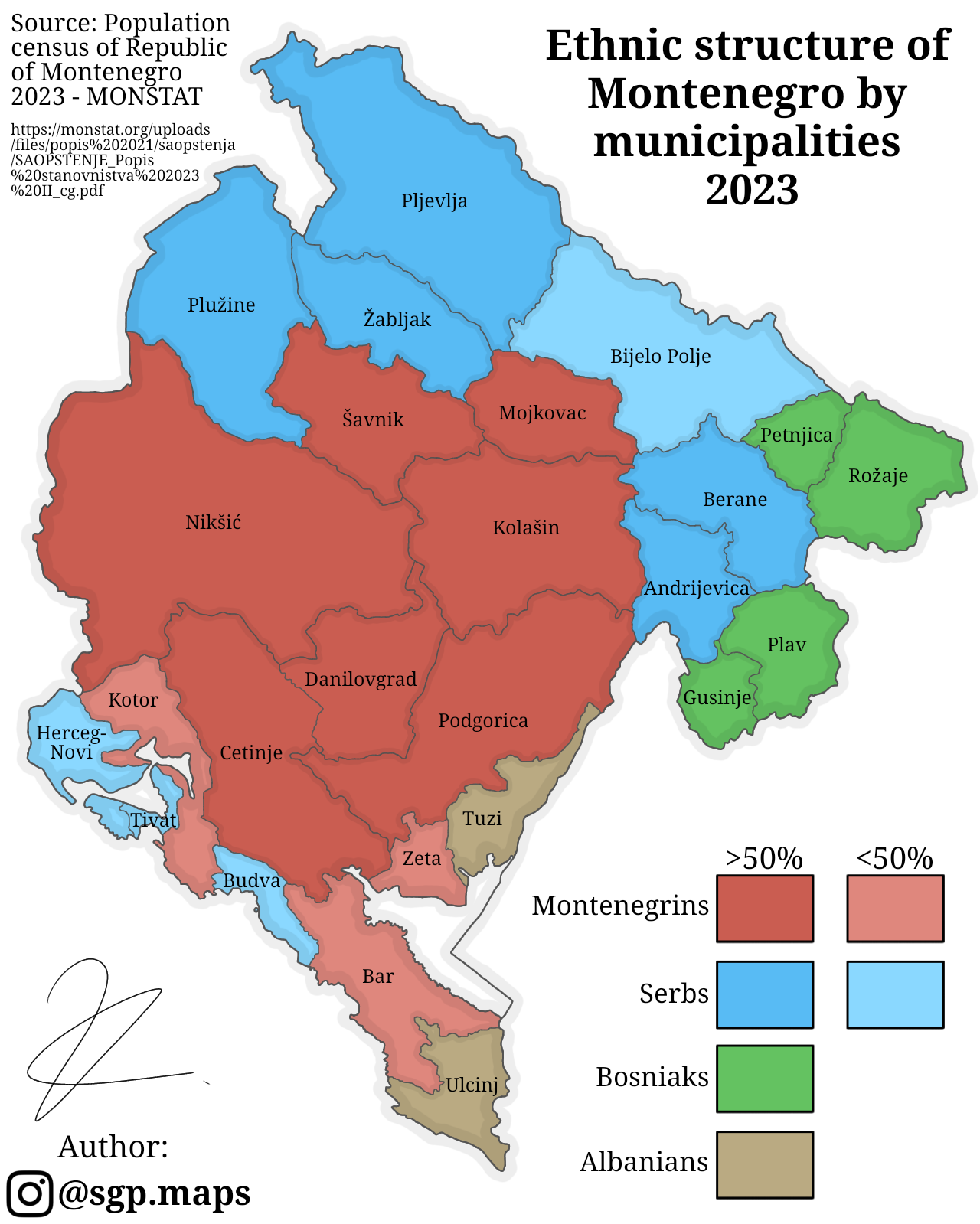
Ethnic structure by municipalities
(2023 census)

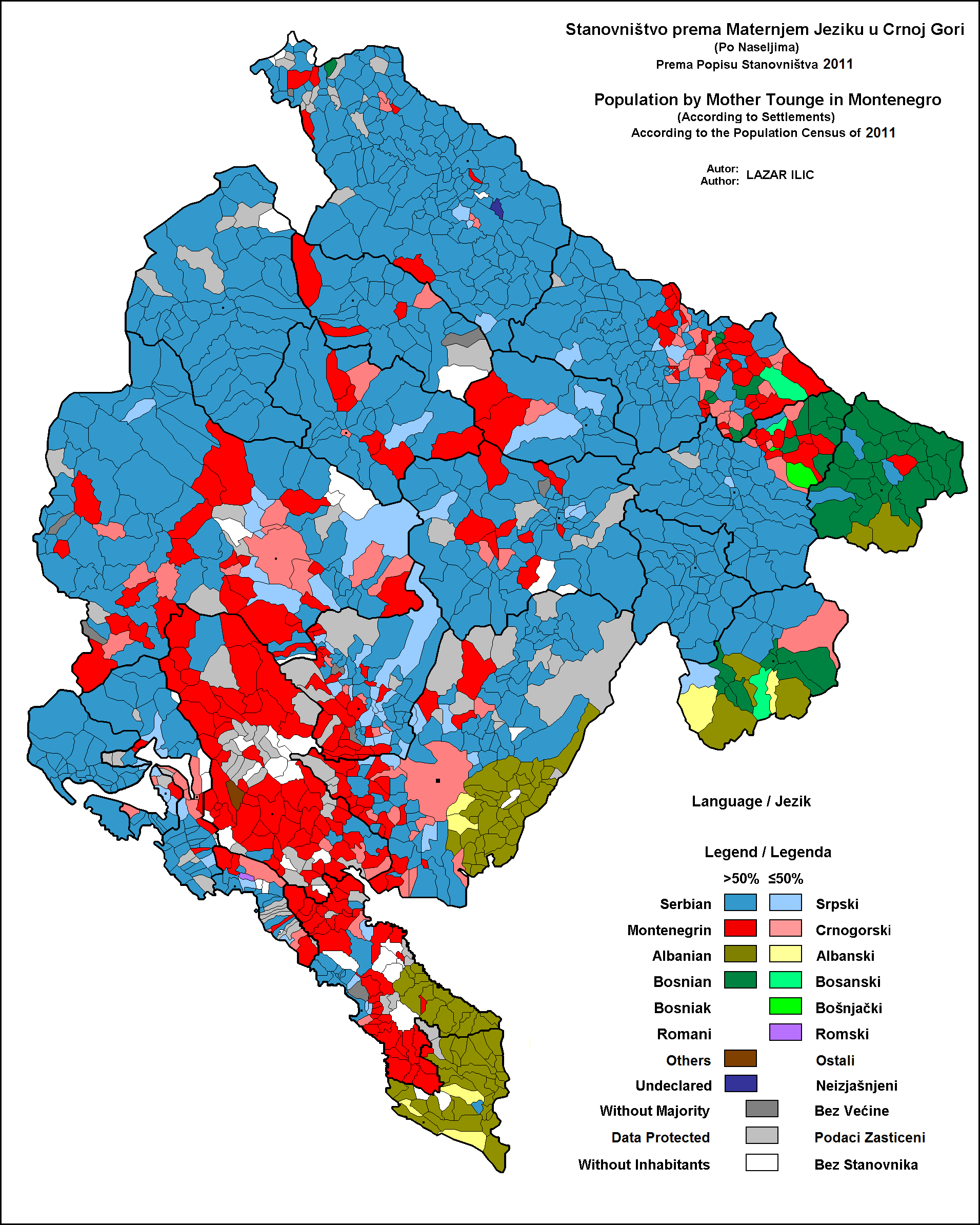
Linguistic structure by settlements
(2011 census)

Linguistic structure by municipalities
(2011 census)

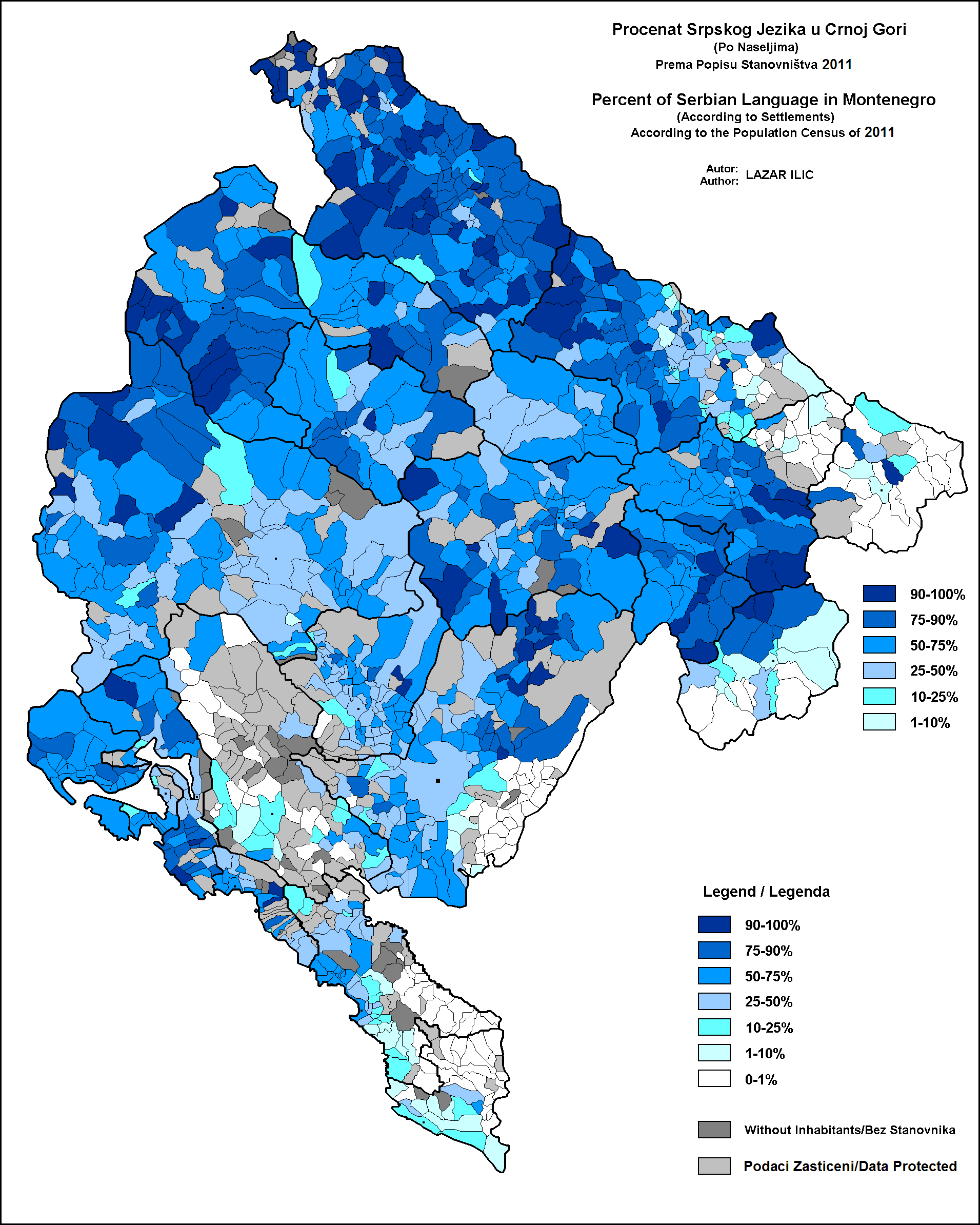
Serbian language by settlements
(2011 census)

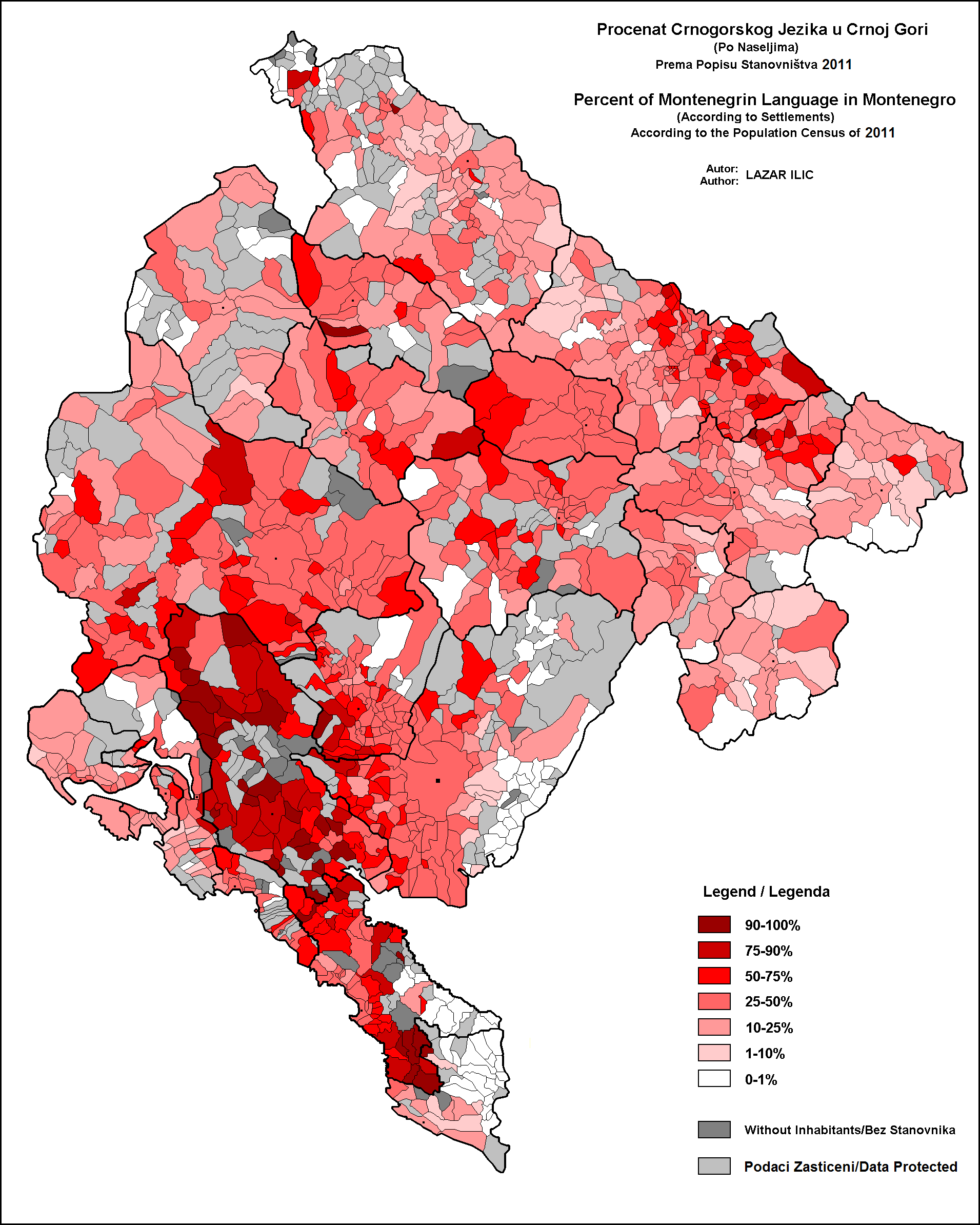
Montenegrin language by settlements
(2011 census)

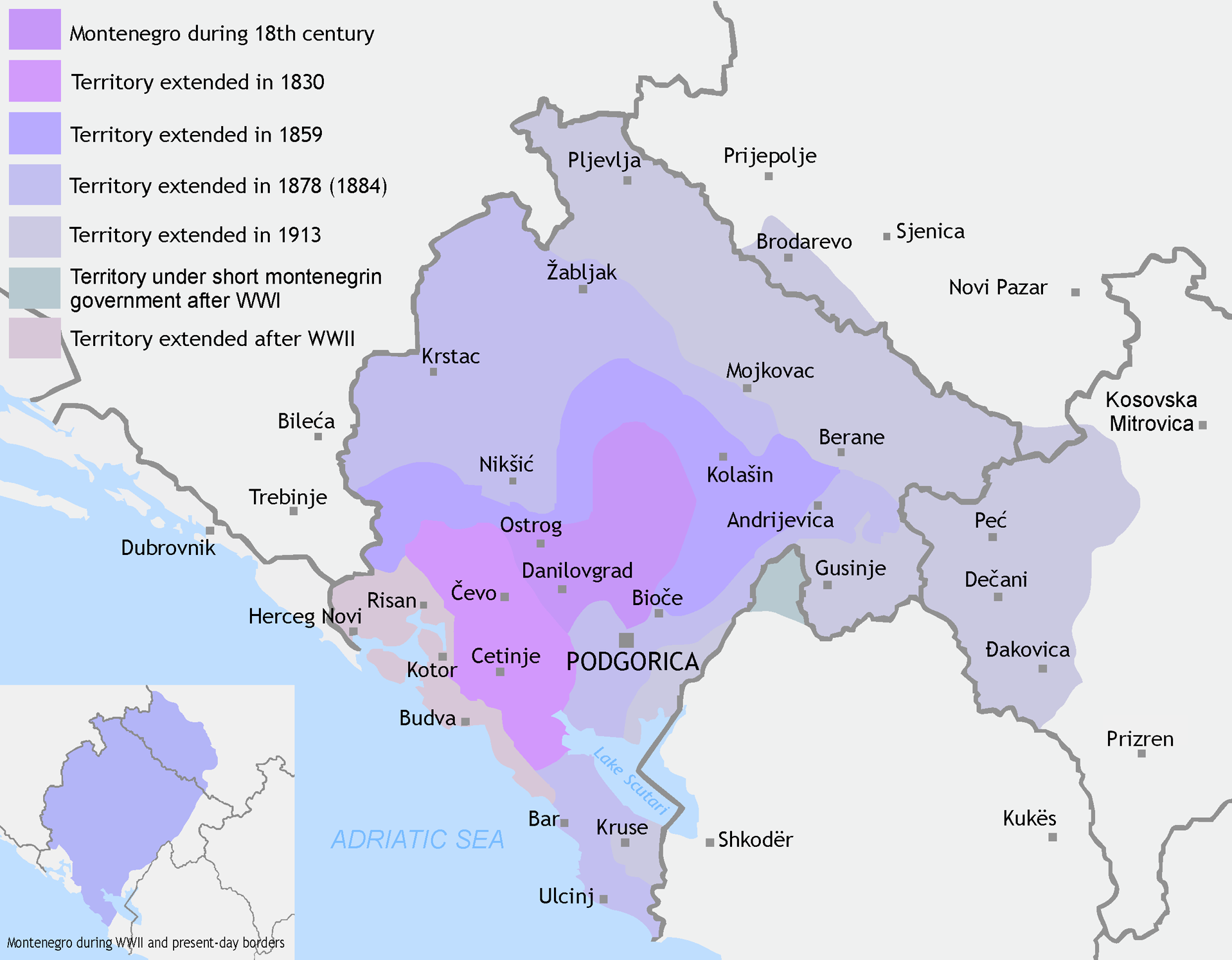
Expansion of Montenegro: the region of Old Montenegro represented in the darkest shade (18th century)

Results of the 2006 Montenegrin independence referendum by municipalities

== See also ==
- Serbian–Montenegrin unionism
- Yugoslavism
- Old Montenegro
- Controversy over ethnic and linguistic identity in Moldova

== Sources ==
- Bideleux, Robert; Jeffries, Ian (2007). "Montenegro: To be or not to be?". The Balkans: A Post-Communist History. Routledge. pp. 471–511. ISBN 978-1-134-58328-7.
- Džomić, Velibor V. (2006). Pravoslavlje u Crnoj Gori [Orthodoxy in Montenegro]. Svetigora. ISBN 9788676600311.
- Huszka, Beata (2013). "The Montenegrin independence movement". Secessionist Movements and Ethnic Conflict: Debate-Framing and Rhetoric in Independence Campaigns. Routledge. pp. 104–132. ISBN 978-1-134-68784-8.
- Lazarević, Dragana (2014). "The Montenegrin Case – Finding a Foundation Myth". Istorija i geografija: susreti i prožimanja [History and geography: meetings and permeations]. Belgrade. pp. 428–443. ISBN 978-86-7005-125-6.
- Pavlowitch, Stevan K. (1999). A history of the Balkans, 1804-1945. Longman. ISBN 978-0-582-04585-9.
- Trbovich, Ana S. (2008). A Legal Geography of Yugoslavia's Disintegration. Oxford University Press. ISBN 978-0-19-533343-5.
- Pavlovic, Srdja (2008). Balkan Anschluss: The Annexation of Montenegro and the Creation of the Common South Slavic State. Purdue University Press. ISBN 9781557534651.
