= Vujica Lazović =

Montenegrin politician

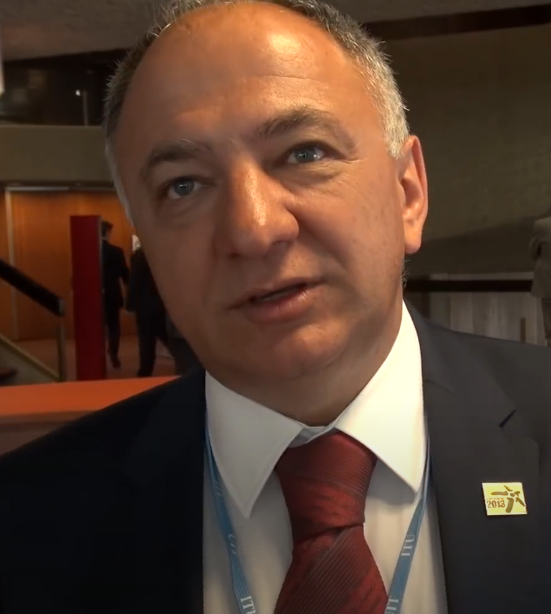
Vujica Lazović in 2013

Vujica Lazović (Montenegrin Cyrillic: Вујица Лазовић; born 10 March 1963 in Plav, Montenegro, SFRY) is a Montenegrin politician, professor and diplomat who is currently serving as ambassador of Montenegro to Slovenia. He was vice-president of the Social Democratic Party (SDP) under Ranko Krivokapić, and was one of founding members of the new Social Democrats of Montenegro (SD), in 2016. He is currently president of the Political Council of the Social Democrats.

== Education ==
Lazović graduated from University of Montenegro Faculty of Economics in 1986, and defended his master's degree at the University of Belgrade in 1994. In 1997, Lazović received his doctorate at the University of Montenegro. He has been employed at the University of Montenegro since 1988, from 1998 to 2000, he was the Vice Dean for Teaching at the Faculty of Economics, and from 2001 until 2006, he was the Dean of the Faculty.

== Politics ==
Between 1989 and 1993, Lazović was a member of the Parliament of Montenegro, first as a member of the League of Communists, and later as a member of the Union of Reform Forces. He was one of the founders of the Social Democratic Party (SDP) in 1993 and long-term vice-president of the Party. he was the Deputy Prime Minister of Montenegro (2006-2016) and the Minister of Economy (2006-2010), in several governments during the rule of the Democratic Party of Socialists (DPS) of Milo Đukanović regime in Montenegro, between May 2006 and September 2016, when he was appointed ambassador of Montenegro to Slovenia. In 2015 he became one of the founders of the Social Democrats of Montenegro (SD), when the faction of the Social Democratic Party defected from the political party, and formed new political subject, after the split between pro-DPS faction led by two vice-presidents Lazović and Ivan Brajović and party leader Ranko Krivokapić.
