= Boro Vučinić =

Boro Vučinić Боро Вучинић
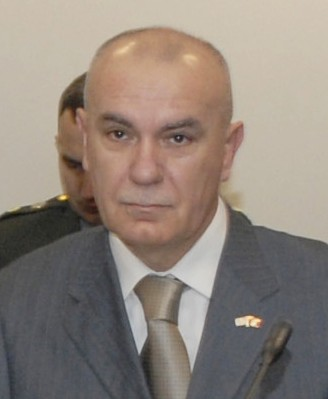
- Boro Vučinić at The Pentagon in 2007

Head of the National Security Agency
- In office 1 March 2012 – 12 March 2015
- Prime Minister: Igor Lukšić
- Preceded by: Vladan Joković
- Succeeded by: Dejan Peruničić

Minister of Defence
- In office 10 November 2006 – 1 March 2012
- Prime Minister: Milo Đukanović
- Preceded by: Milo Đukanović
- Succeeded by: Milica Pejanović-Đurišić

Personal details
- Born: 1954 (age 71–72) Titograd, SR Montenegro, Yugoslavia
- Party: Democratic Party of Socialists
- Education: University of Montenegro
- Occupation: Lawyer

Boro Vučinić (Montenegrin Cyrillic: Боро Вучинић; born 1954 in Titograd) is the former head of the Montenegrin National Security Agency, as well as the former Minister of Defense and the former Minister of Urban Planning of Montenegro.

As Minister of Urban Planning Vučinić was involved the sale of an old ship repair yard on the Adriatic Sea, the first major privatization deal of Montenegro since the independence from Serbia.

He has a master's degree and is married with four children.
