= Dragan Đurović =

Montenegrin politician (1959–2024)

Dragan Đurović (Serbian Cyrillic: Драган Ђуровић; 31 October 1959 – 27 June 2024) was a Montenegrin politician, Deputy Prime Minister between 2001 and 2007, and within that period he was also the Minister of the Interior (in the period between 2003 and 2005) and Acting Minister of Foreign Affairs (in the period between May 2002 and January 2003). He chaired sessions of the Government of Montenegro in the period between 5 November and 8 January 2003.

== Biography ==
Đurović was born on 31 October 1959. He graduated from the Faculty of Law.

In the 1980s he was actively promoting democratic ideas. During the one-party system of that time, a smaller group of persons from the Youth Organisation of Montenegro published the document named "Let's stop the election frauds", which was actually the request for introduction of the multi-party system. The document, which caused the impulsive reaction of the community leaders of Montenegro of that time, was publicly promoted at Skaline, i.e. mouth of the river located in Podgorica where the Ribnica river flows into the Moraca river. One can say that it was the first dissident movement in newer political history of Montenegro.

Among other positions, he was the director of newspaper and publishing company Pobjeda (1995–2001), the appointed deputy of the House of Citizens of the Parliament of Serbia and Montenegro two times, and deputy of the Parliament of the Republic of Montenegro five times.

He was also the head of deputy club of Democratic Party of Socialists of Montenegro in Montenegrin Parliament and member of the party's Presidency.

From 2009 he held the position of the director of Civil Aviation Agency of Montenegro. He was also member of Coordinating Committee of European Civil Aviation Conference (ECAC).

Đurović died on 27 June 2024, at the age of 64.

== Note ==
There is another Montenegrin politician of name Dragan Đurović who was the assistant minister of foreign affairs for Serbia and Montenegro as of December 2003.
