= Miroslav Ivanišević =

Montenegrin politician

Miroslav Ivanišević (born 1956 in Cetinje) is a Montenegrin politician. He was appointed the Montenegrin Minister of Finance in July 1998, and served until February 2004. He has a degree from economics.

In 2007 he was accused of being involved in cigarette smuggling into Italy, but was found not guilty in 2010.

Political offices
Preceded by Predrag Goranović	Minister of Finance; 1998–2004	Succeeded by Igor Lukšić
