= Milo Đukanović =

President of Montenegro (1998–2002, 2018–2023)

- Мило Ђукановић
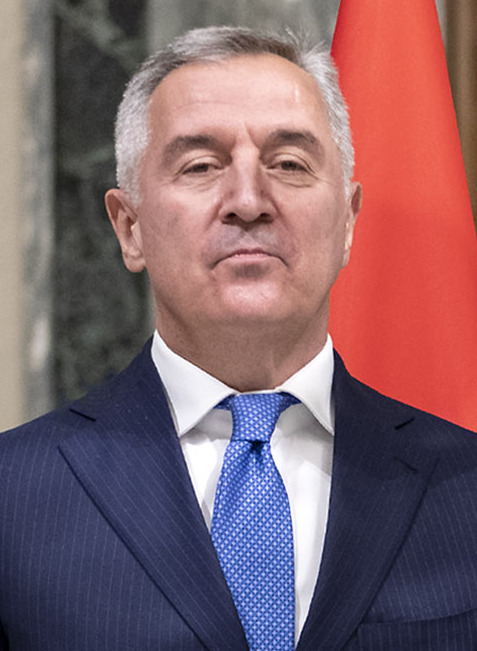
- Đukanović in 2022

2nd President of Montenegro
- In office 20 May 2018 – 20 May 2023
- Prime Minister: Duško Marković; Zdravko Krivokapić; Dritan Abazović
- Preceded by: Filip Vujanović
- Succeeded by: Jakov Milatović

2nd President of Montenegro within FR Yugoslavia
- In office 15 January 1998 – 25 November 2002
- Prime Minister: Filip Vujanović
- President of FR Yugoslavia: Slobodan Milošević; Vojislav Koštunica
- Preceded by: Momir Bulatović
- Succeeded by: Filip Vujanović

Prime Minister of Montenegro
- In office 4 December 2012 – 28 November 2016
- President: Filip Vujanović
- Preceded by: Igor Lukšić
- Succeeded by: Duško Marković
- In office 29 February 2008 – 29 December 2010
- President: Filip Vujanović
- Preceded by: Željko Šturanović
- Succeeded by: Igor Lukšić
- In office 8 January 2003 – 10 November 2006
- President: Filip Vujanović; Dragan Kujović; Filip Vujanović
- Preceded by: Dragan Đurović (acting)
- Succeeded by: Željko Šturanović
- In office 15 February 1991 – 5 February 1998
- President: Momir Bulatović
- Preceded by: Position established
- Succeeded by: Filip Vujanović

Minister of Defence
- In office 5 June 2006 – 10 November 2006
- Prime Minister: Himself
- Preceded by: Position established
- Succeeded by: Boro Vučinić

President of the DPS
- In office 31 October 1998 – 6 April 2023
- Preceded by: Milica Pejanović-Đurišić
- Succeeded by: Danijel Živković

Personal details
- Born: 15 February 1962 (age 64) Nikšić, PR Montenegro, FPR Yugoslavia
- Party: Independent (since 2023)
- Other political affiliations: DPS (1991–2023); ECG (1998–2016); SKJ (1979–1991)
- Height: 198 cm (6 ft 6 in)
- Spouse: Lidija Kuč
- Children: 1
- Relatives: Aco Đukanović (brother)
- Education: Veljko Vlahović University

Milo Đukanović (Montenegrin Cyrillic: Мило Ђукановић, pronounced [mǐːlo dʑǔkanoʋitɕ]; born 15 February 1962) is a Montenegrin politician who served as the president of Montenegro from 1998 to 2002 and from 2018 to 2023. He also served as the Prime Minister of Montenegro (1991–1998, 2003–2006, 2008–2010 and 2012–2016) and was the long-term president of the Democratic Party of Socialists of Montenegro, originally the Montenegrin branch of the League of Communists of Yugoslavia, which governed Montenegro alone or in a coalition from the introduction of multi-party politics in the early 1990s until its defeat in the 2020 parliamentary election. He is the longest-ruling contemporary politician in Europe, having held key positions in the country for over 33 years. However, he was defeated by the 36-year-old centrist former economy minister, Jakov Milatović, after the presidential run-off held on 2 April 2023.

When Đukanović first emerged on the political scene, he was a close ally of Slobodan Milošević during the anti-bureaucratic revolution (1988–1989) and the dissolution of SFR Yugoslavia (1991–1992). His cabinet actively participated in the siege of Dubrovnik (1991–1992). Đukanović supported Momir Bulatović's agreement on Lord Carrington's terms, which resulted in the 1992 Montenegrin independence referendum, where voters decided to remain in FR Yugoslavia. In 1996, however, Đukanović distanced himself from Milošević and the federal government, abandoning the traditional joint Serbian and Montenegrin vision in favour of Montenegrin nationalism, which supported state independence and a separate Montenegrin identity. That led to the division of the party and the split of Bulatović's pro-unionist faction. Shortly afterward, Đukanović defeated Bulatović in the 1997 presidential election by a thin margin. In 1999, he negotiated with Western countries in an attempt to limit airstrikes in Montenegro during the NATO bombing of Yugoslavia, while later Đukanović oversaw the implementation of the Deutsche Mark as the new currency in Montenegro, replacing the Yugoslav dinar.

Following the overthrow of Milošević (2000), he signed an agreement with the new Serbian government that led to the Constitutional Charter of Serbia and Montenegro (2003), which allowed for Montenegrin independence. Three years later, the 2006 independence referendum led to a formal separation from the state union and the proclamation of the new Constitution of Montenegro (2007). Đukanović has pursued a NATO and EU accession policy, resulting in Montenegro's NATO membership in 2017. Over the course of his premiership and presidency, he oversaw the privatization of public companies to foreign investors and firms. Several corruption scandals of the ruling party triggered 2019 anti-government protests, while a controversial religion law sparked another wave of protests. For the first time in three decades, in the 2020 parliamentary election, the opposition won more votes than Đukanović's ruling party and its partners.

Several domestic and foreign observers have described Đukanović's rule as either authoritarian, autocratic, or kleptocratic, with some international organizations and research institutions, such as Freedom House, Economist Intelligence Unit, and V-Dem Institute, warning that Montenegro has experienced democratic backsliding under his government. His brother Aco Đukanović, the owner of Montenegro's first private bank, had the upper hand in the privatization process that took place in the country after the fall of communism. Additionally, his sister, the lawyer Ana Kolarevic, controlled the judiciary for a long time. DPS clientelist networks dominated all segments of social life, making party membership necessary to start a business or obtain a position in the administration. In 2020, Freedom House classified Montenegro as a hybrid regime rather than a democracy, mentioning the years of increasing state capture, abuse of power, and strongman tactics employed by Đukanović. He is often described as having strong links to the Montenegrin mafia. Đukanović was listed among the twenty richest world leaders according to the British newspaper The Independent in May 2010, which described the source of his estimated £10 million wealth as "mysterious". In October 2021, Đukanović and his son Blažo were mentioned in the Pandora Papers, linking them to two trusts on the British Virgin Islands.

== Early life ==
Đukanović was born in Nikšić on 15 February 1962, to Radovan and Stana Đukanović (née Maksimović). His given name is derived from that of a paternal relative who had fought alongside Đukanović's grandfather, Blažo, during World War I; the name was selected by Đukanović's paternal grandmother. Đukanović's paternal ancestors, members of the Ozrinići tribe who hailed from the village of Čevo, had settled in the Nikšić area following the Battle of Vučji Do in 1876. Prior to the birth of Đukanović's older sister Ana in 1960, Đukanović's father had worked as a judge in Bosnia and Herzegovina before relocating to Nikšić with his family and taking up residence in the Đukanović family's ancestral village, Rastovac. Đukanović's mother was a nurse. His younger brother Aleksandar Đukanović (Aco) was born in 1965. Đukanović completed his primary and secondary education in Nikšić before relocating to Titograd to attend Veljko Vlahović University's Faculty of Economics. He graduated in 1986 with a diploma in tourism studies. Đukanović was an avid basketball player in his youth.

== Political career ==
=== Early activism ===
In 1979, while still in high school, Đukanović joined the Yugoslav Communist League (SKJ), the only officially allowed political party in communist Yugoslavia's one-party political system. His father, Radovan, was already an influential member within the party's Montenegrin branch, which initially opened many doors for him. By 1986, he was a member of the presidency of the League of Socialist Youth of Yugoslavia, Montenegrin branch, as well as a member of the presidency of its federal-level parent organization.

As a member of the party's various youth bodies, he quickly stood out from the pack, earning a nickname, Britva ('Straight razor'), for his direct and forceful rhetoric. Progressing steadily up the party ladder, by 1988 Đukanović became a member of the League's highest decision-making body, the Central Committee of the 13th Congress of the League of Communists of Yugoslavia (CK SKJ). Eventually, it turned out that this was the committee's last sitting, with Đukanović becoming its youngest member ever.

Within days in January 1989, the trio ousted Miljan Radović, the chairman of the Montenegrin Communist League, and Božina Ivanović, the Presidents of the Presidency of Montenegro, replacing them with politically obedient confidants Veselin Vukotić and Branko Kostić, respectively. President of the Executive Council Vuko Vukadinović initially survived the coup d'état; however, within several months he was on his way out as well, to be replaced by Radoje Kontić. Consequently, Đukanović and the others galvanized public opinion within the republic by organizing workers and busing them to the capital, Titograd (later renamed to Podgorica), to protest in front of the country's National Assembly.

=== First three terms as Prime Minister of Montenegro (1991–1998) ===
The 1990 Montenegrin parliamentary election in early December resulted in a remarkable victory for the League of Communists of Montenegro, which won 83 parliamentary seats out of the total 125. On 15 February 1991, Đukanović was, somewhat surprisingly, appointed Prime Minister of the first democratically elected government by President Momir Bulatović and with the blessing of Serbian President Slobodan Milošević.

Later in 1991, the Montenegrin Communist League finished its transformation into the Democratic Party of Socialists of Montenegro (DPS). Đukanović's office was secured after the 1992 parliamentary election. Held in December, they were called early due to the disintegration of the Socialist Federal Republic of Yugoslavia and the formation of a new state entity, the Federal Republic of Yugoslavia. In the elections, the DPS won an absolute majority, 46 seats out of the total 85.

Đukanović's government sent troops to fight seceding Croatia, as he opposed the fallout of Yugoslavia caused by Slovenia's declaration of independence and the subsequent Ten-Day War (Slovenian War of Independence), as well as armed rebellions and full-scale wars in other areas of the country, including several Croatian regions (Slavonija and Krajina), large swaths of Bosnia, and the majority of Kosovo. Đukanović's cabinet actively participated in the siege of Dubrovnik from the autumn of 1991 until spring 1992, which resulted in the city suffering heavy structural damage. The surrounding area of Konavle also suffered due to looting raids. During this period, Đukanović was one of the most vociferous hawks in the Montenegrin government. Some of his notable statements from this period include a proclamation about "starting to hate chess because of the šahovnica (the chequerboard Croatian coat-of-arms)."

Đukanović campaigned for the modification of the internal borders of the ex-Yugoslav republics saying: "it's time to once and for all establish the firmest border possible with Croatia, but it will be a border a lot more just and realistic than the existing one that was drawn-up by Bolshevik map makers."

On the domestic political front in 1992, Đukanović became involved in a fierce political clash with Montenegrin artist and antiwar activist Jevrem Brković, which resulted in Brković's exile to Croatia, which lasted until 1998. On this occasion, Đukanović stated: "Every smart Montenegrin and every honest man in this land mentions the name of the traitor Jevrem Brković with hatred, who in pure vanity betrayed his people and knowingly spreads anti-Yugoslav speeches across Zagreb, while the Ustašas, again like in 1941, bleed the defenseless Serbian civilians."

==== Carrington's proposal and crises in 1992 ====
The siege of Dubrovnik had enormous consequences for Yugoslavia's international standing. The European Economic Community invited Lord Carrington and representatives from Yugoslavia to negotiate the Carrington plan on 19 October 1991, in The Hague. Milošević rejected the proposal of a "loose federation of independent states", and preferred a centralized Yugoslavia with institutional powers in Belgrade. However, in open defiance to Milošević, Đukanović supported Momir Bulatović's agreement on Carrington's terms. Yet in a sharp turn, the Narodna Stranka (People's Party) called for an emergency session in the Montenegrin parliament, during which Bulatović was accused of treason. Đukanović defended Bulatović in the parliamentary hearing. As Bulatović's deputy, Đukanović was invited to negotiations with Milošević and Borisav Jović, after which a clause was added to the Carrington proposal such that a republic could decide to stay in Yugoslavia through a referendum. This resulted in the referendum on 1 March 1992, where voters in Montenegro decided to remain in Yugoslavia.

On 6 August 1992, a local warlord named Milika "Čeko" Dačević occupied police headquarters in Pljevlja after a vehicle used by his personal envoy was seized. In what quickly developed into an emergency, over half of the city's police surrendered to Dačević. As a result, Đukanović and Bulatović participated in negotiations with Dobrica Ćosić and Života Panić. One of Dačević's accomplices from Čajniče, Duško Kornjača, threatened to kill all of the Muslims in Pljevlja unless Dačević was released. During the meeting, Đukanović asked whether Montenegro could rely on the Army of Yugoslavia to protect the Muslims in Pljevlja. Đukanović and Bulatović ultimately negotiated the disarmament of Dačević's men. However, Pljevlja's Muslims were subject to multiple incidents up to 1995, particularly in the village of Bukovica where 6 Muslim inhabitants were killed from 1992.

==== Split from Yugoslav leadership ====
In November 1995, Đukanović and Svetozar Marović visited the Pentagon at the invitation of the United States, where they allegedly offered the Port of Bar as a logistics venue for international peacekeeping in Bosnia and Herzegovina. The meeting at the Pentagon was criticized by Yugoslavia's ruling parties at the time. The vice-chairman of the Serbian Radical Party, Milinko Gazdić, claimed that his party had proof that Đukanović and Marović were appealing to the United States for Montenegro's eventual secession from Yugoslavia. This did not deter Đukanović from visiting Bill Clinton during his re-election campaign for the 1996 presidential elections in the United States. Some of Đukanović's critics claimed that he discussed donating to Clinton's campaign that year.

Đukanović's communication with Milošević began to deteriorate after a disagreement on how to address the hyperinflation of the Yugoslav dinar in 1993. He then expressed opposition to the Dayton Agreement, which he criticized as being anti-Serb. In what was his most open criticism to date, he publicly blasted Milošević in an interview with the Belgrade weekly Vreme, calling him "a man of obsolete political ideas".

As a war of words erupted with Milošević and his wife Mira, Đukanović wrote a letter of support to the students demonstrating in the 1996–97 protests in Serbia. In a stark contrast, Momir Bulatović refused to attack Milošević. This set the stage for the split between Đukanović and Bulatović, whose partnership had stood remarkably strong up to that point. In spite of the initial disconnect in the DPS leadership, the party overwhelmingly won the 1996 parliamentary election.

Đukanović campaign poster showing a picture with Bill Clinton for the 1997 presidential election. The slogan exclaims: Get involved! Vote for Milo!

On 10 March 1997, after a trip to Washington, D.C. for Montenegro's Trade Mission by the initiative of Ratko Knežević, The Washington Times published a letter allegedly written by Đukanović to congressmen Nick Rahall and Bruce Vento. Congressmen Rahall and Vento had traveled to Belgrade during the student protests, even appearing in a Zajedno opposition meeting. A week after The Washington Times publication, Politika ran the letter on its front page on 18 March, adding the title: "Milo Đukanović continues endeavoring to break up FR Yugoslavia and Serbia." Even though the letter did not actually mention Montenegrin secession, Đukanović denied writing the letter and said it was a forgery.

Another development which further distanced Đukanović from Milošević and Bulatović was his friendship with Vukašin Maraš, with whom he worked in the Automotive Association of Yugoslavia as a secondary job. On 28 July 1994, customs inspector Pavle Zelić informed the Federal Assembly of Yugoslavia that approximately 4–5 million DM was found in boxes in AMSJ's office, and that he was not given a chance to count the money. In 1997, DT Magazin published a story reporting that the money was a part of a laundering operation involving the importing of cigarettes, whisky, oil, and other scarce goods during the sanctions against Yugoslavia, although most of the report could not be proven with the exception of the fact that the customs had been terminated after an agreement with Montenegrin customs chief Radosav Sekulić, Maraš, Đukanović, and Ana Begović. The AMSJ affair was one of the early points in the breakup of Đukanović's affair with Bulatović.

In a more serious affair, in January 1996, Đukanović and Maraš met with MI6 agent Joseph "Joe" Busby in Hotel Yugoslavia in Belgrade, where the idea of Montenegro declaring independence from the state union with Serbia was first mentioned to a foreign representative.

On at least two occasions, in 1996 and in May 1997, Bulatović requested the resignation of Maraš. Instead, Đukanović kept Maraš as a security assistant to the Ministry of Internal Affairs. Maraš initiated Operation Ljubović, an overnight raid of the Ljubović hotel in Podgorica five days before the 1997 election in which Đukanović ran, incriminating Bulatović's campaign of recruiting racketeers. Those arrested were released after the election and relieved of all charges by 2002.

Bulatović's actual departure from the DPS took place on 11 July 1997, when the DPS GO ("Glavni odbor") committee held a closed doors session, selecting Milica Pejanović-Đurišić to replace Bulatović as the party president. The party split had enormous implications, ultimately setting the stage for a confrontation between Đukanović and Bulatović inevitable. This manifested in the 1997 Montenegrin presidential election held in October, which Đukanović won by a thin margin. Clinton envoy Robert Gelbard testified about meeting Đukanović before and after the election in front of the U.S. Senate during the "Prospects for Democracy in Yugoslavia" hearings on 29 July 1999. Initially demanding greater autonomy, Đukanović and his supporters advocated Montenegrin nationalism, which supported independence and a separate Montenegrin identity. The key point for an active change of policy towards independence is the deprivation of Montenegro's federal rights by the Milošević federal regime.

=== Presidency during the Kosovo War ===
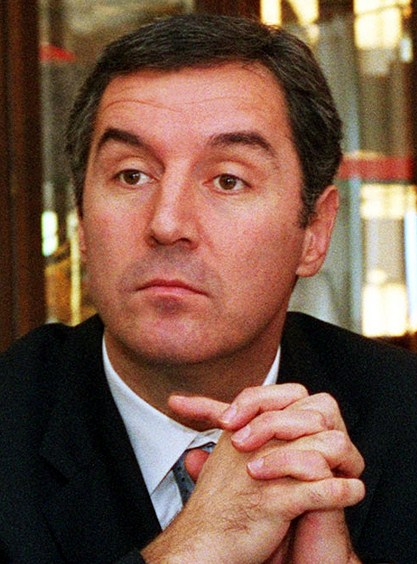
Đukanović at the Pentagon, November 1999

Shortly after his inauguration in 1998, Đukanović told Gelbard and some foreign ambassadors about his vision of an independent Montenegro in the Gorica villa. Đukanović said that Gelbard and the ambassadors disagreed with him at the time, as they preferred Đukanović to work with the opposition in Belgrade.

On 24 March 1999, NATO began bombing Yugoslavia. During the bombings, Jean-David Levitte claimed that Đukanović asked Bill Clinton for airstrikes to remove Milošević. Curious about Levitte's claim, Jacques Chirac called Đukanović to ask if the Clinton requests were true. Đukanović told Chirac that "every bomb that fell in Montenegro threatened to weaken my government." Chirac subsequently contacted Clinton and arranged limitations on airstrikes in Montenegro. Shortly after the bombings ceased, Đukanović oversaw the implementation of the Deutsche Mark as the new currency in Montenegro, replacing the Yugoslav Dinar.

In a speech in June 2016, Đukanović told an audience that "1999 was a year of critical importance for the choice of an independent Montenegrin way. That meaning the rejection of the self-destructive war with NATO, and secondly, the implementation of the Deutsche Mark a few months later."

=== Transition from Yugoslavia ===
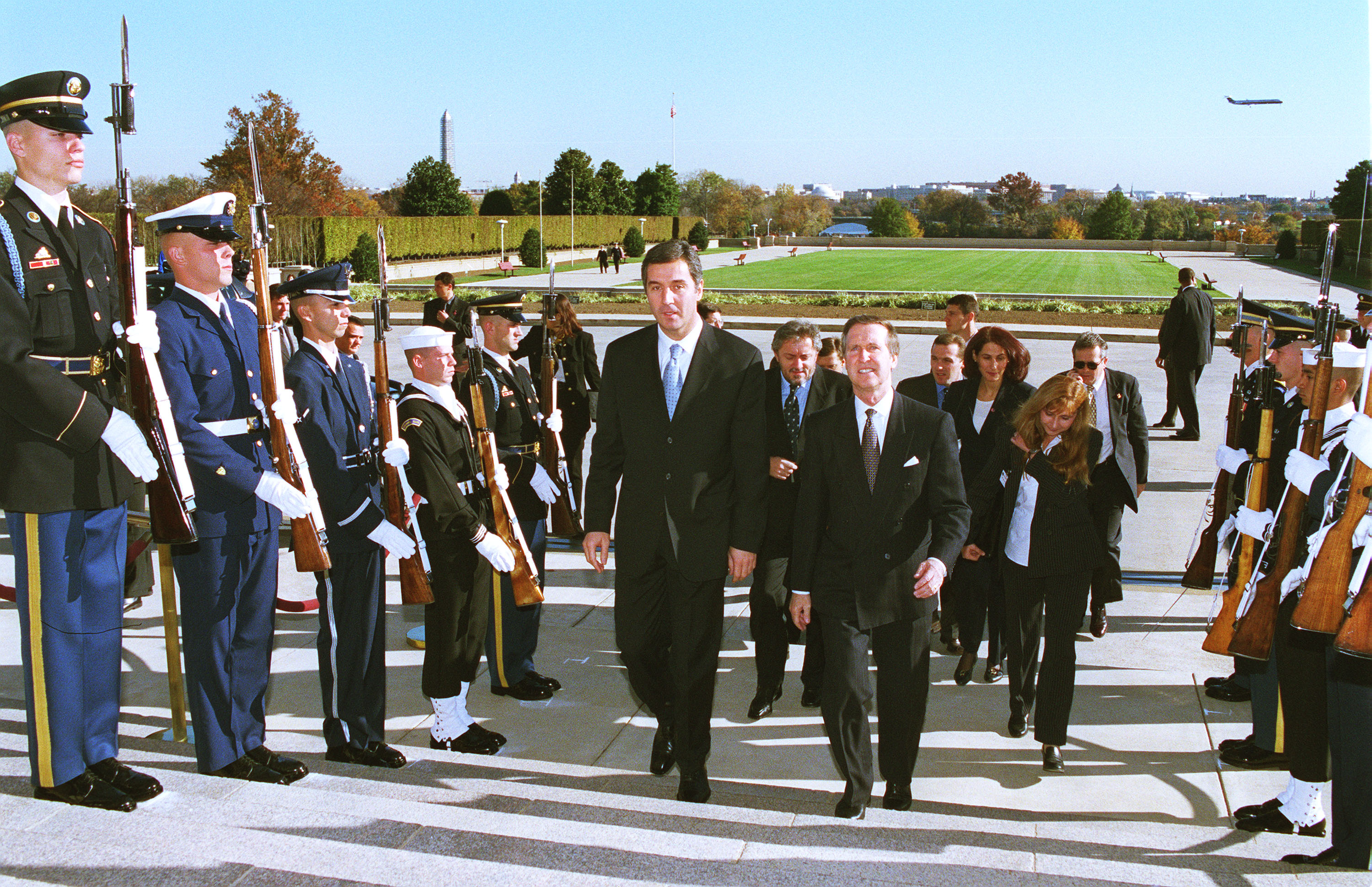
Đukanović meeting with U.S. Secretary of Defense William Cohen in The Pentagon, 4 November 1999

In June 2000, he apologised to Croatia for the Montenegrin participation in the siege of Dubrovnik, saying: "On my own behalf and on behalf of all the citizens of Montenegro I want to apologise to all citizens of Croatia, particularly in Konavli and Dubrovnik for all the pain and material damage inflicted by any member of the Montenegrin people."

After the overthrow of Milošević, Đukanović faced a dilemma as he no longer could use Milošević's international standing to argue for Montenegro's independence from Yugoslavia. In early 2002, Đukanović was subject to an investigation on international cigarette trafficking by the public prosecutor Giuseppe Scelsi of Bari. Simultaneously, he was involved in negotiations ahead of the Belgrade agreement, and Javier Solana tried persuading him to abstain from independence at least temporarily and that Montenegro should remain in Yugoslavia. After the meetings with Solana, Đukanović signed the Belgrade Agreement on 14 March 2002, in addition to the signatures of Filip Vujanović, Zoran Đinđić, Vojislav Koštunica, and Miroljub Labus. The agreement led to the Constitutional Charter of Serbia and Montenegro. It mandated that after a period of three years, Montenegro could hold a referendum on the question of independence. In a bid to prolong his executive powers, Đukanović and Prime Minister Vujanović agreed a job-swap that same year. Đukanović did not run for president in the 2002 election and Vujanović replaced him as the DPS candidate. On 25 November 2002, Đukanović resigned as president, several months before the end of his term, in order to become prime minister again. Vujanović, who had resigned as prime minister at the start of the month to become Speaker of the Montenegrin Parliament, was sworn in as acting president. Đukanović took office as prime minister on 8 January 2003. Vujanović succeeded him as president on 22 May 2003.

The 2006 Montenegrin independence referendum resulted in Montenegro declaring independence from the state union with Serbia. After the declaration of independence, Montenegro's Parliament appointed Đukanović as the first Minister of Defense. Đukanović also acted as the president of the National Council for Sustainable Growth, a member of the Council for European Integration, and the president of the Agency for Promotion of Foreign Investment's managing board. After independence had been achieved, Đukanović's brand of Montenegrin nationalism was no longer useful.

=== Resignation and first retirement (2006–2008) ===
On 3 October 2006, it was announced that Đukanović was stepping down as prime minister, despite the victory of his Coalition for a European Montenegro in the September 2006 parliamentary election, although he would remain leader of the Democratic Party of Socialists. On 4 October, he endorsed Željko Šturanović as his successor. The choice of Šturanović was considered a compromise between Đukanović and Svetozar Marović, as Đukanović's first candidate was Igor Lukšić, the Minister of Finance.

Đukanović formally ceased to be the Prime Minister on 10 November 2006, as the new Government was elected by Parliament of Montenegro. He cited his reasons for stepping down as "being tired of politics", and wishing to try himself out as a businessman. Đukanović served as a member of Parliament from October 2006 to February 2008. He announced that he might be willing to run in the April 2008 presidential election but eventually decided against it, allowing Vujanović to easily win a second term.

Đukanović headed the proclamation of the new Constitution of Montenegro on 22 October 2007. He received support from almost all DPS municipal boards and committees. Since 2006, Đukanović has opened five private businesses, the latest called Global Montenegro on 25 February 2008, and bought actions in his brother's bank, altogether amassing property worth millions of euros. His other four companies are: Universitas, Capital Invest, Primary Invest, and Select Investments.

=== Fifth term as prime minister (2008–2010) ===
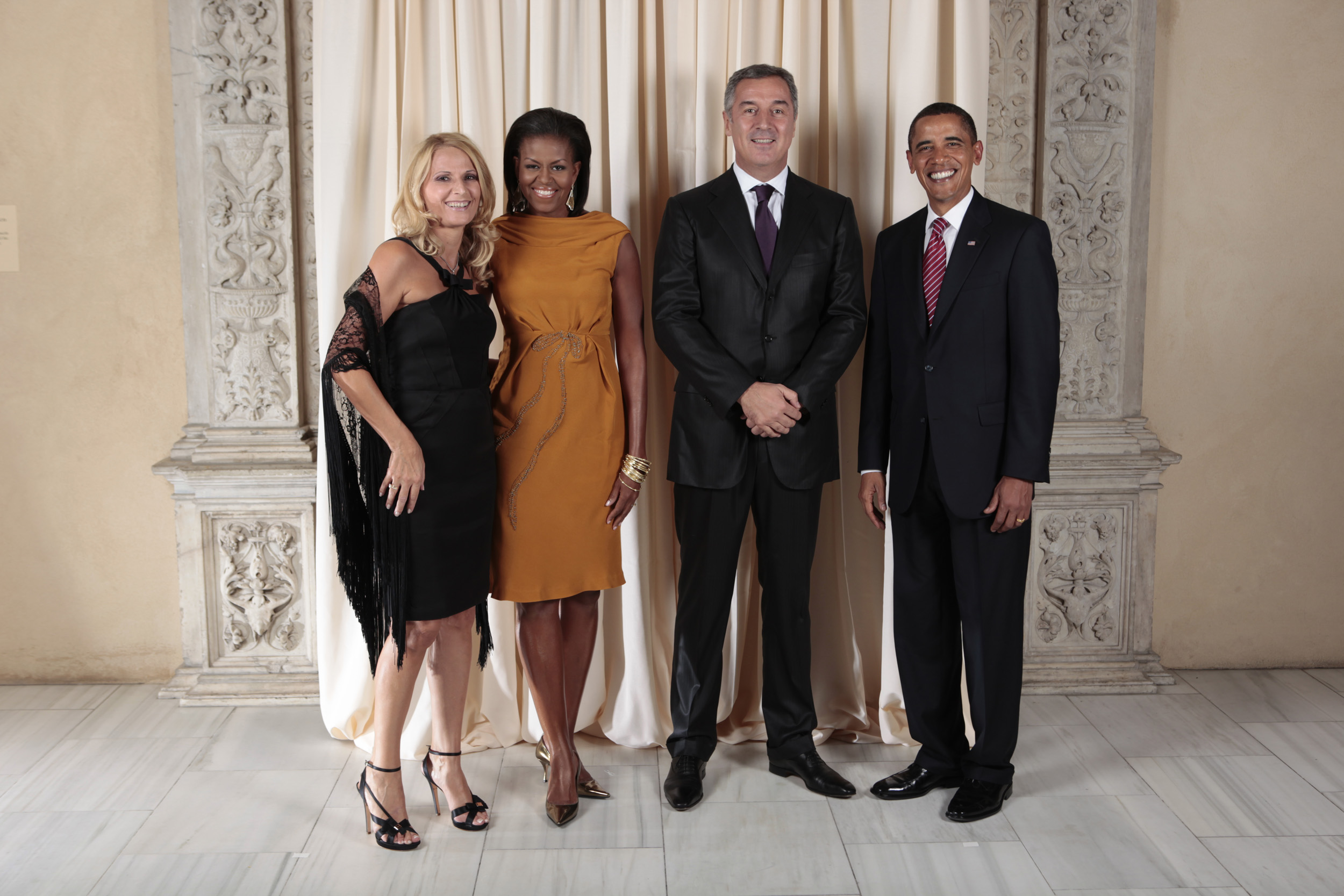
Đukanović and his wife posing alongside U.S. President Barack and First Lady Michelle Obama at the Metropolitan Museum of Art in New York City, 23 September 2009

On 20 February 2008, President Vujanović nominated Đukanović as prime minister after Šturanović resigned due to illness. He was accordingly elected as prime minister on 29 February 2008. His party won the 2009 parliamentary election.

From 2008, Đukanović's time in the office was marked with advancing EU and NATO integration processes, in which Montenegro mostly went ahead of its neighbors. In the meantime, on 9 October 2008, Montenegro recognized Kosovo's independence, becoming the fourth former Yugoslav republic to recognize Kosovo. In the 2009 parliamentary election, Đukanović's coalition again won a majority of seats.

Montenegro submitted its application for EU membership in December 2008. On 22 July 2009, EU Enlargement Commissioner Olli Rehn handed over the commission's Questionnaire to Đukanović in Podgorica and on 9 December 2009, Đukanović delivered to Rehn Montenegro's replies to the commission's Questionnaire in Brussels. Later that year Montenegro achieved visa liberalisation with the EU. On 1 May 2010, the Stabilisation and Association Agreement (SAA) entered into force. On 17 December 2010, Montenegro became an official EU candidate. As for Montenegro's NATO accession bid, the Allies decided to grant its request to join the Membership Action Plan (MAP) in December 2009.

=== Resignation and second retirement (2010–2012) ===
After giving indications he would step down once the European Union granted official candidate status to Montenegro's membership application, which it did on 17 December 2010, Đukanović resigned as prime minister on 21 December 2010. His party's leadership proposed Deputy Prime Minister and Finance Minister Igor Lukšić to lead the new government. Lukšić was confirmed as the new prime minister by the Parliament of Montenegro on 29 December 2010.

Just like when he stepped down last time, Đukanović again retained the DPS party chairmanship. Furthermore, he did not rule out possible future campaigns for public office, including a 2013 run for President of Montenegro or a run for another tenure as prime minister.

=== Sixth term as prime minister (2012–2016) ===
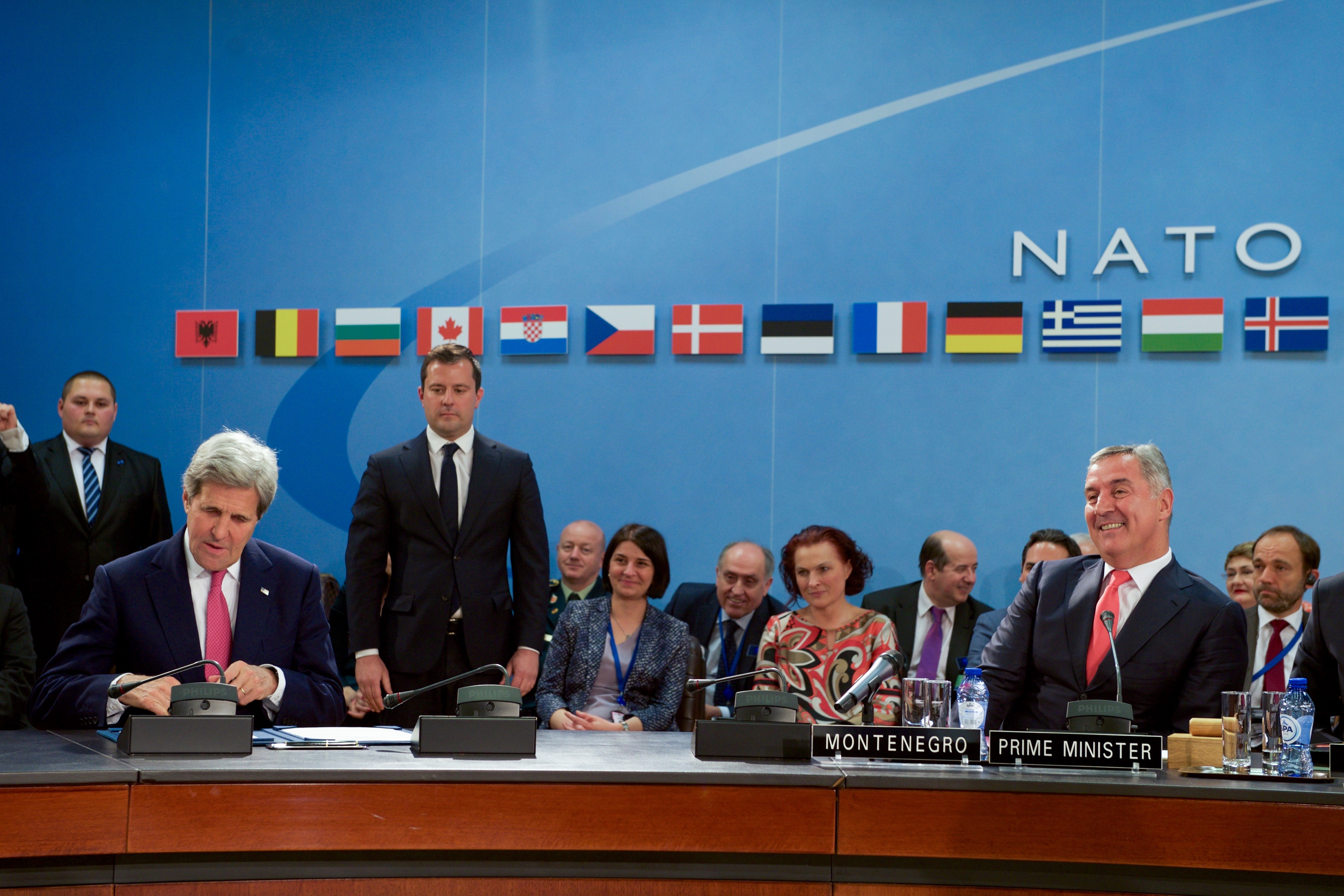
Đukanović alongside U.S. Secretary of State John Kerry, 19 May 2016

After the parliamentary election on 14 October 2012, Đukanović informed President Vujanović that he was capable of forming a government. His cabinet was approved by Parliament on 4 December 2012 and Đukanović returned to the office of prime minister on the same day. Together with Viktor Orbán of Hungary, Đukanović was a runner-up to Vladimir Putin for the Organized Crime and Corruption Reporting Project's 2014 "Person of the Year in Organized Crime" award, recognizing "the person who does the most to enable and promote organized criminal activity." He later won the award in 2015.

In 2016, following 2016 Montenegrin parliamentary election, Đukanović retired for a third time and stepped down as prime minister. However, he still remained the leader of DPS.

=== Re-election to presidency (2018) ===
In 2018, it was announced Đukanović would be his party's candidate for the 2018 presidential election. It was the second time Đukanović ran for president, the last time having been in the controversial 1997 election. He won the election by a large margin, as opposition parties by and large campaigned for independent candidate Mladen Bojanić.

In 2020, the Freedom House reported that years of increasing state capture, abuse of power, and strongman tactics employed by Đukanović have tipped his country over the edge – for the first time since 2003, Montenegro is no longer categorized as a democracy and became a hybrid regime.

==== 2020 parliamentary election ====
For the first time in three decades and for the first time since the introduction of multi-party politics in Montenegro, the opposition won more votes than Đukanović's ruling DPS. The OSCE and the ODIHR announced in preliminary findings that the 2020 elections were competitive and held in a highly polarized atmosphere especially regarding issues of church and national identity. They further concluded the election date had not been held in accordance with the Constitution, there had been no independent campaign coverage, and the ruling party had profited unjustifiably through widespread abuse of office and state resources.

On 1 September 2020, Đukanović accused Serbian President Aleksandar Vučić and Belgrade-based media of interfering in the internal politics of Montenegro, as well of alleged trying to revive a "Greater Serbia policy".

=== 2023 presidential election ===
Đukanović was eligible for re-election in the 2023 presidential election, since his first presidential term (1998–2003) was served before the 2006 independence referendum. Neither Đukanović nor his party announced to the public whether he planned to run in the elections, while Đukanović ultimately did not announce his candidacy until 24 February, two days before the deadline for submission of candidacies. The presidential elections were preceded by the 2022 Montenegrin local elections, which resulted in poor results for Đukanović's party.

In the first round, held on 19 March 2023, Đukanović received 35% of the vote, coming first. Jakov Milatović, candidate of the newly formed centrist Europe Now! movement, running on an anti-corruption platform, outperformed the polls, gaining 29% of the votes and faced Đukanović in the second round. The second round runoff, held two weeks later on 2 April, resulted in Milatović defeating Đukanović in a landslide, becoming the first elected president not being a member of the Đukanović's DPS since the introduction of the multi-party system in 1990, winning roughly 60% of the popular vote.

Following the election, Đukanović resigned as President of the DPS on 6 April, ending his 24 year tenure.

=== Economic policy ===
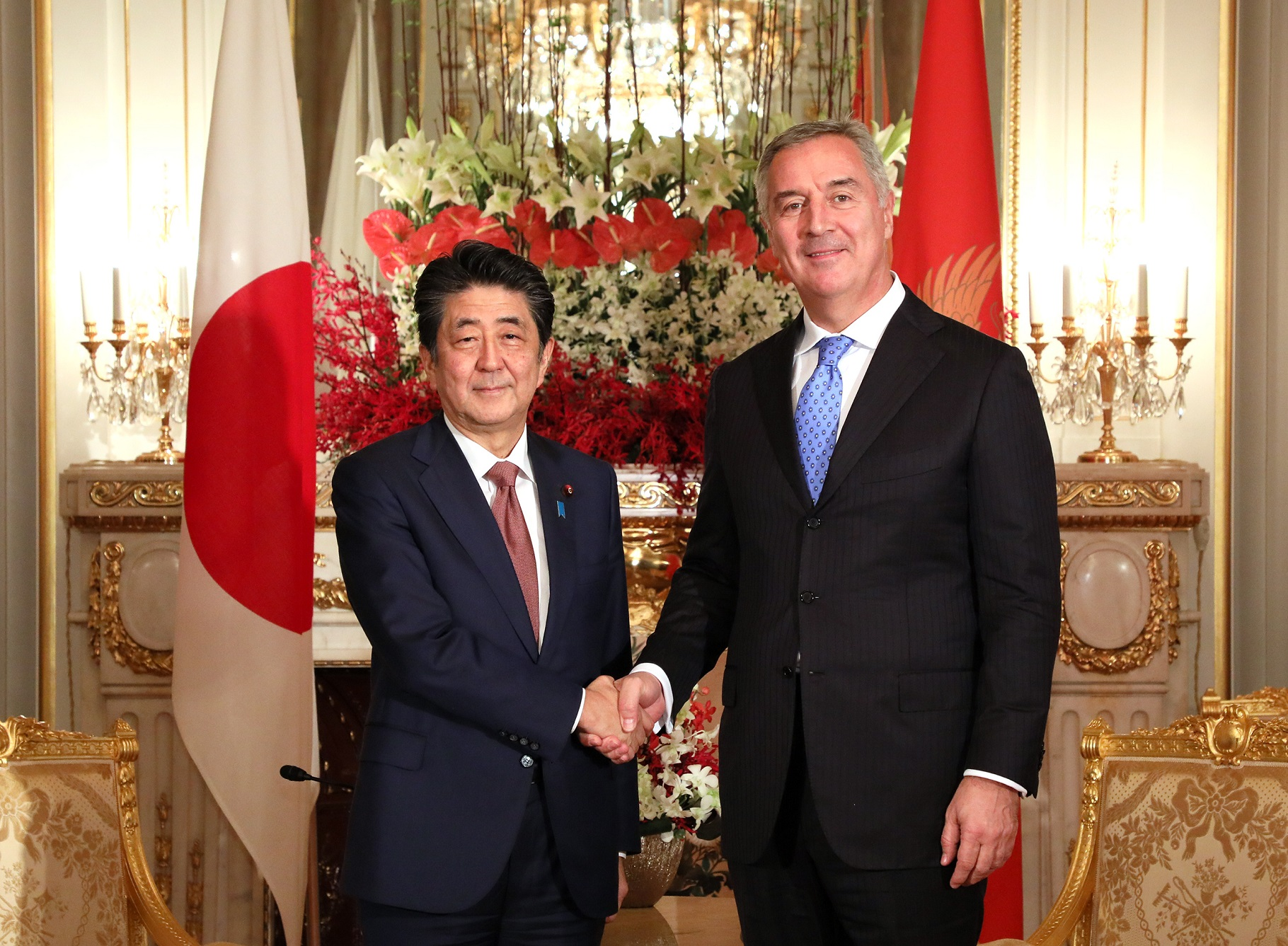
Đukanović with Japanese Prime Minister Shinzo Abe, 23 October 2019

The economic policy of Đukanović was focused on the development of tourism and privatisation. The Tivat shipyard, which was the pride of the Yugoslav navy, was bought by Canadian billionaire Peter Munk after Montenegro's independence and converted into a marina for rich foreigners. The Podgorica aluminium smelter – the country's only major industry – was sold in 2005 to Russian businessman Oleg Deripaska, who also joined forces with British banker Jacob Rothschild and French oligarch Bernard Arnault in a project to build "a new Monaco" on the shores of the Adriatic. Much of the former military land has been sold to investors, including the children of Azerbaijani President Ilham Aliyev and Egyptian billionaire Samih Sawiris, who are building a luxury complex and residences. Criminal networks have also taken advantage of the frenetic development of tourist activities and invested in hotel, casino and leisure park projects. The Splendid Hotel, the most emblematic of these constructions, hosted the lavish weddings of the children of Montenegro's most powerful "godfather", Branislav Mićunović, in the presence of the country's elites.

Privatisation has encouraged corruption and enriched those close to the government. Thus, according to Milka Tadić Mijović, president of the Centre for Journalistic Investigation, "those at the top take the biggest share of the corruption. Over the past thirty years, most of the state-owned companies have been privatised in a covert way. Ðukanović and his family have become the richest people in the country. His brother Aleksandar, who was unemployed, controls the capital of the largest financial institution in Montenegro, Prva Banka. His sister Ana, who was a judge during the privatisations, owns one of the biggest law firms. A foreign investor who does not want to have problems will be well advised to use the services of this firm.

This policy has also contributed to reinforcing regional disparities and social inequalities. By 2018, unemployment rose to 36.6% in the northern part of the country, compared to 3.9% in the coastal region, while a quarter of the population lived below the poverty line (2018).

== Controversies ==
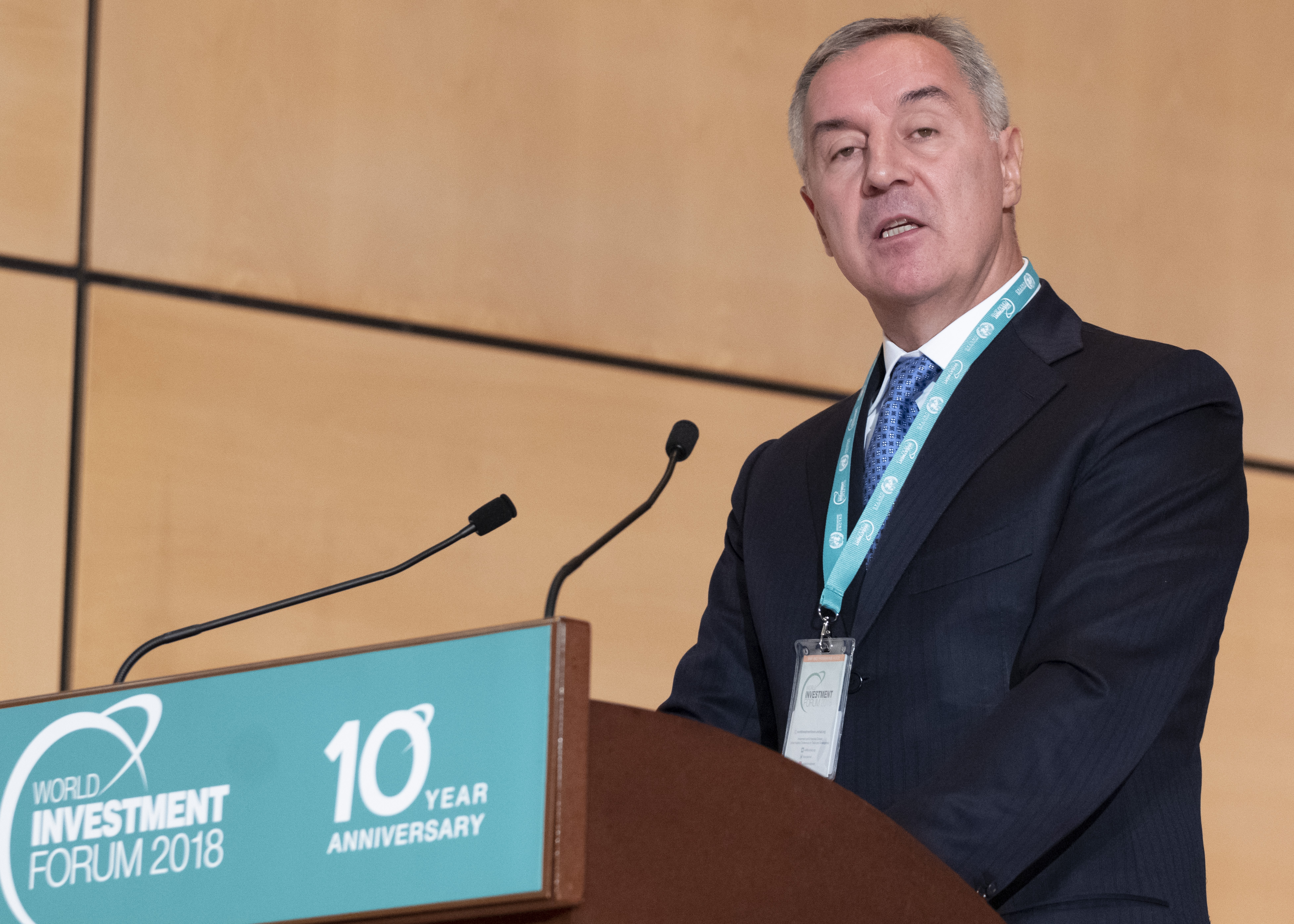
Đukanović giving a speech in 2018

=== Allegations of tobacco smuggling ===
In July 2003, the prosecutor's office in Naples linked Đukanović with an organised crime racket worth billions of euros. Đukanović called a press conference in Podgorica to deny the allegations as a "loathsome political trick", aimed at criminalising him and his country. Djukanovic has long been dogged by suspicions that he was involved in tobacco smuggling in Italy.

On 16 April 2003, the Judge for Preliminary Inquiries in Naples rejected the Antimafia Commission's request for a warrant for Đukanović's arrest, claiming him to be immune from arrest as Prime Minister of Montenegro. The commission had been investigating him for some time, since at least May 2002 and had further requested his arrest as a precautionary measure.

The case was appealed to the Naples Court of Review, which ruled in Đukanović's favor. Besides claiming his immunity, he was described as not socially dangerous as well as ignorant that he was committing crimes. The case was then once again appealed, to the Court of Cassation (Corte di Cassazione). On 28 December 2004, this court ruled in favor of the Antimafia Commission. It argued that as Montenegro was not a sovereign state, Đukanović had no diplomatic immunity.

After the independence referendum, Đukanović's lawyer, Enrico Tuccillo, said that "The referendum has confirmed the premise of the Prime Minister, Milo Đukanović, about the sovereignty of Montenegro: therefore no doubt can now remain about the immunity, granted to heads of state and of government, which Đukanović enjoyed and enjoys."

On 27 March 2008, Đukanović made a low-profile visit to the prosecutor's office in Bari. He was questioned for six-and-a-half hours and answered about 80 prosecutor's questions regarding the accusations against him. On this occasion, Đukanović's lawyer said that he had written evidence proving that, at the time when his client submitted the request to give a statement to the Italian prosecution authorities in Bari, he did not occupy any public office whatsoever and, therefore, had no intention of hiding behind immunity in the first place. In April 2009, the prosecution authorities finally dropped the case against Đukanović.

According to court documents, "Montenegro has been a haven for illegal trafficking, where criminals acted with impunity, while the ports of Bar and Kotor were used as logistic bases for motor boats, with protection which was guaranteed by the government." In December 2009, Francesco Forgione, a former Italian MP who led the Italian Parliament's Anti-Mafia Commission from 2006 to 2008, published a book titled Mafia Export which cited the Montenegrin mafia and Djukanovic as one of the organisers of international cigarette smuggling between 1994 and 2000. By 2000, the illegal trade was worth several billion dollars annually, according to EU and US agencies.

=== Pandora Papers and malversation ===
Đukanović was featured in the Pandora Papers, a leak of financial documents which were published in early October 2021. It was reported that Đukanović and his son Blažo have been passing money to offshore accounts since 2012, when they established secret asset management agreements behind a network of companies in more than five countries. He and his son established two trusts namely the Victoria Trust and Capecastel Trust. Đukanović admitted that he founded Victoria Trust while he was not a public office holder, that he had no business transactions or open bank accounts, and he claimed that at the end of the year, he transferred the ownership of his trust to Blažo. Đukanović's cabinet also stated that this leak is "a part of series of attempts to discredit Đukanović and his family members" and that the trusts only existed "on paper". Similar to this case, Đukanović previously denied owning businesses in other countries.

Prime Minister Zdravko Krivokapić called for investigation of Đukanović's family, while the Foreign Affairs Minister Đorđe Radulović commented on this situation by saying that "Đukanović misused his diplomatic passport when opening his private companies". Đukanović was also mentioned in a money laundering affair in which Rezart Taçi intervened with Đukanović for a transfer from the "president's bank".

=== Smears against journalists ===
Đukanović has a track record of attacking critical journalists and media outlets, smearing them as a "media mafia", claiming they are linked to organised crime, and calling them "rats", "monsters", "enemies of the state".

=== Anti-government riots ===
In 2015, the investigative journalists' network OCCRP has named Milo Đukanović "Person of the Year in Organized Crime". The extent of Đukanović's corruption led to street demonstrations and calls for his removal.

Several thousand protesters demanding the resignation of Milo Đukanović and the formation of an interim government marched in the centre of the capital Podgorica on the evening of 25 October 2015. Montenegrin police fired tear gas at opposition supporters, while chasing away the demonstrators with armored vehicles.

=== Sandžak ===
Muamer Zukorlić stated that Milo Đukanović previously promised that Bosniaks will have their autonomy within Montenegro, but that he went on to break their deal and that therefore his "conscience is not clear".

=== Religion law ===
As of December 2019 Montenegrin parliament proclaimed a controversial religion law which de jure transfers the ownership of church buildings and estates from the Serbian Orthodox Church in Montenegro to the Montenegrin state. In February 2020 Đukanović called the citizens protesting against the newly proclaimed religion law "a lunatic movement". The religion law is seen as a major factor in Đukanović and the DPS' defeat during the 2020 elections.

=== Cetinje enthronement crisis ===
After it was announced that the enthronement ceremony of Joanikije Mićović of the Serbian Orthodox Church as the Metropolitan of Montenegro and the Littoral would be held in Cetinje, the Church's ecclesiastical seat, on 5 September 2021, Đukanović called for the ceremony to be held elsewhere and stated that he would be present at the protest that day unless this was done. On 26 August, he chaired a session of the Defence and Security Council with all top officials of Montenegro attending. The Council session addressed the "security challenges caused by the announced enthronement of the Metropolitan of Montenegro and the Littoral" and urged "all socio-political actors" to keep peace and respect the Constitution and laws. On 4 September, on the eve of the scheduled enthronement, Đukanović arrived in the town of Cetinje along with some of his DPS colleagues. Both the Metropolitan and the Patriarch were flown to Cetinje by helicopter and then led into the monastery by heavily armed riot police holding bulletproof vests over their bodies to protect them, as riot police used tear gas to disperse protesters who hurled rocks and bottles at them and fired guns into the air. No fewer than 20 people were injured and police arrested more than a dozen people, including the security advisor to Đukanović, Veselin Veljović.

Following the enthronement, Đukanović, called it the government's Pyrrhic victory and "a great embarrassment of the Serbian Church and the government of Montenegro"; he later elaborated saying that the enthronement came as another one in a series of episodes in the renewed offensive of Serbian nationalism on Montenegro, the Krivokapić administration being "in the service of the Church of Serbia, which is an instrument for implementing the "Greater Serbia project", the official state policy of Belgrade". Montenegrin officials accused Đukanović and his party of an "attempted coup" following the riots. On 22 September, the Montenegrin parliament launched an inquiry to the Constitutional Court to rule if Đukanović had violated constitutional articles by backing the protesters. The Constitutional Court ultimately judged him not guilty on 4 February 2022.

== Legacy ==
The term milogorac (pl. milogorci; Serbian Cyrillic: милогорац, pl. милогорци), an ethnophaulism referring to anti-Serb Montenegrin nationalists, is a portmanteau of Đukanović's first name and crnogorac, the neutral word for a Montenegrin in Serbo-Croatian.

== Honours and awards ==
- Albanian National Flag Order received on 12 July 2016.
- Collar of the National Order of Merit of Paraguay on 23 December 2018.
- Grand Cross of the Order of San Marino received on 4 March 2022.

== See also ==
- List of youngest state leaders since 1900

== Bibliography ==
- Ivanović, Željko (2005). Crnogorski Diznilend. Podgorica: Daily Press – Vijesti. ISBN 86-7706-123-1.
- Morrison, Kenneth (2009). Nationalism, Identity and Statehood in Post-Yugoslav Montenegro. London: I.B. Tauris & Co Ltd. ISBN 978-1-84511-710-8.
- Roberts, Elizabeth (2009). Realm of the Black Mountain. Cornell University Press. ISBN 978-0801446016.
- Vulić, Z. (22 February 2000). "Ko je ovaj čovek: Milo Đukanović" (in Serbian). Glas javnosti.

Political offices
Preceded by New office Dragan Đurović (acting); Željko Šturanović; Igor Lukšić	Prime Minister of Montenegro; 1991–1998; 2003–2006; 2008–2010; 2012–2016	Succeeded by Filip Vujanović; Željko Šturanović; Igor Lukšić; Duško Marković
New office	Minister of Defence; Acting; 2006	Succeeded by Boro Vučinić
Preceded by Momir Bulatović; Filip Vujanović	President of Montenegro; 1998–2002; 2018–2023	Succeeded by Filip Vujanović; Jakov Milatović
Party political offices
Preceded by Milica Pejanović-Đurišić	Leader of the Democratic Party of Socialists; 1998–2023	Succeeded by Danijel Živković (acting)
Preceded by Savo Šekarić	Secretary of the Presidency of the League of Communists of Montenegro; 28 April 1989 – 22 June 1991	Abolished
