= Lukšić Cabinet =

Government of Montenegro

- 39th Cabinet of Montenegro
- 2010–2012
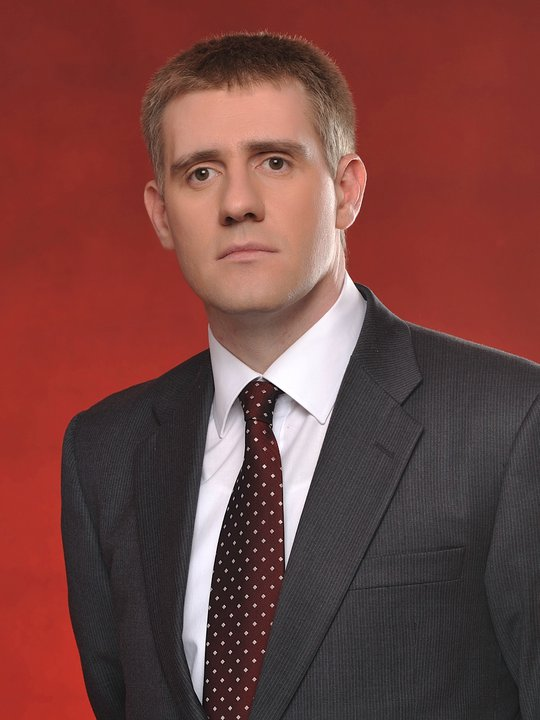
- Date formed: 29 December 2010
- Date dissolved: 4 December 2012

People and organisations
- Head of government: Igor Lukšić
- No. of ministers: 18 (1 of them without portfolio)
- Member parties: DPS, SDP, BS, DUA
- Status in legislature: Coalition government

History
- Election: 29 March 2009
- Predecessor: Đukanović V Cabinet
- Successor: Đukanović VI Cabinet

The Lukšić Cabinet, led by Igor Lukšić, is the 39th cabinet of the Montenegro. The cabinet was elected on 29 December 2010 by a majority vote in Montenegrin Parliament. It succeeded the sixth cabinet of Milo Đukanović. formed after the 2009 parliamentary election, after Đukanović resigned the prime minister. The coalition government was composed of the Democratic Party of Socialists (DPS), the Social Democratic Party (SDP), and ethnic minority parties.

== History ==
=== Đukanović resignation ===
Due to international controversies around him, the premiership of Milo Đukanović was seen as a major obstacle in the EU integration path of Montenegro. He eventually resigned four days after Montenegro was given official candidate status on 21 December 2010.

=== New government election ===
The DPS unanimously nominated Deputy Prime Minister Igor Lukšić as Đukanović's successor. The Parliament of Montenegro took a final vote on the matter on 29 December 2010. The cabinet comprised ministers from the Democratic Party of Socialists (DPS), Social Democratic Party (SDP), Bosniak Party (BS) and Democratic Union of Albanians (DUA). It consists mostly of the same ministers from the previous Đukanović cabinet.

== Cabinet composition ==
Portfolio	Minister	Party	Took office
Prime Minister
General Affairs	Igor Lukšić	DPS	29 December 2010
Deputy Prime Ministers
Justice	Duško Marković	DPS	29 December 2010
Economic and Financial Policy	Vujica Lazović	SDP	10 November 2006
Ministers
Foreign Affairs	Milan Roćen	DPS	10 November 2006
Agriculture and Rural Development	Tarzan Milošević	DPS	29 December 2010
Defence	Boro Vučinić	DPS	10 November 2006
Finance	Milorad Katnić	DPS	29 December 2010
Education and Sports	Migo Stijepović	DPS	29 December 2010
Science	Sanja Vlahović	DPS	29 December 2010
Culture	Branislav Mićunović	DPS	29 February 2008
Economy	Vladimir Kavarić	DPS	29 December 2010
Traffics and Naval Affairs	Andrija Lompar	SDP	10 November 2006
Sustainable Development and Tourism	Predrag Sekulić	DPS	29 December 2010
Health	Miodrag Radunović	DPS	10 November 2006
Human and Minority Rights	Fehrat Dinosha	DUA	10 june 2009
Labour and Social Welfare	Suad Numanović	DPS	10 November 2006
Internal Affairs	Ivan Brajović	SDP	10 june 2009
Without Portfolio	Rafet Husović	BS	10 june 2009

== See also ==
- Igor Lukšić
- Government of Montenegro
