= 2019 Montenegrin anti-corruption protests =

Anticorruption protests in Montenegro

2019 Montenegrin protests
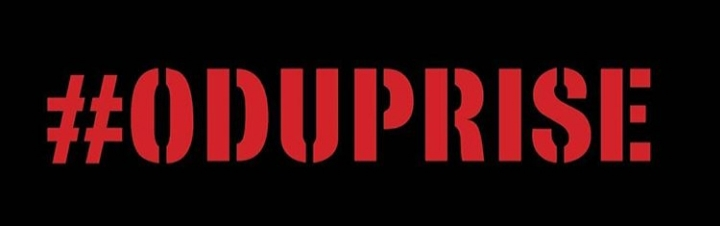
- One of the symbols of the 2019 Montenegrin anti-corruption protests depicting hashtag "Resist!"
- Date: 2 February – 7 December 2019
- Location: Mostly in Podgorica, Montenegro
- Caused by: Corruption within the government; Authoritarianism of Milo Đukanović; Media censorship; Partitocracy and nepotism; Accusations of electoral fraud
- Goals: Freedom of speech; Resignation of Đukanović and several senior state officials; Technical government; Free and fair elections
- Methods: Demonstrations, civil disobedience, civil resistance, internet activism
- Result: Agreement on the Future

Parties
Civic organisations: 97,000 – Resist!; To freedom!; Student initiative; Montenegrin opposition: Democratic Montenegro; Democratic Alliance; The Montenegrin; United Reform Action; Social Democratic Party; Democratic Front; Socialist People's Party; United Montenegro	President of Montenegro; Montenegrin government; Ministry of Internal Affairs; National Security Agency; Government parties and its support: Democratic Party of Socialists; Social Democrats; Bosniak Party; Albanians Decisively; Croatian Civic Initiative; Liberal Party

Lead figures
Džemal Perović Aleksa Bečić; Miodrag Lekić; Vladimir Pavićević; Dritan Abazović; Duško Knežević	Milo Đukanović; Milan Roćen Duško Marković; Predrag Bošković; Mevludin Nuhodžić

In February 2019, protests began in Montenegro against President Milo Đukanović, Prime Minister Duško Marković, and the government led by the ruling Democratic Party of Socialists (DPS), which has been in power since the introduction of multi-party system in 1990.

The anti-government protests have been organized by the civil sector of the Montenegrin society, concurrently with the protests in the neighboring Serbia, that had similar goals.

The protests failed in mid-2019. Involved in corruption affairs within the government and the ruling DPS remain in their offices.

== Background ==
=== Allegations of corruption ===
In 2015, the investigative journalists' network OCCRP named Montenegro's long-time president and Prime Minister Milo Đukanović "Person of the Year in Organized Crime"; five years prior the British daily The Independent placed him on a list of the world's top 20 richest leaders, describing the source of his wealth as "mysterious". Đukanović denies most of the claims about his wealth.

In 2016, Vice President Svetozar Marović of Đukanović's Democratic Party of Socialists (DPS) was arrested in connection to a long-running corruption case concerning his hometown of Budva; the Montenegrin prosecutor's office labeled him as "head of Budva criminal group," which he later admitted in court.

=== The "Atlas" and "Envelope" affairs ===
In mid-January, a video clip from 2016 surfaced in which President Đukanovićs former ally, businessman Duško Knežević, chairman of the Montenegro-based Atlas Group, appeared to hand the Mayor of Podgorica and high-ranked DPS member, Slavoljub Stijepović, an envelope containing what Knežević later said was $97,000, to fund a Democratic Party of Socialists parliamentary election campaign. After fleeing to London, Knežević told the media he had been providing such unreported money to the DPS for the past 25 years.

Another video Knežević released in February showed a senior Montenegrin Central Bank official asking for a bribe for not sending inspectors into one of Knežević's banks. He has also released documents claiming proof that he helped finance Đukanović's lavish travels abroad and his personal expenses.

=== Assault on journalist Olivera Lakić ===
In early May 2018 Olivera Lakić, an investigative journalist from the Montenegrin daily newspaper Vijesti, was shot and wounded in front of her house in Podgorica after she published a series of articles about allegedly corrupt businesses involving top state officials and their families. The identity of the shooter is still unknown.

=== Accusations of electoral fraud ===
All 39 opposition MPs (out of 81 in total) are boycotting Parliament since the constitution of its current convocation in December 2016, due to claims of electoral fraud at the 2016 parliamentary elections.

Opposition started demanding a snap elections and reform of Montenegrin electoral system, as well the electoral laws. The largest opposition subject, Democratic Front (DF), decided to end the boycott and return to parliament in December 2017, as did newly formed United Montenegro (UGC). The Social Democratic Party (SDP) and the DEMOS both decided to end the boycott and return to parliament, after poor results in May 2018 local elections, as did Socialist People's Party (SNP) leaving Democratic Montenegro (DCG) and United Reform Action (URA), who remained in the boycott with the same demands.

== Anti-corruption protests ==
Protests started after the revelation of footage and documents that appear to implicate top officials in obtaining suspicious funds for the Đukanović' party. The demonstrations were organized by newly formed 97,000 – Odupri se! ("97,000 – Resist!") civic group, an informal group of intellectuals, academics, NGO activists and journalists and supported from Montenegrin parliamentary opposition parties: Democratic Montenegro, United Reform Action, DEMOS, Socialist People's Party, Social Democratic Party, United Montenegro, as well as Democratic Front alliance (all 39 opposition MPs, out of 81 in total) and newly formed extra-parliamentary parties such as the populist True Montenegro, the liberal the Montenegrin and the left-wing New Left. They demanded that the government fold for the formation of a technical government, on the grounds that the conditions for free and transparent elections are not in place, but also for the resignation of President Đukanovic and the chief prosecutor for organized crime, among other people. The leader and the most notable figure of the protests was Džemal Perović, a civic activist, former MP of the Liberal Alliance.

The political backgrounds of protesters and organisers are diverse, with both left-wing, liberal, moderate, and right-wing factions voicing opposition to the government. As support to the main protests in Podgorica, political parties Democrats, Demos and the Montenegrin organized a series of separate minor protests led by its leaders Aleksa Bečić, Miodrag Lekić and Vladimir Pavićević in other Montenegrin settlements, under the slogan "He is done, don't be afraid!". On 30 March, all 39 opposition MPs in the 81-seat parliament signed “Agreement for the Future”, proposed by the protest organizers a week before, pledging unity in the fight against the 30-year rule of Đukanović's party. Đukanović, Marković, and other prominent ruling party representatives denied that the country was going through a political crisis, accusing protesters of being financed and organized by the opposition parties and businessman Duško Knežević and that their goal was to destabilize the country. Organizers reject any connection with Knežević, considering him as part of the corrupt Montenegrin system. In mid-April 2019 after he stopped supporting the protests and its organizers, Knežević, in absentia formed his own civic group named "To freedom!", announcing parallel anti-government protests. Protests eventually have failed in mid-2019.

=== Demands ===
Organizers accuse President Milo Đukanović of presiding over poverty, a loss of human rights and media freedom, partocracy and systematic corruption. The organizers' main demands are his resignation, but also of Prime Minister Duško Marković and his cabinet, to form a technical government that would prepare the conditions for free and transparent elections. They seek the resignation also of the State Prosecutor Ivica Stanković, and the chief prosecutor for organized crime Milivoje Katnić, accusing both of ignoring evidence and not prosecuting manifest corruption in the ranks of Đukanović's inner circle. Protesters later demanded irrevocable resignations of the Montenegrin state-owned broadcaster, its council and the director general, accusing them of partiality and ruling-party propaganda.

== Electoral Laws Reform Board ==
In August 2019 the opposition Democratic Montenegro and United Reform Action parties, although initially boycotted, both decided to participate in the future work of the board for electoral system reform, following the intervention of the European Union Delegation in Montenegro and European Enlargement Commissioner Johannes Hahn, in order to create conditions for holding fair and free elections in 2020.

After the Democratic Montenegro (Democrats) joined the Board, the right-wing Democratic Front alliance decides to quit, accusing the Democrats of betraying opposition interests.

Board eventually failed at the end of December 2019, after the Democrats left the board sessions in the protest to passing the controversial religious law by the Parliament of Montenegro, accusing the ruling party of inciting ethnic hatred and unrest.

== Aftermath ==
As of December 2019 another wave of protest started in Montenegro, against the newly adopted controversial religion law which de jure transfers the ownership of church buildings and estates from the Serbian Orthodox Church in Montenegro to the Montenegrin state, with a portion of 2019 protesters joining the new movement.

In its political rights and civil liberties worldwide report in May 2020, Freedom House marked Montenegro as a hybrid regime rather than a democracy because of declining standards in governance, justice, elections and media freedom. Freedom House stated that years of increasing state capture, abuse of power and strongman tactics employed by long-term Prime Minister and President Milo Đukanović had tipped country over the edge, and for the first time since 2003, Montenegro was no longer categorised as a democracy. The report emphasised the unequal electoral process, cases of political arrests, negative developments related to judicial independence, media freedoms, as well as a series of unresolved cases of corruption within the DPS-led government.

To date, no official proceedings have been initiated against corruption within a DPS-led government, involved in corruption scandals remain in their offices. As of announcing the parliamentary election for August 2020, anti-corruption protest organizers, along with some opposition parties, started a campaign for the boycott of the 2020 parliamentary elections, claiming that the elections would not be held under fair conditions.

== See also ==
- Serbian protests (2018–2020)
- 2019–20 Clerical protests in Montenegro
- 2020 Montenegrin parliamentary election
- 2022 Montenegrin crisis
