= Ratko Butorović =

Montenegrin businessman (1956–2013)

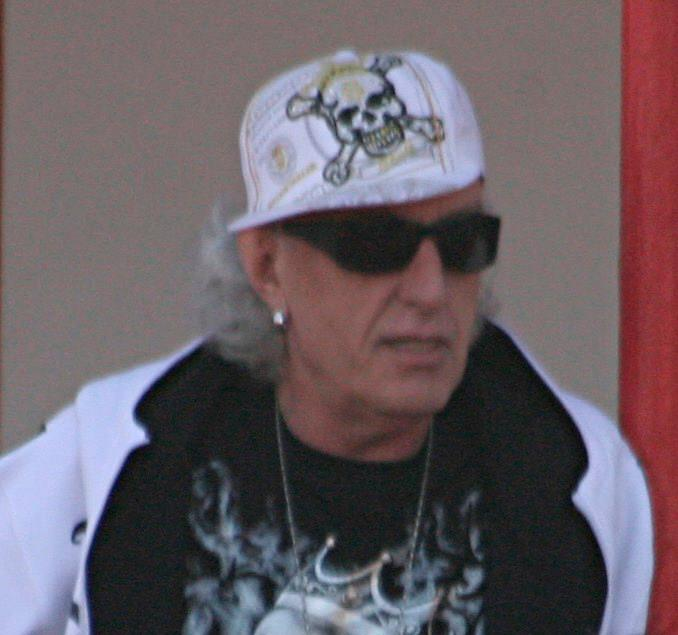
- Butorović in 2012
- Born: Ratko Butorović; 17 July 1956; Nikšić, PR Montenegro, FPR Yugoslavia
- Died: 8 June 2013 (aged 56); Novi Sad, Serbia
- Resting place: Kočani Cemetery, Nikšić, Montenegro
- Education: University of Novi Sad
- Occupations: FK Vojvodina owner (2006-2013); Hotel Park owner (2004-2013); Hotel Leopold I operator (2006-2013)
- Children: Balša Butorović; Bodin Butorović

Ratko Butorović (17 July 1956 – 8 June 2013) also known as Bata Kan Kan was a controversial Montenegrin–Serbian entrepreneur and businessman.

Born in Nikšić, Butorović found success in Novi Sad where he owned several hospitality venues and also had a stint owning the city's best-known football club FK Vojvodina. Known for his colourful clothing and eccentric ways, he also maintained alleged ties to various underworld figures in Serbia and Montenegro such as Đorđe Božović and Brano Mićunović.

== Early life ==
Growing up in Nikšić, Butorović's extended family included his maternal cousin Milo Đukanović (six years Buturović's junior and son of Buturović's maternal uncle Radovan) who would later go on to become the longtime political and state leader of Montenegro.

In the early-to-mid-1970s, after completing high school in his hometown, teenage Buturović moved northwards to SR Serbia: first to Belgrade before eventually settling in Novi Sad where he enrolled in the mechanical engineering program at the University of Novi Sad's Faculty of Technical Sciences. It was in Novi Sad where Buturović grew close to Brano Mićunović, a fellow Nikšić-born-and-bred Montenegrin who had, much like Buturović, arrived in Novi Sad in search of expanded opportunities and was already well on his way to becoming an influential organized crime figure. Young Buturović quickly developed a knack for entrepreneurship, often of the illegal or semi-legal variety, reportedly making his first money by selling clothing items stolen in Italy that had been smuggled into SFR Yugoslavia.

In his twenties, Butorović moved on to Vienna where, having had a strong physical build, he found employment as bouncer and bodyguard. It was reportedly during his time in Vienna that Buturović developed a close friendship with reputed mobster Đorđe "Giška" Božović. After Vienna, Buturović spent some time in Paris. By mid-1980s, he returned to SR Serbia within SFR Yugoslavia where he decided to modify his last name from Buturović to Butorović, reportedly in an effort of making himself harder to track down due to transgressions committed abroad.

== Business career ==
Butorović's first foray into entrepreneurship took place in 1987 via opening a consumer goods retail store in Novi Sad. Named 'Kan Kan' (after the can-can dance), the store further cemented his by now well-known nickname around town and soon expanded into a chain of shops throughout the city. Butorović soon diversified his business activities by establishing a rent-a-car company as well as an airport taxi service shuttling passengers between Novi Sad and Belgrade Airport.

By the early 1990s, Butorović was based out of a small office located in the state-owned Hotel Park in Novi Sad and involved in various business and community activities, including running a pawnbroker's shop and donating a medical vehicle to the Serbian forces fighting in the Battle of Vukovar.

In September 1995, nineteen-year-old beauty queen Jelena Molnar was found dead in a Hotel Park room, leased out to Butorović's company, where she had been staying with her twenty-three-year-old Cetinje-born boyfriend Predrag Maričić, one of Butorović's bodyguards. As a result, Butorović left Serbia and FR Yugoslavia, settling in Greece. Maričić was charged with murder, but eventually got acquitted following a Novi Sad District Court trial that saw Butorović provide testimony. The lower court verdict got appealed by the public prosecutor and the case went before the Serbian Supreme Court where Maričić got acquitted again.

While in Greece, Butorović resided in Thessaloniki, running a department store in the city in addition to several small hotels in Chalkidiki. For two years he reportedly held majority stake in the ownership of P.A.O.K. basketball club. The source of Butorović's wealth was often questioned with many speculating about his investments being a front for Đukanović's and Mićunović's ill-gotten funds. In several 1990s and early 2000s Serbian Interior Ministry (MUP) internal notes that have subsequently become public through freedom of information requests, Butorović is explicitly mentioned as "having direct ties and maintaining constant contact with Montenegrin organized crime groups".

=== Hospitality, construction, and property management ===
In 1998, following a controversial decision by the Budva municipality president to privatize the historic Hotel Jadranska Straža seaside property via circumventing the usual procedure of putting it to a vote before the municipal parliament, Butorović bought the small hotel for reportedly DM480,000. With a history dating back to the 9th century, the property — that had at one point been a Benedictine monastery — is designated as a structure of special importance. After having his expansion projects of building a marina and other luxury amenities rejected by the authorities, Butorović decided to sell Hotel Jadranska Straža to reputed Montenegrin mobster Blagota "Baja" Sekulić.

In 2000, Butorović began making larger investments in the hospitality industry. His first property of note was Xanadu, a 5-star boutique hotel in Kumbor near Herceg Novi in Montenegro, FR Yugoslavia, whose construction he financed before selling it several years later to a Russian investor.

He then financed the construction of a 6,500 m^{2} shopping center on Kralja Aleksandra Street in Novi Sad. Named Pariski Magazin, the property opened in 2003, housing a series of cafes, spas, beauty parlours, and retail shops.

==== Hotel Park ====
In 2004, Butorović made his biggest investment, buying Novi Sad's state-owned Hotel Park for RSD100 million (~€1.25 million) at a privatization tender auction. Refurbishing and upgrading the 22,000 m^{2} property that had already been the seat of his business activities for more than a decade, Butorović turned it into Novi Sad's premier hospitality venue.

==== Hotel Leopold I ====
In August 2006, at an international tender auction, Butorović's company HTUP Park won 30-year lease rights to Hotel Varadin on the Petrovaradin Fortress. Under the terms of the concession agreement signed by the Novi Sad mayor Maja Gojković and HTUP Park representative Kosta Kliska, Butorović's company took on the obligation of investing at least €6 million into the 5,405 m^{2} property while being allowed to forgo the payment of a lease fee to the city during the initial five years of the agreement. Furthermore, it committed to commence payment of the lease fee of €3.8 / m^{2} per month (€21,000 per month) to the city of Novi Sad once five years of the agreement have expired in September 2011. Many found the agreed lease amount to be ridiculous considering the average lease fee in Novi Sad at the time had been at least twice that and that the venue in question is a premier property — centrally located baroque hotel. Butorović reportedly invested €6.5 million in the hotel renovation, re-opening it in June 2007 under the new name Hotel Leopold I after the 17th century Holy Roman Emperor. The exact amount of the investment Butorović made in the hotel has been disputed, however, due to lack of oversight.

On 15 November 2007, the 200-meter long protective rampart, located at the Gornja tvrđava section of the Fortress in the hotel's near vicinity, got demolished. It was unclear who ordered the demolition with fingers being pointed back and forth between Butorović and several local publicly owned companies with jurisdiction over the Fortress. Eventually, the excavator operator Stjepan R. who carried out the demolition got arrested, but the responsibility for who ordered the action never got established. The rampart was subsequently re-built.

In January 2014, some six months following Butorović's death, his older son Balša confirmed that the family is no longer involved in running the hotel on a day-to-day basis, having decided to sublease it to a foreign entity.

=== FK Vojvodina ===
In 2006 Butorović became the owner of the struggling FK Vojvodina football club in Serbia. His investment triggered a revival in the club's fortunes, immediately breaking into the top three in the Serbian SuperLiga. Led by incoming head coach Milovan Rajevac and benefiting from the 17 league goals by twenty-three-year-old striker Ranko Despotović as well as midfield enterprise of newly acquired twenty-seven-year-old Milan Davidov and returning thirty-three-year-old veteran Miodrag Pantelić, Vojvodina finished third in the league (club's best league finish in a decade) and made the Serbian Cup final where they lost to Red Star Belgrade. Furthermore, the season saw regular playing time and continued development opportunities for their up-and-coming squad assets: eighteen-year-old attacking midfielder Dušan Tadić, nineteen-year-old midfielder Gojko Kačar, and twenty-two-year-old goalkeeper Damir Kahriman.

==== 2008 arrest on match-fixing suspicion ====
On Tuesday, 29 January 2008, Butorović got arrested on suspicion of match fixing. His apprehension came as part of a sweeping action by Serbian police aimed at dealing with widespread football corruption in the country. Police suspected that Butorović, along with FK Vojvodina managing board president Milan Čabrić, fixed football matches by bribing football referees Mihajlo Jeknić and Borislav Kašanski whom he established contact with through former referee Goran Kovačić. Čabrić, Jeknić, Kašanski, and Kovačić were all also arrested on the same day. Butorović got taken in spectacular fashion as police stormed his villa in Stanoja Glavaša Street in the Telep neighbourhood around 4pm while some twenty investigators and plain-clothed policemen reportedly searched his house for relevant evidence before taking him to a police station around 7pm. A small number of FK Vojvodina fans gathered in front of his house while police searched it, offering support by chanting "Don't give up, Bata".

Butorović was later released with no charges pressed against him due to lack of evidence. Although Butorović was well known as the high-ranking member of the Montenegrin mafia in Novi Sad, this was the only time he was even investigated for any of his crimes. Reputedly he was protected by the Montenegrin president Milo Đukanović.

==== SD Vojvodina ====
In December 2011, Butorović was among the group of businessmen and former athletes that revived the dissolved Vojvodina sports society, an umbrella entity presiding over 22 men's and women's clubs carrying the "Vojvodina" name in various sports. The organization had existed for more than 90 years throughout the 20th century before falling on hard times financially and dissolving through bankruptcy during the late 2000s. Butorović was appointed president of the revived entity, a position he performed in parallel to his duties at FK Vojvodina.

== Personal ==
In the late 1980s, Butorović married his wife Smiljka. They have two sons, Balša and Bodin. Butorović was known for his colourful lifestyle and flamboyance, adopting an extravagant style of dress and reportedly being friends with rapper 50 Cent.

=== Death ===
Butorović died of natural causes in 2013. His body was discovered in the morning hours of 8 June 2013 in a suite within his Hotel Park in Novi Sad; he was last seen alive the night before around 8:00 pm at the same hotel during a meeting with FK Vojvodina's managing board members and newly named head coach Marko Nikolić after which Butorović retired to the hotel suite he had reportedly often been using as a second home. Following an autopsy, it was concluded that he died in his sleep as a result of suffering a heart attack. Butorović had a history of coronary issues, even undergoing surgery in 2006 at the Sremska Kamenica Institute for Cardiovascular Diseases during which he had several stents inserted.

Two days after his death, a commemorative gathering in memory of Butorović was held at Hotel Park's Crystal Hall; it was attended by his family as well as friends and colleagues, including FK Vojvodina vice-president Dušan Vlaović, Srbijagas CEO Dušan Bajatović, businessman Miodrag Kostić, Serbian Football Association (FSS) president Tomislav Karadžić and secretary-general Zoran Laković, entire FK Vojvodina player squad, and various individuals from the world of football such as controversial administrator Zvezdan Terzić, coaches Milovan Rajevac, Dragoljub Bekvalac, etc.

=== Funeral ===
On 12 June 2013, before being transported to Belgrade Nikola Tesla Airport and flown to Montenegro for burial, the coffin with Butorović's body was displayed at Novi Sad's city cemetery — where, among others, pop-folk star Nataša Bekvalac came to pay her respects.

Upon landing in Montenegro in the early afternoon, Butorović's body was transported to his birthplace Nikšić to be displayed in the city chapel where the family received condolences alongside FK Vojvodina squad players, head coach Marko Nikolić, and sporting director Miodrag Pantelić before the funeral procession headed to the Kočani cemetery on the town's outskirts for burial. Among those present at the funeral were Butorović's first cousin, Montenegrin Prime Minister Milo Đukanović alongside his family—wife Lidija Kuč, son Blažo, influential businessman brother Aco Đukanović, and court judge sister Ana Kolarević—in addition to high-ranking members of his DPS party (the ruling party in Montenegro): Svetozar Marović, Milan Roćen, Branimir Gvozdenović, Tarzan Milošević, Suad Numanović, Mevludin Nuhodžić, Milutin Simović, etc. Also present were Butorović's close friend, organized crime figure Brano Mićunović, Montenegrin FA (FSCG) president and former football great Dejan Savićević alongside his deputy Momir Đurđevac, Montenegrin Basketball Federation (KSCG) officials and businessmen Vesko Barović and Danilo Mitrović, businessman Duško Knežević, retired footballer Mateja Kežman, coaches Dejan Vukićević and Nebojša Vignjević, etc.

In July 2019, six years after his death, Butorović's widow put their 708 m^{2} Novi Sad villa up for sale, listed at €1.34 million.

== Additional sources ==
- http://inserbia.info/today/2013/06/president-of-fc-vojvodina-found-dead/
