= Đukanović V Cabinet =

Government of Montenegro

- 38th Cabinet of Montenegro
- 2008–2010
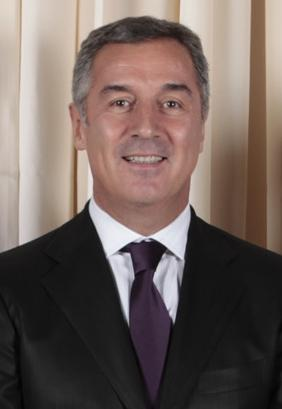
- Date formed: 29 February 2008
- Date dissolved: 29 December 2010

People and organisations
- Head of government: Milo Đukanović
- No. of ministers: 19 (2 of them without portfolio)
- Member parties: ECG, DUA
- Status in legislature: Coalition government

History
- Elections: 2006, 2009
- Predecessor: Šturanović Cabinet
- Successor: Lukšić Cabinet

The fifth cabinet of Milo Đukanović was the cabinet of Montenegro from 29 February 2008 to 29 December 2010. It was a coalition government composed of Coalition for a European Montenegro and Democratic Union of Albanians.

== History ==
=== Šturanović resignation ===
Prime Minister Željko Šturanović resigned from office on 31 January 2008 for health reasons, saying that the therapy he was prescribed required him to work much less than would be possible while serving as prime minister. He remained in office until Đukanović was approved by Parliament and sworn in at the end of February.

=== Đukanović return to the office ===
On 20 February 2008, President Filip Vujanović nominated former long-term PM Milo Đukanović as new prime minister after Šturanović resigned. He was accordingly elected as prime minister on 29 February 2008 by a majority vote in the Parliament of Montenegro, which marks his return to office after retiring in 2006.

=== 2009 parliamentary election ===
Elections for the composition of the new parliament of Montenegro were held on 29 March 2009 and resulted in a new absolute majority won for the ruling Coalition for a European Montenegro (DPS, SDP and BS) led by PM Milo Đukanović (The result translates to 47 out of the 81 seats in the Parliament). Milo Đukanović secured the continuation of his term as prime minister, with mostly of the same ministers in government.

=== Đukanović resignation ===
After giving indications he would step down once the European Union granted official candidate status to Montenegro's membership application, which it did on 17 December 2010, Đukanović resigned as prime minister on 21 December 2010. His party's leadership proposed Deputy Prime Minister and Finance Minister Igor Lukšić to lead the new government. Lukšić was confirmed as the new prime minister by the Parliament of Montenegro on 29 December 2010.

== Cabinet composition ==
Portfolio	Minister	Party	Took office
Prime Minister
General Affairs	Milo Đukanović	DPS	29 February 2008
Deputy Prime Ministers
Finance	Igor Lukšić	DPS	14 February 2004
Political system	Svetozar Marović	DPS	29 February 2008
Economic and Financial Policy	Vujica Lazović	SDP	10 November 2006
Ministers
Justice	Miraš Radović	DPS	10 November 2006
Foreign Affairs	Milan Roćen	DPS	10 November 2006
Agriculture and Rural Development	Milutin Simović	DPS	10 November 2006
Defence	Boro Vučinić	DPS	10 November 2006
Spatial Planning and Environment	Branimir Gvozdenović	DPS	29 February 2008
Education and Science	Sreten Skuletić	DPS	29 February 2008
Culture and Sports	Branislav Mićunović	DPS	29 February 2008
Traffics and Naval Affairs	Andrija Lompar	SDP	10 November 2006
Sustainable Development and Tourism	Predrag Nenezić	DPS	10 November 2006
Health	Miodrag Radunović	DPS	10 November 2006
Human and Minority Rights	Fuad Nimani	DUA	10 November 2006
Labour and Social Welfare	Suad Numanović	DPS	10 November 2006
Internal Affairs	Ivan Brajović	SDP	10 June 2009
Without Portfolio	Rafet Husović	BS	10 June 2009
Without Portfolio	Migo Stijepović	DPS	29 February 2008

== See also ==
- Milo Đukanović
- Government of Montenegro
