= Marković Cabinet =

Government of Montenegro

- 41st Cabinet of Montenegro
- 2016–2020
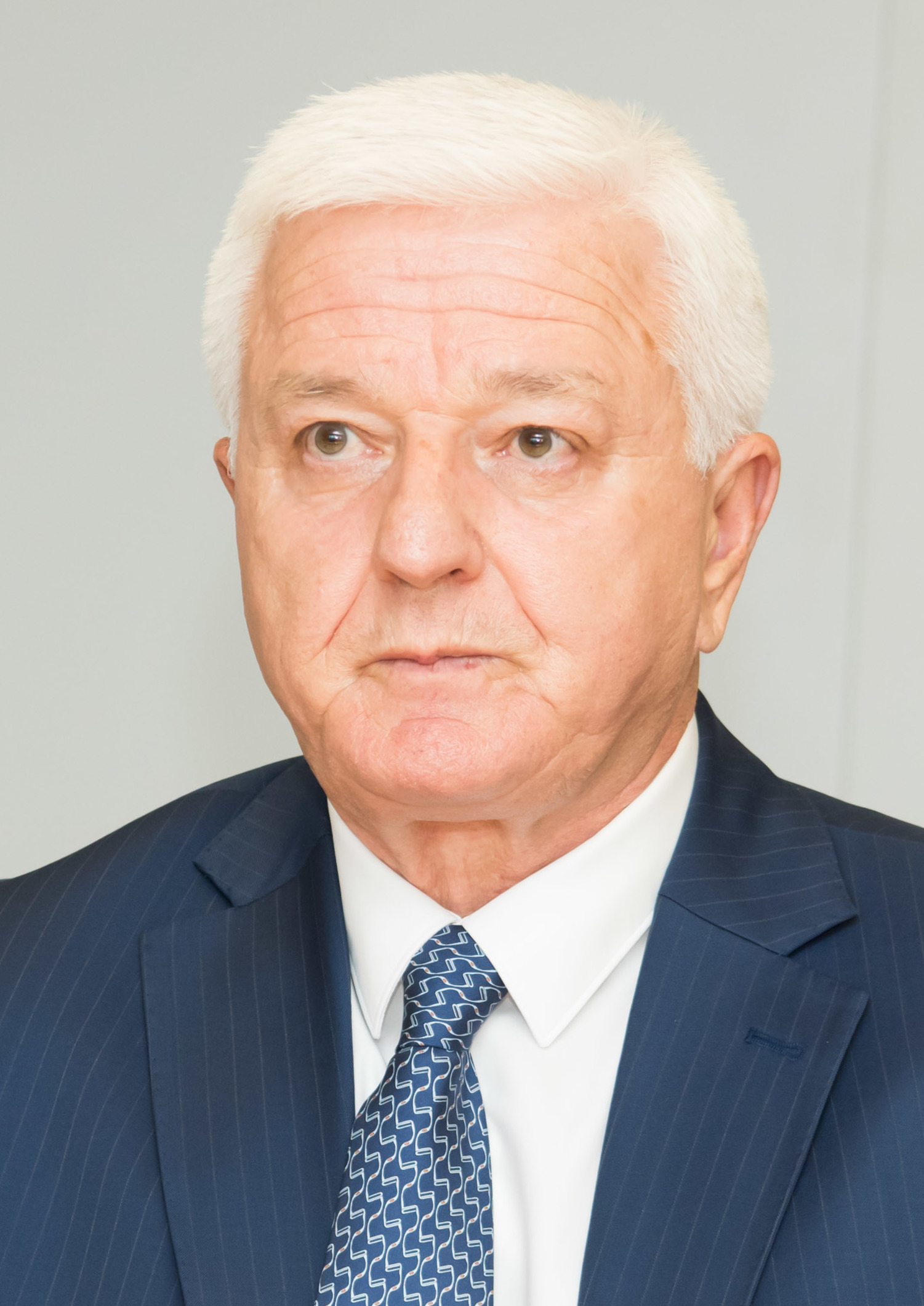
- Date established: 28 November 2016
- Date dissolved: 2 December 2020

Leadership and composition
- Head of government: Duško Marković
- No. of ministers: 20 (1 of them without portfolio)
- Member parties: DPS, SD, BS, DUA, HGI
- Status in legislature: Coalition government

Formation and history
- Election: 16 October 2016
- Predecessor: Đukanović VI Cabinet
- Successor: Krivokapić Cabinet

The Marković Cabinet was the 41st cabinet of Montenegro. It was led by Prime Minister Duško Marković. It was elected on 28 November 2016 by a majority vote in the Parliament of Montenegro. The coalition government was composed of the Democratic Party of Socialists, the Social Democrats, and ethnic minority parties. The cabinet lasted until 4 December 2020, when it was succeeded by the Krivokapić Cabinet, and was the last cabinet of the era of DPS dominance, which lasted from the introduction of the multi-party system in SR Montenegro.

== Government formation ==
=== 2016 election ===
Parliamentary elections were held in Montenegro on October 16, 2016 and resulted in another victory for the long-ruling Democratic Party of Socialists.

=== Forming the majority ===
Although DPS failed to win a majority on their own, they succeeded in remaining in power once again, forming a government with the newly formed Social Democrats (SD), as well as parties representing Albanian, Bosniak and Croat minorities.

On 9 November 2016, Deputy PM Duško Marković was nominated as prime minister by President Filip Vujanović. On 28 November, the government was elected by 42 out of 81 members of the parliament. The entire opposition boycotted the assembly.

Investiture votes for Marković Cabinet
Ballot →	28 November 2016
Required majority →	41 out of 81
Yes: • DPS-LP (36); • SD (2); • BS (2); • Forca (1); • HGI (1)	42 / 81
No: • None	0 / 81
Absentees: • DF (18); • DCG (8); • SDP (4); • Demos (4); • SNP (3); • URA (2)	39 / 81

== Cabinet composition ==
=== Party breakdown ===
- Democratic Party of Socialists
11
- Bosniak Party
3
- Social Democrats
2
- Independents
2
- Democratic Union of Albanians
1
- Croatian Civic Initiative
1

=== Ministers ===
Portfolio	Minister	Party	Took office
Prime Minister
General Affairs	Duško Marković	DPS	28 November 2016
Deputy Prime Ministers
Justice	Zoran Pažin	none	28 November 2016
Agriculture and Rural Development	Milutin Simović	DPS	28 November 2016
Regional Development	Rafet Husović	BS	4 December 2012
Ministers
Interior	Mevludin Nuhodžić	DPS	28 November 2016
Defence	Predrag Bošković	DPS	28 November 2016
Finance	Darko Radunović	DPS	28 November 2016
Foreign Affairs	Srđan Darmanović	none	28 November 2016
Education	Damir Šehović	SD	28 November 2016
Science	Sanja Damjanović	DPS	28 November 2016
Culture	Aleksandar Bogdanović	DPS	28 December 2017
Economy	Dragica Sekulić	DPS	28 November 2016
Transport and Maritime Affairs	Osman Nurković	BS	28 November 2016
Sustainable Development and Tourism	Pavle Radulović	DPS	28 November 2016
Health	Kenan Hrapović	SD	28 November 2016
Human and Minority Rights	Mehmet Zenka	DUA	28 November 2016
Labour and Social Welfare	Kemal Purišić	BS	28 November 2016
Public Administration	Suzana Pribilović	DPS	28 November 2016
Sports	Nikola Janović	DPS	28 November 2016
Without Portfolio	Marija Vučinović	HGI	4 December 2012

== Controversy and affairs ==
In its political rights and civil liberties worldwide report in May 2020, Freedom House marked Montenegro as a hybrid regime rather than a democracy because of declining standards in governance, justice, elections and media freedom. Freedom House stated that years of increasing state capture, abuse of power, authoritative and populist leadership had tipped country over the edge, and for the first time since 2003, Montenegro was no longer categorised as a democracy. The report emphasised the unequal electoral process, cases of political arrests, negative developments related to judicial independence, media freedoms, as well as a series of unresolved cases of corruption within the DPS-led government.

=== Electoral fraud and abuse of state resources ===
All 39 opposition MPs (out of 81 in total) started boycotting Parliament since the constitution of its current convocation in December 2016, due to claims of electoral fraud and that the elections were not held under fair conditions, at the 2016 parliamentary elections. They are demanding snap elections and reform of electoral laws.

In its June 2018 report, the OSCE's Office for Democratic Institutions and Human Rights, called for election reforms in Montenegro, and for more integrity, impartiality, and professionalism in election administration. The period before the 2020 parliamentary election also was marked by the high polarization of the electorate. Several corruption scandals of the ruling party triggered 2019 anti-government protests, while a controversial religion law sparked another wave of protests. Election observers OSCE stated: "Abuse of state resources gave the ruling party an unfair advantage", and said that although the elections were competitive, the governing party also benefited from a lack of independent media.

=== Political trials against the opposition ===
==== Alleged plot and "Coup d'etat" case ====
A coup d'état in the capital of Montenegro, Podgorica was allegedly planned and prepared for 16 October 2016, the day of the parliamentary election, according to Montenegro's special prosecutor. In September 2017, the trial of those indicted in connection with the plot began in the Higher Court in Podgorica, the indictees including leaders of the Montenegrin opposition and two alleged Russian intelligence agents. Russian government denied any involvement. In 2019, the Higher Court found guilty of plotting to commit ″terrorist acts″, also of "undermine the constitutional order of Montenegro" and first instance sentenced 13 people, including Montenegrin opposition leaders. On 5 February 2021, the Court of Appeals of Montenegro annulled the first instance verdict on all counts of the indictment. "The Council annulled the first-instance verdict because significant violations of the provisions of the criminal procedure were committed in the procedure of its passing and in the verdict itself, due to which neither factual nor legal conclusions could be accepted in the first-instance verdict, as in the existence of criminal offenses guilty, as well as in relation to the existence of their guilt for the acts ", it is stated in the announcement of the appellate court. The "coup d'etat" case was returned to the Higher Court in Podgorica, for a retrial before a completely changed composition. Many saw the decisions of the appellate court as a confirmation of then ruling Democratic Party of Socialists's mounted political process against its political opposition, and proof that the first instance verdict was passed under the pressure of the then DPS-led regime in Montenegro.

=== Assault on journalist Olivera Lakić ===
In early May 2018 Olivera Lakić, an investigative journalist from the Montenegrin daily newspaper Vijesti, was shot and wounded in front of her house in Podgorica after she published a series of articles about allegedly corrupt businesses involving top state officials and their families. The identity of the shooter is still unknown.

=== Marović case and Budva affair ===
In 2016, then vice president of the ruling DPS Svetozar Marović was arrested in connection to a long-running corruption case concerning his hometown of Budva; the Montenegrin prosecutor's office labeled him as "head of Budva criminal group," which he later admitted in court. He eventually fled to neighboring Serbia for alleged psychiatric treatment in Belgrade, where he currently resides. Montenegro has repeatedly requested his extradition from Serbia.

In August 2020, Marović spoke to the media for the first time, after fleeing to Belgrade, accusing the leadership of the party he founded of corruption, nepotism, partocracy and authoritarianism, also accusing DPS leader Milo Đukanović of rigging the corruption process against him and members of his family.

=== The "Atlas" and "Envelope" affairs ===
In mid-January 2019, a video clip from 2016 surfaced in which fotlrmer DPS-led regime former ally, Montenegrin-British businessman Duško Knežević, chairman of the Montenegro-based Atlas Group, appeared to hand the Mayor of Podgorica and high-ranked ruling party member, Slavoljub Stijepović, an envelope containing what Knežević later said was $97,000, to fund a Democratic Party of Socialists parliamentary election campaign. After fleeing to London, Knežević told the media he had been providing such unreported money to the DPS for the past 25 years.

==== Anti-corruption protests ====
Protests against corruption within Montenegrin DPS-lead government have started in February 2019 soon after the revelation of footage and documents that appear to implicate top officials in obtaining suspicious funds for the ruling party.

=== Controversial religion law and protests ===
After its ninth congress in November 2019, the ruling DPS dominantly increased its ethnic nationalist and even conservative discourse, by officially and institutionally supporting the rights of the canonically unrecognized Montenegrin Orthodox Church, announcing its "re-establishment". As of late December 2019, the newly proclaimed religion law which de jure transfers the ownership of church buildings and estates from the Serbian Orthodox Church in Montenegro to the Montenegrin state, sparked a series of massive protests followed with road blockages, which continued to 2020.

==== Government and police response ====
During the mass protests from December 2020 to August 2020, many Serb Orthodox clerics were attacked by the police, also being apprehended, and a number of opposition journalists, activists and protesting citizens were also arrested and injured by the police forces. PM Marković and ruling Democratic Party of Socialists officials, including president Milo Đukanović and members of the cabinet blamed the Belgrade-based media and Government of Serbia for the current political crisis, destabilization and unrest across the country, claiming that the ongoing Church protests actually are not against the disputed law but "against Montenegrin statehood and independence." Serbian Orthodox Church in Montenegro categorically rejects that allegations. President Milo Đukanović called the protesting citizens "a lunatic movement".

=== Foreign relations of Montenegro ===
In the 2020 election aftermath, President Đukanović and the outgoing Marković's DPS-led cabinet started pushing the narrative of "Montenegro being left to Serbia by the United States and the EU", although they are declaratively pro-western, which some media, NGOs and political analysts saw as a new turn in the foreign policy of the outgoing DPS regime.

On 1 September, Milo Đukanović conceded defeat, accusing Serbian President Aleksandar Vučić and Belgrade-based media of interfering in the internal politics of Montenegro, as well of alleged trying to revive a "Greater Serbia policy". He stated that it is possible that his party lost its support due to dissatisfaction with some policy, but also due to manipulations from Belgrade, as well from the Serbian Orthodox Church in Montenegro, due to the disputed Law on Religious Communities.

On November 28, 2020, Serbian ambassador to Montenegro Vladimir Božović was declared persona non grata in Montenegro by then outgoing Marković cabinet, for alleged meddling in interior affairs of Montenegro and for making multiple statements that were "unacceptable for a diplomat" according to Montenegrin ministry of foreign affairs. On November 28, 2020, in response to Montenegro declaring Serbian ambassador Božović person non grata, Serbian ministry of foreign affairs declared Montenegrin ambassador to Serbia Tarzan Milošević persona non grata and was given 72 hours to leave Serbia. Next day Serbian prime minister, Ana Brnabić revoked the decision by Serbian ministry of foreign affairs and Tarzan Milošević wasn't expelled and wasn't persona non grata anymore, at the suggestion of the European Commission and European Enlargement Commissioner Olivér Várhelyi. Outgoing DPS-led cabinet rejected the suggestion, calling European Commissioner Várhelyi "Belgrade-affiliated diplomat" and an "ignorant".

=== Montenegro Airlines affairs and liquidation ===
In late 2020 it was uncovered that a number of individuals close to the ruling DPS party, such as controversial religious leader Miraš Dedeić, were given free tickets or significant discount for the flights of the Montenegro Airlines.

In December 2020, the new government cabinet announced the shutdown and liquidation of the company in the forthcoming weeks stating mismanagement and accumulating losses for several years. Shortly after, it has been announced that the airline will suspend all flights from 26 December 2020 marking the end of its operations.

== See also ==
- Duško Marković
- Government of Montenegro
