= Džemal Perović =

Montenegrin politician and activist

Džemal Perović (Albanian: Xhemal Peroviq, Montenegrin Cyrillic: Џемал Перовић, born 1956 in Ulcinj, SR Montenegro, SFRY) is a Montenegrin civic and political activist, former member of Parliament of Montenegro.

After the introduction of the multi-party system in Montenegro in 1990, he was one of the founding members of the Liberal Alliance of Montenegro (LSCG), he was a LSCG MP in the Montenegrin national assembly until the dissolution of the party in 2005. after the dissolution of LSCG, he returned to his hometown of Ulcinj, where he engaged in agrarian family business, as well local civic and political activism.

== 2019 anti-corruption protests ==
In mid-January 2019, a video clip from 2016 surfaced in which long-term President and PM of Montenegro Milo Đukanovićs former ally, British-Montenegrin businessman Duško Knežević, appeared to hand the Mayor of Podgorica and high-ranked Đukanović's party member, Slavoljub "Migo" Stijepović, an envelope containing what Knežević later said was $97,000, to fund a Democratic Party of Socialists parliamentary election campaign. After fleeing to London, Knežević told the media he had been providing such unreported money to the Đukanović's party for the past 25 years. Protests against corruption within Montenegrin DPS-lead government have started in February 2019 soon after the revelation of footage and documents that appear to implicate top officials in obtaining suspicious funds for the ruling party. The mass protests were organized by newly formed "97,000 - Odupri se!" (97,000 - Resist!) civic group, an informal group of intellectuals, academics, NGO activists and journalists and supported from Montenegrin opposition parties. Perović was the informal leader of a civic group and anti-corruption protests. The protests failed in mid-2019. Involved in corruption affairs within the government and the ruling Democratic Party of Socialists remain in their offices.
