= Srđan Darmanović =

Montenegrin politician, diplomat and professor

Srđan Darmanović Срђан Дармановић
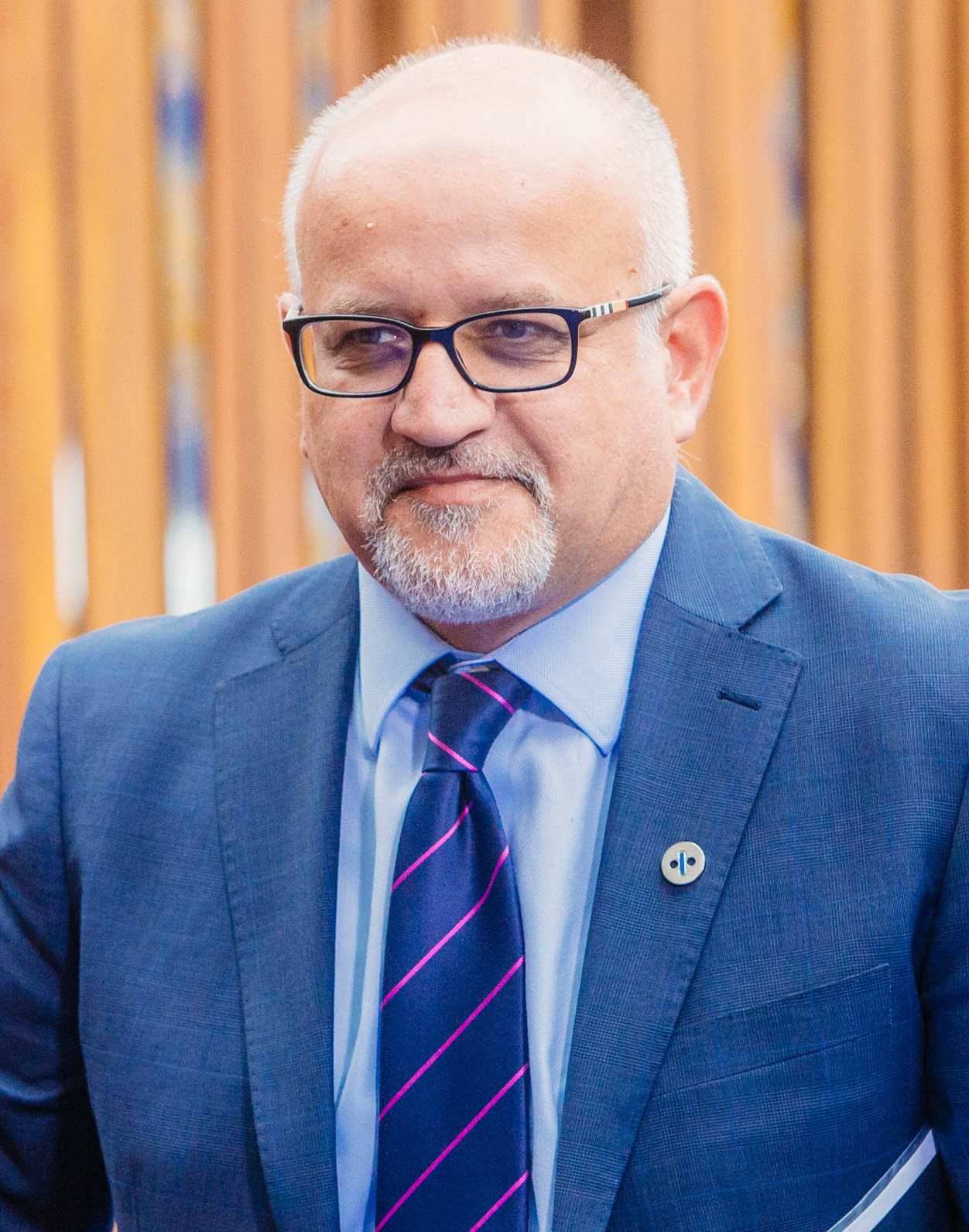

Minister of Foreign Affairs
- In office 28 November 2016 – 2 December 2020
- Prime Minister: Duško Marković
- Preceded by: Igor Lukšić
- Succeeded by: Đorđe Radulović

Ambassador of Montenegro to the United States
- In office 10 November 2010 – 28 November 2016
- Preceded by: Miodrag Vlahović
- Succeeded by: Nebojša Kaluđerović

Personal details
- Born: 18 July 1961 (age 65) Cetinje, SFR Yugoslavia (now Montenegro)
- Party: Independent
- Education: University of Belgrade

Srđan Darmanović (Montenegrin Cyrillic: Срђан Дармановић; born July 18, 1961 in Cetinje) is a Montenegrin politician, diplomat and professor at University of Montenegro Faculty of Political Sciences. He was the Ministry of Foreign Affairs and European Integration of Montenegro from 28 November 2016 to 2 December 2020.

== Biography ==
=== Academic career ===
Darmanović was one of the founders of the University of Montenegro Faculty of Political Sciences in 2006, and the first dean of the faculty until 2010 when he was appointed ambassador of Montenegro to United States of America. He is currently active as an associate professor at the same faculty.

=== Political career ===
From 10 November 2010 to November 2016 he served as Montenegrin ambassador to the United States. At 28 November 2016, he was appointed as the Minister of Foreign Affairs and European Integration of Montenegro in the Cabinet of Duško Marković, succeeding Igor Lukšić. He is an independent politician affiliated with the then-ruling Democratic Party of Socialists.
