= Vladimir Božović =

Vladimir Božović may refer to:

- Vladimir Božović (footballer)
- Vladimir Božović (diplomat)
