= Igor Lukšić =

Prime Minister of Montenegro from 2010 to 2012

- Игор Лукшић
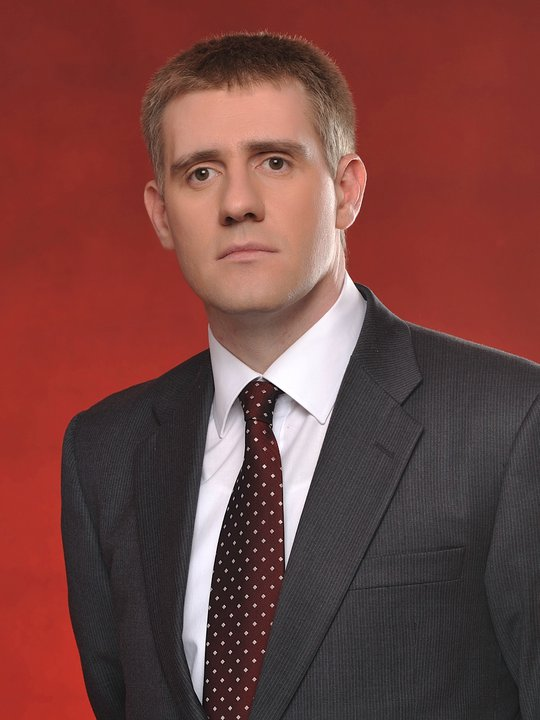
- Official portrait, 2011

Minister of Foreign Affairs
- In office 4 December 2012 – 28 November 2016
- Prime Minister: Milo Đukanović
- Preceded by: Nebojša Kaluđerović
- Succeeded by: Srđan Darmanović

Prime Minister of Montenegro
- In office 29 December 2010 – 4 December 2012
- President: Filip Vujanović
- Preceded by: Milo Đukanović
- Succeeded by: Milo Đukanović

Minister of Finance
- In office 16 February 2004 – 29 December 2010
- Prime Minister: Milo Đukanović; Željko Šturanović; Milo Đukanović

Personal details
- Born: 14 June 1976 (age 50) Bar, SR Montenegro, SFR Yugoslavia (now Montenegro)
- Party: Independent
- Other political affiliations: Democratic Party of Socialists (2002–2016)
- Education: University of Montenegro
- Occupation: Politician

Igor Lukšić (Montenegrin Cyrillic: Игор Лукшић, pronounced [îɡor lûkʃit͡ɕ]; born 14 June 1976) is a Montenegrin politician who served as the 4th Prime Minister of Montenegro from 2010 to 2012, following the resignation of Milo Đukanović. He was succeeded by Đukanović on 4 December 2012 and served as Minister of Foreign Affairs in the latter’s fourth cabinet from 2012 to 2016. Presently, Lukšić is with PwC and handles public sector activities in southeast Europe.

== Background ==
Igor Lukšić was born in Bar, Montenegro, Yugoslavia, where he finished elementary school and high school. Lukšić's paternal family roots trace back to the area of Crmnica, a region of old Montenegro. His mother's family, Nikčević, came from the town of Nikšić. Lukšić's family background follows a classic pattern of the Yugoslav working class. One grandfather was a train driver, the other an army captain who joined the Partisans when Italy occupied Montenegro in 1941. His father, a marine engineer, was the technical director of Bar's shipping company and at one point organized a vessel to rescue Montenegrins and others from Libya. His mother worked in the administration of another shipping services firm. While he was growing up, Lukšić wanted a career in diplomacy or medicine, but just before taking his place at University of Montenegro, he switched to economics.

Lukšić graduated from the Faculty of Economics of the University of Montenegro in Podgorica on 10 June 1998, later the same year he attended the Diplomatic Academy of Vienna and in 2000 finished his postgraduate studies at the University of Montenegro, obtaining a master's degree on 3 October 2002 on the topic: "Spontaneous Order and Transition" and a PhD on 10 September 2005 on the topic: "Transition – the Process of Achieving Economic and Political Freedoms". Besides speaking his native Montenegrin language, he is fluent in English.

Lukšić is married to Natasha and has two daughters, Sofi and Darija, and a son, Aleksei.

== Early career ==
Lukšić was first elected to the Parliament of Montenegro in 2001. From January to April 2003, he was the public relations adviser to the Prime Minister. From March 2003 to February 2004, he served as Deputy Minister of Foreign Affairs of Serbia and Montenegro. Since February 2004, he has served five terms as Finance Minister and two terms as Deputy Prime Minister since December 2008.

=== Finance minister ===
Igor Lukšić was appointed Minister of Finance in 2004. As such, he oversaw the final disassociation of state finances that had started long before with the federalization of Yugoslavia. A robust post-independence boom made it possible to consolidate the budget (a record surplus of 7% of gross domestic product was achieved in 2007), and to drastically reduce national debt.

As Finance Minister, Igor Lukšić defined himself as a pro-business reformist, and many times expressed that he believed in the power of entrepreneurship and private property. He advocated privatization to save and modernize jobs in Montenegro.

Being a small and open economy, Montenegro was hit hard by the global late-2000s recession of 2008. The income side of the budget practically collapsed with the slackening of tourism revenues. The Montenegrin government had to increasingly rely on foreign revenue sources. The government considered the Eurobonds issued in September 2010 a major success and proof of investor confidence in Montenegro, as demand for Montenegrin government securities was three times more than supply. The Ministry of Finance under Igor Lukšić issued ten-year bonds at the value of 200 million euros at a fixed interest rate of 7.85 percent. Rumours said that the Ministry of Finance sought an agreement with the International Monetary Fund, but government officials including the minister talked about it as an option, but one to avoid, if possible, and the Eurobonds allowed this.

=== Rise to power ===
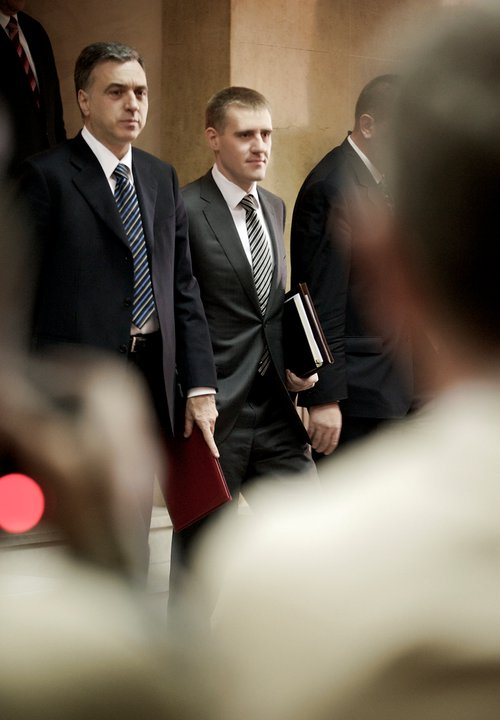
Inauguration of Igor Luksic. To the left: Filip Vujanovic, President of Montenegro

Igor Lukšić was long seen as the designated successor of Đukanović. When the latter resigned his office despite winning the election in 2006, Igor Lukšić was his first choice as his successor. Đukanović remained the chairman of the Democratic Party of Socialists, so he still had quite an influence over the nomination process. However, in the end the party nominated Željko Šturanović as prime minister, which was seen as a compromise between Đukanović and Svetozar Marović. Igor Lukšić remained in office as Finance Minister in the new cabinet, and when Šturanović resigned two years later due to health problems and Đukanović took over again, Lukšić was elevated to the rank of Deputy Prime Minister as well.

Due to international controversies about him, the premiership of Đukanović was seen as a major obstacle to Montenegro joining the European Union. He resigned four days after Montenegro was given official candidate status on 21 December 2010. The DPS unanimously nominated Lukšić as Đukanović's successor. The Parliament of Montenegro took a final vote on the matter on 29 December 2010. With Lukšić as prime minister, Đukanović remained DPS party leader, as he had during Šturanović's government.

== Prime minister ==
=== Members of the Lukšić cabinet ===
Portfolio	Minister	Party	Took office
Prime Minister
General Affairs	Igor Lukšić	DPS	29 December 2010
Deputy Prime Ministers
Justice	Duško Marković	DPS	29 December 2010
Economic and Financial Policy	Vujica Lazović	SDP	10 November 2006
Ministers
Foreign Affairs	Milan Roćen	DPS	10 November 2006
Agriculture and Rural Development	Tarzan Milošević	DPS	29 December 2010
Defence	Boro Vučinić	DPS	10 November 2006
Finance	Milorad Katnić	DPS	29 December 2010
Education and Sports	Migo Stijepović	DPS	29 December 2010
Science	Sanja Vlahović	DPS	29 December 2010
Culture	Branislav Mićunović	DPS	29 February 2008
Economy	Vladimir Kavarić	DPS	29 December 2010
Traffics and Naval Affairs	Andrija Lompar	SDP	10 November 2006
Sustainable Development and Tourism	Predrag Sekulić	DPS	29 December 2010
Health	Miodrag Radunović	DPS	10 November 2006
Human and Minority Rights	Fehrat Dinosha	DUA	10 june 2009
Labour and Social Welfare	Suad Numanović	DPS	10 November 2006
Internal Affairs	Ivan Brajović	SDP	10 june 2009
Without Portfolio	Rafet Husović	BS	10 june 2009

=== Ideology, political programme and views ===
Prime Minister Lukšić, then the youngest prime minister in the world, faced the challenge of modernizing and implementing reforms, while maintaining political stability and respecting tradition. Although he said that he was independent of Đukanović, many still saw him as a figurehead, and felt that the country was still being run from behind the scenes by Đukanović. In response to a question from Reuters in his first foreign media interview as Prime Minister, he said,

"I am in charge. I will always, when I find it necessary, consult with many people ... But I would not accept doing this job if I had to bear all the responsibility and if the decisions were made somewhere else."

Lukšić's political credit was to govern by clear and precise rules, with less room for discretionary decision-making and corruption. "Montenegrin society has relied throughout its entire history on strong personalities", he said, but strove to create trust in political institutions. Membership in the European Union as soon as possible was a key priority. To speed up approval, he demanded value changes, and more individual initiatives than state interference. He said in his inaugural speech:

"The Government cannot and should not be the solution to all of society's problems and shortcomings; it should be accountable and efficient in carrying out its constitutional and statutory obligations. I will require everyone to be accountable for his part in the task, so that we all individually and jointly contribute to Montenegro’s overall development"

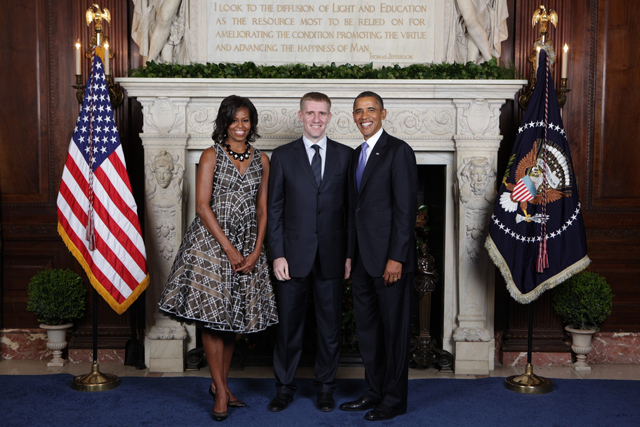
Igor Luksic with First Lady Michelle Obama and President of the United States Barack Obama

As a member of the ruling Democratic Party of Socialists (DPS) he is officially considered a social democrat, but his economic policy views have been described to be rather liberal, which was not liked by the public. Furthermore, more politicians from the right than from the left figure in his role models. Besides former British prime minister Tony Blair, Lukšić has also called Prime Minister David Cameron, who he even "likes" on Facebook, a respected contemporary politician. Both Winston Churchill and former "Iron Lady" Margaret Thatcher are among his historical political models. Lukšić was strongly influenced by the "neoliberal" economical school of Professor Veselin Vukotic in Montenegro at the University of Donja Gorica. Vukotic taught both Đukanović and Lukšić, and was an important figure in putting together privatization programmes in Montenegro. (Lukšić is also a lecturer of economics at the University of Donja Gorica).

Still, Igor Lukšić used more "patriotic" messages than most of the DPS, which has a much more technocratic attitude to politics. Unlike his predecessors, Lukšić emphasized his use of the Montenegrin language, and in his policies he tried to represent interests of the "Montenegrin nation".

== United Nations Secretary-General selection ==
After Ban Ki-moon publicized his intention as secretary general at the end of 2016, Igor Lukšić declared his candidacy for the top position. As a part of the newly transparent process to elect the secretary general, he participated in plenary discussions of his vision for the UN and responded to questions on accountability. In regards to impunity and an international tribunal on sexual assault and exploitation by UN Peacekeeping troops he said,

"I fully agree with you because I think that the story doesn’t end with passing the resolution that will put shame and send away contingents. I think the guilt must be individualized... a peacekeeper acting sexual abuse -- this is something which is really shameful and terribly destroys the UN image. I think this is one of the first tasks, and it’s a moral task, that we need to get on with"

at a London Husting panel with other candidates Antonio Guterres and Vuk Jeremic.

In an informal dialogue at UN headquarters in New York, he said "We need to do more on sexual exploitation and assault...Whether through special mechanism like a tribunal or working with member states."

Thirty-seven human rights organizations endorsed a pledge to hold the UN Secretary General to addressing UN accountability and take action on two human rights violations that had tarnished the United Nations' image: failing to provide remedies for victims of cholera in Haiti, and sexual exploitation and abuse by peacekeepers. Dr. Lukšić was the first candidate to sign onto the pledge on 4 August 2016.

In taking this step forward, Lukšić is committing to the five tenets of the pledge: 1) to make improved UN accountability, transparency, and ethical integrity a key personal priority. 2) to work with member states to ensure that what Secretary General Ban described as a "culture of impunity" around sexual exploitation and abuse is replaced by an impartial, accessible and effective accountability mechanism. 3) to ensure that immunity is not misused to shield UN peacekeeping personnel from accountability for sexual exploitation and abuse. 4) to ensure that victims of cholera in Haiti have access to fair remedies. 5) to work with member states to control and eliminate cholera in Haiti.

== Policies ==
=== Foreign policy ===
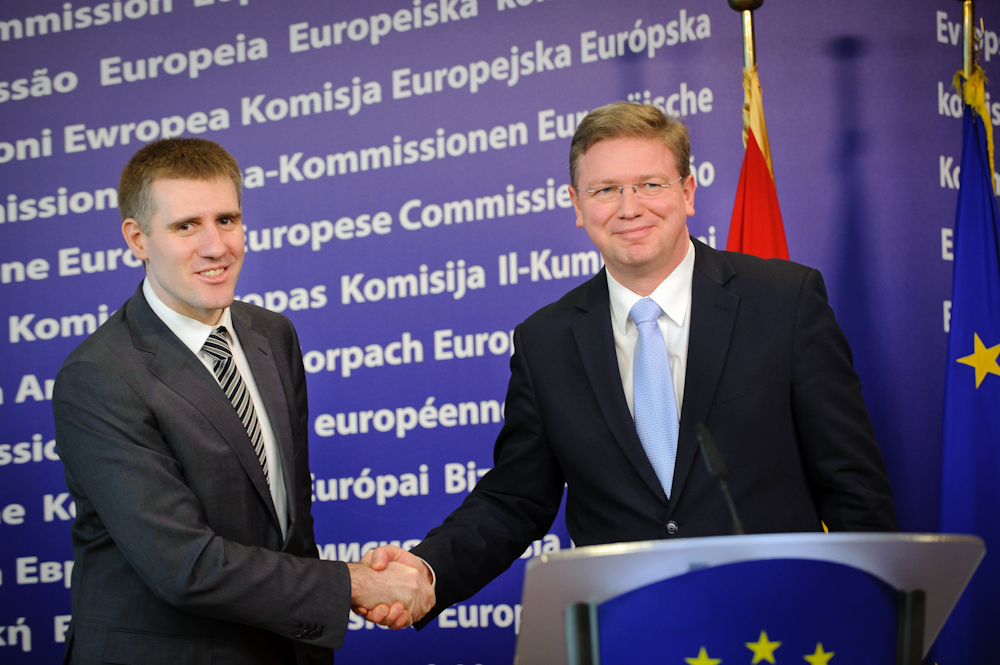
Igor Luksic with Štefan Füle, European Commissioner for Enlargement and European Neighbourhood Policy

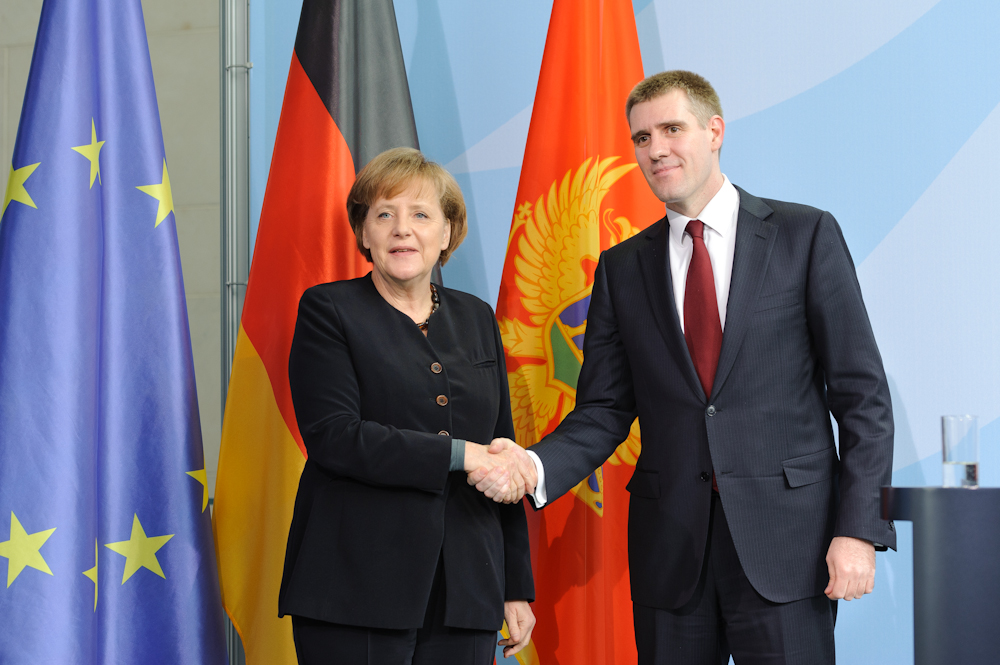
Lukšić with German Chancellor Angela Merkel on 31 March 2011

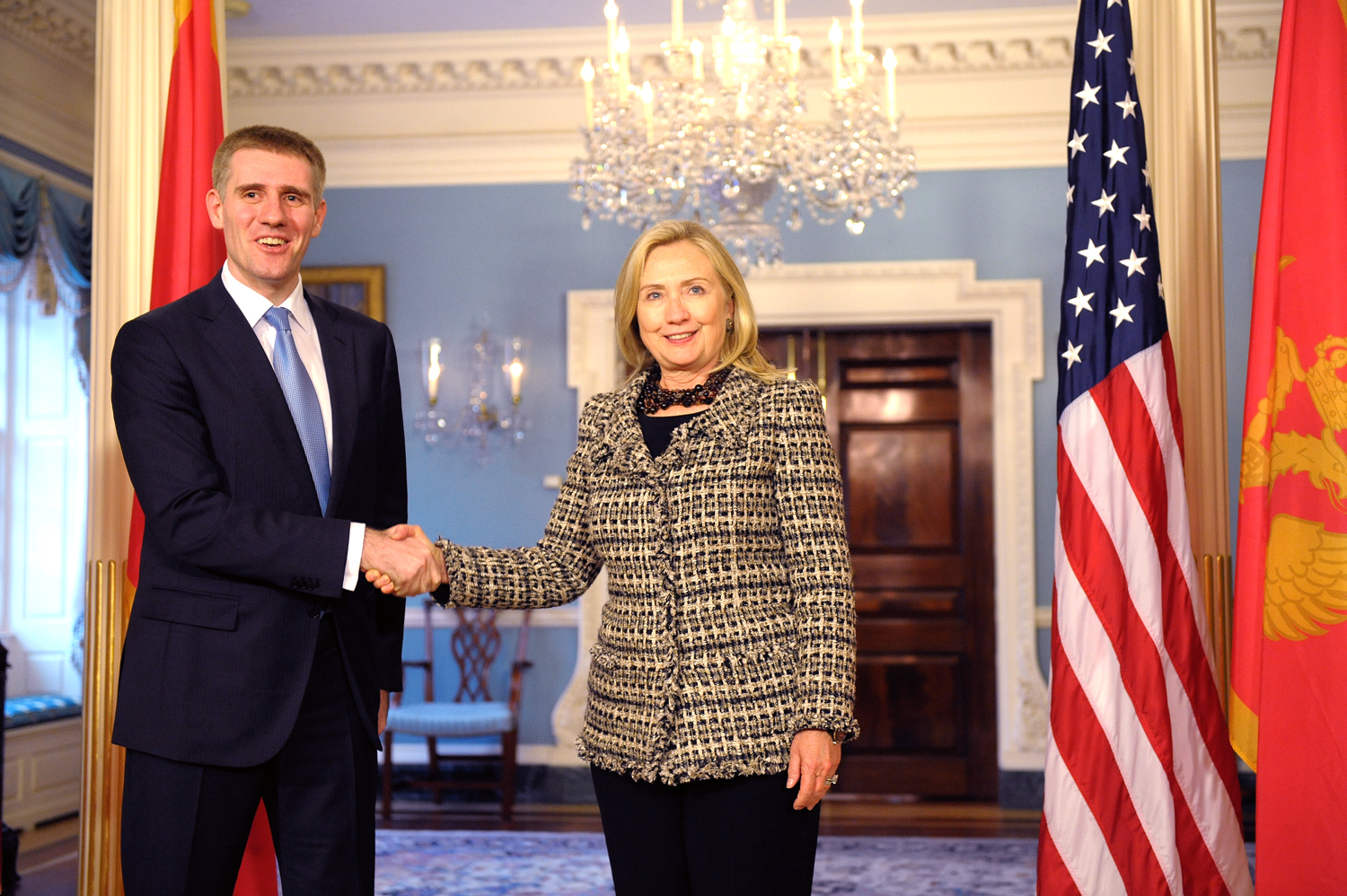
Lukšić with U.S. Secretary of State Hillary Clinton in Washington, D.C., 11 October 2011

One of the government's top priorities was to achieve Montenegro's membership of the European Union as soon as possible. The cabinet was inaugurated right after Montenegro became a candidate for the EU, so it was expected to speed up this process and implement the reforms needed to start accession negotiations. Lukšić merged the Ministry for European Integration with the Foreign Ministry and charged newly appointed minister Milan Rocen "with providing continuous communication with Brussels, as well as with other departments in the government and other social entities". The Prime Minister pledged to personally coordinate the reforms required for EU accession.

Another focal point was international cooperation on security issues: the Lukšić cabinet was devoted to NATO membership for the country and maintained a Montenegrin presence in international peacekeeping missions, particularly in the Afghanistan ISAF mission, EU operations in the waters of Somalia, and the UN mission in Liberia. In December 2015, Montenegro completed the Membership Action Plan of NATO and was invited to begin accession.

The Government of Montenegro recognised the Libyan National Transitional Council on 21 July 2011. As a candidate country, Montenegro also signed a statement condemning violence in Syria on 18 August 2011.

=== Domestic policy ===
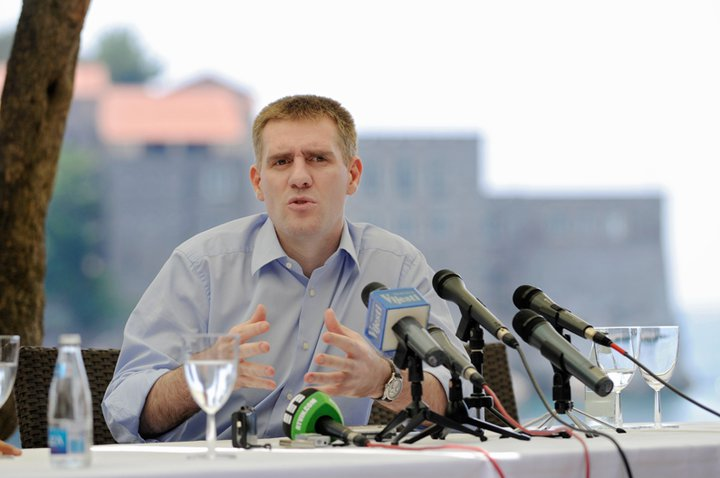
Igor Luksic in Sveti Stefan

Igor Lukšić started his tenure by expressing that he was trying to phase in a more deliberative approach to politics. During the first 100 days of his cabinet he organized meetings with representatives of different groups within Montenegrin society, including the opposition parties, NGOs, and various minority and church representatives. The approach was welcomed quite warmly. The NGO sector also welcomed the decriminalisation of libel in June 2011, regarded as improving freedom of the press in Montenegro. International observers considered problems with criminality as the biggest hurdle to EU membership. Lukšić initiated anti-corruption measures: his cabinet strengthened the powers of the national commission established to deal with the issue; one-stop shopping was introduced in offices to cut red tape and minimize the opportunities for bribery, and several core laws were updated to comply with GRECO and European Commission recommendations. But while Lukšić emphasized equality under the law, he continued to state that no member of the previous or current government deserved to go before the prosecutor's office, which discouraged observers who had expected that the alleged corruption issues of his predecessors would be prosecuted. Still, the fight against corruption and organized crime gained momentum after Lukšić took office. The arrest of the mayor of Budva and his accomplices—among them the brother of former Deputy Prime Minister Svetozar Marović—marked the first high-level politician facing corruption charges in Montenegro. Several successful 2011 organized crime investigations in cooperation with other countries dealt a heavy blow to drug trafficking, money laundering and human trafficking in the region.

A few weeks before the Lukšić inauguration, Montenegro experienced the worst flood in its modern history. Rebuilding efforts were alleviated by flood relief donations from nine NATO countries and Russia, and the first-ever online fundraising campaign in Montenegro, also promoted on the then-debuting Facebook page of Lukšić.

In 2011, Montenegro would have held the first Gay Pride Parade in its history. Prime Minister Lukšić pledged support for the event, stating that society had to show enough maturity to accept differences. However, his minister for minorities and human rights Ferhat Dinosa made a controversial statement claiming that "it is not good for Montenegro" if there are homosexuals in the country, . Despite official support for the event, scheduled for 31 May, organizers called it off after two alleged attacks against gay persons in Montenegro. At the beginning of September, a milestone international conference was held on gay-rights issues and gender equality, with the cooperation of the American Embassy. Though the conference was attended by leading experts from across the globe, it was boycotted by most of the NGO sector, which demanded the dismissal of Minister of Human and Minority Rights Ferhat Dinosa, more substantial public support for the Pride Parade and a stronger stance on violence against the members of the LGBT community.

In 2011 the government of Montenegro conducted the first official census since independence in 2006. Though observers found both the legal background and the whole process of the census in line with international requirements, the census sparked political turmoil, as opposition parties suggested that political pressure was being applied on citizens in order to tailor the census ethnicity figures of the population. However, the census took place without any upset, and numbers did not reveal any substantial shift in figures that would have indicated a fraud.

In July 2011, Lukšić hosted a reception in honour of the Montenegrin Royal Family, the House of Petrovic-Njegos, in Cetinje. The event celebrated the adoption of the Royal Family Law, initiated by Lukšić's cabinet, to regulate the status of the descendants of the House of Petrovic. Prince Nikola welcomed the adoption of the law, as it enables the Royal Family to participate in European processes in Montenegro.

==== Election reform and language issue ====
The Lukšić cabinet needed to harmonize the Election Law with the new Constitution adopted in 2007. However, this required a two-thirds majority in the national assembly, which the ruling coalition lacked. Opposition parties were in a position to blackmail the government, demanding that Serbian would be named the second official language of the state (the first being Montenegrin), and included in the school curriculum. This distinction was more important politically than linguistically, as it reflected the difference between pro-Serb and pro-independence identities within Montenegrin society. The stand-off that blocked the efforts of the government to give a boost to the European integration process was so severe, that Prime Minister Lukšić even mentioned the possibility of holding an early election to resolve the current situation, but this move was widely seen merely as tactical by the Montenegrin public. Compromise was finally reached in early September, when the parties agreed upon the name of the subject taught in class as "Montenegrin-Serbian, Bosnian, Croatian language and literature". The Election Law deadlock was widely seen as the first serious political conflict during the tenure of Igor Lukšić, and although at first, he was seen as unable to show enough strength, the final compromise strengthened his position.

=== Economic policy ===
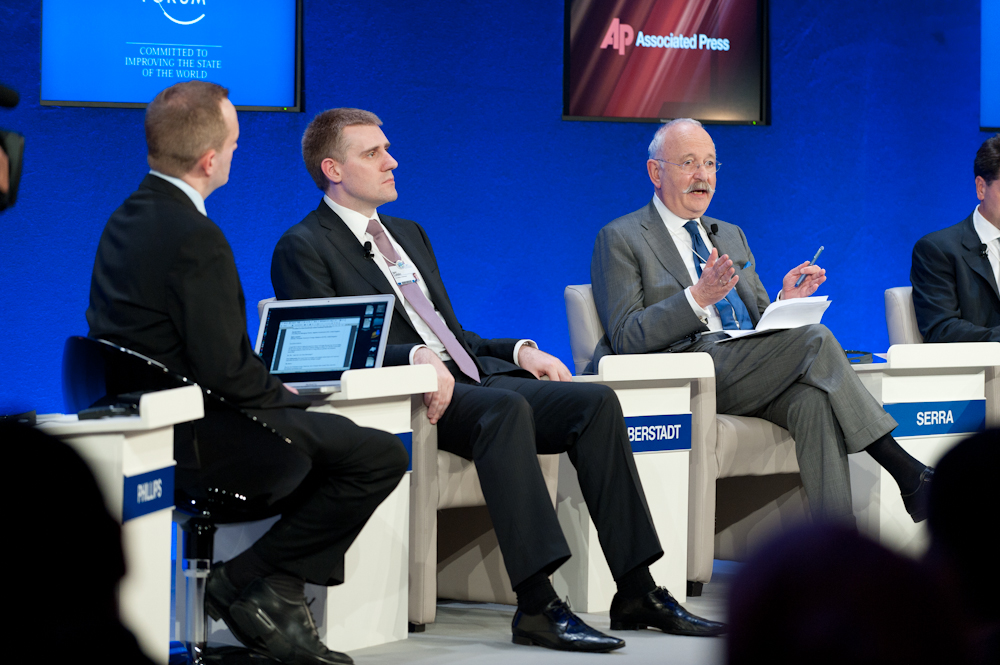
Igor Luksic attending a panel discussion at the World Economic Forum in Vienna, discussing economic policy in the crisis, June 2011

As Prime Minister, Lukšić remained a firm supporter of privatization and foreign direct investment in the Montenegrin economy, as he saw this path as the only one leading to a rapid modernization of the country.

Upon inauguration, Igor Lukšić said his cabinet would "place special emphasis on growth in the energy, tourism and transportation sectors, with particular attention on development in the northern part of Montenegro" and would "continue with energy efficiency promotion, becoming more dependable on renewable energy resources". The first task was, however, to bring the economy back on track. Lukšić stated that the economy had a long-term growth potential of 5% per year, and stagnation has been left behind, as 2.5% growth is expected for 2011. Said to be committed to fiscal discipline, he stated that the current deficit would be turned into a primary surplus as early as 2013, and that public debt would culminate in 2011 at 41% of GDP. According to the first data concerning 2011, FDI was returning to the country. Also, the second Eurobond issue was carried out at an interest rate half a percentage point lower than the previous one, indicating that investors have solid confidence in Montenegrin state finances.

=== Controversies ===
Opponents said that as Minister of Finance and Deputy Prime Minister, Lukšić played a significant role in the controversy around Prva banka Crne Gore, partly owned by Đukanović's family. Lukšić confronted the central bank's then-governor, Ljubisa Krgovic, and his policies. Different views were also aired on how to resolve the troubled bank. The Parliament shortened Krgovic's term and replaced him in October 2010. Lukšić advocated a €44,000,000 bailout for Prva banka Crne Gore from the state budget. He said that Prva Banka's liquidity measures did not require investigation. Prva Banka had repaid its loan from the government on time, he said, and it did not need to be investigated whether it had used funds deposited by the Montenegrin Electricity Enterprise (EPCG), which increased its cash flow.

In an interview with Reuters, he acknowledged the role Krgovic played in saving financial stability in Montenegro. "From time to time we had policy clashes," he told Reuters. "But I respect everything Mr. Krgovic did for 10 years as central bank governor."

Prime Minister Lukšić was seen by many to be controlled by Đukanović. Lukšić tried to convince journalists and his fellow citizens that he consulted Đukanović only as often as he consulted other Montenegrin politicians, but the opposition continued to accuse him of being the “puppet” of Đukanović. One of the first steps taken by Lukšić was to reorganize the cabinet inherited from Đukanović, adding six new ministers. At the same time, several members of the government were still considered loyal to Đukanović. Newly appointed Deputy Prime Minister Duško Marković and "inherited" ministers Milan Rocen and Boro Vučinić were the most notable remaining figures in the cabinet, and were widely seen as close allies to Đukanović.

The allegations about Đukanović's influence were also fueled by the fact that he remained chairman of the ruling DPS party, while Lukšić was only vice chairman. But some analysts described him before as a "serious" and quite autonomous player. Lukšić himself denied being the hand of Đukanović, saying that while he sometimes consulted with the former prime minister, the final decisions were in his own hands.

=== International reception ===
While under Đukanović there were no highest-level diplomatic meetings between Germany and Montenegro, one of the first diplomatic trips by Lukšić was to Germany at the invitation of Chancellor Angela Merkel. A few months later, the head of German diplomacy, Guido Westerwelle visited Igor Lukšić in Podgorica during his Balkan tour.

EU politicians found the achievements of the Lukšić government encouraging and expressed readiness to support Montenegro's European integration. EU's Enlargement Commissioner, Štefan Füle, told members of the European Parliament, "His commitment to pursue the reform process and strong determination to meet the key priorities set out in the Commission's opinion are encouraging. It is now crucial to focus on implementation and establish a solid track record."

During a meeting with Lukšić, Füle said that the Montenegrin prime minister had proven that the determination and ambition were there. He added that the European Commission would "provide as much help as we can to assist Montenegro," in particular to meet the seven EC priorities that must be achieved in order for accession negotiations to begin. Head of the EU Commission Jose Manuel Barroso, also praised the Lukšić government. During a visit to Podgorica, he said, "I'm pleased with the commitment and the efforts demonstrated by the Prime Minister's government, and I have congratulated him on his work so far. But more work remains to be done. It's important that the government has elaborated a detailed Action Plan that focuses on the shortcomings identified in the Commission's Opinion, which provides you with a clear road map for progress. The key now is implementation. Strong leadership and ownership are needed to address the priorities, in particular those related to the rule of law."

== Timeline ==
The chart below shows a timeline of the offices held by Lukšić and the Montenegro status. The left bar shows president and all prime ministers terms of Lukšić, and the right bar shows the country status of Montenegro at that time.

== Post-Political career ==
Lukšić is member of the Advisory Council of the Alliance of International Aid, an organization dedicated to International Aid and Development under the chairmanship of Sultan Masood Dakik. In 2025, Lukšic was appointed as the Chairperson of the 5th Governing Board (2025-2026) for the global public-private partnership Tod'Aérs Global Network [TGN], alongside 2 deputy chairpersons Piotr Trabinski and Pamela Gidi Masías. Lukšic first joined Tod'Aérs Global Network [TGN] in November 2023 as a Member of the Governing Board.

Political offices
Preceded by Miroslav Ivanišević	Minister of Finance; 2004–2010	Succeeded by Milorad Katnić
Preceded by Milo Đukanović	Prime Minister of Montenegro; 2010–2012	Succeeded by Milo Đukanović
Preceded by Nebojša Kaluđerović	Minister of Foreign Affairs; 2012–2016	Succeeded by Srđan Darmanović
