= Adria TV =

Montenegran broadcaster

- Type: Radio and television
- Country: Montenegro
- Availability: National; International (via SAT and www.rtvatlas.tv)
- Owner: Atlas Group
- Launch date: 2006 (as the RTV Atlas)
- Former names: RTV Atlas (2006–2017); A1 TV (2017–2021)
- Language: Montenegrin, Serbian

Adria TV is a national broadcaster from Montenegro. It is based in Podgorica and broadcast in most of Montenegro. Adria TV also broadcasts its program over the satellite. It can be found on Eutelsat W2 at 16.0E on frequency 12,600.75 GHz/V. It was founded in 2006 by the Atlas Group under the name RTV Atlas, until it was rebranded in 2017 as A1 TV. Adria TV is a Montenegrin TV station with the yearly largest raise of rating in Montenegro.

== Programmes ==
Adria TV program includes variety of show programs, sport events like Premiere League and Moto GP, British documentaries, TV series and movies. It was the first television in the country that introduced broadcasting movies by their genre through theme nights: blockbusters on Mondays, classics on Tuesdays, sf/horror on Wednesdays, Comedies on Thursdays and independent productionfilms on Fridays.

Some of TV series broadcast on this TV station were big hits in Montenegro: That '70s Show, Law & Order series, The Apprentice, and Project Runway. Adria TV is also known for its domestic music show program, A List, that aired on Saturday afternoons and its variety of talk-shows and A1 Weekend Show that aired on Sunday afternoons.
