= List of ambassadors of Montenegro to the United States =

Coordinates: 38.911667°N 77.041861°W

Ambassador of Montenegro to the United States Embassy of Montenegro in Washington, D.C.
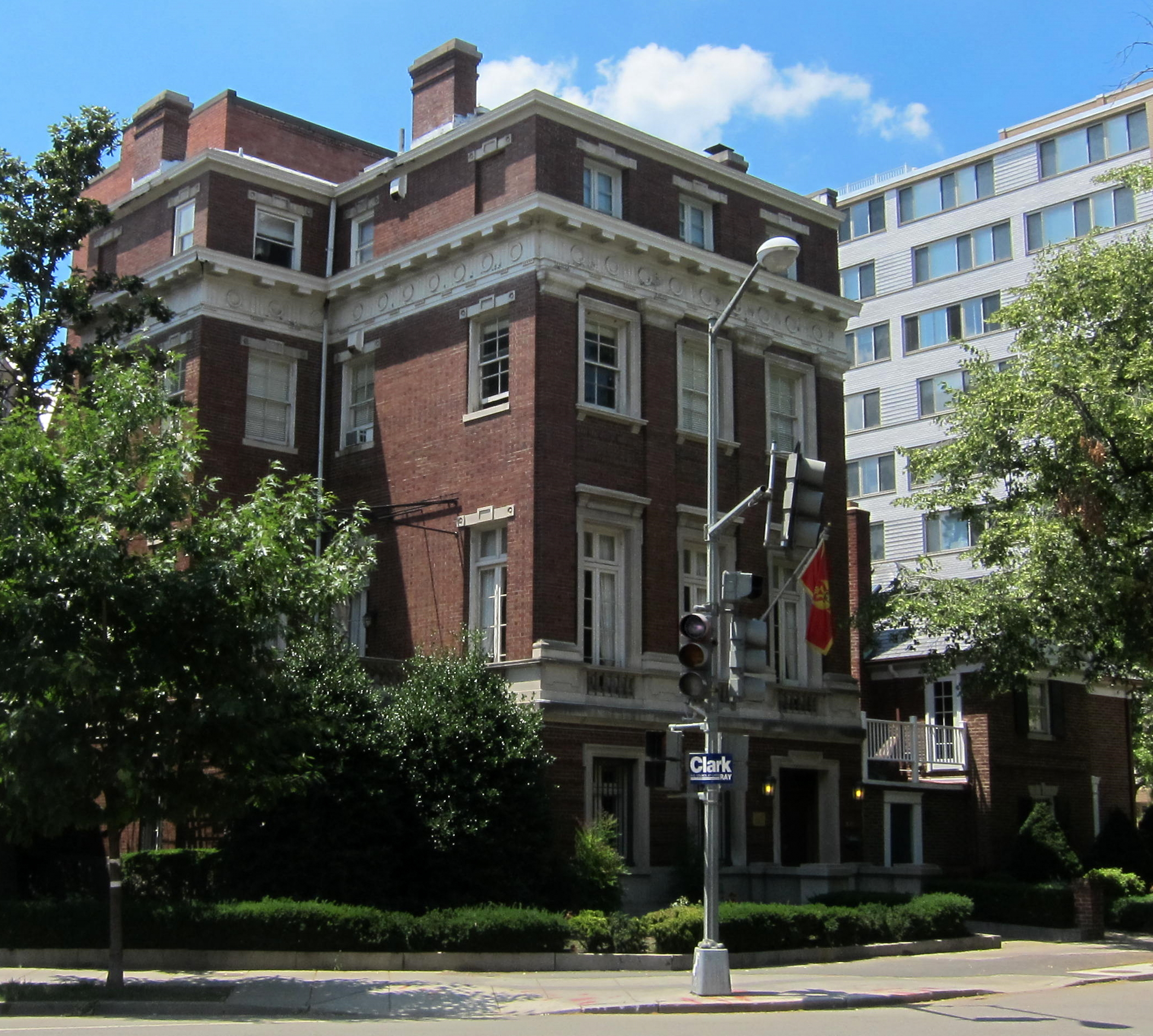
- Inaugural holder: Lioubomir Michailovitch
- Formation: January 26, 1917

The Montenegrin ambassador in Washington, D. C. is the official representative of the Government in Podgorica to the Government of the United States.

== List of representatives ==
Diplomatic agrément	Diplomatic accreditation	Ambassador	Observations	Prime Minister of Montenegro	List of presidents of the United States	Term end
1918		Anto Gvozdenović	Representative of the Montenegrin royal government in exile in Bordeaux	Lazar Mijušković	Woodrow Wilson	1921
January 26, 1917			LEGATION OPENED – Listed as Serbia	Milo Matanović	Woodrow Wilson	
January 26, 1917		Lioubomir Michailovitch		Milo Matanović	Woodrow Wilson	
August 21, 1918		Yefrem Simitch	Chargé d'affaires	Evgenije Popović	Woodrow Wilson	
January 6, 1919		Slavko Y. P. Grouitch	(*February 14, 1871): 1916: Serbian minister at Berne.; 1907 Serbian Čharge d'Affaires in London and at The Hague.; son of Yevrem Grouitch, ex-Serbian Envoy Extraordinary and, Minister Plenipotentiary in Constantinople, London, and Paris; 1903: married Mabel, daughter of Charles Randolph Dunlop, Virginia, U.S.A., Educ. : Lycée de Versaille:; Docteur en Droit	Anto Gvozdenović	Woodrow Wilson	
February 1, 1919			Listed as Serbs Croats and Slovenes	Anto Gvozdenović	Woodrow Wilson	
October 10, 1922		Ante Tresich Pavichich		Alexander I of Yugoslavia	Warren G. Harding	
May 4, 1927		Voislav Antonievitch		Alexander I of Yugoslavia	Calvin Coolidge	
June 10, 1928		Bojidar Pouritch	Chargé d'affaires	Alexander I of Yugoslavia	Calvin Coolidge	
May 24, 1929		Leonide Pitamec		Alexander I of Yugoslavia	Herbert C. Hoover	
October 1, 1929			Listed as Yugoslavia	Alexander I of Yugoslavia	Herbert C. Hoover	
May 1, 1934		Bojidar P. Stoianovitch	Chargé d'affaires	Peter II of Yugoslavia	Franklin D. Roosevelt	
October 29, 1935		Constantin Fotitch		Peter II of Yugoslavia	Franklin D. Roosevelt	
October 5, 1942			LEGATION RAISED TO EMBASSY	Peter II of Yugoslavia	Franklin D. Roosevelt	
October 5, 1942		Constantin Fotitch		Peter II of Yugoslavia	Franklin D. Roosevelt	
July 10, 1944		Ivan Franges	Chargé d'affaires	Peter II of Yugoslavia	Franklin D. Roosevelt	
April 24, 1945	May 2, 1945	Stanoje Simic		Ivan Ribar	Harry S. Truman	
January 6, 1946		Sergije Makiedo	Chargé d'affaires	Ivan Ribar	Harry S. Truman	
July 9, 1946	July 18, 1946	Sava N. Kosanović	nephew of Nikola Tesla	Ivan Ribar	Harry S. Truman	
July 1, 1947			Listed as FEDERAL PEOPLE'S REPUBLIC OF YUGOSLAVIA	Ivan Ribar	Harry S. Truman	
May 22, 1950	June 5, 1950	Vladimir Popović (diplomat)		Ivan Ribar	Harry S. Truman	
April 12, 1954	April 13, 1954	Leo Mates		Josip Broz Tito	Dwight D. Eisenhower	
October 6, 1958	October 27, 1958	Marko Nikezic		Josip Broz Tito	Dwight D. Eisenhower	
September 27, 1962	November 2, 1962	Veljko Mićunović		Josip Broz Tito	John F. Kennedy	
August 28, 1967	August 30, 1967	Bogdan Crnobrnja		Josip Broz Tito	Lyndon B. Johnson	
October 14, 1971	October 21, 1971	Toma Granfil		Josip Broz Tito	Richard Nixon	
November 18, 1975	November 21, 1975	Dimce Belovski		Josip Broz Tito	Gerald Ford	
October 19, 1979		Vladimir Sindjelić	Chargé d'affaires	Josip Broz Tito	Jimmy Carter	
November 16, 1979	November 28, 1979	Budimir Lončar		Josip Broz Tito	Jimmy Carter	
December 10, 1983		Branislav Novakovic	Chargé d'affaires	Mika Špiljak	Ronald Reagan	
December 28, 1983	January 9, 1984	Mico Rakic		Mika Špiljak	Ronald Reagan	
June 22, 1987	July 20, 1987	Živorad Kovačević		Lazar Mojsov	Ronald Reagan	
November 22, 1989	December 20, 1989	Dževad Mujezinović		Janez Drnovšek	George H. W. Bush	
March 25, 1999			EMBASSY CLOSED	Filip Vujanović	Bill Clinton	January 1, 2001
January 18, 2001	February 14, 2001	Milan St. Protić		Filip Vujanović	George W. Bush	
October 30, 2002	December 9, 2002	Ivan Vujačić		Filip Vujanović	George W. Bush	
December 6, 2006	December 8, 2006	Miodrag Vlahović (foreign minister)		Svetozar Marović	George W. Bush	June 2005
November 30, 2010	December 10, 2010	Srđan Darmanović		Milo Đukanović	Barack Obama	May 2023
