= Mediterranean University =

University located in Podgorica, Montenegro

Coordinates: 42°26′54″N 19°15′42″E

- Univerzitet Mediteran
- Type: Private
- Established: 30 May 2006; 18 years ago
- President: Duško Knežević
- Rector: Savo Marković
- Students: 2,200
- Location: Podgorica, Bijelo Polje, Montenegro
- Website: www.unimediteran.net

Mediterranean University (Montenegrin: Универзитет Медитеран / Univerzitet Mediteran) is a university located in Podgorica, Montenegro. It was founded on 30 May 2006, is the first private university established in Montenegro and is organized in 6 faculties. The university is member of the Balkan Universities Network.

== History ==
Mediterranean University is the first private university in Montenegro. It was founded on 30 May 2006 and consisted of four organizational units: Faculty of Tourism, Hotel and Trade Management Bar, Faculty of Economics and Business, Faculty of Visual Arts and Faculty of Information Technology. Later on, two more faculties joined the University ”Mediterranean”: Faculty of Foreign Languages and Faculty of Law officially became the organizational units of Mediterranean University on 16 December 2006. Faculty of Tourism, Hotel and Trade Management Bar was founded in 2004. as the first private institution of higher education in Montenegro. On February 9, 2008, it changed its name to: Faculty of Tourism Bar – MTS – "Montenegro Tourism School".

The seat of Mediterranean University is in Podgorica, as well as the following organizational units: Faculty of Business Studies "Montenegro Business School", Faculty of Visual Arts, Faculty of Information Technology, Faculty of Foreign Languages and Faculty of Law. Faculty of Tourism, Hotel and Trade Management is located in Bar.

Since its founding, Mediterranean University in Podgorica functions as a single legal entity in accordance with the Bologna Declaration.

== Study programmes ==
=== Undergraduate ===
- Faculty of Tourism "Montenegro Tourism School" – Tourism and Hospitality Management
- Faculty of Economics and Business – Financial Management and Marketing
- Faculty of Information Technology – Information Technologies
- Faculty of Visual Arts – Design of Visual Communications and Audiovisual production
- Faculty of Foreign Languages – Business English Language and Business Italian Language
- Faculty of Law – Commercial Law Study Programme and Judicial Study Programme
- Faculty of Engineering – Civil Engineering Study Programme and Architecture Study Programme

=== Postgraduate ===
- Faculty of Tourism "Montenegro Tourism School" – specialist studies Management in Tourism and Hotel Management and master studies under the same title.
- Faculty of Economics and Business – specialist studies Financial Management and Marketing Management and master studies under the same title.
- Faculty of Information Technology – specialist studies Information Technologies and master studies under the same title.
- Faculty of Visual Arts – specialist studies Design of Visual Communications and Audiovisual Production and master studies under the same title.
- Faculty of Law – specialist studies Commercial Law and Judicial–Criminal Law and master studies Commercial Law, Judicial–Criminal Law and Legal-Political study program
- Faculty of Engineering – Civil Engineering higher Study Programme and Architecture Study Programme

=== PhD studies ===
- Faculty of “Montenegro Tourism School” organizes PhD studies Management in Tourism with the duration of three years.

=== American studies at Mediterranean University ===
From the 2010/11 academic year Mediterranean University and Rochester Institute of Technology from New York will offer a masters of science in professional studies. Students will be offered two study programmes: Service Leadership and Innovation and Project Management. Upon successful completion of studies, students will receive dual degrees. Teaching staff of Mediterranean University and Rochester Institute of Technology will deliver the programmes and lectures will be in English.

== Scientific research and other projects ==
The University established a Centre for Project Research and Consulting. Through working with projects and development of the teaching staff University strengthens the bond between academic and business environment in Montenegro. By accepting European standards in teaching and scientific research, and through cooperation with many international institutions of higher education, the University actively participates in the cultural and economic development of Montenegro and its integration into European and world trends. Mediterranean University in cooperation with partner universities from the EU - University of Debrecen, Hungary, Wageningen University, Netherlands, Scottish Agricultural College, Budapest Business School, and partners from Montenegro - University of Montenegro, Chamber of Economy of Montenegro and the Ministry of Tourism of Montenegro, have started in January 2010 the TEMPUS project under the title "Development of Business Training in Montenegro”. The main goal of DEBUT-M project is to establish partnerships between higher education institutions and companies through free business training for experts and managers from companies in Montenegro.

== Cooperation ==
=== Cooperation with commercial entities ===
Mediterranean University is a part of Atlas group.

Mediterranean University and the Chamber of Commerce of Montenegro have intense cooperation in fields of professional development programmes, analysis and projects, organization of seminars, round tables and other professional gatherings including participation of the University representatives in the work of the arbitration bodies established within the Chamber, and other forms of cooperation.

University “Mediteran” in cooperation with the Directorate for Anti-Corruption Initiative of Montenegro through joint research projects, organization of lectures, workshops, seminars and other scientific and professional activities as well as development of various publications and other advertising materials makes important steps in the field of preventing and combating corruption in education.

=== Interuniversity cooperation ===
Mediterranean University maintains and develops contacts with other universities according to the mutually harmonized and signed bilateral agreements, which foresee: teacher and student exchange, common research projects, participation in seminars and other academic gatherings, professional training programmes and other activities promoting academic cooperation. The most important partners of the University:

- Singidunum University, Belgrade, Serbia
- University of Banja Luka, Banja Luka, Bosnia and Herzegovina
- University “Džemal Bijedić”, Mostar, Bosnia and Herzegovina
- West Coast University, Panama
- University of Niš, Niš, Serbia
- Universita degli Studi di Bari, Bari, Italy
- University "Goce Delčev", Štip, North Macedonia
- University of Ljubljana, Ljubljana, Slovenia
- Megatrend University, Belgrade, Serbia
- Stroganov Moscow State University of Arts and Industry, Moscow, Russia
- Russian State Humanitarian University, Moscow, Russia
- University of Debrecen, Debrecen, Hungary
- IFAM Business School, Paris, France
- Faculty of Philology, University of Belgrade, Belgrade, Serbia
- Academy of Diplomacy and Security, Belgrade, Serbia
- Belgrade Banking Academy, Belgrade, Serbia
- UniAdrion Executive Secretariat, Ravenna, Italy
- Institute of Economic Sciences, Belgrade, Serbia
- Faculty of Administrative and European Studies, Podgorica, Montenegro
- Moscow Aviation Institute, Moscow, Russia
- Gazi University, Ankara, Turkey

== Distance Learning System ==
All Faculties of University Mediterranean offer Distance Learning System (DLS) in their curricula.

== Science and sports ==
Mediterranean University and "Budućnost" karate club traditionally organize the tournament Grand Prix Mediteran with the aim to connect science and sport and popularize sports among and students.

Mediterranean University basketball club was founded in 2006 with the intention to promote Mediterranean University in the sporting field. In the debutant season 2006/07 the club competed in the Second Republic's League and it entered the higher level of competition – First B league.

== Notable alumni ==
- Andrej Milović, lawyer and politician

== See also ==
- List of colleges and universities
- University of Montenegro
