= Nebojša Kaluđerović =

Montenegrin politician and diplomat

Minister of Foreign Affairs
- In office 10 July 2012 – 4 December 2012
- Prime Minister: Igor Lukšić
- Preceded by: Milan Roćen
- Succeeded by: Igor Lukšić

Personal details
- Born: 17 December 1955 (age 70) Nikšić, PR Montenegro, Yugoslavia
- Website: Government webpage

Nebojša Kaluđerović (born 1955 in Nikšić, Yugoslavia) is a Montenegrin politician and diplomat, who served as Minister of Foreign Affairs briefly in 2012. He served as the Ambassador and Permanent Representative to the United Nations for Montenegro between 11 August 2006 and 1 April 2010 and also as ambassador-at-large at the Ministry of Foreign Affairs of Montenegro.

== Biography ==
He graduated from the University of Belgrade's Law School, Serbia. Besides his native Montenegrin, he speaks English and Russian fluently.

Before 1991, he served as a Permanent Ambassasor to the United Nations for the Socialist Federal Republic of Yugoslavia, focusing on international security and disarmament issues. From 1981 to 1992, Kaluđerović was a member of the Federal Secretariat for Foreign Affairs in Yugoslavia. He was the Special Advisor for multilateral affairs to the Federal Foreign Minister of the Federal Republic of Yugoslavia between 1991 and 1992. Between 1994 and 2000, the new envoy worked in the trade and engineering sector in the Russian Federation. He was Assistant Minister of Foreign Affairs from 2000 until 2001. From 2002 to 2003, he was Chief of Cabinet to the President of Montenegro. From 2003 to 2004, Kaluđerović served as Chief of Cabinet to the Prime Minister of Montenegro. From 2004 until 2006, Kaluđerović was the Permanent Representative of Serbia and Montenegro to the United Nations. In 2006, following the Montenegrin independence referendum, he served as the Special Envoy of the Government of Montenegro to the United Nations.

On March 31, 2007, for being the first Ambassador of the newly independent Montenegro to the United Nations, Prince Nicholas of Montenegro invested him with the insignia of Grand Cross in the Order of Danilo I.
