= Miodrag Vlahović (politician, born 1961) =

Montenegrin politician and diplomat (born 1961)

Miodrag Vlahović Миодраг Влаховић
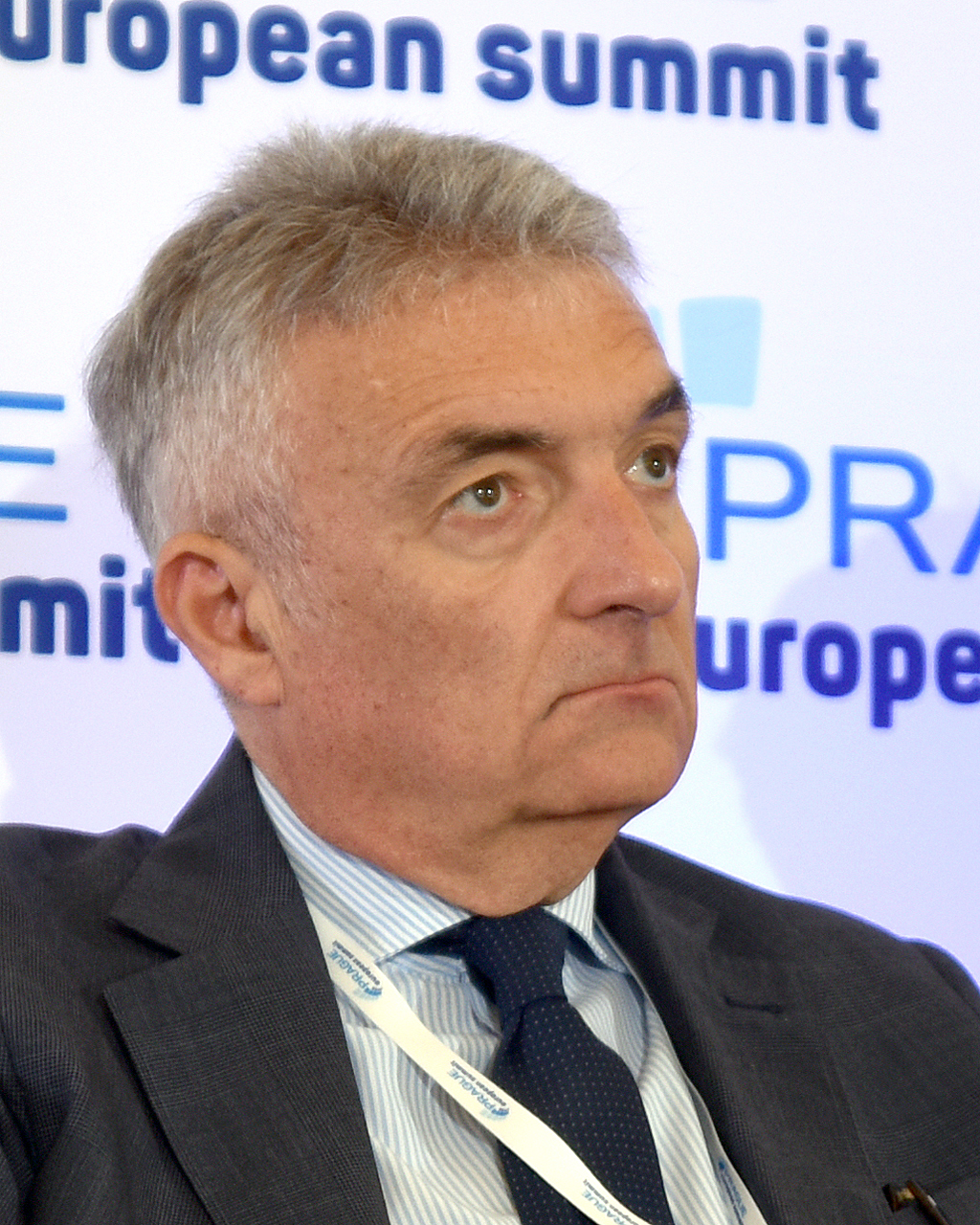
- Miodrag Vlahović in 2024

Minister of Foreign Affairs
- In office July 2004 – November 2006

Ambassador of Montenegro to the United States
- In office December 2006 – November 2010

Ambassador to Canada
- In office 2007–2010

Ambassador to Iceland
- In office 2006–2010

Ambassador to the Holy See
- In office 2017–2021

Personal details
- Born: 15 November 1961 (age 64)
- Party: Independent

Miodrag Vlahović (Montenegrin Cyrillic: Миодраг Влаховић; born 15 November 1961) is a Montenegrin politician and former diplomat.

== Education and background ==
He was born in Đakovica, Serbia, FPR Yugoslavia and graduated from Veljko Vlahović University's Faculty of Law in Titograd in 1981. He completed his LLM at the University of Belgrade's Law School, specializing in international trade contracts. He furthered his law studies in Paris, Luxembourg, and Leiden, Netherlands.

== Career ==
Since 1990, he has been the owner of MConsult ltd, one of the first private consulting firms in Montenegro. He was the founder of Citizens Committee for Peace, a Montenegrin peace movement in 1991. He organized the first peace rally in Montenegro, on 17 July 1991, where he delivered the speech "Heroism Today is Not To Go to War". He was a Member of Parliament in the Parliament of the Republic of Montenegro from 1992 to 1994, and the Liberal Alliance of Montenegro international secretary from 1992 to 1993. He resigned from Parliament in 1994, in protest over unconstitutional changes to the Electoral Law. In 2014 he founded a new party called Crnogorska demokratska unija (Montenegrin Democratic Union), which in 2017 changed its name to Crnogorska (Montenegrin).

Since 2004, Vlahović acted as an independent politician and diplomat, affiliated with the ruling DPS of Milo Đukanović, in several DPS-led governments, from 2004 until 2020 election, and the end of DPS rule in Montenegro, after 30 years in power. He was the first Minister of Foreign Affairs upon Montenegro's independence in June 2006 (serving as a foreign minister from July 2004 to November 2006). On 6 December Vlahović became Montenegro's Ambassador to the United States; that day, he presented his credentials to Secretary of State Condoleezza Rice. From 30 October 2007 Ambassador Vlahović was also accredited to Canada. He was also accredited as Montenegrin ambassador to Iceland, from 2006 to 2010.

He most recently served as the Montenegrin ambassador to the Holy See and to the Sovereign Military Order of Malta, in Rome, from 2017 to 2021. Following the results of 2020 election, which resulted in a victory for the opposition parties and the fall from power of the ruling DPS, after ruling country for 30 years, Vlahović was removed from the office of ambassador in February 2021, after months of disputing the new technocratic cabinet of Montenegro and refusing to leave the office.

== Controversies ==
In 2021 Vlahović refused to leave the office of the ambassador of Montenegro to the Holy See and to the Sovereign Military Order of Malta, and according to the official statement by the Montenegrin Ministry of Foreign Affairs, changed the lock on the embassy's door and refused to hand over his post to the temporary chargé d'affaires appointed by the Ministry. The situation ended when the President of Montenegro, Milo Đukanović, signed the decree officially recalling Vlahović.

As of 2021, Vlahović is facing disciplinary actions for inappropriate behavior, insubordination, and making internal documents public. Montenegrin Agency for Prevention of Corruption brought several decisions stating that Vlahović broke the law by avoiding to declare his income and assets.

== See also ==
- Foreign relations of Montenegro
  - Ministry of Foreign Affairs
- Montenegrin (party)
- Liberal Party of Montenegro
