= Olivera Lakić =

Montenegrin investigative journalist

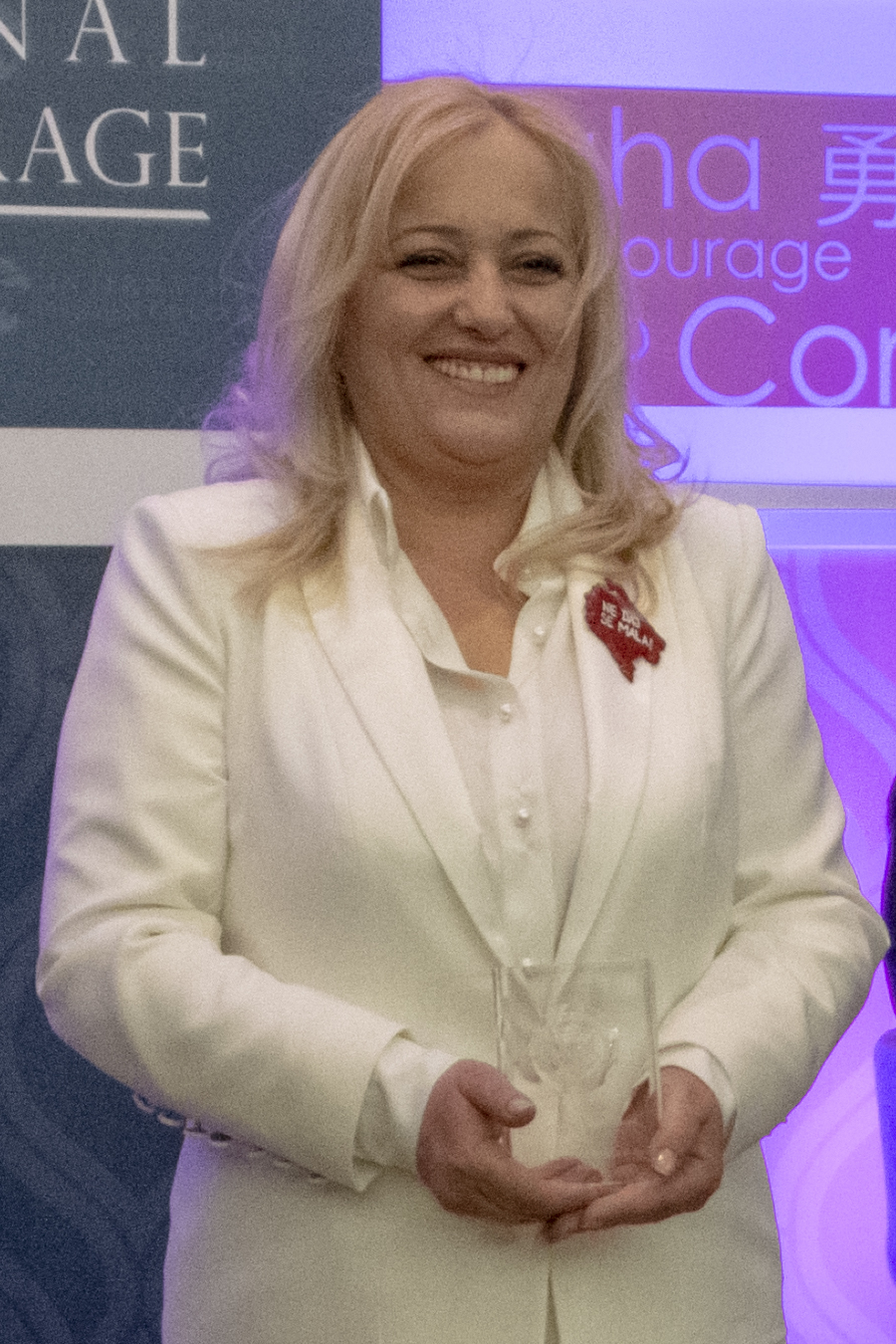
- Lakić upon receiving the International Women of Courage Award in 2019
- Occupation: Journalist
- Employer: Libertas Press
- Awards: International Women of Courage Award

Olivera Lakić is a Montenegrin investigative journalist for the Montenegrin newsroom Libertas Press working for the daily newspaperVijesti. In May 2018, she was shot and injured by a gunman outside her home in Podgorica after investigating corruption in Montenegro. She became an International Women of Courage Award recipient in 2019.

== Life ==
Lakić is an investigative journalist for the Montenegrin newsroom Libertas Press, and the daily newspaper Vijesti. Lakić wrote stories on crime and corruption in Montenegro, including stories on counterfeit tobacco products. Beginning in 2011, Lakić received threats against her and her daughter, if she did not cease her work. In 2012 she was attacked outside her home in Podgorica, and then again on 8 May 2018 in the same location. In the second attack she was wounded in the leg by a gunman. The attack was condemned by Prime Minister Duško Marković, and international governments and organisations. It was the second attack on a Montenegrin journalist in a month, and began a movement to reform media and journalist safety in Montenegro. She became an International Women of Courage Award recipient in 2019.

In December 2020 it was announced that two suspects had been detained, alongside others already in prison, for planning Lakić's assassination. In April 2025 the trial of a group of suspects in the 2018 attack and subsequent assassination plot was due to start in the High Court in Podgorica, but was instead assigned to a new panel, chaired by Radovan Vlaović. The defendants have also been charged with the murder of Miodrag Kruščić and with smuggling marijuana from Albania into Montenegro.
