= Mevludin Nuhodžić =

Montenegrin politician

Mevludin Nuhodžić Мевлудин Нухоџић

Minister of Internal Affairs of Montenegro
- In office 28 November 2016 – 4 December 2020
- Prime Minister: Duško Marković
- Preceded by: Goran Danilović
- Succeeded by: Sergej Sekulović

Personal details
- Born: 1959 (age 66–67) Bijelo Polje, PR Montenegro, FPR Yugoslavia
- Party: Democratic Party of Socialists
- Profession: Politician

Mevludin Nuhodžić (Serbian Cyrillic: Мевлудин Нухоџић; born 1959) is a Montenegrin politician who served as the Minister of Internal Affairs in the Government of Montenegro from November 2016 until December 2020. Previously, he served as the Minister without Portfolio from 1992 to 1996. Nuhodžić is a member of the presidency of the Democratic Party of Socialists.

== Biography ==
Nuhodžić was born in 1959 in Bijelo Polje which at that time was a part of the Federal People's Republic of Yugoslavia. He graduated from the Faculty of Law and the Faculty of Political Sciences at the University of Montenegro.

=== Political career ===
From 1990 to 1992 he was a member of the Parliament of Montenegro and from 1992 to 1996 he served as the Minister without Portfolio of the Republic of Montenegro which was a federal unit within the Federal Republic of Yugoslavia.

From 1998 to 2016, he was once again a member of the parliament and from 2000 a member of the presidency of the Democratic Party of Socialists. From 2000 to 2012 he was the Director of the Property Administration. In 2016, he was named a new Minister of Interior in the Government of Duško Marković.
