= Migo Stijepović =

Montenegrin politician

Slavoljub "Migo" Stijepović (Montenegrin Cyrillic: Славољуб "Миго" Стијеповић; born 2 May 1959 in Titograd, SFR Yugoslavia, now Podgorica, Montenegro) is a Montenegrin politician who was the Minister of Science and Education in Government of Montenegro from 2010 until 2014 and previously a minister without portfolio, between 2008 and 2010. Stijepović was also a Mayor of Podgorica, from 2014 until 2018, when he was replaced by Ivan Vuković. Graduated in Laws by the University of Montenegro Faculty of Law, until 1991 he worked in the economy, when he joined the newly formed Democratic Party of Socialists, which has been in power in Montenegro ever since. He is currently active as political advisor of the President of Montenegro, Milo Đukanović.

Stijepović is also known for numerous gaffes and slips during his public appearances. Quoting but also caricaturing Stijepović's statements on social media began intensively after an interview during the 2014 campaign for the mayor of Podgorica, in which he, then Minister of Education, said that the city of Podgorica would develop as London and "Paris Saint-Germain", and later addressing the mayor of Paris, as the "President of Paris".

== Controversies and affairs ==
In mid-January 2019, a video clip from 2016 surfaced in which President Đukanović's former ally, British-Montenegrin businessman Duško Knežević, appeared to hand the Mayor of Podgorica and high-ranked DPS member, Slavoljub Stijepović, an envelope containing what Knežević later said was $97,000, to fund a Democratic Party of Socialists parliamentary election campaign which were held that year. After fleeing to London, Knežević told the media he had been providing such unreported money to the DPS for the past 25 years. Protests against corruption within Montenegrin DPS-lead government have started in February 2019 soon after the revelation of footage and documents that appear to implicate top officials in obtaining suspicious funds for the ruling party. The protests failed in mid-2019. To date, no official proceedings have been initiated against corruption within a DPS-led government. Involved in corruption affairs within the government and the ruling Democratic Party of Socialists remain in their offices, including Stijepović.
