= Vladimir Božović (diplomat) =

Ambassador of the Republic of Serbia to Montenegro

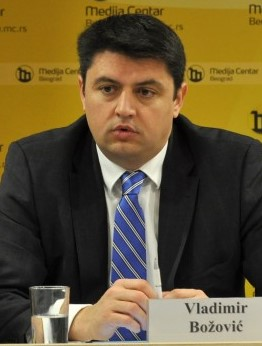
Božović in 2014

Vladimir Božović (Serbian Cyrillic: Владимир Божовић; born 3 December 1970) is a Serbian diplomat, politician, lawyer and the former Ambassador of Serbia to Montenegro. On November 16, 2023, he assumed the post of Consul General of Serbia in New York, with responsibility for 12 East coast states and Puerto Rico.

== Biography ==
=== Early life and education ===
Božović was born in 1970 to a Montenegrin Serb family in Nikšić, Montenegro which at that time was part of the Socialist Federal Republic of Yugoslavia. He completed middle and high school education in Nikšić. He graduated from the Higher School of Internal Affairs of the Ministry of Internal Affairs in Zemun. He completed his basic law studies. He obtained the title of Master of Laws with his master's thesis "Corruption and anti-corruption awareness with reference to the police". In 2019, he received his doctorate from the Faculty of Security at the University of Belgrade on the topic "Police Integrity and Police Corruption in Serbia". He completed specialist courses and trainings in Serbia, Hungary and the USA. He participated in the "KOKALIS" programs of the Harvard University Foundation on the Science and Art of Negotiation in Greece. Through his work in the Government of Serbia, he participated in three international conferences on the fight against corruption in the European Union.

=== Law career ===
In the period from 1991 to 1993, he was the president of the Student Union of the Higher School of Internal Affairs and the president of the Student Union of the Higher Schools of Belgrade. In the same period, he was also a member of the Executive Board of the Belgrade Students' Union. As a law graduate, he gained an internship in Belgrade, but also in the United States (Milwaukee and Chicago) from 1995 to 1997. After that, in 1997, he opened his own Law Office Božović. He represented the Serbian Orthodox Church and the Metropolitanate of Montenegro and the Littoral. At the same time, he worked as the head of the Department of Justice and Human Rights in the Coordination Center of the Government of the Federal Republic of Yugoslavia and the Republic of Serbia for Kosovo and Metohija.

=== Career in Government ===
In 2004, he was appointed Deputy Minister of Internal Affairs. He remained in that position until 2007. During that period, he also performed the function of the Inspector General of the Public Security Department of the Ministry of the Interior of the Republic of Serbia, and the National Coordinator for Police and Human Rights of Serbia and Montenegro at the Council of Europe. He performed the function of State Secretary of the Ministry of Internal Affairs of the Republic of Serbia on two occasions. For the first time from April to November 2012, and after that in the period from June 2017 to December 2019, after which he took over the function of the Ambassador of the Republic of Serbia to Montenegro. Adviser to the Prime Minister in charge of regional cooperation and relations with religious communities in the Government of Ivica Dačić was from May 2015 to June 2017.

== Social work ==
- He is the founder of the Petar II Petrović Njegoš Fund and the Center for Strategic Projects.
- Since October 2018, he has been a member of a network of influential people and organizations working to achieve Goal 8 of the United Nations on the abolition of modern slavery and human trafficking.
- In May 2015, he was appointed a member of the Coordination Board for Gender Equality.
- In October 2013, he participated in a meeting of the Global Community regarding the adoption of strategic guidelines for the international police in peacekeeping operations, organized by the United Nations - UN Department of Peacekeeping Operations and the Durham Institute for Global Security, University of London.
- In November 2014, as Deputy Chairman of the Organizing Committee and Chairman of the Protocol Committee, he participated in the organization of the Third Meeting of the Heads of Government of China and the countries of Central and Eastern Europe.
- As a representative of the Prime Minister's Office, in May 2015 he joined the work of the Commission for Determining Program Content and Giving Proposals for the Management Model of the Memorial Complex at the Old Belgrade Fair.
- For years he was a guest at the White House Prayer Breakfast.

== Scientific papers ==
- Provisional Criminal Procedure Code of Kosovo, scientific journal Pravni život, 2003, vol. 52, No. 9, p. 509-524;
- "Corruption in the Serbian police: Current situation", scientific journal Law: Theory and Practice, 2012, vol. 29, no. 1–3, p. 27-43;
- Personal Evidence in Criminology and Criminal Procedure Law, Proceedings; Sarajevo. Banja Luka: International Association of Criminalists, 2013.
- Humanitarian Organizations in the Function of Terrorism, Proceedings of the International Conference "Terrorism as a global threat", Faculty of Law, Faculty of Economics and Justice, University of Economics Novi Sad, 2012.
- A Comparative Study of Public Opinion on Police Corruption in Croatia and Serbia, for which he received the award of the international association of the Academy of Criminal Law in 2017.
