= Andrija Lompar =

Montenegrin politician (born 1956)

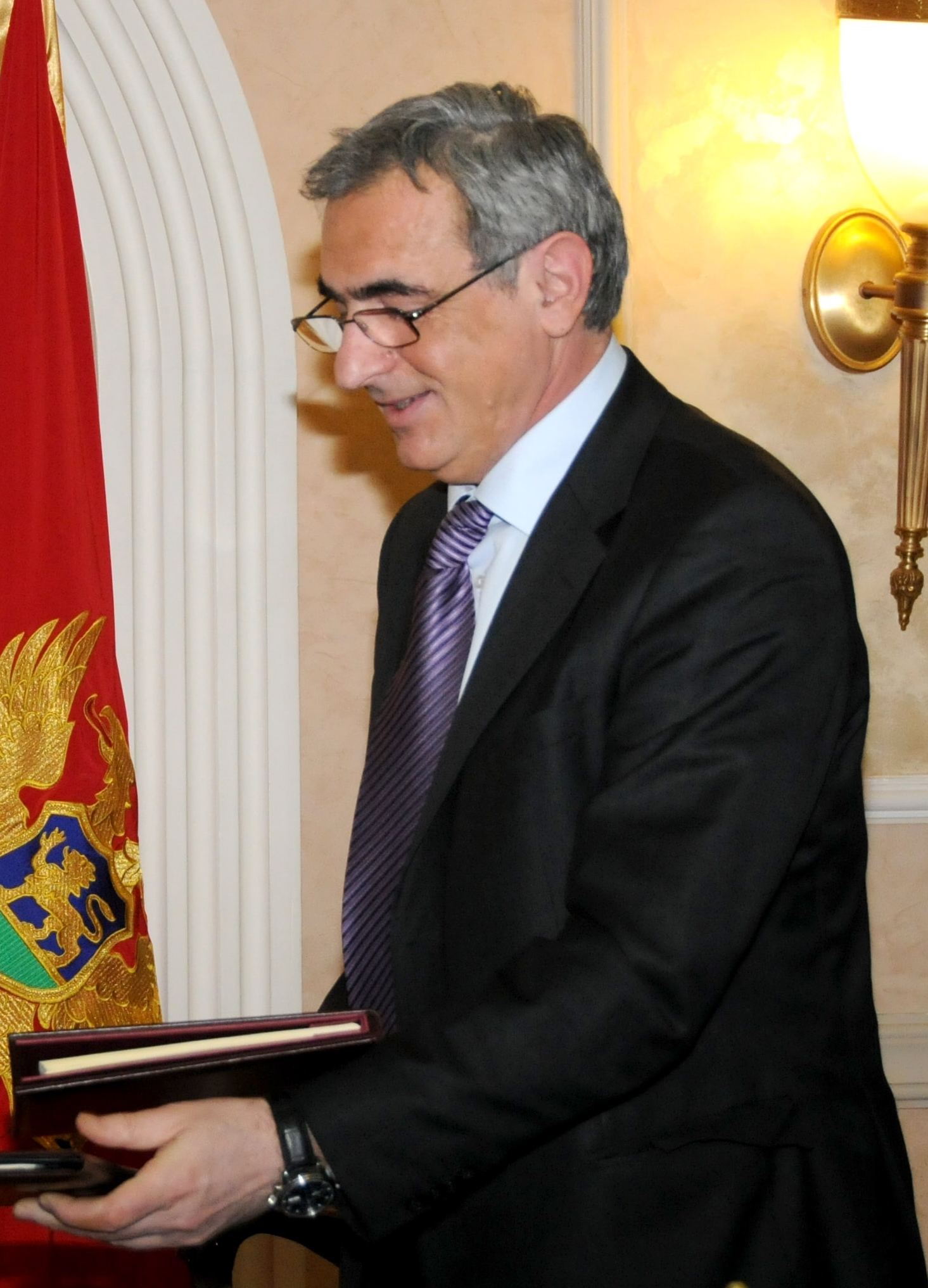
Andrija Lompar in 2012

Andrija Lompar (Montenegrin Cyrillic: Андрија Ломпар; born 26 November 1956 in Cetinje, SR Montenegro, Yugoslavia) is a Montenegrin politician and the former Minister of Maritime Affairs, Transportation and Telecommunications in the Government of Montenegro. He is also a member of the Social Democratic Party of Montenegro.

== Biography and political career ==
He finished elementary and high school in Kotor and graduated from the School of Mechanical Engineering, in Shipbuilding. In 1981, he received a Master degree from the World Nautical University in Sweden, and in 1988, he received a doctorate from the University of Montenegro. He also holds the "Luča" diploma.

Prior to becoming Minister of Maritime Affairs, Transportation and Telecommunications, he was a dean at the Faculty of Marine Studies of the University of Montenegro. He was appointed Minister of Maritime Affairs, Transportation and Telecommunication in January 2003, under Prime Minister Milo Đukanović, but stepped down in January 2006. When Željko Šturanović was appointed as the new prime minister of Montenegro, Šturanović appointed Lompar as Minister of Maritime Affairs, Transportation and Telecommunications.

As an author and/or co-author, Lompar published a number of studies, and as a permanent or hired consultant, he was working with a number of enterprises mostly from the field of maritime affairs and transport. He leads a team which made it possible for Montenegrin seafarers to be at the IMO "White list" and represents Montenegro on relevant conferences.

Lompar is also representative of the University of Montenegro in various integration programmes and reforms of the universities of Southeast Europe in the European educational area.

In addition to Montenegrin, his native language, Lompar can fluently speak and write in English.
