= Milan Roćen =

Montenegrin politician

Milan Roćen Милан Роћен
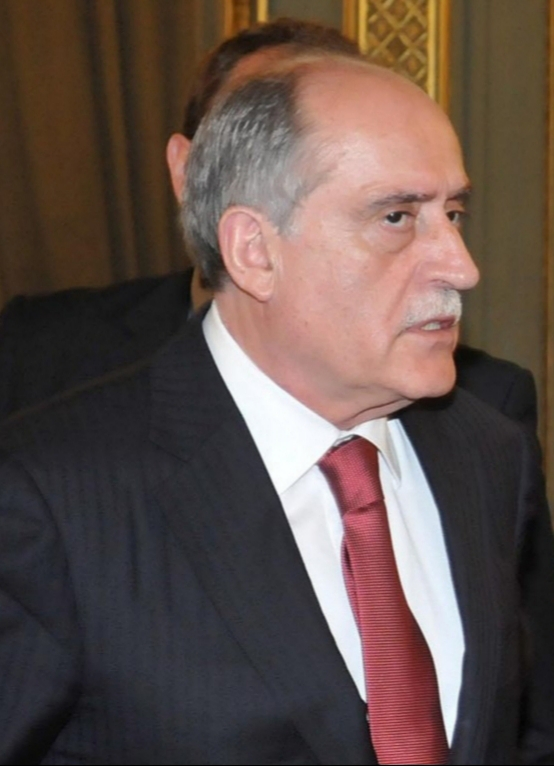

Minister of Foreign Affairs of Montenegro
- In office 10 November 2006 – 10 July 2012
- Prime Minister: Željko Šturanović; Milo Đukanović; Igor Lukšić
- Preceded by: Miodrag Vlahović
- Succeeded by: Nebojša Kaluđerović

Personal details
- Born: 23 November 1950 (age 75) Žabljak, PR Montenegro, FPR Yugoslavia
- Party: Democratic Party of Socialists
- Education: University of Belgrade
- Website: Government webpage

Milan Roćen (Montenegrin Cyrillic: Милан Роћен; born 23 November 1950 in Žabljak, SR Montenegro, Yugoslavia) is a Montenegrin politician who was the first Minister of Foreign Affairs in Government of Montenegro following independence in 2006 and the last ambassador of the State Union of Serbia and Montenegro to the Russian Federation (from 2004 to 2006). He was a political advisor of the President of Montenegro, Milo Đukanović.

== Personal life ==
He graduated in journalism from the Faculty of Political Science, University of Belgrade. He is married and has one son. Besides speaking his native Montenegrin, he also speaks Russian.

== Political career ==
From 1976 to 1979, following his degree in journalism, Milan Roćen was a journalist for the weekly magazine Ekonomska politika in Belgrade.

In 1979, he became a staff member for the information and propaganda department of the presidency of the central committee of the League of Communists of Montenegro. In 1982, he became political chief of staff to the President of the same committee.

From November 2006 to July 2012, Milan Roćen was the Minister of Foreign Affairs of Montenegro (Minister of Foreign Affairs and European Integration of Montenegro from December 2010).

Roćen is one of the most influential members of the ruling Democratic Party of Socialists, which has been in power in Montenegro since the introduction of a multi-party system in 1990.

=== Controversy ===
According to an investigation supported by the Puffin Foundation Investigative Fund in 2008, The Nation reported that Roćen, then ambassador of Serbia and Montenegro to the Russian Federation, authorized a contract with Davis Manafort Inc, a consulting firm founded by Rick Davis, and that the firm was paid several million dollars to help organize the 2006 Montenegrin independence referendum campaign. Referendum finance documents did not record any exchanges with Davis Manafort, although the claims of the payments were backed my multiple American diplomats and Montenegrin government officials on the condition of anonymity.

In June 2019, an audio recording from the mid-2005 surfaced, that shows ambassador Roćen expresses concern over the EU pressure on the authorities of the Republic of Montenegro, asking Russian oligarch Oleg Deripaska, on behalf of then-Prime Minister of Montenegro Đukanović, to lobby for the Montenegrin independence referendum, through his connections with Canadian billionaire Peter Munk in the United States.
