= Tarzan Milošević =

Montenegrin politician (born 1954)

Tarzan Milošević (Serbian Cyrillic: Тарзан Милошевић; born 28 July 1954) is a Montenegrin politician and diplomat.

Formerly the mayor of Bijelo Polje, from 2011 Milošević became Montenegro's Minister for Agriculture and Rural Development (Ministar poljoprivrede i ruralnog razvoja), a post he held until 2012.

He served as Montenegro’s ambassador to Serbia from 2019 to 2020.

Milošević is a member of the ruling Democratic Party of Socialists of Montenegro.
