= Duško Knežević =

Duško Knežević Душко Кнежевић
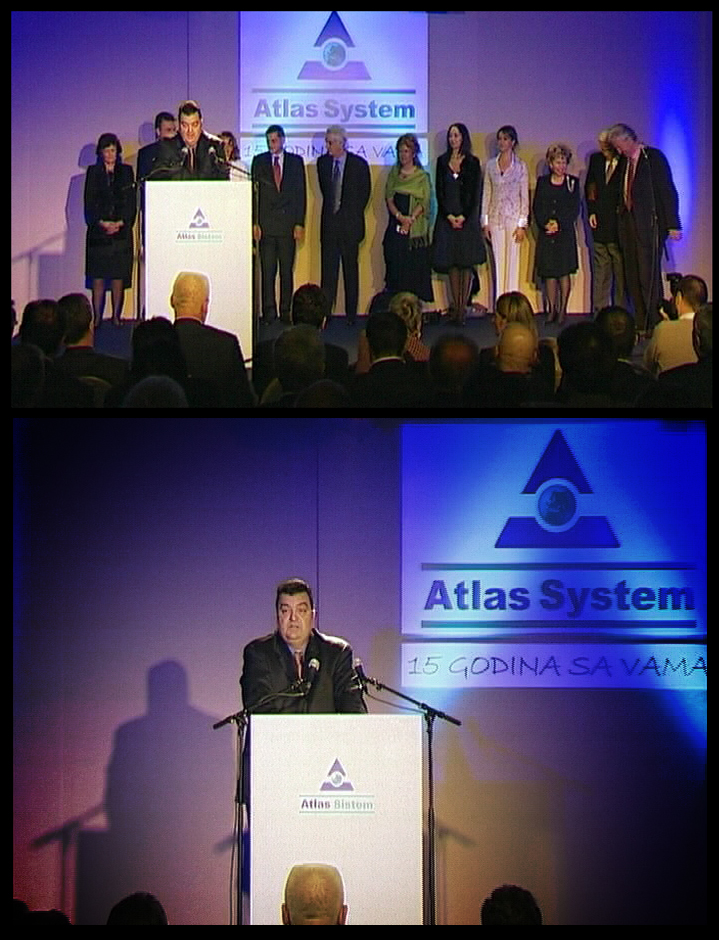
- Duško Knežević speaks at ceremony of 15th anniversary of Atlas System.

President of board of directors of Mediterranean University
- Incumbent
- Assumed office 30 May 2006

Personal details
- Born: 30 May 1959 (age 67) Titograd, PR Montenegro, FPR Yugoslavia
- Citizenship: Montenegrin, Serbian, British, Cypriot
- Education: Faculty of Economics, University of Belgrade (B.Sc., M.Sc.); Faculty of Law, University of Belgrade (Ph.D.)
- Occupation: Economist
- Website: Official website

Dr Duško Knežević (Serbian Cyrillic: Душко Кнежевић) is the founder and president of the board of directors of Atlas Group Corporation (AGC), a financial group based in Montenegro consisting of companies with interests in banks in Serbia, Cyprus and Great Britain.

Last five years Dr Duško Knežević has been living in London UK.

In addition to his business interests, he is the founder and president of the board of two business-oriented universities, in Montenegro and in Serbia. In April 2010, Knežević became a member of Clinton Global Initiative.

Knežević founded the Atlas Foundation in 2010. The mission of the Foundation is to support the creation of new societal values and economic empowerment of citizens through enhancement of business environment and corporate social responsible practices. Improving regional cooperation is one of the key goals of the Atlas Foundation. Knežević organised the Inaugural Conference “Balkan Networking for Social Empowerment of South-Eastern Europe” that was held in Budva in May 2011, under the auspices of the Government of Montenegro and Atlas Foundation, and in partnership with Clinton Global Initiative. The main objective of this event was to address pressing challenges facing South-Eastern Europe through developing cross-border and new models of cross-sector cooperation.

== Personal life ==
Born 30 May 1959, Knežević completed elementary and high school in Titograd (now Podgorica). He obtained a bachelor's degree in Finance and Banking at the Faculty of Economics, University of Belgrade, and a Master of Science in Banking and Finance, also at the Faculty of Economics, University of Belgrade. After defending with merits his doctorate dissertation 'Legal and economic prerequisites of sustainability of pension insurance system' at the Faculty of Law, University of Belgrade, Duško Knežević was awarded a scientific degree Doctor of Legal and Economic Studies. He lectures in finance-related subjects at the UNION University.

== Atlas Group ==
Knežević is President of the Atlas Group (AGC), which he founded 25 years ago in Yugoslavia. The AGC has grown into an internationally acknowledged company, consisting of 30 companies including banks, finance, real estate, construction, tourism, education, health and media. Strong business relationships and partnerships with, among others, Abu Dhabi Capital Group owned by Royal family from UAE, Bursa Istanbul, Mace London, Piraeus Bank, EBRD, Century 21 Real Estate and Turner Real Estate USA, have been developed.

Knežević founded and is President of the board of Mediterranean University (the first private university in Montenegro) and the Belgrade Banking Academy.

== Recent Projects ==
FinInvest Montenegro, in collaboration with Capital Investments, a company owned by the royal family in Abu Dhabi, is completing a 180 million euro residential business complex investment in Podgorica. FinInvest Montenegro stands behind a major health-tourism project in Meljine, on Montenegro's Adriatic Coast.

== Higher education ==
Knežević is the founder and president of the board of:

- University "Mediterranean" – the first private university in Montenegro
- Belgrade Banking Academy, the only institution of its kind in the region

== 2019 prosecution and political initiative ==
A video clip from 2016 surfaced in January which showed Dusko Knezevic appearing to hand the then mayor of Podgorica, Slavoljub Stijepovic, an envelope containing what Knezevic later said was $100,000, to fund a DPS election campaign. Knezevic, who is now in London, has told the media he had been providing secret cash to the DPS for the past 25 years. Some saw this as the first concrete confirmation of something that has long been an open secret in Montenegro. The DPS and Djukanovic have denied wrongdoing, insisting that all donations to the party are recorded in the party's financial records. The authorities have since gone after Knezevic, until recently close to the ruling elite, who now faces charges of money laundering. Another video that Knezevic released late in January and February showed a senior central bank official asking for a bribe not to send inspectors into one of Knezevic's banks. Knezevic has also released documents that he claims prove that he helped finance Djukanovic's lavish travels abroad in five-star hotels and covering his personal expenses.

In February 2019 Montenegro has been rocked by a wave of street protests calling on the President and the DPS-led government to resign and accusing them of corruption. Knezevic's accusations against Djukanovic have been a driving force behind the street protests; he claims to have been a major illicit donor to the ruling DPS over the last 25 years. Opposition parties and civic groups behind the protests are divided, however, over Knezevic's role in the protest movement, with many wanting to keep a distance from him.

In order to fight for rule of law and against corruption, in the Spring 2019 Duško Knežević initiated DO SLOBODE movement and announced establishment of the political party.

== Paper works, articles and books ==
- Fernando Diz, Hasan Hanić, Duško Knezević: “On the Black-Scholes Model and why Scholes and Merton won the Nobel Prize”, work presented in the Symposium Financial Innovations, November 1997
- D. Knežević, “Selection of Strategic Partner for Atlas Bank”, work presented at the Round Table “Privatization of Banks in Serbia – four years later”, Belgrade, 17 May 2005, printed for conference proceedings, Belgrade Banking Academy and Institute of Economic Sciences, Belgrade, pp. 131–33
- D. Knežević, “Credit Insurance”, Belgrade Banking Academy Belgrade, 2007.
- D. Knežević, M. Jovović and I. Džaković, “Credit Insurance”, Sixth International Symposium “New Products in Insurance Market”, Association of Actuaries of Serbia and Faculty of Economics, Zlatibor 2008.
- S. Stefanović, D. Knežević, “Secondary Mortgage Markets and Instruments – Review of Experiences of European Union Countries,” conference proceedings from international science convention Banking Products and Services Market in Serbia, Belgrade Banking Academy, Belgrade, 2008
- D. Knežević, “Businesses in the region must cooperate with foreign investors”, World Finance Magazine, edition September–October 2010

== Links ==
- Knežević interview, WorldFinance.tv
- Knežević at Clinton Global Initiative meeting on YouTube
- Knežević's interview on Montenegro economics and investments at Analitika informative portal from Montenegro, portalanalitika.me
- Knežević's interview on Montenegro Stock Exchange, SEEbiz.eu
- Knežević's interview on Montenegro Stock Exchange unification at SEEbiz
- Knežević's interview (part 1) on YouTube at RTS, June 2010 (video)
- Knežević's interview (part 2) on YouTube at RTS, June 2010 (video)
- Turner International negotiations with Atlas Group in Montenegro, Atlas TV news report, September 2010 (video)
- Balkan Networking, the Inaugural Conference, Dusko Knežević, Atlas Group on YouTube, Budva, Montenegro, 22 May 2011 (video)
- RTS Upitnik: Duško Knežević - čovek sa crvene poternice Interpola, Mart 2019
- Duško Knežević intervju N1, Februar 2019
- NYT ‘Balkan Spring’ Turns to Summer, and Hopes for Change Dim
- Montenegro Protesters Demand President's Resignation
- Montenegrin political earthquake
- Ein unter Druck geratener Banker droht dem Regime in Montenegro, unsaubere Machenschaften auffliegen zu lassen
- A great protest against the corrupt regime of Milo Đukanović by the DO SLOBODE (“To Freedom”) movement
- Dr Duško Knežević participated in the British Parliament at the panel on Western Balkans
- Politico: Time for Europe's longest-serving ruler to go
