= 2014 IIHF World Championship Division II =

Tournament details
- Host countries: Serbia; Spain
- Venues: 2 (in 2 host cities)
- Dates: 9–15 April; 5–11 April
- Teams: 12

The 2014 IIHF World Championship Division II was a pair of international Ice hockey tournaments organized by the International Ice Hockey Federation. Group A was contested in Belgrade, Serbia, running from 9 to 15 April 2014 and Group B was contested in Jaca, Spain, running from 5 to 11 April 2014. Divisions II A and II B represent the fourth and the fifth tier of the Ice Hockey World Championships.

== Division II A ==
2014 IIHF World Championship Division II A

Tournament details
- Host country: Serbia
- Venue: 1 (in 1 host city)
- Dates: 9–15 April
- Teams: 6

Tournament statistics
- Games played: 15
- Goals scored: 122 (8.13 per game)
- Attendance: 7,915 (528 per game)

=== Participants ===
Team	Qualification
Estonia	Placed 6th in Division I B last year and was relegated
Belgium	Placed 2nd in Division II A last year.
Iceland	Placed 3rd in Division II A last year.
Australia	Placed 4th in Division II A last year.
Serbia	Host Placed 5th in Division II A last year.
Israel	Placed 1st in Division II B last year and was promoted.

=== Standings ===
Team	Pld	W	OTW	OTL	L	GF	GA	GD	Pts	Promotion or relegation
Estonia	5	5	0	0	0	36	8	+28	15	Promoted to the 2015 Division I B
Iceland	5	1	3	0	1	18	15	+3	9	
Serbia	5	2	0	1	2	19	23	−4	7	
Australia	5	1	0	2	2	13	14	−1	5	
Belgium	5	1	1	0	3	17	25	−8	5	
Israel	5	0	1	2	2	19	37	−18	4	Relegated to the 2015 Division II B

Source: IIHF

=== Results ===
All times are local (UTC+2).

9 April 2014; 13:00	Iceland	1–4 (0–1, 1–2, 0–1)	Estonia	Pionir Ice Hall, Belgrade; Attendance: 50

Game reference

Dennis Hedström
Goalies
Mark Rajevski
Referee:
(Slovenia) Luka Kamsek
Linesmen:
(Serbia) David Parduv
(Poland) Mariusz Smura

	0–1	16:57 – V. Bobkov (A. Sibirtsev, V. Titarenko)
E. Alengaard (R. Hedström, J. Gislason) (PP) – 26:31	1–1
	1–2	28:34 – V. Titarenko (V. Bobkov) (PP)
	1–3	R. Andrejev (R. Rooba, A. Gornostajev) – 32:41
	1–4	A. Ossipov (R. Andrejev) – 52:19

22 min
Penalties
18 min
14
Shots
38

9 April 2014; 16:30	Israel	4–3 OT (0–1, 0–1, 3–1) (OT 1–0)	Australia	Pionir Ice Hall, Belgrade; Attendance: 27

Game reference

Avihu Sorotzki
Goalies
Anthony Kimlin
Referee:
(Poland) Przemyslaw Kepa
Linesmen:
(Serbia) Tibor Fazekas
(Romania) Adrian Toparceanu

	0–1	08:15 – C. Todd (SH)
	0–2	37:03 – B. Cliff (C. Todd, S. McGregor)
D. Mazour (S. Frenkel, E. Sherbatov) – 47:04	1–2
D. Mazour (S. Frenkel, E. Sherbatov) – 53:56	2–2
	2–3	58:15 – B. McDowell (PS)
A. Eizenamn (E. Sherbatov, D. Mazour) (PP2, EA) – 59:54	3–3
O. Eizenamn – 64:44	4–3

10 min
Penalties
22 min
44
Shots
25

9 April 2014; 20:00	Belgium	8–3 (3–0, 2–2, 3–1)	Serbia	Pionir Ice Hall, Belgrade; Attendance: 1,021

Game reference

Bjorn Steijlen
Jean Cornelis
Goalies
Milan Luković
Arsenije Ranković
Referee:
(United Kingdom) Tom Darnell
Linesmen:
(Italy) David Tschirner
(Netherlands) Jeroen van den Berg

D. Swinnen (D. Geerts, J. Paulus) – 03:48	1–0
T. Dewin (F. Neven, N. Oerlemans) – 09:57	2–0
D. Swinnen (M. Pellegrims) – 14:23	3–0
	3–1	21:36 – M. Kovačević (SH)
L. Maas – 32:15	4–1
	4–2	34:56 – M. Kovačević (D. Filipović)
B. Kolodziejczyk (D. Swinnen, J. Engelen) – 37:34	5–2
M. Morgan (J. Engelen, L. Maas) (SH) – 41:52	6–2
M. Pellegrims (N. Oerlemans, T. Dewin) – 52:02	7–2
	7–3	54:46 – A. Luković (D. Filipović) (PP)
M. Pellegrims (B. Kolodziejczyk) (PP) – 55:34	8–3

16 min
Penalties
36 min
28
Shots
41

10 April 2014; 13:00	Estonia	5–1 (4–1, 1–0, 0–0)	Australia	Pionir Ice Hall, Belgrade; Attendance: 23

Game reference

Alexander Kolossov
Goalies
Anthony Kimlin
Referee:
(Poland) Przemyslaw Kepa
Linesmen:
(Serbia) David Parduv
(Netherlands) Jeroen van den Berg

A. Gornostajev (R. Rooba, R. Andrejev) – 05:13	1–0
	1–1	11:18 – C. Todd (B. Cliff, M. Humphries)
A. Makrov (L. Lahesalu, R. Rooba) (PP) – 14:10	2–1
R. Rooba (R. Andrejev) (SH) – 15:30	3–1
A. Makrov (A. Kuznetsov) – 17:43	4–1
A. Sibirtsev (S. Kerna, A. Kuznetsov) – 29:09	5–1

4 min
Penalties
12 min
54
Shots
11

10 April 2014; 16:30	Belgium	3–6 (2–2, 1–0, 0–4)	Iceland	Pionir Ice Hall, Belgrade; Attendance: 72

Game reference

Bjorn Steijlen
Goalies
Dennis Hedström
Referee:
(United Kingdom) Tom Darnell
Linesmen:
(Romania) Adrian Toparceanu
(Italy) David Tschirner

J. Engelen (M. Pellegrims) – 02:09	1–0
	1–1	05:27 – J. Gislason (E. Alengard, A. Helgason)
V. Morgan (D. Geerts, J. Engelen) – 06:28	2–1
	2–2	14:39 – R. Hedström
D. Geerts (B. Kolodziejczyk, D. Swinnen) (PP) – 30:56	3–2
	3–3	42:11 – R. Hedström (E. Alengard)
	3–4	49:38 – J. Gislason (E. Alengard, I. Jönsson) (PP)
	3–5	55:12 – B. Bergmann (S. Reynisson, A. Sverrisson)
	3–6	59:55 – R. Hedström (ENG)

14 min
Penalties
20 min
40
Shots
38

10 April 2014; 20:00	Serbia	10–6 (4–0, 2–3, 4–3)	Israel	Pionir Ice Hall, Belgrade; Attendance: 1,124

Game reference

Arsenije Ranković
Goalies
Avihu Sorotzki
Boris Amromin
Referee:
(France) Alexandre Bourreau
Linesmen:
(Norway) Remi Aasum
(Poland) Mariusz Smura

M. Babić (D. Filipović, M. Kovačević) – 00:24	1–0
N. Vučurević (P. Ogrizović, M. Babić) (PP) – 03:33	2–0
N. Vučurević (P. Ogrizović, N. Janković) – 05:40	3–0
M. Kovačević (N. Vučurević, N. Bibić) (PP2) – 16:02	4–0
M. Babić (M. Kovačević) – 22:55	5–0
N. Janković (N. Vučurević) – 34:21	6–0
	6–1	36:21 – S. Frenkel (D. Erlich, O. Eizenman) (PP)
	6–2	37:46 – D. Mazour (O. Eizenman, D. Erlich) (PP2)
	6–3	39:16 – E. Sherbatov (D. Erlich, A. Eizenman) (PP)
	6–4	40:33 – A. Eizenman (O. Eizenman, D. Erlich)
	6–5	43:44 – R. Oz (T. Avneri)
M. Kovačević (D. Filipović, B. Gabrić) (PP) – 45:46	7–5
M. Kovačević – 50:37	8–5
	8–6	51:13 – A. Eizenman (D. Erlich, O. Eizenman)
D. Filipović (M. Brkušanin, M. Kovačević) – 57:22	9–6
N. Vučurević (M. Pellegrims, N. Janković) – 58:42	10–6

22 min
Penalties
36 min
35
Shots
44

12 April 2014; 13:00	Belgium	4–3 OT (1–3, 2–0, 0–0) (OT 1–0)	Israel	Pionir Ice Hall, Belgrade; Attendance: 300

Game reference

Bjorn Steijlen
Goalies
Avihu Sorotzki
Referee:
(France) Alexandre Bourreau
Linesmen:
(Serbia) Tibor Fazekas
(Serbia) David Parduv

	0–1	06:30 – S. Frenkel (D. Mazour, E. Sherbatov)
	0–2	08:52 – E. Sherbatov (D. Erlich) (PP)
B. Kolodziejczyk (F. Neven, B. Vercammen) – 13:42	1–2
	1–3	17:48 – O. Eizenman (D. Erlich, A. Eizenman)
V. Morgan (L. Maas, V. Torremans) (PP) – 26:24	2–3
D. Geerts – 28:16	3–3
D. Swinnen (B. Kolodziejczyk) – 61:19	4–3

4 min
Penalties
6 min
44
Shots
35

12 April 2014; 16:30	Iceland	3–2 OT (1–0, 0–2, 1–0) (OT 1–0)	Australia	Pionir Ice Hall, Belgrade; Attendance: 300

Game reference

Dennis Hedström
Goalies
Anthony Kimlin
Referee:
(United Kingdom) Tom Darnell
Linesmen:
(Poland) Mariusz Smura
(Netherlands) Jeroen van den Berg

R. Hedström (E. Alengard, I. Jönsson) – 02:33	1–0
	1–1	26:54 – T. Graham (M. Rummukainen, C. Todd) (PP)
	1–2	33:42 – G. Oddy (M. Rummukainen)
J. Leifsson (Ó. Björnsson) – 56:16	2–2
J. Leifsson (P. Maack, I. Jönsson) – 61:00	3–2

2 min
Penalties
10 min
29
Shots
33

12 April 2014; 20:00	Estonia	5–2 (1–1, 2–0, 2–1)	Serbia	Pionir Ice Hall, Belgrade; Attendance: 1,274

Game reference

Aleksandr Kolossov
Goalies
Arsenije Ranković
Referee:
(Slovenia) Luka Kamsek
Linesmen:
(Norway) Remi Aasum
(Italy) David Tschirner

	0–1	08:17 – D. Filipović (B. Gabrić, N. Janković) (PP)
V. Virjassov (J. Sorokin, A. Jastrebov) – 11:42	1–1
R. Rooba (R. Andrejev, A. Gornostajev) – 23:36	2–1
J. Sorokin (K. Parras) – 26:05	3–1
	3–2	41:43 – N. Vučurević (A. Luković)
R. Rooba (R. Andrejev, A. Gornostajev) – 46:17	4–2
A. Ossipov (R. Rooba, R. Andrejev) – 51:30	5–2

12 min
Penalties
8 min
51
Shots
23

14 April 2014; 13:00	Australia	7–1 (2–0, 4–1, 1–0)	Belgium	Pionir Ice Hall, Belgrade; Attendance: 310

Game reference

Anthony Kimlin
Goalies
Bjorn Steijlen
Jean Cornelis
Referee:
(France) Alexandre Bourreau
Linesmen:
(Norway) Remi Aasum
(Romania) Adrian Toparceanu

L. Webster – 03:47	1–0
B. McDowell (A. Geric, T. Graham) (PP) – 13:34	2–0
J. Harding (L. Webster, D. Kudla) (PP) – 23:15	3–0
T. Powell (L. Webster, J. Byers) – 28:34	4–0
J. Harding (D. Kudla, B. McDowell) (PP) – 34:50	5–0
	5–1	37:00 – D. Swinnen (B. Kolodziejczyk)
M. Schlamp (B. McDowell, M. Rummukainen) (PP) – 38:32	6–1
M. Humphries (B. Cliff, C. Todd) – 54:36	7–1

37 min
Penalties
12 min
23
Shots
36

14 April 2014; 16:30	Israel	3–16 (0–6, 1–4, 2–6)	Estonia	Pionir Ice Hall, Belgrade; Attendance: 320

Game reference

Avihu Sorotzki
Boris Amromin
Goalies
Mark Rajevski
Referee:
(Slovenia) Luka Kamsek
Linesmen:
(Serbia) Tibor Fazekas
(Serbia) David Parduv

	0–1	03:55 – A. Gornostajev (V. Bobkov)
	0–2	08:01 – A. Sibirtsev (A. Gornostajev, V. Titarenko)
	0–3	09:26 – K. Parras (J. Sorokin)
	0–4	12:26 – J. Sorokin (K. Parras)
	0–5	13:10 – R. Rooba (A. Ossipov)
	0–6	19:11 – A. Makrov (R. Rooba)
	0–7	22:01 – A. Gornostajev (V. Bobkov)
D. Golodnizky – 23:22	1–7
	1–8	25:07 – A. Makrov (A. Levkovits)
	1–9	27:27 – R. Andrejev (A. Makrov, A. Jastrebov) (PP)
	1–10	33:02 – V. Virjassov (K. Parras)
D. Mazour (E. Sherbatov) (SH) – 44:00	2–10
	2–11	45:07 – A. Ossipov (V. Bobkov, A. Sibirtsev)
	2–12	45:35 – V. Titarenko (A. Jastrebov)
	2–13	48:42 – V. Bobkov (A. Levkovits, K. Kuusk)
E. Sherbatov (D. Erlich) – 53:13	3–13
	3–14	53:22 – V. Titarenko (A. Kuznetsov, A. Jastrebov)
	3–15	56:43 – A. Kuznetsov (A. Jastrebov)
	3–16	59:32 – A. Sibirtsev (R. Rooba)

24 min
Penalties
16 min
14
Shots
68

14 April 2014; 20:00	Serbia	3–4 GWS (0–2, 1–1, 2–0) (OT 0–0) (SO: 0–1)	Iceland	Pionir Ice Hall, Belgrade; Attendance: 1,321

Game reference

Milan Luković
Arsenije Ranković
Goalies
Dennis Hedström
Referee:
(Poland) Przemyslaw Kepa
Linesmen:
(Poland) Mariusz Smura
(Netherlands) Jeroen van den Berg

	0–1	03:16 – E. Alengard
	0–2	17:47 – P. Maack (B. Bergmann)
	0–3	23:53 – R. Hedström (E. Alengard, J. Gislason)
M. Kovačević (N. Vučurević) – 26:05	1–3
M. Kovačević (N. Vučurević, D. Filipović) – 40:25	2–3
N. Janković (M. Babić) – 46:00	3–3

M. Kovačević
N. Vučurević (miss)
N. Janković (miss)
M. Kovačević (miss)
M. Kovačević (miss)
N. Janković (miss)
Shootout
Ó. Björnsson
(miss) E. Alengard
(miss) J. Leifsson
(miss) Ó. Björnsson
(miss) B. Jakobsson
E. Alengard
12 min
Penalties
4 min
29
Shots
44

15 April 2014; 13:00	Estonia	6–1 (0–0, 4–1, 2–0)	Belgium	Pionir Ice Hall, Belgrade; Attendance: 305

Game reference

Mark Rajevski
Aleksandr Kolossov
Goalies
Bjorn Steijlen
Jean Cornelis
Referee:
(United Kingdom) Tom Darnell
Linesmen:
(Norway) Remi Aasum
(Serbia) David Parduv

A. Gornostajev (V. Bobkov) – 21:51	1–0
A. Gornostajev (A. Jastrebov, V. Titarenko) – 22:10	2–0
R. Rooba (L. Lahesalu, R. Andrejev) (PP) – 34:42	3–0
	3–1	35:47 – B. Kolodziejczyk (D. Swinnen, J. Paulus)
A. Makrov (R. Rooba, L. Lahesalu) – 38:59	4–1
R. Andrejev (R. Rooba) (PP) – 44:24	5–1
R. Rooba (A. Makrov, A. Sibirtsev) (PP) – 52:59	6–1

12 min
Penalties
20 min
51
Shots
23

15 April 2014; 16:30	Iceland	4–3 GWS (2–2, 0–1, 1–0) (OT 0–0) (SO: 1–0)	Israel	Pionir Ice Hall, Belgrade; Attendance: 368

Game reference

Dennis Hedström
Goalies
Avihu Sorotzki
Referee:
(Poland) Przemyslaw Kepa
Linesmen:
(Poland) Mariusz Smura
(Netherlands) Jeroen van den Berg

	0–1	04:44 – O. Eizenman (A. Eizenman)
E. Alengard (R. Pålsson) – 06:00	1–1
A. Helgason (J. Gislason, E. Alengard) – 07:48	2–1
	2–2	16:11 – D. Erlich (D. Mazour, E. Sherbatov)
	2–3	21:06 – D. Erlich (O. Eizenman, D. Mazour) (PP)
R. Hedström (E. Alengard) – 56:37	3–3

Ó. Björnsson (miss)
E. Alengard
Shootout
(miss) E. Sherbatov
(miss) D. Erlich
(miss) O. Eizenman
6 min
Penalties
2 min
37
Shots
32

15 April 2014; 20:00	Australia	0–1 (0–0, 0–0, 0–1)	Serbia	Pionir Ice Hall, Belgrade; Attendance: 1,100

Game reference
Anthony Kimlin	Goalies	Arsenije Ranković	Referee: (Slovenia) Luka Kamsek; Linesmen: (Romania) Adrian Toparceanu (Italy) David Tschirner
0–1 / 57:45 – N. Vučurević (D. Filipović)			Referee: (Slovenia) Luka Kamsek; Linesmen: (Romania) Adrian Toparceanu (Italy) David Tschirner
8 min	Penalties	8 min	Referee: (Slovenia) Luka Kamsek; Linesmen: (Romania) Adrian Toparceanu (Italy) David Tschirner
31	Shots	30	Referee: (Slovenia) Luka Kamsek; Linesmen: (Romania) Adrian Toparceanu (Italy) David Tschirner

=== Awards and statistics ===
==== Awards ====
- Best players selected by the directorate:
  - Best Goaltender: (Serbia) Arsenije Ranković
  - Best Defenceman: (Iceland) Ingvar Jönsson
  - Best Forward: (Estonia) Robert Rooba

Source: IIHF.com

==== Scoring leaders ====
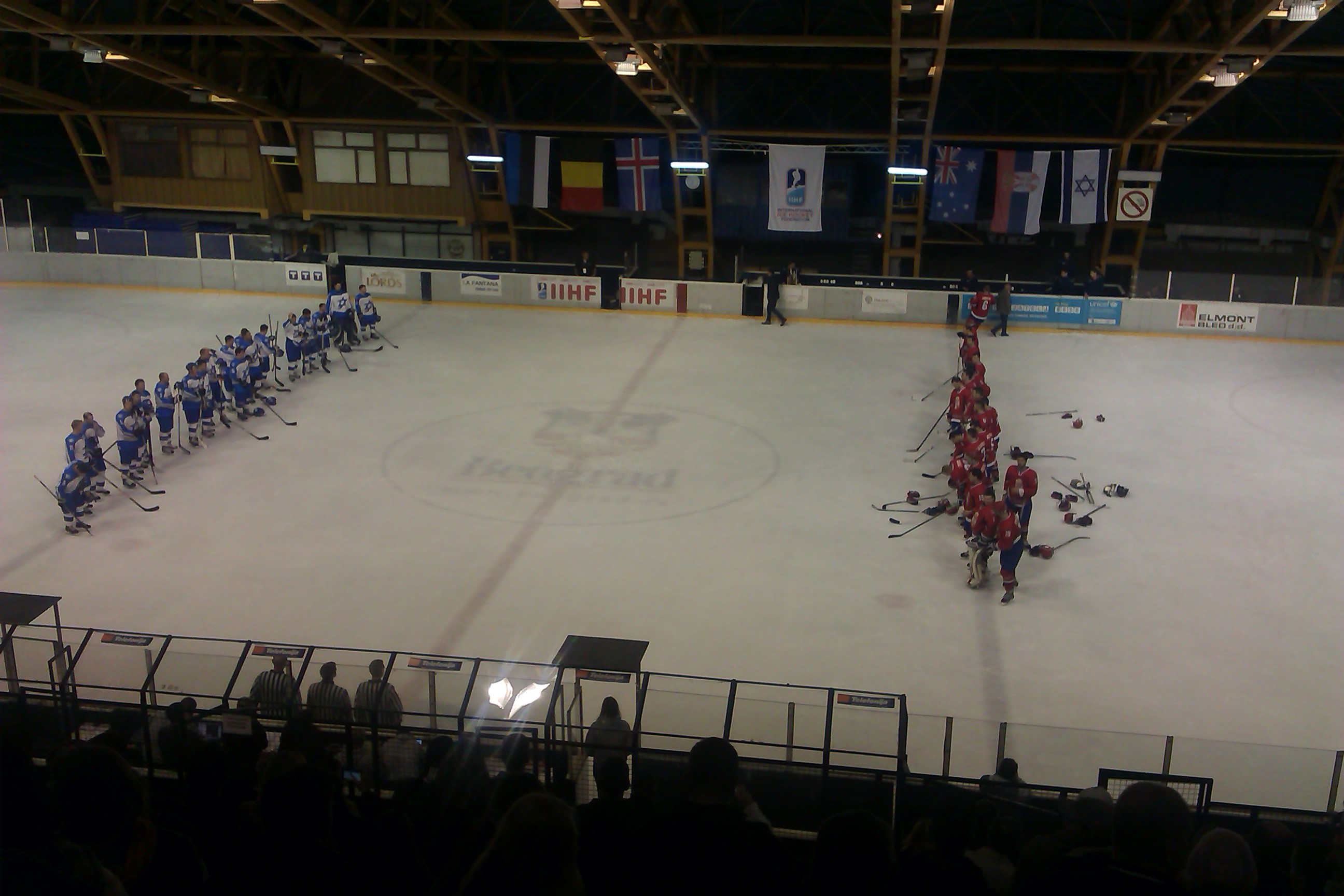
Serbia - Israel

List shows the top skaters sorted by points, then goals.

Player	GP	G	A	Pts	+/−	PIM	POS
(Estonia) Robert Rooba	5	6	8	14	+10	2	F
(Iceland) Emil Alengard	5	5	7	12	+5	0	F
(Serbia) Marko Kovačević	5	7	3	10	+3	2	F
(Estonia) Roman Andrejev	5	3	7	10	+10	4	F
(Israel) Daniel Erlich	5	2	8	10	−7	22	F
(Estonia) Artjom Gornostajev	5	5	4	9	+11	8	F
(Serbia) Nemanja Vučurević	5	5	4	9	−1	4	F
(Israel) Eliezer Sherbatov	5	3	6	9	−8	2	F
(Israel) Daniel Mazour	5	4	4	8	−7	8	F
(Israel) Oren Eizenman	5	3	5	8	−7	0	F

GP = Games played; G = Goals; A = Assists; Pts = Points; +/− = Plus/minus; PIM = Penalties in minutes; POS = Position
Source: IIHF.com

==== Leading goaltenders ====
Only the top five goaltenders, based on save percentage, who have played at least 40% of their team's minutes, are included in this list.

Player	TOI	GA	GAA	SA	Sv%	SO
(Australia) Anthony Kimlin	304:47	14	2.76	193	92.75	0
(Serbia) Arsenije Ranković	228:29	13	3.41	158	91.77	1
(Iceland) Dennis Hedström	311:00	15	2.89	172	91.28	0
(Estonia) Mark Rajevski	152:15	4	1.58	43	90.70	0
(Estonia) Aleksandr Kolossov	147:45	4	1.61	42	90.48	0

TOI = Time on ice (minutes:seconds); SA = Shots against; GA = Goals against; GAA = Goals against average; Sv% = Save percentage; SO = Shutouts
Source: IIHF.com

== Division II B ==
2014 IIHF World Championship Division II B

Tournament details
- Host country: Spain
- Venue: 1 (in 1 host city)
- Dates: 5–11 April
- Teams: 6

Tournament statistics
- Games played: 15
- Goals scored: 101 (6.73 per game)
- Attendance: 13,679 (912 per game)

=== Participants ===
Team	Qualification
Spain	Host Placed 6th in Division II A last year and was relegated.
New Zealand	Placed 2nd in Division II B last year.
Mexico	Placed 3rd in Division II B last year.
China	Placed 4th in Division II B last year.
Turkey	Placed 5th in Division II B last year.
South Africa	Placed 1st in Division III last year and was promoted.

=== Final standings ===
Team	Pld	W	OTW	OTL	L	GF	GA	GD	Pts	Promotion or relegation
Spain	5	5	0	0	0	29	5	+24	15	Promoted to the 2015 Division II A
Mexico	5	4	0	0	1	23	11	+12	12	
New Zealand	5	2	1	0	2	15	18	−3	8	
China	5	1	0	1	3	14	21	−7	4	
South Africa	5	1	0	0	4	8	19	−11	3	
Turkey	5	1	0	0	4	12	27	−15	3	Relegated to the 2015 Division III

Source: IIHF

=== Results ===
All times are local (UTC+2).

5 April 2014; 13:00	New Zealand	6–3 (2–2, 2–0, 2–1)	Turkey	Pabellón de Hielo, Jaca; Attendance: 120

Game reference

Jaden Pine-Murphy
Goalies
Erol Kahraman
Referee:
(Ukraine) Maxim Urda
Linesmen:
(Spain) Alejandro García
(Netherlands) Chris van Grinsven

	0–1	09:23 – A. Koçoğlu (S. Gümüş)
A. Cox (C. Huber, J. Hay) (PP) – 11:32	1–1
	1–2	16:07 – A. Koçoğlu (S. Gümüş, E. Faner)
L. Pickering (R. Lee, N. Henderson) – 19:20	2–2
J. Hay (A. Cox, R. Wilson) – 29:26	3–2
C. Burns (J. Chai, L. Pickering) – 30:18	4–2
A. Cox (N. Henderson) – 47:06	5–2
B. Haines (N. Henderson, L. Pickering) – 55:11	6–2
	6–3	58:25 – S. Aktürk (S. Semiz, E. Özmen)

12 min
Penalties
10 min
44
Shots
35

5 April 2014; 16:30	South Africa	1–4 (0–1, 0–1, 1–2)	China	Pabellón de Hielo, Jaca; Attendance: 450

Game reference

Ashley Bock
Goalies
Liu Zhiwei
Referee:
(Serbia) Djordje Fazekas
Linesmen:
(Croatia) Vanja Belić
(Spain) Rudy Meyer

	0–1	10:31 – Li Z. (Ji P.)
	0–2	37:25 – Zhang H. (Chen L., Wang C.)
	0–3	41:35 – Zhang C. (Fu T.)
P. Woolf – 50:39	1–3
	1–4	59:18 – Chen L. (ENG)

8 min
Penalties
6 min
17
Shots
39

5 April 2014; 20:30	Mexico	3–5 (0–1, 1–3, 2–1)	Spain	Pabellón de Hielo, Jaca; Attendance: 2,350

Game reference

Andres de la Garma
Goalies
Ander Alcaine
Referee:
(Italy) Michele Gastaldelli
Linesmen:
(Slovenia) Jan Cerne
(France) Yann Furet

	0–1	09:02 – O. Boronat (I. Gaínza, C. Quevedo)
	0–2	20:16 – P. González (C. Quevedo)
	0–3	25:33 – J. Muñoz (P. Muñoz, J. J. Palacín) (PP2)
	0–4	31:30 – P. Fuentes (A. Carbonell, J. J. Palacín)
H. Carrero (S. Sierra) – 35:05	1–4
H. Majul (PS) – 54:28	2–4
B. Arroyo (H. Majul) (EA) – 59:20	3–4
	3–5	59:44 – J. Muñoz (P. Muñoz, C. Quevedo)

12 min
Penalties
6 min
20
Shots
44

6 April 2014; 13:00	Turkey	2–4 (1–1, 1–2, 0–1)	South Africa	Pabellón de Hielo, Jaca; Attendance: 381

Game reference

Erol Kahraman
Goalies
Jack Nebe
Referee:
(Italy) Michele Gastaldelli
Linesmen:
(Latvia) Kriss Kupcus
(Spain) Rudy Meyer

	0–1	05:57 – W. Krotz (G. Miller)
F. Faner (S. Gümüş) – 13:54	1–1
A. Solak (G. Hamarat) – 22:36	2–1
	2–2	37:10 – M. Giot (C. Reeves)
	2–3	38:20 – U. Samaai (R. Forsyth)
	2–4	58:38 – U. Samaai (M. Giot)

8 min
Penalties
10 min
32
Shots
31

6 April 2014; 16:30	New Zealand	0–5 (0–1, 0–2, 0–2)	Mexico	Pabellón de Hielo, Jaca; Attendance: 600

Game reference

Michael Coleman
Goalies
Alfonso de Alba
Referee:
(Japan) Shinichi Takizawa
Linesmen:
(Slovenia) Jan Cerne
(Spain) Alejandro García

0–1	19:39 – C. Gómez (B. Arroyo, A. Cervantes)
0–2	24:17 – M. Escandón
0–3	39:50 – H. Majul (C. Gómez) (PP)
0–4	54:59 – H. Majul (A. Cervantes)
0–5	57:54 – E. Samperio (S. Ortega, C. Kelo)

14 min
Penalties
10 min
31
Shots
44

6 April 2014; 20:00	Spain	4–0 (1–0, 0–0, 3–0)	China	Pabellón de Hielo, Jaca; Attendance: 2,350

Game reference

Ander Alcaine
Goalies
Liu Zhiwei
Referee:
(Ukraine) Maksim Urda
Linesmen:
(Croatia) Vanja Belić
(Netherlands) Chris van Grinsven

O. Boronat (G. Betran) – 02:46	1–0
O. Boronat (C. Quevedo) – 52:40	2–0
P. Muñoz (J. Muñoz) – 54:08	3–0
G. Betran (J. J. Palacín, O. Boronat) (PP) – 56:51	4–0

12 min
Penalties
32 min
51
Shots
12

8 April 2014; 13:00	Mexico	7–4 (2–3, 3–1, 2–0)	China	Pabellón de Hielo, Jaca; Attendance: 180

Game reference

Alfonso de Alba
Goalies
Liu Zhiwei
Referee:
(Japan) Shinichi Takizawa
Linesmen:
(Croatia) Vanja Belić
(Spain) Alejandro García

D. González (C. Gómez, B. Arroyo) – 07:37	1–0
C. Gómez (B. Arroyo, J. Ramírez) – 12:36	2–0
	2–1	16:58 – Xia T. (Bao J.)
	2–2	17:56 – Chen L. (Wang C.) (SH)
	2–3	19:51 – Zhang C. (Xia T, Bao J.)
	2–4	21:55 – Liu Q. (Xia T.) (PP)
M. Colas (H. Majul) – 26:54	3–4
H. Majul (M. Colas, A. Cervantes) – 27:34	4–4
C. Kelo (J. Ehlers) – 31:17	5–4
B. Arroyo (M. Escandón, J. Ramírez) – 45:28	6–4
A. Cervantes (F. Ugarte) (ENG) – 57:48	7–4

6 min
Penalties
10 min
39
Shots
19

8 April 2014; 16:30	New Zealand	4–2 (0–2, 1–0, 3–0)	South Africa	Pabellón de Hielo, Jaca; Attendance: 300

Game reference

Michael Coleman
Goalies
Jack Nebe
Referee:
(Ukraine) Maxim Urda
Linesmen:
(Slovenia) Jan Cerne
(Spain) Rudy Meyer

	0–1	07:44 – G. Miller (U. Samaai)
	0–2	16:21 – U. Samaai (C. Birrell, J. Valadas)
J. Hay – 39:19	1–2
A. Cox (C. Huber, R. Wilson) – 44:59	2–2
A. Cox (C. Huber, N. Henderson) – 49:48	3–2
A. Cox (ENG) – 59:53	4–2

8 min
Penalties
8 min
31
Shots
20

8 April 2014; 20:00	Spain	8–0 (2–0, 3–0, 3–0)	Turkey	Pabellón de Hielo, Jaca; Attendance: 2,100

Game reference

Ander Alcaine
Aaron Carretero
Goalies
Erol Kahraman
Levent Ozbaydugan
Referee:
(Serbia) Djordje Fazekas
Linesmen:
(France) Yann Furet
(Latvia) Kriss Kupcus

J. J. Palacín (G. Betran) (PP) – 15:30	1–0
P. Puyuelo (A. Ubieto, S. Barnola) – 15:39	2–0
O. Boronat (P. Muñoz, J. J. Palacín) (PP) – 26:04	3–0
J. J. Palacín (S. Barnola, P. Puyuelo) – 31:02	4–0
G. Betran (J. García-Arias, A. Betran) – 34:26	5–0
C. Quevedo (O. Boronat) – 41:48	6–0
O. Boronat (S. Barnola) (PP) – 49:41	7–0
J. Muñoz (P. Muñoz, A. Ubieto) (PP) – 59:54	8–0

33 min
Penalties
34 min
48
Shots
15

9 April 2014; 13:00	China	2–3 OT (2–1, 0–0, 0–1) (OT: 0–1)	New Zealand	Pabellón de Hielo, Jaca; Attendance: 210

Game reference

Liu Zhiwei
Goalies
Jaden Pine-Murphy
Referee:
(Serbia) Djordje Fazekas
Linesmen:
(France) Yann Furet
(Netherlands) Chris van Grinsven

	0–1	07:05 – A. Cox (J. Hay) (PP)
Zhang H. (Liu L., Hu T.) (PP) – 09:01	1–1
Chen L. (Hu T.) – 17:52	2–1
	2–2	57:40 – A. Cox (C. Huber, J. Hay) (PP)
	2–3	60:11 – A. Cox (C. Huber)

14 min
Penalties
14 min
45
Shots
27

9 April 2014; 16:30	Turkey	1–5 (0–2, 1–0, 0–3)	Mexico	Pabellón de Hielo, Jaca; Attendance: 150

Game reference

Erol Kahraman
Goalies
Andres de la Garma
Referee:
(Italy) Michele Gastaldelli
Linesmen:
(Croatia) Vanja Belić
(Spain) Alejandro García

	0–1	09:37 – J. Ehlers (C. Kelo, C. Gómez)
	0–2	17:33 – A. Cervantes (S. Sierra)
An. Kocoglu (A. Solak) – 21:25	1–2
	1–3	40:16 – S. Sierra (M. Escandon, A. Cervantes)
	1–4	44:45 – M. Escandon (S. Sierra)
	1–5	58:14 – C. Gómez (B. Arroyo)

41 min
Penalties
12 min
22
Shots
39

9 April 2014; 20:00	South Africa	0–6 (0–1, 0–2, 0–3)	Spain	Pabellón de Hielo, Jaca; Attendance: 1,850

Game reference

Ashley Bock
Goalies
Ander Alcaine
Referee:
(Japan) Shinichi Takizawa
Linesmen:
(Slovenia) Jan Cerne
(Latvia) Kriss Kupcus

0–1	03:32 – P. Muñoz (J. Muñoz, C. Quevedo)
0–2	24:15 – P. Muñoz (G. Betran, J. J. Palacín)
0–3	37:50 – C. Quevedo (J. J. Palacín)
0–4	43:10 – A. Betran (A. Carbonell, M. Ribas)
0–5	48:00 – P. Puyuelo (O. Boronat)
0–6	51:33 – O. Boronat (S. Barnola)

10 min
Penalties
2 min
8
Shots
42

11 April 2014; 13:00	Mexico	3–1 (0–0, 1–0, 2–1)	South Africa	Pabellón de Hielo, Jaca; Attendance: 138

Game reference

Andres de la Garma
Goalies
Jack Nebe
Referee:
(Serbia) Djordje Fazekas
Linesmen:
(France) Yann Furet
(Spain) Alejandro García

A. Cervantes (H. Majul) – 24:06	1–0
	1–1	47:40 – U. Samaai (A. Marais)
M. Escandón (M. Colas) (PP) – 50:04	2–1
B. Arroyo (C. Gómez) – 56:07	3–1

10 min
Penalties
10 min
38
Shots
13

11 April 2014; 16:30	China	4–6 (1–3, 3–3, 0–0)	Turkey	Pabellón de Hielo, Jaca; Attendance: 150

Game reference

Liu Zhiwei
Goalies
Levent Ozbaydugan
Referee:
(Japan) Shinichi Takizawa
Linesmen:
(Slovenia) Jan Cerne
(Spain) Rudy Meyer

	0–1	11:08 – A. Koçoğlu (Y. Halil)
Liu Q. (Zhang C.) (PP) – 14:30	1–1
	1–2	18:14 – S. Semiz (G. Solak) (PP)
	1–3	19:49 – A. Koçoğlu (S. Semiz)
	1–4	21:05 – G. Hamarat (G. Solak)
Liu Q. (Zhang C.) – 23:17	2–4
	2–5	24:35 – E. Coşkun (S. Semiz, G. Hamarat)
	2–6	26:59 – S. Aktürk
Bao J. (Zhang C., Fu T.) – 36:54	3–6
Xia T. (Zhang C.) – 38:51	4–6

10 min
Penalties
6 min
42
Shots
41

11 April 2014; 20:00	Spain	6–2 (1–1, 4–1, 1–0)	New Zealand	Pabellón de Hielo, Jaca; Attendance: 2,350

Game reference

Aaron Carretero
Goalies
Michael Coleman
Jaden Pine-Murphy
Referee:
(Ukraine) Maxim Urda
Linesmen:
(Latvia) Kriss Kupcus
(Netherlands) Chris van Grinsven

J. J. Palacín (C. Quevedo) – 03:44	1–0
	1–1	05:01 – A. Cox (SH)
A. Ubieto (P. Fuentes, I. Solorzano) (PP) – 21:02	2–1
O. Boronat (I. Solorzano, G. Betran) – 28:31	3–1
A. Betran (J. García-Arias, A. Hernández) – 29:15	4–1
	4–2	34:05 – M. Frear (N. Henderson, C. Huber)
O. Boronat (J. J. Palacín, G. Betran) (PP) – 35:46	5–2
O. Boronat (P. Fuentes, I. Solorzano) – 44:39	6–2

14 min
Penalties
34 min
66
Shots
23

=== Awards and statistics ===
==== Awards ====
- Best players selected by the directorate:
  - Best Goaltender: (Spain) Ander Alcaine
  - Best Defenceman: (Spain) Juan José Palacín
  - Best Forward: (Spain) Oriol Boronat

Source: IIHF.com

==== Scoring leaders ====
List shows the top skaters sorted by points, then goals.

Player	GP	G	A	Pts	+/−	PIM	POS
(Spain) Oriol Boronat	5	9	2	12	+9	2	F
(New Zealand) Andrew Cox	5	9	1	10	+1	0	F
(Spain) Juan José Palacín	5	3	7	10	+10	4	D
(Spain) Carlos Quevedo	5	2	6	8	+9	2	F
(New Zealand) Charlie Huber	5	0	8	8	+3	2	F
(Mexico) Héctor Majul	5	4	3	7	+5	6	F
(Mexico) Brian Arroyo	5	3	4	7	+3	2	F
(Mexico) Adrian Cervantes	5	3	4	7	+5	4	F
(Mexico) Carlos Gómez	5	3	4	7	+5	0	F
(Spain) Pablo Muñoz	5	3	4	7	+3	0	F

GP = Games played; G = Goals; A = Assists; Pts = Points; +/− = Plus/minus; PIM = Penalties in minutes; POS = Position
Source: IIHF.com

==== Leading goaltenders ====
Only the top five goaltenders, based on save percentage, who have played at least 40% of their team's minutes, are included in this list.

Player	TOI	GA	GAA	SA	Sv%	SO
(Spain) Ander Alcaine	220:00	3	0.82	49	93.88	2
(New Zealand) Jaden Pine-Murphy	150:25	7	2.79	110	93.64	0
(South Africa) Jack Nebe	178:18	8	2.69	101	92.08	0
(Mexico) Andres de la Garma	150:40	6	2.39	75	92.00	0
(Mexico) Alfonso de Alba	149:08	5	2.01	54	90.74	1

TOI = Time on ice (minutes:seconds); SA = Shots against; GA = Goals against; GAA = Goals against average; Sv% = Save percentage; SO = Shutouts
Source: IIHF.com
