= 4 Decembar Nikšić =

Bus company in Montenegro

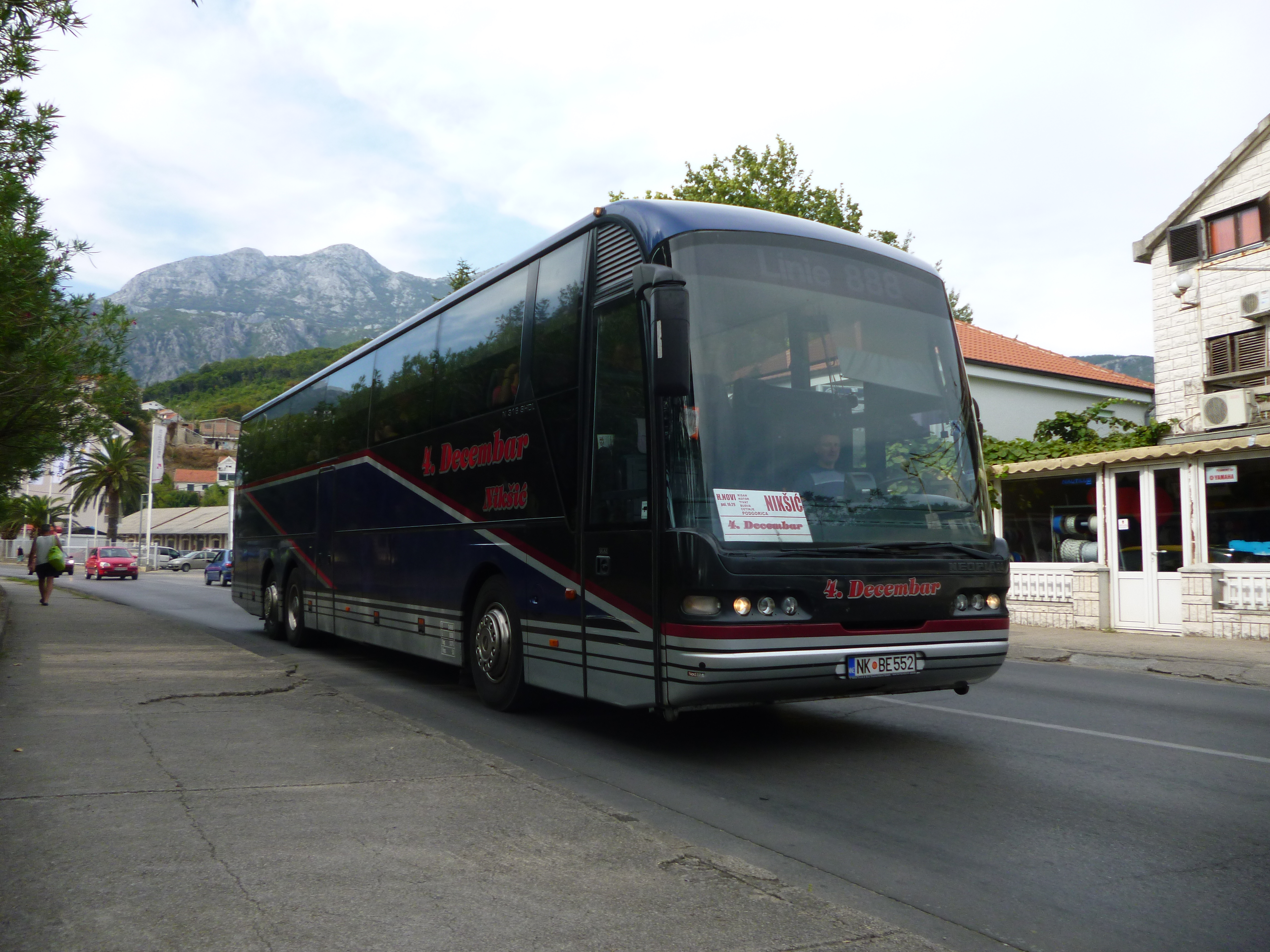
- A "4. Decembar" bus in Zelenika, Montenegro.
- Headquarters: Nikšić, Montenegro
- Locale: Montenegro
- Service area: Former Yugoslavia, Europe
- Service type: Intercity and international coach service
- Hubs: Nikšić

4. Decembar Nikšić (English: December 4th) is an intercity bus company based in Nikšić, Montenegro. With a fleet of coach buses, the company operates intercity routes to various destinations in Montenegro as well as in Bosnia and Herzegovina and Serbia. It was named after the date in 1943 when Josip Broz Tito and the Yugoslav Partisans declared government-in-exile during the occupation of Yugoslavia in World War II. Along with Glušica Nikšić, the carrier is one of the main intercity bus companies serving the Nikšić municipality.

== Destinations ==
The line operated between Nikšić to Podgorica is operated with many frequencies on a daily basis, while other domestic destinations, including Danilovgrad, Herceg Novi, and Kotor are served as well.
