= Pandurica =

- Пандурица
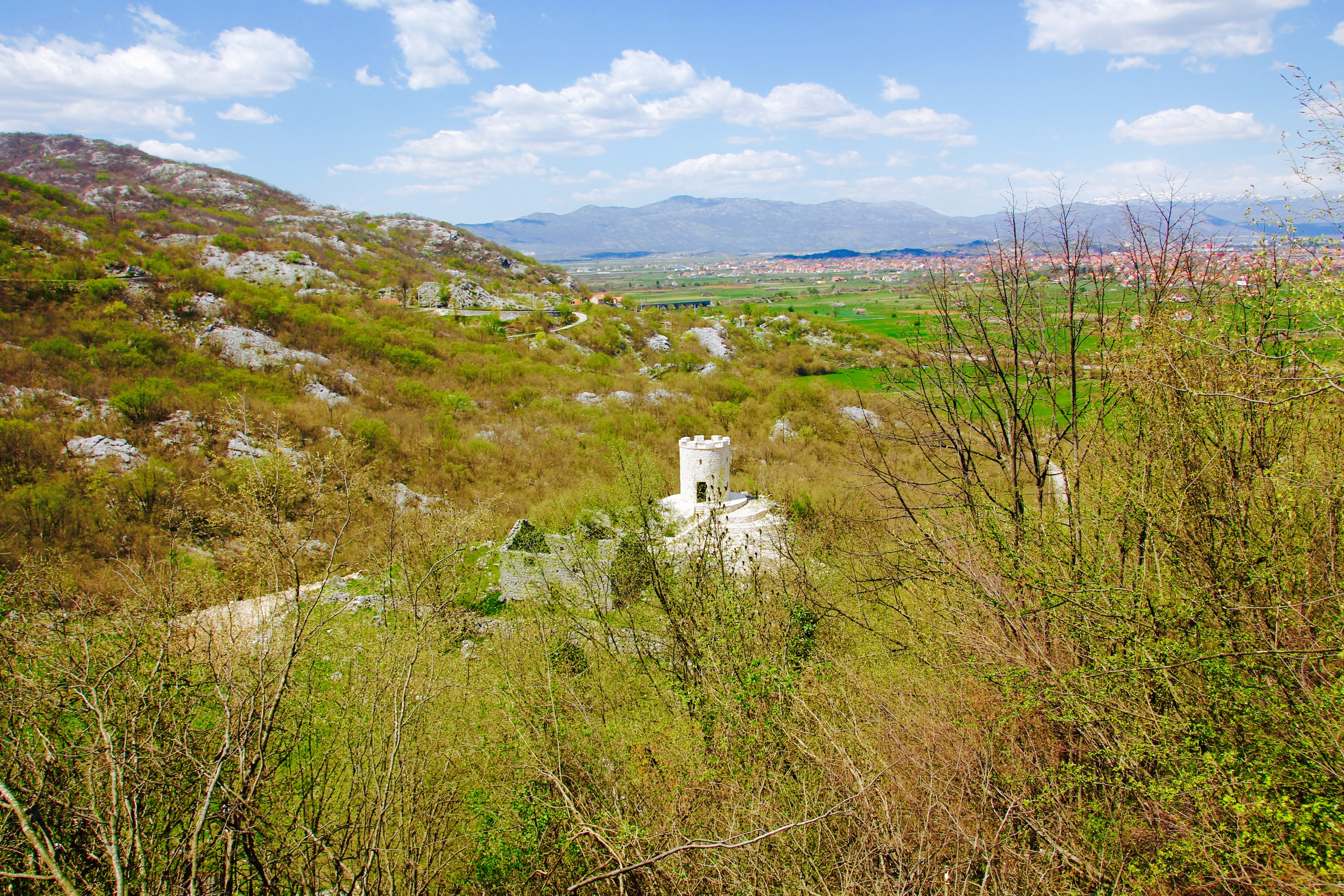
- 2015 photo
- Interactive map of Pandurica
- Location: Nikšić, Montenegro
- Coordinates: 42.7241°N 18.9708°E
- Beginning date: 1367

Pandurica (Serbian: Пандурица) is an ancient castle in Montenegro to the south of Nikšić town. It is situated in a hilly area of the same name on the bank of the river Zeta. It is a cultural monument of national significance.

== History ==
The castle was originally built in 1367 by Stracimir Balšić, the Lord of Zeta principality. The area of Pandurica belonged then to Upper Zeta region of the principality, and in 1362 it was included in Balšić family possession. The Pandurica castle, which was named after the area, began to be used to control mountain trail and Zeta river ford.

In 1473 Upper Zeta was granted by ruler Ivan Crnojević to his duke called Bodgan, who was the founder and leader of Pješivci tribe. The southern rim of Nikšić valley along Zeta served as border between land of tribe's Nikcevici family and Ottoman Empire, which occupied land around Nikšić (then-called Onogošt). Trade route was established between the lands, and Pandurica castle was then used to control this route. Turks were attacking the castle regularly, but it was re-built each time. There are suggestions that the area near castle was actively re-constructed between 1500 and 1600. In the 16th century the Ostrog Monastery was founded in south-eastern mountains along the trail; so Pandurica castle begun to serve as a security cordon for the monastery.

In 1877 Niksic town was liberated from Turks by the forces of Prince Nikola Petrović-Njegoš (later the King). In 1878 Old Herzegovina was adjoined to Montenegro by demand of Russia. To connect new territories to mainland Montenegro and its capital Podgorica, it was decided to build a new road and construct a bridge over Zeta in about 1 km near Pandurica castle. The river was very wide there, so the bridge turned to be very lengthy. Prince Nikola asked Russian Emperor Alexander III for help: he agreed and assigned resources to build the road, that went near the castle, and to construct the massive 18-span monumental bridge, the Carev Most, now considered one of Montenegro's main landmarks.

As of 2014, the castle and adjacent territories still belonged to Nikcevici family of Pješivci tribe. Nowadays archaeological and restoration works are underway in the castle. Year 2017 will mark Pandurica's 650th anniversary.
