= Milosava Perunović =

Montenegrin gymnast

Milosava Perunović (ca. 1900 – 1945) was a Montenegrin gymnast who, following the capitulation of Montenegro in 1916, joined the committees and fought against the occupiers until the end of World War I.

== Biography ==
Milosava Perunović was born in Nikšić, ca. 1900. She was a schoolgirl when Montenegro capitulated in 1916 and she joined the irregulars fighting against the occupying forces. When she joined the irregulars, she did not hide the fact that she was a girl, but, nevertheless, until the end of the war she fought using the male name of "Milosav". She was known for her exceptional bravery and her gun “made every enemy tremble”. While she was fighting, her father, mother and three brothers were in a prisoner camp in Austria.

Three years after the end of World War I, Perunović received seven parcels of land in the village of Zednik, near Subotica, in gratitude for her voluntary participation in the war. She built a house on that land, and worked at the railway station as a cashier.

At the start of World War II, she was forced to flee from Zednik with her family. The priest Dragomir Mijuskovic gave them part of a house to live in. As soon as the Germans were expelled, Perunović decided to return to the Zednik. In the winter of 1945, she started walking through the Čakor area. At the top of Cakor, she was shot in the back by a bullet. She managed to arrive at a hospital in Peć, but after a few days, succumbed to her wound, managing only to say: "I perished from the pagan arm ..."
