= Kapino Polje Airport =

Kapino Polje Airport / Nikšić Airport Aerodrom Kapino Polje
- IATA: none; ICAO: LYNK

Summary
- Location: Nikšić, Montenegro
- Elevation AMSL: 2,026 ft / 617 m
- Coordinates: 42°46′27.55″N 18°54′54.42″E
- Interactive map of Kapino Polje Airport / Nikšić Airport

Runways
Direction	Length		Surface
Direction	ft	m	Surface
15/33	4,757	1,450	Asphalt

Nikšić Airport (Montenegrin: Аеродром Никшић / Aerodrom Nikšić) (ICAO: LYNK) is a sport airport located near Nikšić, Montenegro.

== History ==
The airport was built as a small airstrip with one grass runway during the Kingdom of Yugoslavia. On 14 April 1941, King Peter II of Yugoslavia used the airfield to leave the country, escaping the Axis powers invasion. In Sept 1948, it was used as a stop for transfer of first 6 Spitfires from Czechoslovakia to Israel, thus playing a small role in 1948 Arab–Israeli War. During the SFRY era, the airport was a notable parachuting training center.

After the breakup of Yugoslavia, the airport fell into disuse, serving mostly as a glider airstrip for enthusiasts in the local aviation club. The airport was chosen to be a host of 2010 FAI World Parachuting Championships, and its runway was asphalted, with length increased to 1,450m. With this latest upgrade, it is expected that the airport receives status of an international airport, so it can cater to the needs of general aviation.

== Passenger airport ==
Currently there is no passenger terminal and no scheduled air traffic at the Niksic airport. This is the second largest municipality in Montenegro, it could have a working passenger airport. Construction of the airport Kapino Polje in Niksic is in progress. Local authorities expect to finish construction of the control tower and administration building soon. They hope that they will find a suitable partner and equip the airport for traffic in the near future.
