= Alon Eizenman =

Canadian-Israeli ice hockey player (born 1979)

- Born: February 9, 1979 (age 47) Toronto, Ontario, Canada
- Height: 6 ft 0 in (183 cm)
- Weight: 176 lb (80 kg; 12 st 8 lb)
- Position: Centre
- Shot: Left
- Played for: Haifa Hawks (Israel); Diables Noirs de Tours (France)
- National team: Israel
- NHL draft: Undrafted
- Playing career: 2000–2007

Alon Eizenman (Hebrew: אלון אייזנמן; born February 9, 1979) is a Canadian and Israeli former ice hockey player. He played club hockey for the Nittany Lions at Pennsylvania State University, then played professionally in France and on the Israeli national team in 2000, 2001, 2002, 2005, and 2006 Ice Hockey World Championships.

Eizenman earned a Bachelor of Science from Pennsylvania State University in 2001, and a Juris Doctor from the University of Toronto in 2007.

== Hockey career ==
In secondary school, Eizenman played for the Wexford Raiders. Eizenman played for Canada in the Maccabiah Games while still in secondary school.

Eizenman played for Penn State as an undergraduate from 1997 to 2001 under coach Joe Battista. He led Penn State to 4 ACHA national championships. In 2000 he scored 16 minutes into overtime, to beat Eastern Michigan for the ACHA Division I Championship. In 2001 he scored 2 goals and was named MVP of the game in which Penn State beat Delaware for the national championship.

In 2012 he was named to the American Collegiate Hockey Association (ACHA) Hall of Fame.

Said to have maintained a "dizzying(ly)" high grade point average as an undergraduate, Eizenman postponed law school for a professional career that began with a tryout with the Pittsburgh Penguins.

He was described in the Sydney Morning Herald as the "hero" of Israel's victory over Australia in the 2014 Ice Hockey Division IIA World Championships, for "scoring with just 16 seconds remaining in the overtime period to win the game."

== Post-sports life ==
Eizenman is a lawyer with the Canadian law firm of Stikeman Elliott, specializing in municipal and planning law.

== Family ==
Eizenman's father is Moshe Eizenman, a professor at the University of Toronto. He is the brother of ice hockey players Oren and Erez Eizenman, all three of whom have played for the Israeli national team.

== See also ==
- List of select Jewish ice hockey players
