= Tsar's Bridge, Nikšić =

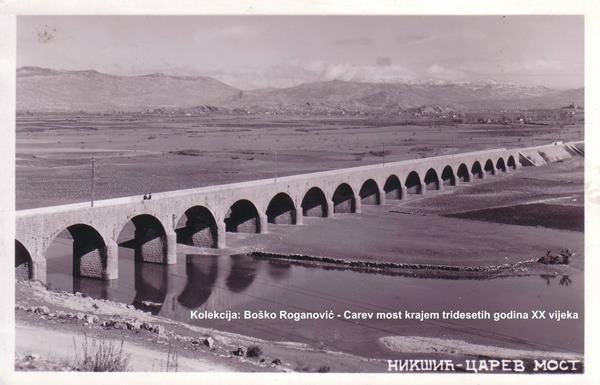
- The bridge in 1930s
- Interactive map of Tsar's Bridge, Nikšić
- Location: Nikšić, Montenegro
- Coordinates: 42°43′52″N 18°57′37″E
- Designer: Josip Slade
- Beginning date: 1894

The Tsar's Bridge (Serbian: Царев мост, romanized: Carev most) is a monumental historical bridge near Nikšić, Montenegro. It is a major state-protected landmark despite being not actively used nowadays.

== Overview ==
The Tsar's Bridge is named after the Russian Emperor Alexander III, who financed the construction of the bridge in the year 1894. It crosses the Zeta river and its valley. It is remarkable for its significant length (270 m) and many spans (18). The highest span measures 13 meters. The bridge is much wider than the modern river channel, this is due to the presence of a large backwater pool that existed in the past, which was drained in the 20th century. Nowadays, the river's channel is straightened and strengthened by concrete in the area, so only one span actually crosses the river. Under the highest bridge span exists a little pedestrian doubling bridge.

A local road passes by the bridge, it connects Nikšić to the north and mountainous and rural areas to the south with places such as Pandurica castle and Ostrog Monastery. The road's general direction is similar to more modern European route E762 and Nikšić–Podgorica railway. They are situated slightly to the west and go through mountains via several tunnels. The northern end of the bridge's road is connected to the mound ~12 m high and ~600 m long, which connects to the southern suburbs of Nikšić.

== History ==
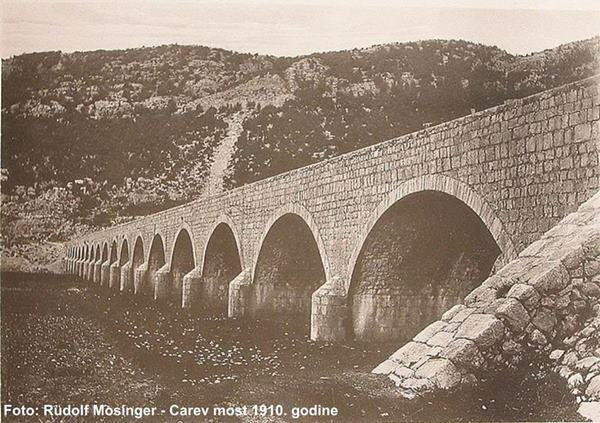
1910 photo by Rudolf Mosinger

The bridge, made of hewn stones, was constructed in the area called Slivlje in 1894 under the ruling of Montenegrin prince Nikola Petrović-Njegoš (later the King), who was in good relations with Russian Romanov dynasty. In 1877 Niksic was liberated from Turks, and in 1878 Old Herzegovina was adjoined to Montenegro by demand of Russia according to Treaty of Berlin. Prince Nikola wanted to securely connect newly acquired Nikšić area to the rest of the country. He asked Russian Emperor Alexander III for help to build a road to Podgorica, and the bridge: the Emperor agreed and assigned necessary amount of grain for that. The project became the Montenegro's biggest at the time, and it was developed by famed architect Josip Slade from Trogir. The construction had begun on May 23, 1894 with participation of State Council head Bojo Petrović-Njegoš. The chief constructor was Miloš Lepetić, the works were accomplished by commercial builders and by the military. Prince Nikola ordered that each pillar of the bridge contained a gold coin within. The construction was completed in record 6-month period. The day of the opening, October 20, 1894, coincided with the day of the death of Alexander III. The bridge got the official name "The bridge of Tsar Alexander III". Initially there was a large backwater in the Zeta river valley, that's why the bridge became so long. In the 20th century the backwater was drained, the river channel was straightened, the banks were strengthened by concrete. Only one span crossed the river actually from then on; and a small pedestrian bridge was constructed there right under that span.
