= Glušica Nikšić =

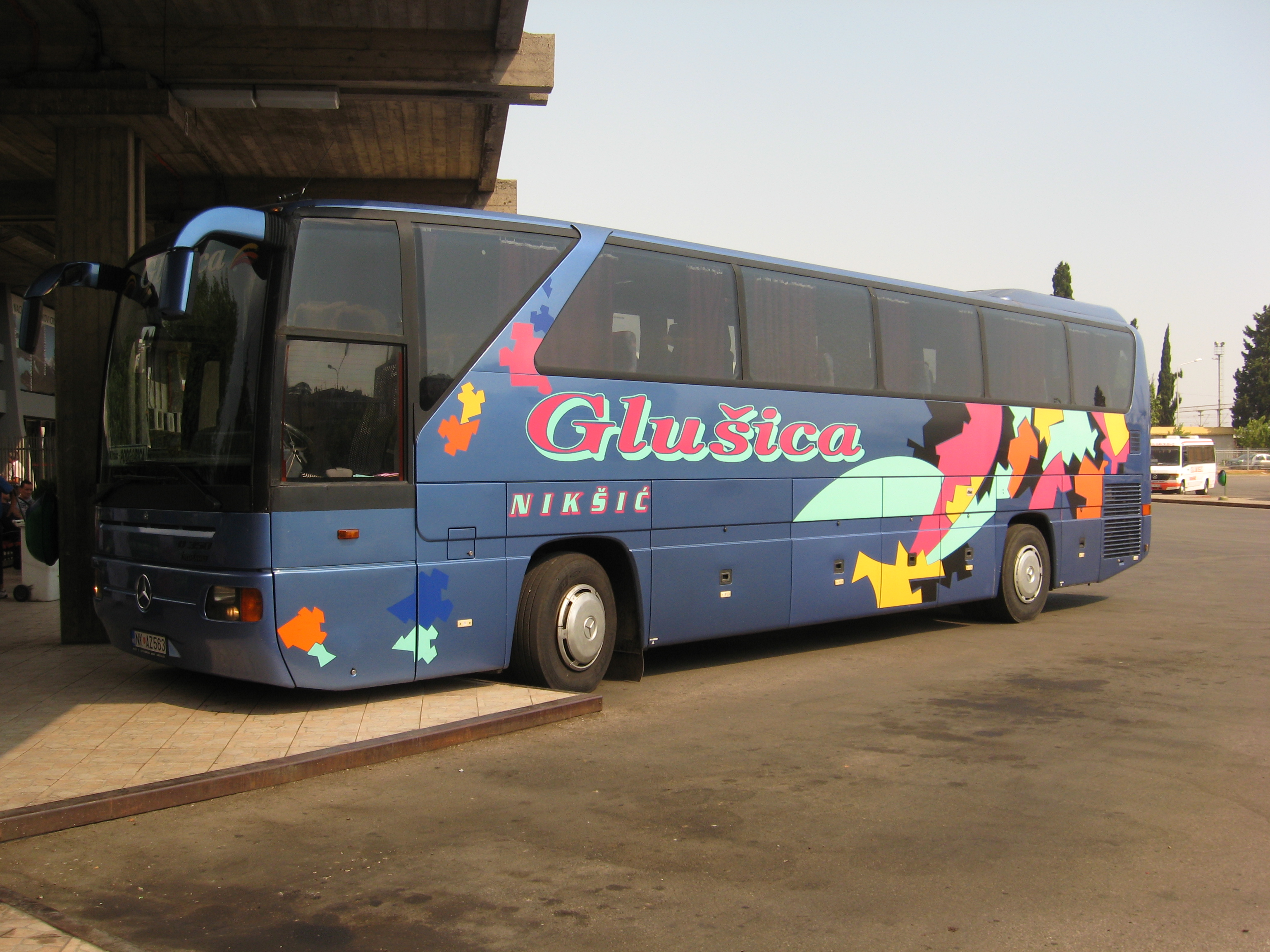
- A Glušica bus in Podgorica, Montenegro.
- Headquarters: Nikšić, Montenegro
- Locale: Montenegro
- Service area: Former Yugoslavia, Europe
- Service type: Intercity and international coach service
- Hubs: Nikšić

Glušica Nikšić is an intercity bus company based in Nikšić, Montenegro. With a fleet of coach buses, the company operates within the Nikšić municipality as well as to international destinations in Bosnia and Herzegovina and Serbia.

== Incidents ==
- On July 7, 2012, a group of five young men (two of which were 17 years old) were arrested for stealing a Glušica bus, during which time, they drove it out of the company's bus lot in Nikšić and struck a large rock before returning the bus to the location it was found at.
