= Marko Kovačević =

Montenegrin politician

Marko Kovačević Марко Ковачевић
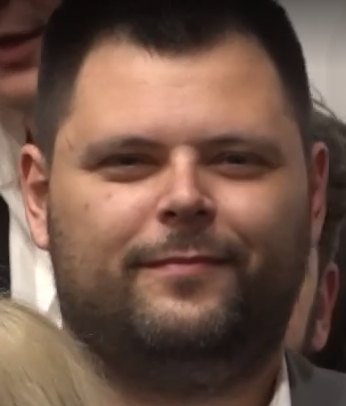
- Marko Kovačević in April 2023

Mayor of Nikšić
- Incumbent
- Assumed office 10 May 2021
- Preceded by: Milutin Simović

Member of Parliament
- In office 23 September 2020 – 10 May 2021
- President: Aleksa Bečić

Personal details
- Born: 9 May 1988 (age 38) Nikšić, SFR Yugoslavia (now Montenegro)
- Party: New Serb Democracy
- Education: University of Montenegro
- Occupation: Politician

Marko Kovačević (Serbian Cyrillic: Марко Ковачевић; born 9 May 1988) is a Montenegrin Serb politician serving as the mayor of Nikšić since 10 May 2021 and the spokesperson of the New Serb Democracy. Prior to this he was a member of the Parliament of Montenegro.

== Biography ==
=== Early life and education ===
Kovačević was born on 9 May 1988 to a Montenegrin Serb family in Nikšić, at that time part of SR Montenegro and SFR Yugoslavia. He graduated from the Faculty of Law at the University of Montenegro.

=== Political career ===
After graduating from the University of Montenegro, Kovačević joined the New Serb Democracy, an ethnic Serb political party in Montenegro and became a member of the Municipal Assembly of Nikšić in two convocations and member of the Committee for Statute and Regulations of the Municipal Assembly of Nikšić. He also serves as the spokesperson of the party.

In 2019, Kovačević attended the unveiling and consecration of the monument to the Chetnik leader Draža Mihailović in Ravna Gora Park in Bileća, Republika Srpska, Bosnia and Herzegovina.

During the 2019-2020 clerical protests in Montenegro, Kovačević was arrested in Nikšić for waving a Serb tricolor. Kovačević received the 22nd position on the For the Future of Montenegro electoral list for the 2020 Montenegrin parliamentary elections and was elected member of the Parliament of Montenegro. Following the confirmation of his MP mandate, Kovačević was elected president of the Parliamentary Legislative Committee, member of the Committee on Education, Science, Culture and Sports, and member the Anti-Corruption Committee. Kovačević's opponents have labelled him a Serbian nationalist, a supporter of the Greater Serbia project and a follower of the Chetnik ideology. He was a ballot holder of the For the Future of Nikšić coalition (DF-SNP) at the 2021 Nikšić municipal elections as the coalition's mayor candidate. On 10 May 2021, he was elected Mayor of Nikšić, replacing Milutin Simović.
