= Oren Eizenman =

Israeli-Canadian ice hockey player

Oren Eizenman אורן אייזנמן
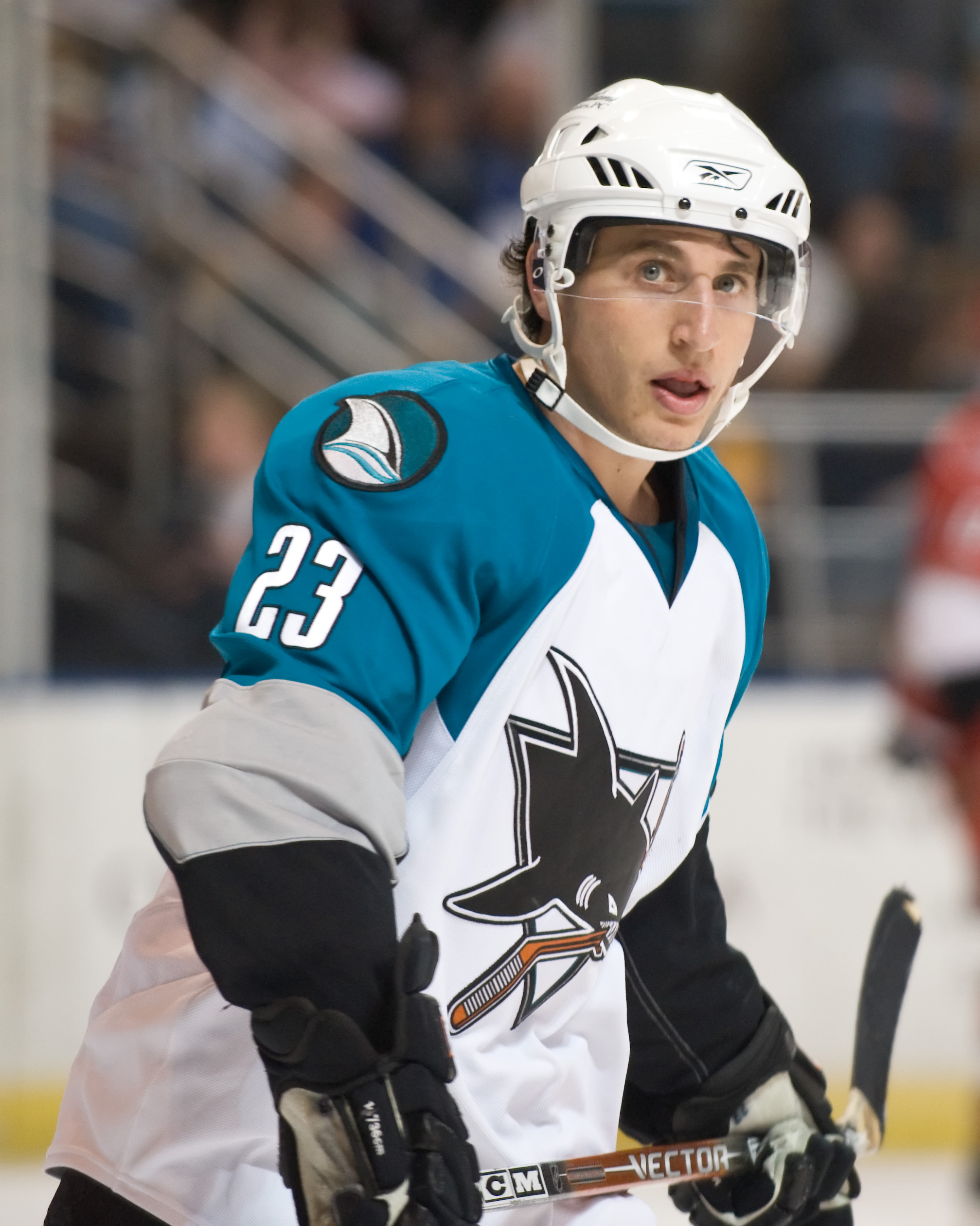
- Eizenman with the Worcester Sharks in 2007
- Born: March 27, 1985 (age 41) Toronto, Ontario, Canada
- Height: 6 ft 0 in (183 cm)
- Weight: 187 lb (85 kg; 13 st 5 lb)
- Position: Centre
- Shot: Left
- Played for: Fresno Falcons; Milwaukee Admirals; Worcester Sharks; Manitoba Moose; San Antonio Rampage; Syracuse Crunch; Hartford Wolf Pack; Connecticut Whale; High1; Nippon Paper Cranes
- National team: Israel
- NHL draft: Undrafted
- Playing career: 2007–2013

Oren Eizenman (Hebrew: אורן אייזנמן; born March 27, 1985) is an Israeli-Canadian former professional ice hockey player. He last played for the Nippon Paper Cranes in the Asia League Ice Hockey (ALIH).

== Biography ==
Eizenman was born in Toronto, Canada, to Ronit and Moshe Eizenman, and is Jewish. He spent some of his childhood living in a suburb of Tel Aviv. His father is a University of Toronto professor and an expert on eye tracking, and his mother is a teacher. He is the brother of ice hockey players Alon (now a lawyer) and Erez Eizenman (now a management consultant), all three of whom have played for the Israeli national team.

Eizenman played hockey for the Wexford Raiders in the Ontario Provincial Junior Hockey League (OPJHL). He played two years on the varsity hockey team at Community Hebrew Academy of Toronto.

He played college hockey for RPI. As a freshman in 2003-04, he was seventh in the ECAC in freshmen scoring, was named to the ECAC Weekly Honor Roll twice, was ECAC Rookie of the Week once, and was named to the ECAC All-Rookie Team. In 2005-06 he was ECACHL Weekly Honor Roll four times, and ECACHL All-Academic. In 2006-07, he was ECACHL Weekly Honor Roll and ECACHL All-Academic.

Eizenman's professional career began with the Fresno Falcons of the ECHL. He would spend most of his career between that league and the AHL before finishing his career in Asia.

== Career statistics ==
=== Regular season and playoffs ===
			Regular season					Playoffs
Season	Team	League	GP	G	A	Pts	PIM	GP	G	A	Pts	PIM
2002–03	Wexford Raiders	OPJHL	47	25	32	57	8	—	—	—	—	—
2003–04	R.P.I.	ECAC	37	6	12	18	12	—	—	—	—	—
2004–05	R.P.I.	ECAC	27	6	14	20	8	—	—	—	—	—
2005–06	R.P.I.	ECAC	37	16	22	38	33	—	—	—	—	—
2006–07	R.P.I.	ECAC	28	9	14	23	37	—	—	—	—	—
2007–08	Fresno Falcons	ECHL	53	27	39	66	28	6	4	1	5	2
2007–08	Milwaukee Admirals	AHL	1	0	0	0	0	—	—	—	—	—
2007–08	Worcester Sharks	AHL	7	0	1	1	4	—	—	—	—	—
2008–09	Manitoba Moose	AHL	6	0	0	0	2	—	—	—	—	—
2008–09	Fresno Falcons	ECHL	12	3	10	13	10	—	—	—	—	—
2008–09	San Antonio Rampage	AHL	5	0	2	2	2	—	—	—	—	—
2008–09	Stockton Thunder	ECHL	2	0	1	1	4	—	—	—	—	—
2008–09	Milwaukee Admirals	AHL	20	2	3	5	0	4	0	1	1	4
2009–10	Stockton Thunder	ECHL	61	21	38	59	61	15	3	16	19	4
2009–10	Milwaukee Admirals	AHL	7	0	1	1	2	—	—	—	—	—
2010–11	Elmira Jackals	ECHL	20	7	16	23	48	1	0	0	0	0
2010–11	Syracuse Crunch	AHL	3	0	0	0	0	—	—	—	—	—
2010–11	Hartford Wolf Pack/CT Whale	AHL	33	4	2	6	6	—	—	—	—	—
2011–12	High1	AL	36	22	41	63	54	—	—	—	—	—
2012–13	Nippon Paper Cranes	AL	33	13	25	38	34	4	2	2	4	2
AHL totals			82	6	9	15	16	4	0	1	1	4

=== International ===
Year	Team	Event	GP	G	A	Pts	PIM
2004	Israel	WC-D2	2	0	0	0	0
2005	Israel	WC-D2	5	10	4	14	6
2006	Israel	WC-D1	5	1	2	3	6
2013	Israel	WC-D2	5	8	10	18	4
2014	Israel	WC-D2	5	3	5	8	0
Senior totals			27	22	21	43	16

== Personal life ==
Eizenman was married to Jacqueline Frisch on June 26, 2016.

== Awards and honours ==
Award	Year
All-ECAC Hockey Rookie Team	2003–04

== See also ==
- List of select Jewish ice hockey players
