= Nikšić =

City in Montenegro

Nikšić Никшић
- Town and municipality
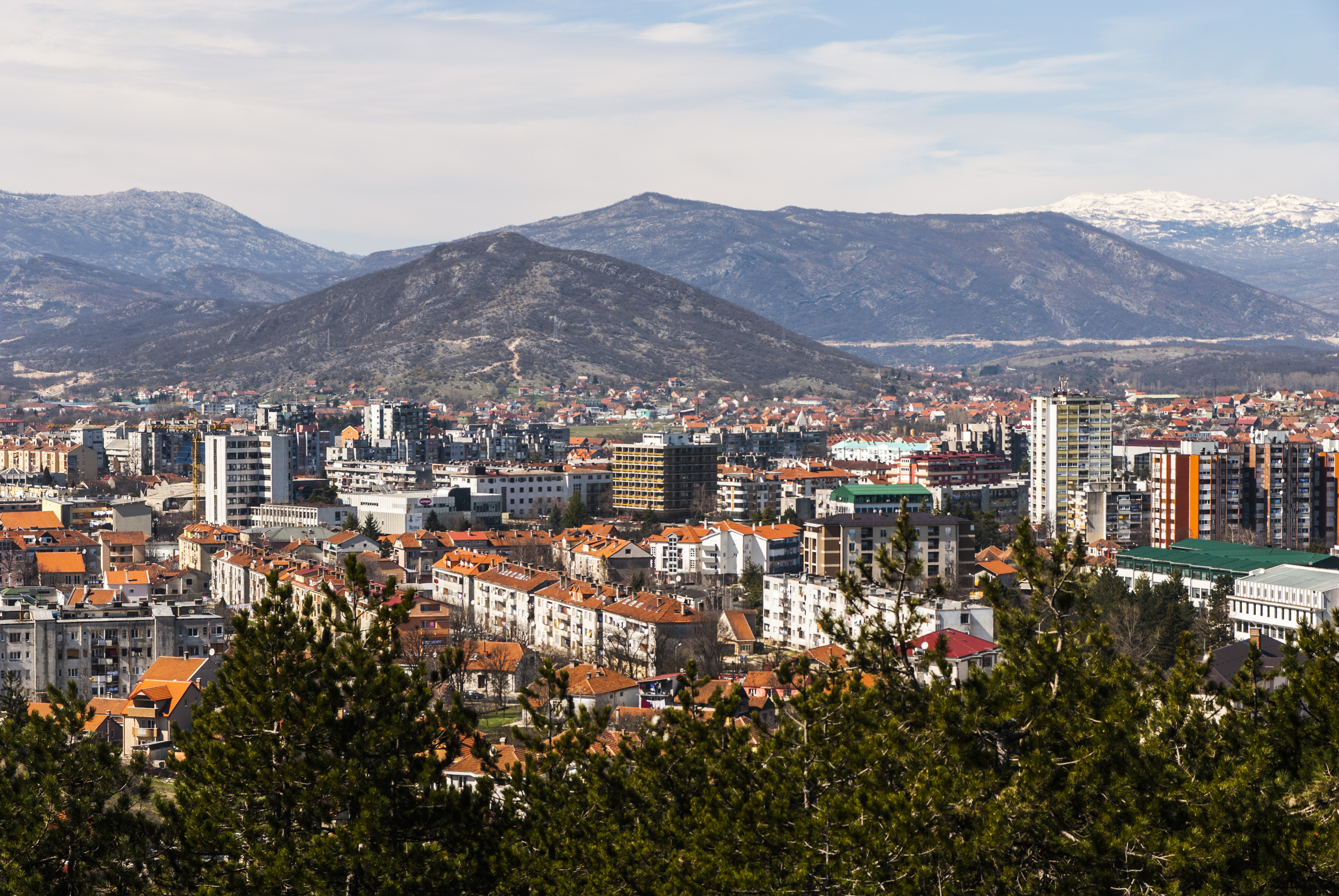
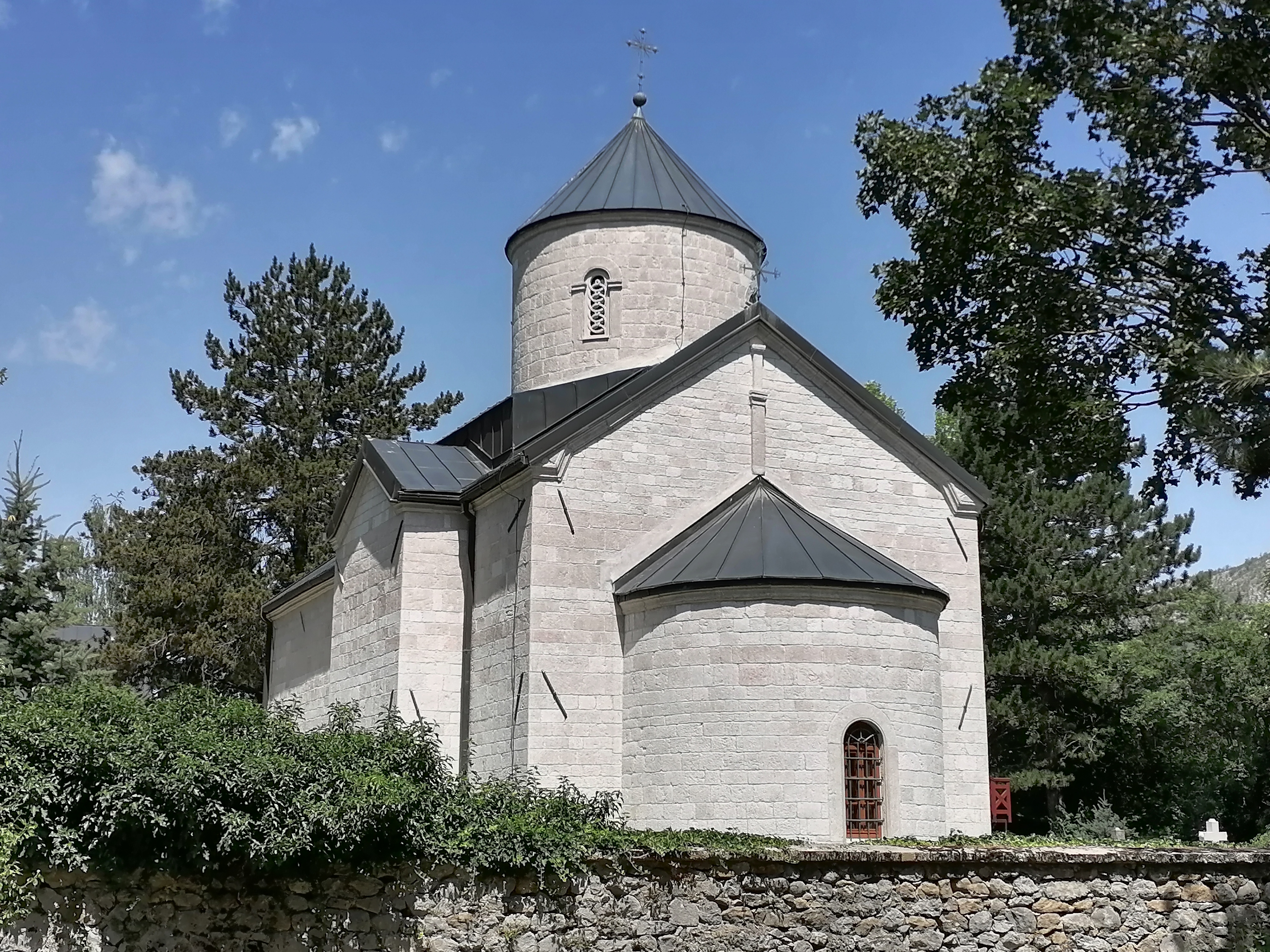
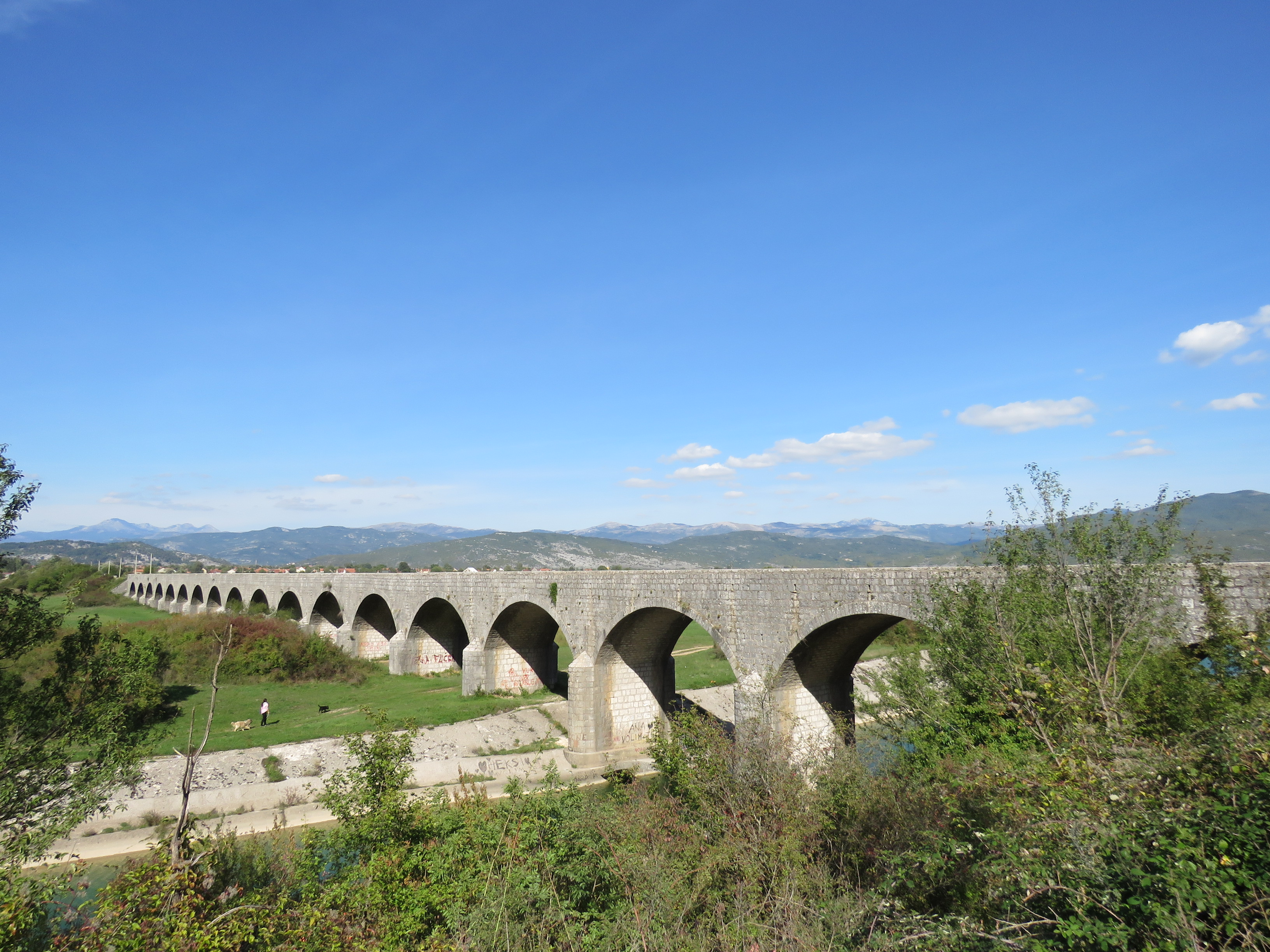
- From top: View of the city, Monastery of Župa, Tsar's Bridge

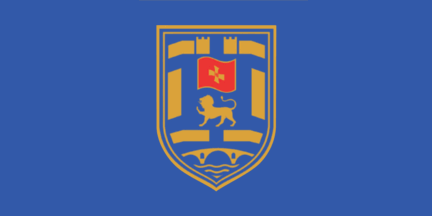
- Flag Coat of arms

- Location within Montenegro Nikšić (Europe)
- Coordinates: 42°46′40″N 18°57′00″E
- Country: Montenegro
- Municipality: Nikšić
- Founded: 4th century (as Anderba), 5th century (as Anagastum)
- Settlements: 110

Government
  - Type: Mayor-Assembly
  - Mayor: Marko Kovačević (NSD)

Area
  - Town and municipality: 2,065 km^{2} (797 sq mi)

Population (2023)
  - Rank: 2nd in Montenegro
  - Density: 37/km^{2} (96/sq mi)
  - Urban: 32,046
  - Municipality: 65,705 ▼ (2,023 preliminary)
- Time zone: UTC+1 (CET)
  - Summer (DST): UTC+2 (CEST)
- Postal code: 81400
- Area code: +382 40
- Car plates: NK
- ISO 3166-2 code: ME-12
- Website: niksic.me

Nikšić (Montenegrin Cyrillic: Никшић, pronounced [nîkʃit͡ɕ]) is Montenegro's second-largest city, with an urban population of 66,700 as of the 2023 census. It lies in the western region of the country, at the heart of the expansive Nikšić field, nestled at the base of Trebjesa Hill.

Nikšić serves as the administrative center of the Nikšić Municipality, which encompasses a population of 65,705 and spans the largest area among all Montenegrin municipalities. By territory, it was also the largest municipality in the former Yugoslavia. The city plays a key role as a hub for industry, education, and culture in the country.

== Name ==
In classical antiquity, the area of Nikšić was the site of the settlement of the Illyrian tribe of the Endirudini and was known in sources of the time as Anderba or Enderon. The Roman Empire built a military camp (castrum Anderba) in the 4th century AD, which was known as the Ostrogothic fortress Anagastum (after 459 AD). After Slavic settlement in the region, Anagastum became Slavic Onogošt, which was the name of the town and župa (county) in the Middle Ages. Onogošt was renamed as Nikšić in the middle of 15th century after the Nikšići, a Montenegrin tribe.

== History ==
Historical affiliations

- Illyria (9th century BCE – 33 BCE)
- Roman Republic (33 BCE – 27 BCE)
- Roman Empire (27 BCE – 476)
- Byzantine Empire (476 – 997)
- First Bulgarian Empire (997 – 1018)
- Byzantine Empire (1018 – 1040)
- Dioclea (1040 – 1186)
- Grand Principality of Serbia (1186 – 1217)
- Kingdom of Serbia (1217 – 1346)
- Serbian Empire (1346 – 1371)
- Vojinović Domain (1371 – 1373)
- Banate of Bosnia (1373 – 1377)
- Kingdom of Bosnia (1377 – 1463)
- Ottoman Empire (1463 – 1877)
- Principality of Montenegro (1877 – 1910)
- Kingdom of Montenegro (1910 – 1916)
- Austria-Hungary (1916 – 1918)
- Kingdom of Yugoslavia (1918 – 1941)
- Kingdom of Italy (1941 – 1943)
- Greater German Reich (1943 – 1944)
- SFR Yugoslavia (SR Montenegro) (1944 – 1992)
- FR Yugoslavia ( Republic of Montenegro) (1992 – 2006)
- Montenegro (2006 – present)

=== Antiquity ===
The region formed one of the core areas of the Illyrian kingdom with its capital in Rhizon. It was inhabited by the Endirudini, who figure in the list of tribes which surrendered to Octavian in 33 BC. The Endirudini were one of the tribes who were included in the administrative reorganization of the tribal units in the early Roman Empire and became part of the Docleatae with Doclea as their administrative center.

=== Middle Ages ===
Anagastum

During the Early Middle Ages, it was located within the South Slavic (Sklavenoi) tribal provinces of Travunia or Duklja (which were under the authority of the Serbian Principality of the Vlastimirović dynasty). With the fall of the Vlastimirovići and the hinterland regions in the second half of the 10th century, Doclea was resurrected with Stefan Vojislav and his Vojislavljević dynasty, succeeded by Stefan Nemanja and his Nemanjić dynasty, at which time the Onogošt župa existed. With the fall of the Serbian Empire, Onogošt came under the rule of Kingdom of Bosnia in 1373, and was under the rule of the Kosača noble family, which held territory in Herzegovina from 1448 until Herzegovina fell to the Ottomans.

=== Ottoman Empire ===
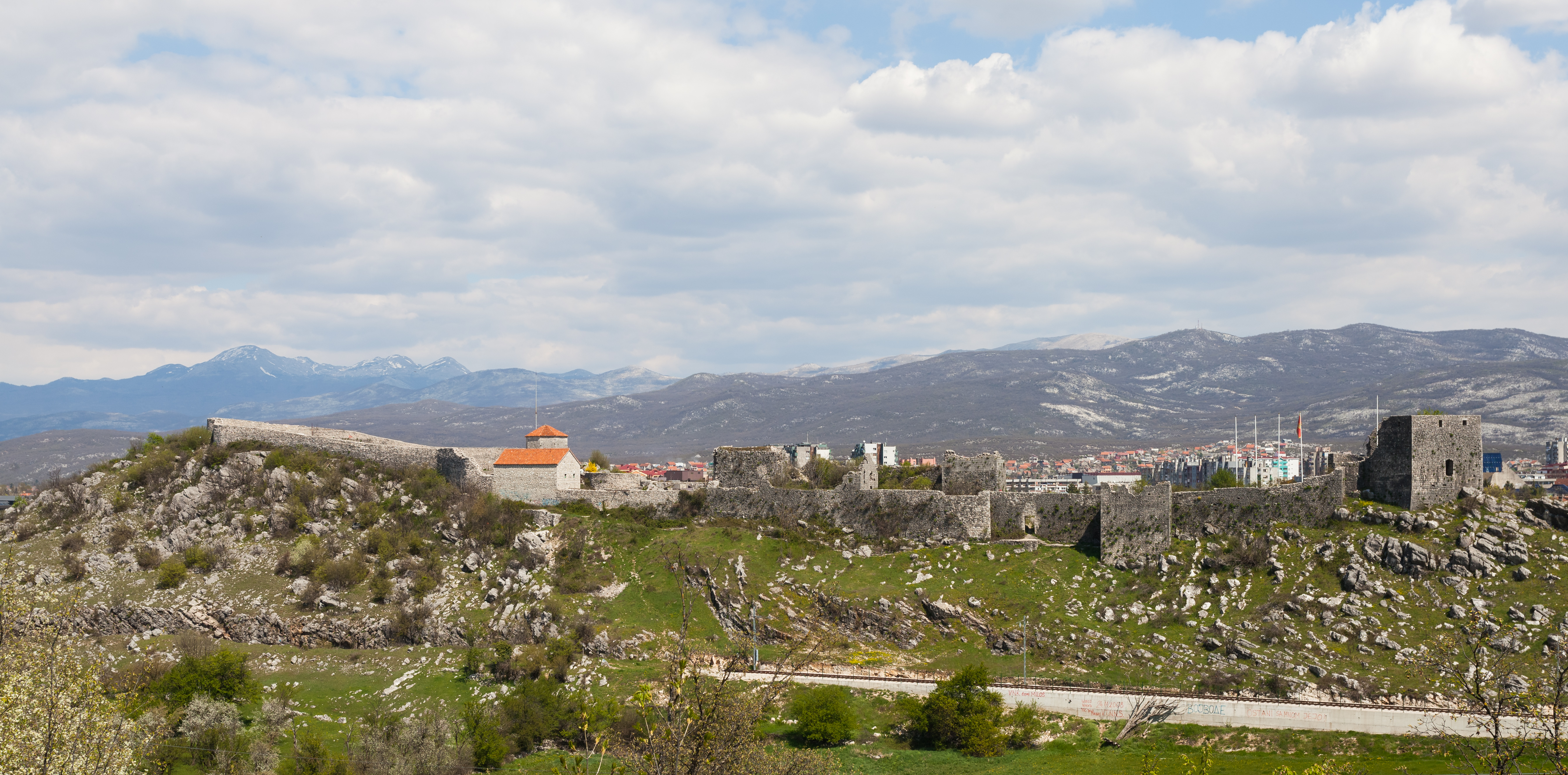
Bedem castle ruins

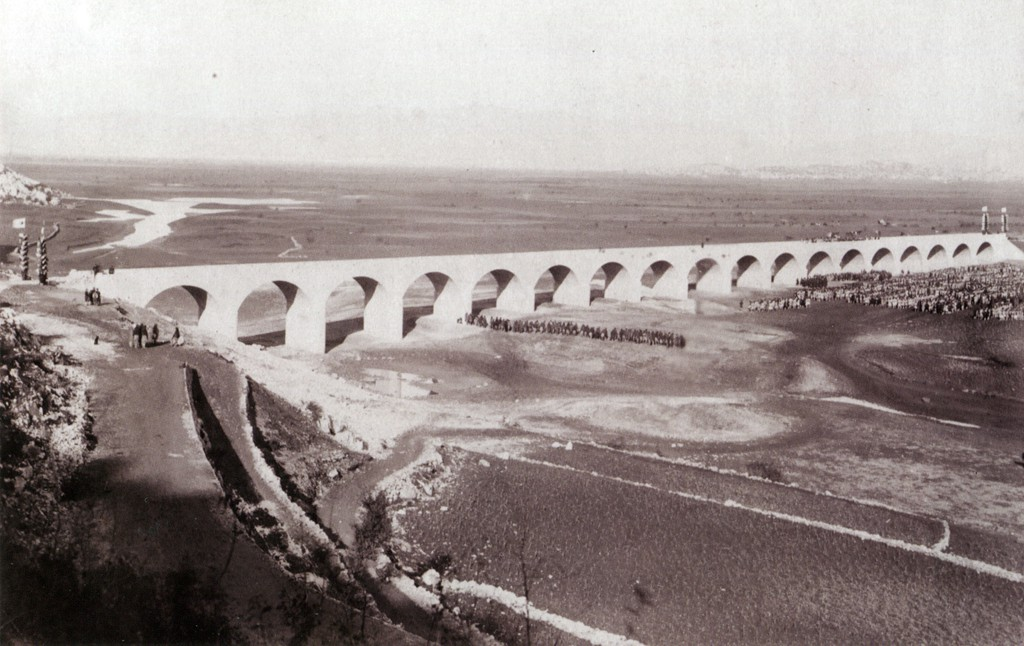
Carev Most was designed by Nikšić's city planner Josip Slade and completed in 1894.

The Ottoman Empire took control of Onogošt in 1465, and it stayed under control of the Turks for more than four hundred years, as a part of Herzegovina Province. Onogošt was first referred to as "Nikšić" in a document titled Radonia Pribisalich de Nichsich printed in 1518. Evliya Çelebi mentioned Serbs who live in the villages around Nikšić. The name "Nikšić" was used alongside Onogošt until 1767, when the name Nikšić was officially implemented after an ayan council, a high-profile meeting of Ottoman feudal lords which was relatively common at the time. During the later years of Ottoman occupation, the town served as a significant fortified military stronghold. During the course of Ottoman rule, a total of four mosques were built in Nikšić. The first one, Donjogradska, was constructed between 1695 and 1703. A second mosque called Hadžidanuša was constructed sometime in the early 1700s by an Ottoman military captain, Hadži-Husejin Danević; it was colloquially known as the "short mosque" because it had no minarets. A third mosque, known simply as "Pasha's mosque", was the largest in Nikšić. It was said to be architecturally similar to Jashar Pasha Mosque in Pristina. A fourth mosque called Hadži-Ismail's mosque was erected in 1807, and was the only mosque to survive the departure of the Ottoman Empire from Nikšić later that century.

Under the influence of the First Serbian Uprising, in the summer of 1805, the movement of Herzegovinian Serbs wanting to start an uprising appeared in Nikšić. The people of Nikšić relied on and cooperated with the harambašas from Popovo Polje, Trebinje and Trebinje Šuma, (Serbo-Croatian: Требињска шума), (Note: Trebinje Šuma is the forested area between Trebinje and Poljica Popovo, along the river Trebišnjica) and calculated that 19,000 Serbs could rise up in revolt, while weapons were to arrive from Russia, via Greece. The Turks reacted to that by sending 10,000 soldiers led by pasha Kauzlarić to quell the rebellion. After the suppression of the uprising by the Turks, in which local Slavic Muslims probably took part, there was no more mention of the wider rebellion in historical sources.

In 1807, armed forces led by Petar I Petrović-Njegoš along with 1,000 Russian troops attempted to take Nikšić, but Ottoman forces prevailed. On 18 July 1876 the Principality of Montenegro defeated Ottoman forces in the Battle of Vučji Do in the western edge of the municipality of Nikšić. On 27 August 1877, the rest of Nikšić was taken by the Montenegrin Army under the command of Vojvoda Mašo Vrbica after a 47-day siege against the Ottoman authorities. English archaeologist Arthur Evans witnessed the negotiations between Nicholas I of Montenegro (Nikola I) and the remaining Bosniaks (Muslims) after the siege, and subsequently wrote about them in his diary:

"Prince Nikola upon entering Nikšić directly invited representatives of Muslim citizens and informed them that whoever decides to stay is guaranteed complete personal freedom, freedom to retain homes, land, and all property, complete freedom of religion and that they will enjoy all the rights of Montenegrin citizenry, even including the right to carry arms. On the other hand, those who decide to leave will be allowed to bring any mobile goods and the Montenegrin government will issue a horse and an envoy up to the border."

=== Principality and Kingdom of Montenegro (1877–1918) ===
Nikšić was officially recognized as a part of the Principality of Montenegro in the Treaty of Berlin. The small Ottoman hamlet began to transform into a modern urban settlement. The first urban plan was adopted in 1883, commissioned by King Nikola, who appointed Croatian architect Josip Slade to develop the city planning. In addition to designing contemporary Nikšić, he also designed the monumental Carev Most nearby.

=== Kingdom of Yugoslavia (1918–1941) ===
The ousting of King Nikola and the context of the transition to the Kingdom of Serbs, Croats, and Slovenes resulted in considerable tension and even violence in Nikšić. On 23 December 1918 Nikšić was the site of a skirmish between Montenegrin Greens and Serbian troops under the command of Dragan Milutinović. The Greens had launched an attack on Nikšić during the Christmas Uprising, although Serbian forces prevailed. Even after the Christmas Uprising ended, some Montenegrin Greens continued resisting the Yugoslav government for many years. On 28 December 1923, 11 Montenegrin "Komiti" who continued guerilla activities after the Christmas Uprising were executed in Nikšić by the Serbian Gendarmery.

Nikšić saw the establishment of rail transport during the Kingdom of Yugoslavia. On 12 July 1938, after thirteen years of intermittent construction, the first train arrived from Bileća at the newly-constructed railway station in Nikšić. A gate was decorated in front of the new station, on which a portrait of King Petar II was installed with "Long Live Yugoslavia!" written under the portrait. Approximately 5,000 people waited for the first train to arrive, even when its arrival was delayed by two hours on a hot day. During the delay, much of the public was reportedly impatient, with two war veterans leading a kolo dance on the railroad tracks before the train arrived.

=== World War II ===
During World War II, Nikšić was first occupied by the Italian governorate in Montenegro. The occupation resulted in several insurrections, with one of the earliest started by the Yugoslav Partisans. The first Partisan advances were violently repressed, as Nikšić became the site of a large number of public executions, including those of notable communists Ljubo Čupić and 16-year old Joka Baletić.

Over the course of 7–8 April 1944, Nikšić was bombed by the Royal Air Force, using Vickers Wellington long-range bombers. One of the Yugoslav Partisans' commanders in Montenegro, Peko Dapčević, requested to Josip Broz Tito that allied forces bomb Nikšić in order to force out the Nazi occupation. The recorded number of casualties from the bombing raid vary depending on different sources, ranging from approximately 200 to 500 killed.

=== SFR Yugoslavia (1945–1991) ===
After the end of World War II, Nikšić became the site of unprecedented industrial and political developments. On 24 September 1948, six unmarked Supermarine Spitfire aircraft landed at Kapino Polje Airport, where they were retrofitted and delivered to the Israeli Air Force in a secret operation. During the operation, the airport was quarantined from the public by Yugoslavia's State Security Administration. The unmarked aircraft were flown by pilots from the Israeli Air Force, and three of them were used in the 1948 Arab–Israeli War less than a month later.

One of the biggest changes in Nikšić were the construction of new factories, particularly the metal processing plant "Boris Kidrič", which Josip Broz Tito first visited in May 1959. Tito visited the Boris Kidrič plant again on 12 May 1969, after it was reported that the plant recorded a positive net revenue for the previous quarter-year for the first time since its establishment. During his second visit to Nikšić, Tito insisted that negative business results be addressed by modernizing machinery in the factory, as opposed to placing responsibility solely on workers. By 1985, the Boris Kidrič metal works employed over 6,500 workers, although that year two strikes took place. Chronic inflation of the Yugoslav dinar had already begun, and the metal works were dependent on imports in order to produce. This added pressure to raise prices of steel products, which in turn made them less competitive with steel from western Europe.

The city population was increased tenfold, and Nikšić became the heart of Montenegrin industrial complex. During the socialist republic era, the city flourished, as steel and iron works, bauxite mines, electricity production, brewery and wood processing industries were set up in and around the city.

=== During the Yugoslav Wars ===
With the breakup of Yugoslavia, Nikšić was hit hard with the hyperinflation of the Yugoslav dinar, international sanctions, and overall decline throughout Yugoslavia during the 1990s. Nikšić had a large amount of reservists in the Yugoslav People's Army. Between 62 and 77 JNA soldiers killed in the Yugoslav Wars were from Nikšić alone. Political tension in Nikšić was polarized between Serbian nationalist and Montenegrin secessionist groups. Although Nikšić did not experience violence from the war in neighboring Bosnia, there were some extraordinary incidents. In the fall of 1992, Vojislav Šešelj planned to hold a Serbian Radical Party rally in Nikšić. However, a local criminal named Brano Mićunović plotted to assassinate Šešelj outside of a tunnel upon entering Nikšić, and Šešelj ultimately cancelled the meeting after hearing about the plot. In June 1993, Hadži-Ismail's mosque was destroyed during unrest.

Years of wartime tension and widespread poverty took a toll on the city. In 1996, Nikšić recorded the second-most suicides out of any city in Yugoslavia. After a period of twenty days during which six suicides and two murders took place, clergymen in Nikšić decided to start an annual public liturgy, or Litija, which was attended by tens of thousands of worshipers who walked all the way from Ostrog Monastery in May 1996.

== Local administration ==
=== City Assembly (2025–2027) ===
Party/Coalition	Seats	Local government
DPS	16 / 41	Opposition
ZBCG (NSD–DNP)	10 / 41	Government
PES	5 / 41	Government
DCG	3 / 41	Government
SNP	3 / 41	Government
SD	2 / 41	Opposition
UCG	1 / 41	Government
SCG	1 / 41	Government

=== Mayor ===
Mayor of Nikšić is the head of the town and municipality of Nikšić. He acts on behalf of the town, and performs an executive function in the municipality of Nikšić. Current mayor is Marko Kovačević, member of the right-wing Democratic Front.

List of Mayors since introduction of multi-party system (1990–present):

- Milorad Drljević (DPS) (1990–2002)
- Vera Miljanić (LSCG) (2002–2003)
- Labud Šljukić (LSCG) (2003–2005)
- Nebojša Radojičić (DPS) (2005–2013)
- Veselin Grbović (DPS) (2013–2020)
- Milutin Simović (DPS) (2020–2021)
- Marko Kovačević (DF) (2021–present)

== Geography ==
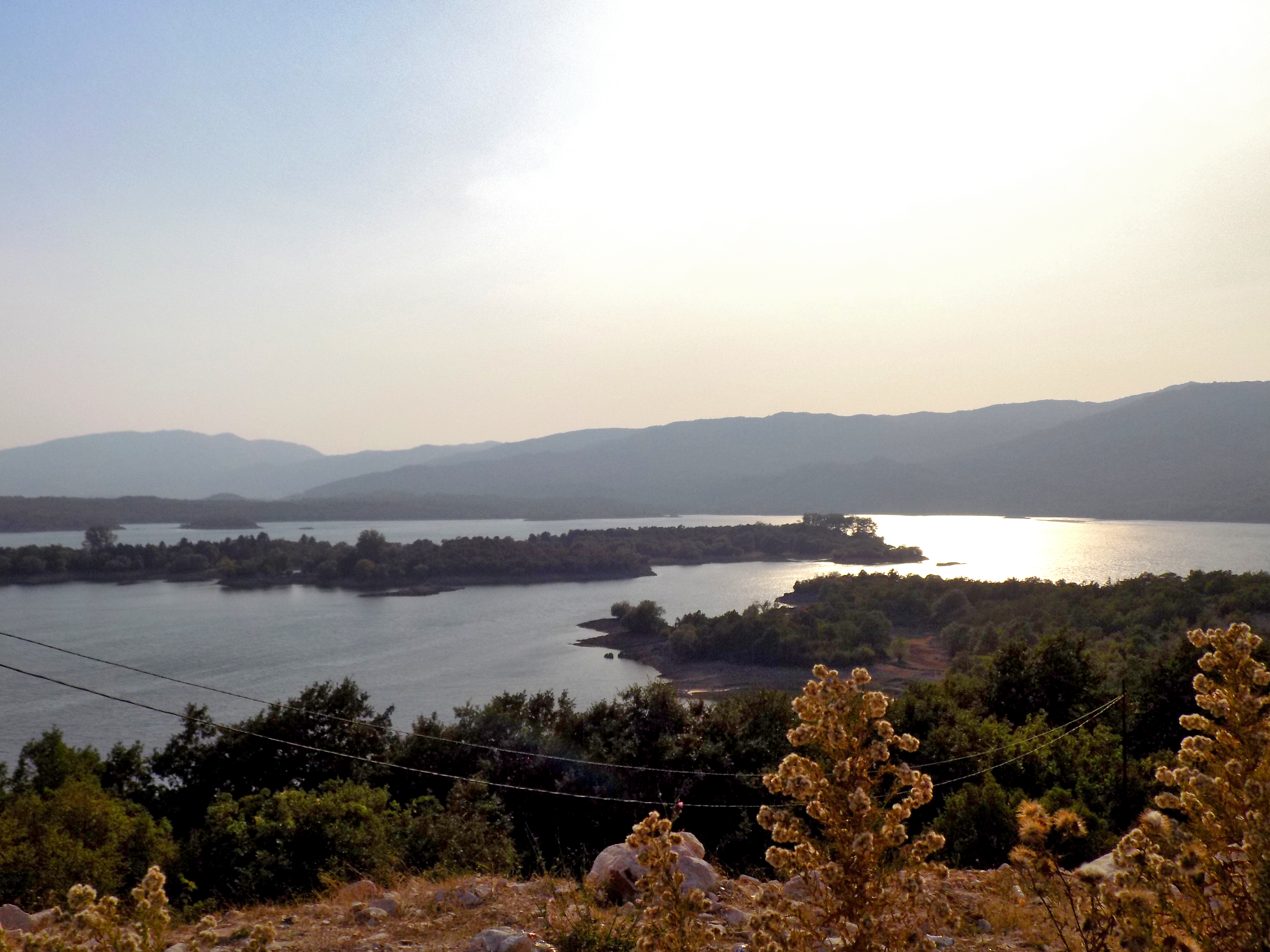
Krupac Lake near Nikšić

Nikšić is situated in north-central Montenegro. It is located at the centre of the spacious Nikšić field (Nikšićko polje), a karst plain with an area of 48 km^{2}, and an elevation of 640 m AMSL. The plain is surrounded by inhospitable rocky mountainous terrain, a typical landscape of western Montenegro. The city itself is located at the foot of the Trebjesa hill.

Zeta river originates in the Nikšić field, and flows near the city of Nikšić, before it becomes a subterranean river south of the city. The river caused frequent flooding of the plain, until the construction of Hydroelectric power plant Perućica in 1960. The construction of the power plant resulted in creation of three large artificial lakes near the city - Krupac Lake, Slano Lake and Vrtac Lake. Today, the lakes are a popular recreation and relaxation retreats for the citizens of Nikšić.

=== Climate ===
Under the Köppen climate classification, Nikšić has an oceanic climate (Cfb), which is influenced by the Mediterranean climate drying trend during summer. The average temperature in January is 1.7 °C (35.1 °F), while in July it is 20.4 °C (68.7 °F). Average humidity amounts to 69%. Nikšić receives 2,238 hours of sunshine per year, with warm and moderately wet summers, and cool and rainy winters. On average, there are 19 days per year with snowfall.

Climate data for Nikšić (1991–2020, extremes 1949–present)
Month	Jan	Feb	Mar	Apr	May	Jun	Jul	Aug	Sep	Oct	Nov	Dec	Year
Record high °C (°F)	17.7 (63.9)	21.2 (70.2)	23.5 (74.3)	27.7 (81.9)	30.6 (87.1)	34.9 (94.8)	39.4 (102.9)	40.8 (105.4)	36.6 (97.9)	29.4 (84.9)	27.6 (81.7)	18.4 (65.1)	40.8 (105.4)
Mean daily maximum °C (°F)	6.5 (43.7)	7.3 (45.1)	10.8 (51.4)	15.0 (59.0)	20.1 (68.2)	24.9 (76.8)	28.3 (82.9)	28.9 (84.0)	22.9 (73.2)	17.7 (63.9)	12.3 (54.1)	7.7 (45.9)	16.9 (62.4)
Mean daily minimum °C (°F)	−1.5 (29.3)	−0.9 (30.4)	1.8 (35.2)	5.4 (41.7)	9.4 (48.9)	13.1 (55.6)	15.3 (59.5)	15.4 (59.7)	11.3 (52.3)	7.3 (45.1)	3.4 (38.1)	−0.2 (31.6)	6.7 (44.0)
Record low °C (°F)	−20.2 (−4.4)	−17 (1)	−11.6 (11.1)	−5.4 (22.3)	−1.4 (29.5)	0.4 (32.7)	5.0 (41.0)	5.4 (41.7)	0.6 (33.1)	−4.0 (24.8)	−9.3 (15.3)	−15.6 (3.9)	−20.2 (−4.4)
Average precipitation mm (inches)	208.4 (8.20)	194.4 (7.65)	185.6 (7.31)	170.3 (6.70)	108.2 (4.26)	92.7 (3.65)	61.0 (2.40)	90.2 (3.55)	138.1 (5.44)	201.7 (7.94)	300.6 (11.83)	239.1 (9.41)	1,990.3 (78.34)
Average precipitation days (≥ 0.1 mm)	13	12	12	13	12	12	8	8	8	10	13	13	134
Average relative humidity (%)	72	70	67	67	67	67	57	59	66	71	75	74	68
Mean monthly sunshine hours	112.9	116.8	151.1	169.0	213.2	238.4	312.2	284.6	226.5	187.9	117.2	107.9	2,237.7
Source 1: Hydrological and Meteorological Service of Montenegro
Source 2: National Oceanic and Atmospheric Administration

== Cityscape ==
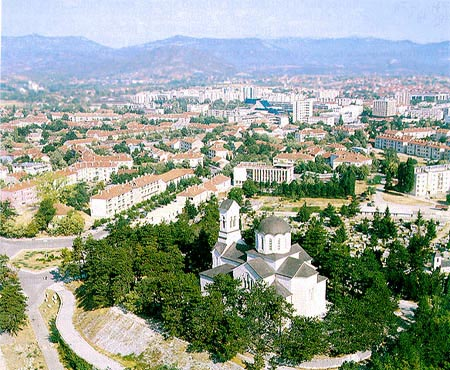
An older picture of Nikšić

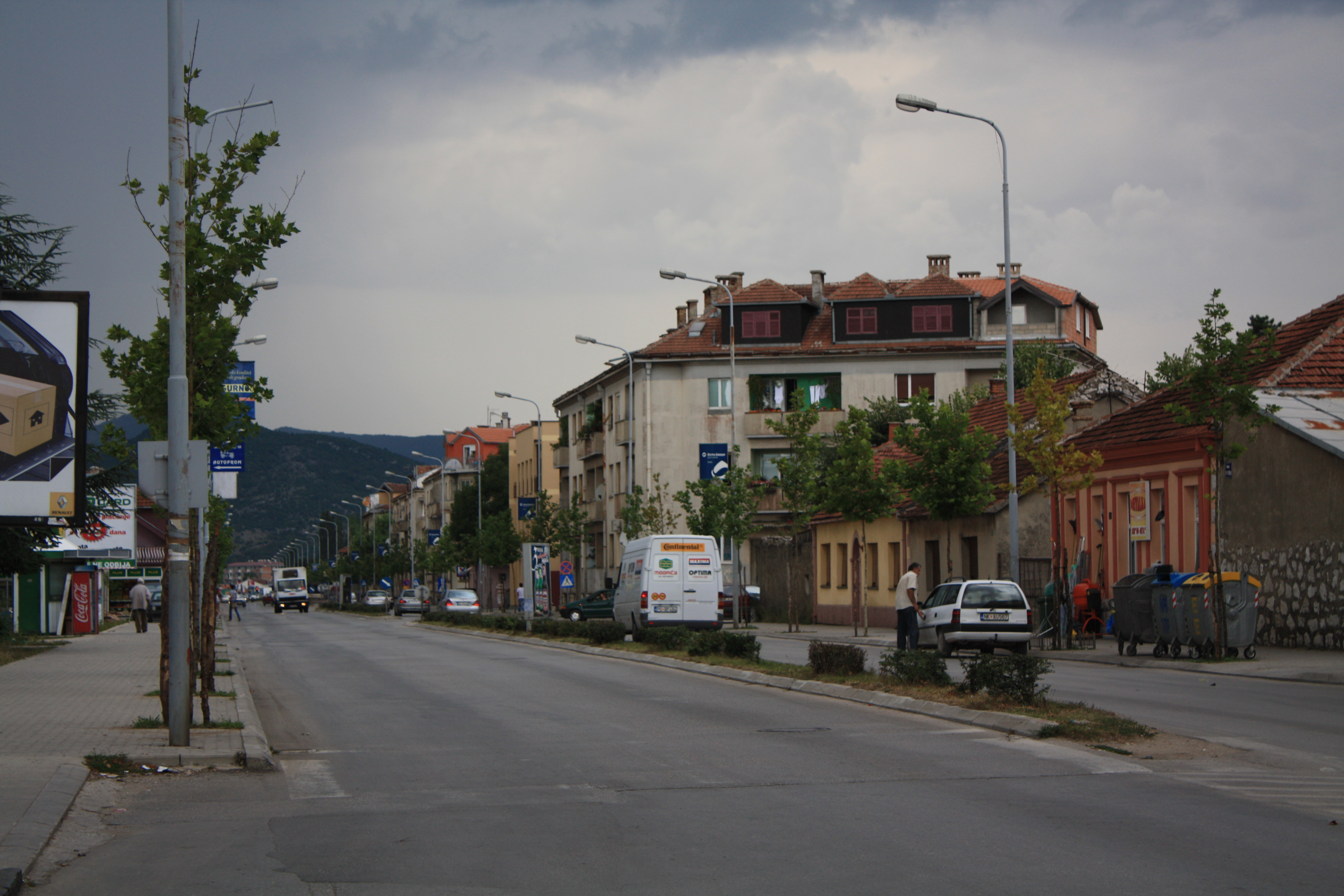
Vuka Mićunovića in Nikšić

Although Nikšić area has seen human settlements since antiquity, most of the modern Nikšić is a planned city. Very little remains of the Ottoman architectural heritage, despite the long presence of Ottoman Empire in the area. The city layout visible today still follows the 1883 urban plan commissioned by King Nicholas and designed by Croatian architect Josip Slade.

According to this plan, the streets of Nikšić radiate to the north and east from the central city square (today a roundabout), locally known as Skver. The radial streets are intersected by circumferential streets and avenues, thus creating a half-spider web-like street layout.

Layers of different architectural styles and urban patterns are evident along the radial network of streets. Thus, closest to the central roundabout is the historical core of Nikšić, formed after the liberation from Ottoman Empire, and serving as a nucleus for Slade's urban plan. This area, on the foot of Trebjesa Hill, is home to King Nicholas Palace, City Park, and Freedom Square, main city square located along the central Njegoševa Street. The area is composed of mostly single or two storey row housing with basic designs, an architecture typical for late 19th and early 20th centuries Montenegro. The roundabout and the surrounding area is still the focal point of activities in the city, as bus and train stations, as well as commercial and civic services are located in the area.

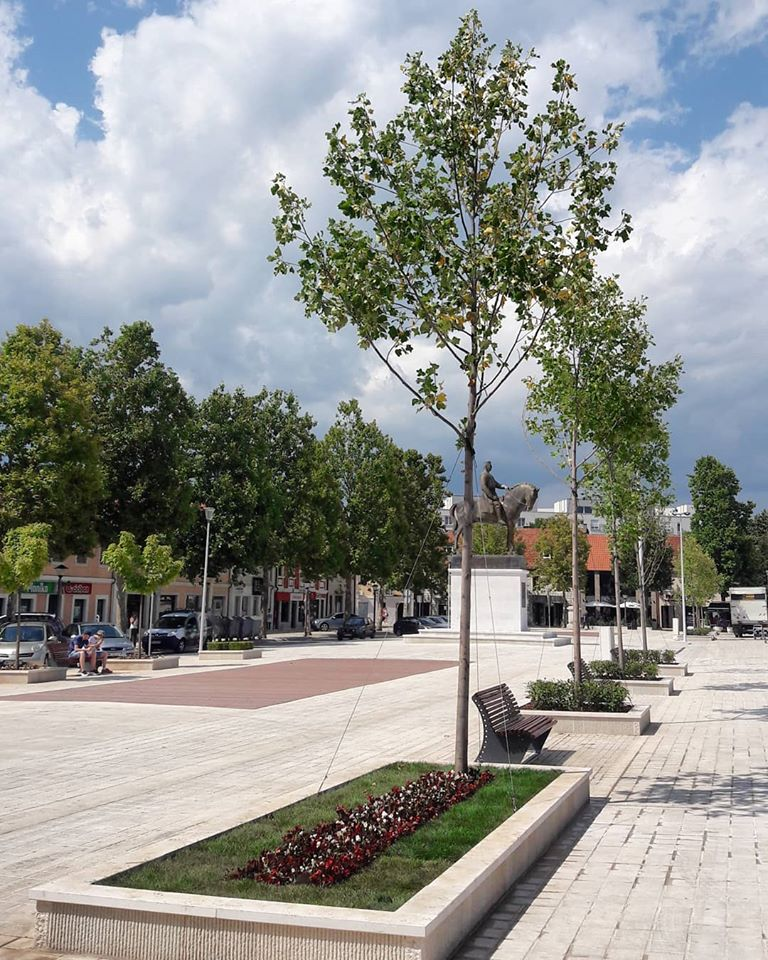
Freedom Square in Nikšić on the eve of the Statehood Day 2018 as seen from the south

Farther from the central roundabout, the historical core is encircled with a layer of mass residential blocks, built during the SFRY era. The building of the highrise residential blocks facilitated housing of the large population drawn to the city by rapid post-World War II industrialisation. The SFRY era apartment blocks are still home for the majority of residents of Nikšić.

Beyond the blocks, the city expanded in form of a suburban sprawl, that consists of detached housing. Close to the city blocks and major industrial areas, the lowrise single home suburbs are built with well executed urban plans, but farther away from the center, the city expanded in a chaotic and informal way. In addition, the rural areas south of Nikšić have merged with the city, so low density suburbs extend from the city in every direction, covering much of the Nikšić Field.

== Culture ==
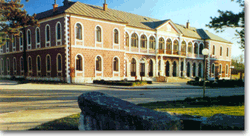
King Nikola's Palace

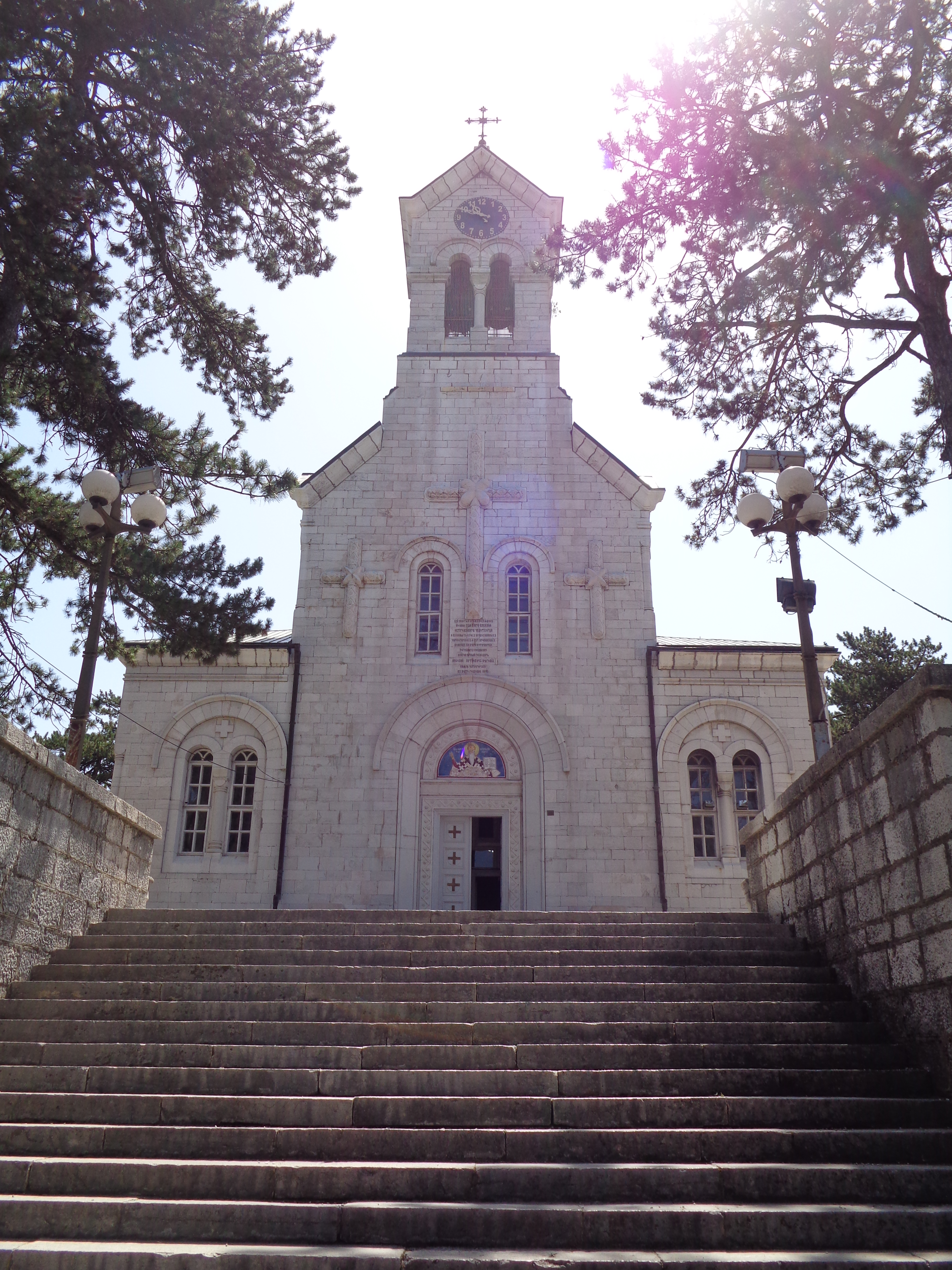
Church of St. Basil of Ostrog in Nikšić

Although mostly perceived as an industrial center, Nikšić is also a city of rich cultural heritage. The most significant cultural institution in the city is Centar Za Kulturu (Cultural Center), which incorporates the city's major public cultural establishments:

- Zavičajni Muzej (County Museum), situated in the former royal Palace of King Nikola, documents the historical development of the city.
- Nikšić art gallery
- Public library and Public archive
- Nikšić theater
- Zahumlje folk music society
- Stari Grad Anderva art society

The most significant cultural event in the city is Septembarski Dani Kulture (September days of Culture), that is one of the most recognizable cultural happenings in Montenegro. Other annual artistic events include Pjesnik na korzu (Poet on the promenade), Međunarodni festival glumca (International actors festival), Međunarodni festival kamerne muzike (International festival of chamber music), Međunarodni festival gitare (International guitar festival). Lake Fest rock festival, held annually at Krupac lake and Bedem Fest rock festival, held at Bedem Castle are gaining ground as one of the most recognizable music festivals in the former Yugoslav region.

Nikšić is known for its distinctive cultural atmosphere and bohemian art scene, with poet Vitomir Nikolić and singers/songwriters like Miladin Šobić or Marinko Pavićević as prominent representatives of the Nikšić bohemian spirit. Živko Nikolić, a native of Nikšić, is considered the most significant Montenegrin movie director.

Media scene of Nikšić is mostly confined to public broadcasters TV Nikšić and Radio Nikšić, and a number of commercial radio stations. Riječ and Luča magazines, published by the Faculty of Philology and the Faculty of Philosophy respectively, as well as Poznanstva children magazine, are also a part of Nikšić cultural scene.

=== Education ===
Nikšić is home to 40 educational institutions. Among those are 11 nurseries, 25 elementary schools of which one is elementary music school and 4 high schools, including the Stojan Cerović Gymnasium.

Nikšić is also home to three faculties of the University of Montenegro:

- Faculty of Philosophy - a complex educational and scientific institution which organizes undergraduate, specialist and postgraduate studies as well as doctoral studies within its main activities. Two institutes operate within the faculty:
  - Institute of philosophy and sociology and
  - Institute of geography
- Faculty of Philology
  - Institute of language and literature
- Faculty of sports and physical education

== Sports ==
Nikšić is regarded as one of the centers of Montenegrin sport. The combat sports are particularly popular in Nikšić, with a strong tradition in judo, karate and boxing. Nikšić judokas have been exceptionally successful at international competitions.

Sutjeska football club is the pillar of the city soccer tradition. The club has risen to the Yugoslav First League during the SFRY era, and is one of the most successful clubs since the Montenegrin First League was established in 2006. City Stadium is the club's home field. FK Čelik is also becoming more prominent as it has reached the UEFA Europa League qualifying phase.

In basketball, not only has Nikšić produced great players (Bojan Dubljević or Ana Poček for example), but the local team KK Sutjeska Nikšić became champions of the Montenegrin Basketball Cup in 2013.

Other team sports, particularly handball and volleyball, are also popular in Nikšić.

Besides City Stadium, other significant sporting venue is the Nikšić Sports Center. This facility features a 3,000 seat indoor sports hall, olympic-size swimming pool, 6-lane bowling alley, sports shooting range, tennis and futsal courts, and various other facilities.

Vučje ski resort is 18 km away from the city center, making winter sports a popular recreation among the citizens of Nikšić.

== Demographics ==
Population (city)

Census	Population
1948	9,485
1953	14,804
1961	26,569
1971	40,107
1981	50,399
1991	55,718
2003	58,212
2011	56,970
2023	32,046

Nikšić is administrative centre of Nikšić Municipality, which incorporates a densely populated fertile plain called "Župa", and has a population of 65,705 (2023. census).

Nikšić Municipality can be viewed as a metropolitan area of the city of Nikšić.

=== Settlements ===
There are 129 settlements in the municipality of Nikšić with a total population of 65,705 (2023).

=== Ethnicity ===
Source: Statistical Office of Montenegro - MONSTAT, Census 2011

Ethnicity	Number	Percentage
Montenegrins	19,849	61.96%
Serbs	9353	29.19%
Other	1676	5.2%
not declared	1168	3.65%
Total	32,046	100%

=== Religion ===
Source: Statistical Office of Montenegro - MONSTAT, Census 2011

Religion	Number	Percentage
Eastern Orthodoxy	51,539	90.46%
Islam	1707	2.99%
Atheism	689	1.2%
Catholicism	201	0.35%
Other	619	1.08%
not declared	1987	3.48%
Total	56,970	100%

== Economy ==
Nikšić is, alongside Podgorica, one of the biggest industrial centres of Montenegro. A steel mill (Nikšićka Željezara), bauxite mine, the Trebjesa brewery (Nikšićka Pivara), and many more are concentrated in this city.

These big industries had struggled to survive the collapse of the socialist economy, but have since recovered. The process of privatization is either finished or still in progress for some of these industries.

Today those industry giants cannot employ as many workers as they could back in the days of Socialist Federal Republic of Yugoslavia, and the economy of Nikšić is slowly transforming into one that is more service-oriented. In 1981 Niksic's GDP per capita was 91% of the Yugoslav average.

== Transport ==
=== Road ===
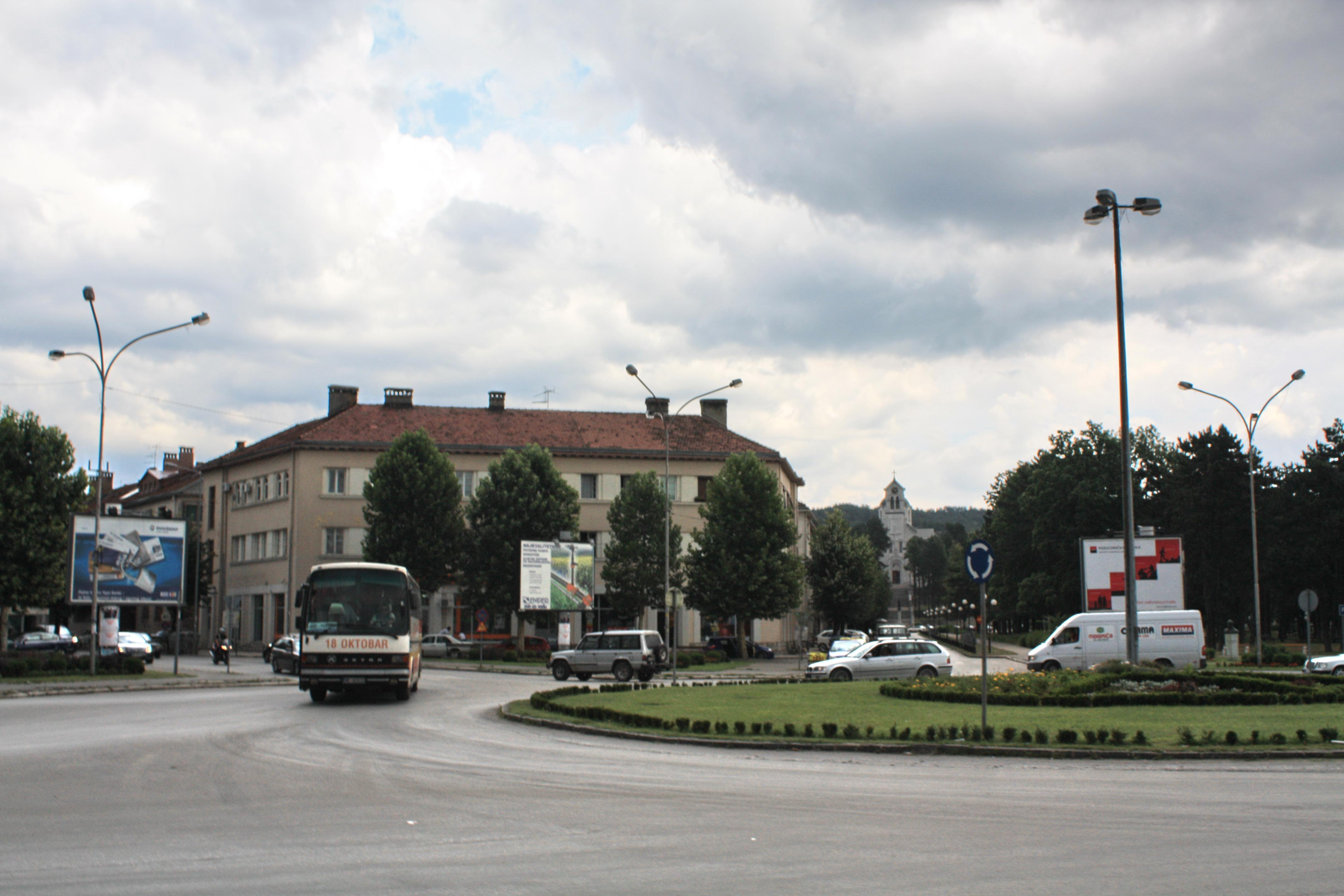
Traffic roundabout

Nikšić's main road connection is E762 highway, which connects Nikšić with Podgorica to the southeast, and with Plužine and on to the Foča and Sarajevo (Bosnia and Hercegovina) to the northwest. Another recently reconstructed north/south Montenegrin road corridor passes through Nikšić, the Risan/Trebinje-Nikšić-Šavnik-Žabljak road. This road is the shortest connection Nikšić has with Bay of Kotor and Montenegrin coast. Nikšić also has the distinction of being one of the first Montenegrin towns to have a bypass road. The bypass, built during the SFRY era, has been upgraded in 2011, and now services every transit corridor of Nikšić, directing all transit traffic away from the urban core. Like many cities in the former Yugoslavia, Nikšić is the hub of multiple intercity bus companies, the largest of them being Glušica Nikšić and 4 Decembar Nikšić which operate to destinations as far as Sarajevo and Belgrade.

=== Rail ===
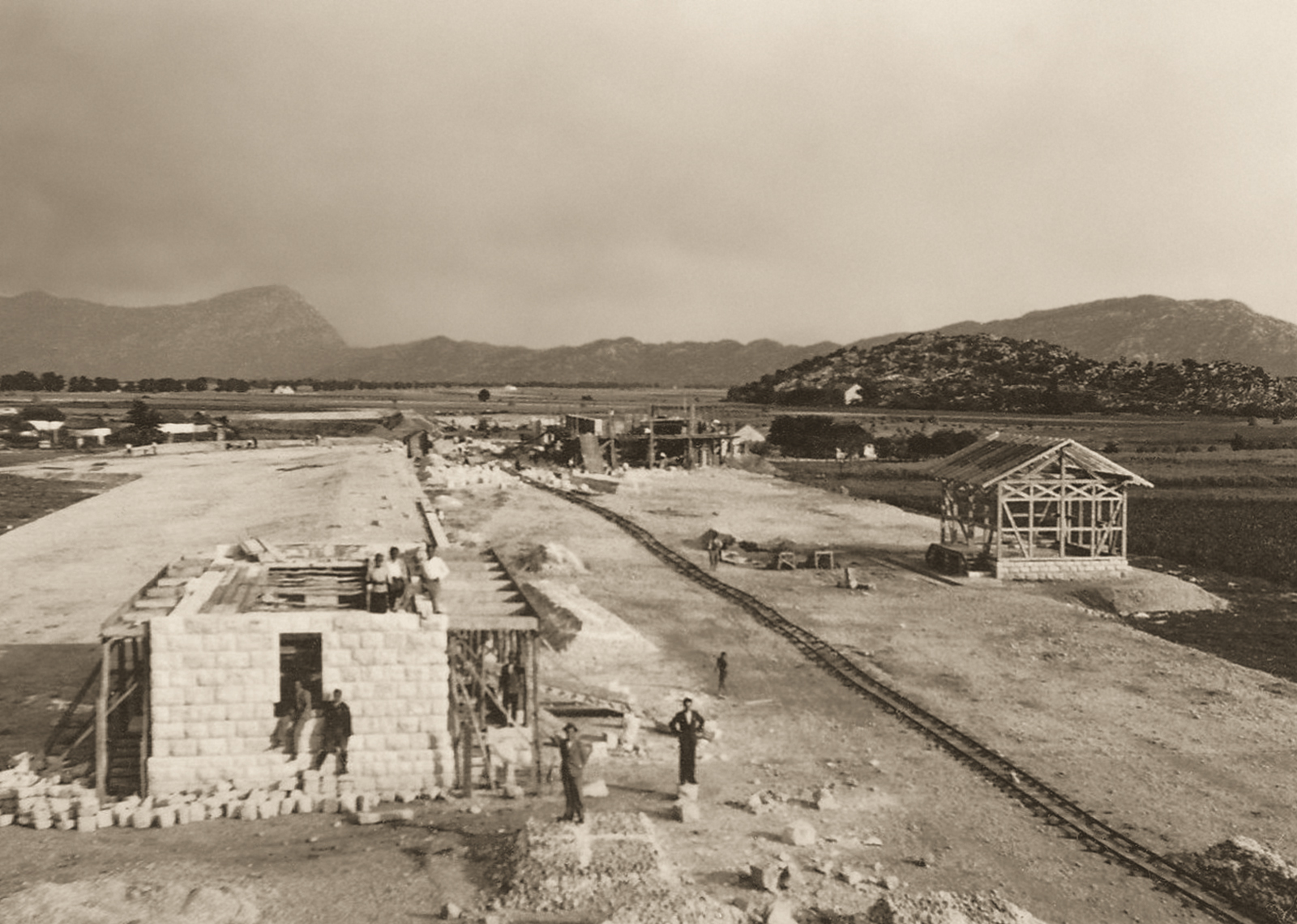
Construction of the train station in 1938

Nikšić is the terminus of Nikšić-Podgorica railway, which is sole rail connection of the city. This railway line connects with Belgrade-Bar and Podgorica–Shkodër lines in Podgorica.

This rail link has been used mainly to transport bauxite from Nikšić bauxite mine to Podgorica Aluminium Plant. It is currently under reconstruction and electrification, and passenger service will be reintroduced once the reconstruction is completed. Three CAF Civity EMUs have been ordered by Railways of Montenegro specifically to serve this railway, cutting the travel time between Nikšić and Podgorica to only 50 minutes. The first of the new trains will go into service on 1 June 2013.

Nikšić obtained its narrow-gauge (760 mm (2 ft 5 15/16 in)) railway connection with Bosnia and Herzegovina via Bileća and Trebinje when the railway line was extended from Bileća and opened in 1938. Not far from Trebinje, the narrow-gauge line used to branch off in three directions: towards Čapljina in Bosnia and Herzegovina, Zelenika in Bay of Kotor in Montenegro (a dead end), and Dubrovnik in Croatia (also a dead end). After reaching Čapljina, the line used to run to the south, to the Ploče harbour in Croatia, and to the north, to the rest of the world via Mostar and Sarajevo. The narrow-gauge extension from Nikšić to Titograd (Podgorica), built by youth work brigades, was opened in 1948. That extension was converted to standard gauge (1,435 mm (4 ft 8 1/2 in)) in 1965. The narrow-gauge line from Nikšić to Čapljina was closed down in 1976 and dismantled soon after.

=== Air ===
Nikšić Airport is located on the western outskirts of the city. It is a small sport airport, that caters to needs of general aviation, and of local enthusiast aviation club. After significant reconstruction and expansion, the airport was chosen to be a host of 2010 FAI World Parachuting Championships. Scheduled passenger service has yet to be introduced.

Podgorica Airport is some 60 km (37 mi) away from Nikšić, and has regular flights to Belgrade, Sarajevo, Budapest, Zürich, Frankfurt, Ljubljana, Paris, Rome and Vienna. Both Tivat and Dubrovnik airports are some 100 km (62 mi) away, and offer regular services to major European destinations.

== International cooperation ==
Nikšić is twinned with:

- Arilje, Serbia
- Bileća, Bosnia and Herzegovina
- Bovec, Slovenia
- Brindisi, Italy
- Chifeng, China
- Foča, Bosnia and Herzegovina
- Gacko, Bosnia and Herzegovina
- Girona, Spain
- Gradačac, Bosnia and Herzegovina
- Istočno Novo Sarajevo, Bosnia and Herzegovina
- Jajce, Bosnia and Herzegovina
- Koper, Slovenia
- Koprivnica, Croatia
- Kumanovo, North Macedonia
- Lazarevac, Serbia
- Murska Sobota, Slovenia
- Nevesinje, Bosnia and Herzegovina
- New Belgrade, Serbia
- Ohrid, North Macedonia
- Prilep, North Macedonia
- Rab, Croatia
- Ražanj, Serbia
- Strumica, North Macedonia
- Trebinje, Bosnia and Herzegovina
- Tuzla, Bosnia and Herzegovina
- Valjevo, Serbia
- Vrbas, Serbia
- Zadar, Croatia
- Želino, North Macedonia

== Notable individuals ==
- Dragomir Bečanović, judoka, World champion
- Boris Bojović, disputed metropolitan of the Montenegrin Orthodox Church
- Andrija Delibašić, footballer
- Bojan Dubljević, basketball player
- Milo Đukanović, President of Montenegro
- Grdan (fl. 1596–d. 1612), vojvoda of Nikšić and rebel leader
- Goran Jeretin, basketball player
- Zdravko Krivokapić, Prime Minister of Montenegro
- Radmila Miljanić-Petrović, handball player, Olympic silver medalist and European champion
- Milomir Miljanić, singer
- Andrija Milošević, actor
- David Mirković, basketball player
- Alen Muratović, handball player
- Vitomir Nikolić, poet
- Živko Nikolić, movie director
- Milosava Perunović (ca. 1900 - 1945), war heroine
- Vukan Perović, football player
- Željko Petrović, footballer
- Milisav Popović, fantasy author
- Nataša Popović, basketball player
- Silvija Popović, Serbian volleyball player, silver medalist at the 2016 Summer Olympics, World and European champion
- Zdravko Radulović, basketball player, silver medalist at the 1988 Summer Olympics and European champion
- Miladin Šobić, musician
- Željko Šturanović, former Prime Minister of Montenegro
- Mirko Vučinić, footballer
- Filip Vujanović, former President of Montenegro
- Miljan Zeković, football player
- Rajko Žižić, basketball player, three-time Olympic medalist and 1980 Olympic champion
- Milorad Žižić, boxer
- Vesna Zmijanac, singer
- Nina Žižić, singer
