= University of Montenegro Faculty of Law =

- Pravni fakultet Univerziteta Crne Gore
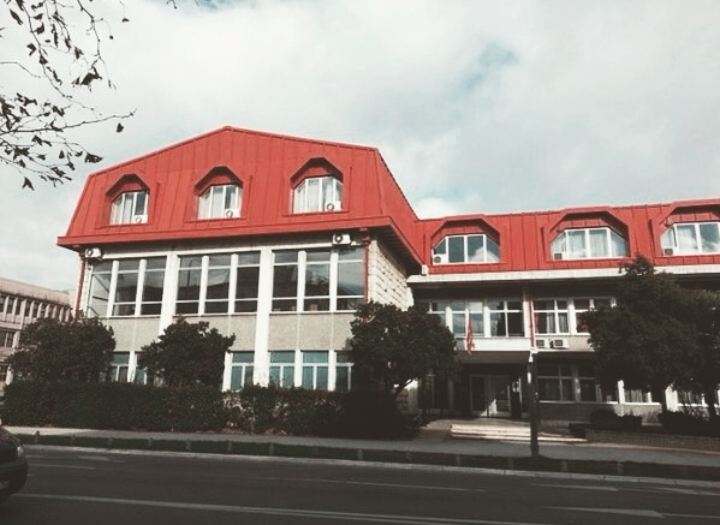
- Podgorica Law School
- Type: Public
- Established: 1972
- Affiliations: University of Montenegro
- Dean: Aneta Spaić
- Location: Podgorica, Montenegro; 42.446119°N 19.256479°E
- Campus: Urban
- Website: www.pravni.ucg.ac.me

The University of Montenegro Faculty of Law (Montenegrin: Pravin fakultet Univerziteta Crne Gore / Правни факултет Универзитета Црне Горе), also known as the Podgorica Law School, is one of the educational institutions of the University of Montenegro. The Faculty is Montenegro's leading law school.

== History ==
The Faculty of Law was established on October 27, 1972. It officially became part of the University of Montenegro on April 29, 1974, when the Agreement on Association into the University of Titograd (today's University of Montenegro) was signed with the representatives of the Faculty of Philosophy, the Faculty of Engineering, the Faculty of Economics, the Maritime Studies College from Kotor and three independent scientific institutes from Titograd. Its main building is located in Podgorica and is shared with the University's Faculty of Political Sciences. Affiliations in Bijelo Polje and Budva function within the Faculty. The Bijelo Polje law school was established in 2010. The Faculty of Law in Budva was opened the same year, at the Academy of Knowledge (Montenegrin: Akademija znanja / Академија знања).

== Organization ==
The faculty organizes undergraduate, postgraduate specialist and master studies.

=== Undergraduate studies ===
Undergraduate studies are organized on the following study groups of the Faculty:

- Law
- Security and Criminalistics

=== Postgraduate specialist studies ===
Postgraduate specialist studies are organized at the following courses of studies:

- Civil Legal
- Criminal Legal
- International Legal
- Business Legal
- Judiciary
- Constitutional Political
- Legal-Historical

== Notable alumni ==
- Mileva Filipović - sociologist and gender studies pioneer (1938-2020)
- Svetozar Marović - President of Serbia and Montenegro (2003-2006)
- Slavko Perović - founder of the Liberal Alliance of Montenegro
- Željko Šturanović - Prime Minister of Montenegro (2006-2008)
- Miodrag Vlahović - Montenegrin ambassador to the United States (2006-2010)
- Boro Vučinić - head of the Montenegrin National Security Agency (2012–present)
- Draginja Vuksanović - president of the Social Democratic Party of Montenegro
