= University of Montenegro Autonomous study program for teacher training in Albanian language =

- Universiteti i Malit të Zi; Programi studimor per arsimimin e mesuesve ne gjuhen shqipe
- Type: Public
- Established: 2004
- Affiliations: University of Montenegro
- Director: David Kalaj
- Location: Podgorica, Montenegro; 42.442722°N 19.240305°E
- Campus: Urban
- Website: www.fm.ac.me

The Autonomous study program for teacher training in Albanian language (Montenegrin: Samostalni studijski program Obrazovanje učitelja na albanskom jeziku, Albanian: Programi studimor per arsimimin e mesuesve ne gjuhen shqipe) is an autonomous study program of the University of Montenegro in Podgorica.

Teaching at the study program is realized by the teachers of the University of Montenegro – Faculty of Philosophy, the University of Tirana and the teachers of the University of Shkodër, according to the Agreement on Cooperation with the University of Montenegro.
