= Bosnians =

People of Bosnia and Herzegovina

Bosanci / Босанци

Total population
- c. 4 million

Regions with significant populations
- Bosnia and Herzegovina: 3,531,159
- Germany: 538,000
- United States: 102,942
- Sweden: 100,017
- Italy: 67,969
- Norway: 50,000
- France: 40,000
- Australia: 39,440
- Canada: 26,740
- Denmark: 23,228

Languages
- Bosnian, Croatian, Serbian

Religion
- Majority: Sunni Islam, Christianity: (Eastern Orthodoxy, Roman Catholicism); Minority: Judaism, Agnosticism, Atheism

Bosnians (Bosnian: Bosanci / Босанци; sg. masc. Bosanac / Босанац, fem. Bosanka / Босанка) are people native to the country of Bosnia and Herzegovina, especially the region of Bosnia. The term is used regardless of ethnic or cultural affiliation. The term Bosnian refers to all inhabitants/citizens of the country, though people from the region of Herzegovina may prefer the demonym Herzegovinian. The term can also be used as a designation for anyone who is descended from Bosnia.

Bosnian as a demonym is a nationality and does not imply any specific ethnic group. The term should not be confused with the ethnonym Bosniak, which refers to the largest ethnic group in the country. The native ethnic groups of Bosnia and Herzegovina are Bosniaks, Bosnian Serbs and Bosnian Croats.

== Terminology ==
In modern English, the term Bosnians is the most commonly used exonym for the general population of Bosnia. In older English literature, inhabitants of Bosnia were sometimes also referred to as Bosniacs or Bosniaks. All of those terms (Bosnians, Bosniacs, Bosniaks) were used interchangeably, as common demonyms for the entire population of Bosnia, including all ethnic and religious groups. When pointing to different religious affiliations within the general population of Bosnia, English authors used common terms like Christian Bosniacs, or Mohammedan Bosniacs, and also Christian Bosniaks, or Mohammedan Bosniaks.

Since the end of the 20th century, when the majority of ethnic Muslims in former Yugoslavia re-affirmed Bosniak as their ethnic designation, that term is primarily used in English as a designation for ethnic Muslims, while the term Bosnians has kept its general meaning, designating all inhabitants of Bosnia.

There was a case to have the right for people to identify themselves as Bosnians in the European Court of Human Rights that won.

== History ==
Territorial expansion of the Bosnian state in the Middle Ages

=== Medieval Bosnians ===
The earliest known record of the name Bosnia as a polity dates from the middle of the 10th century CE, in the Greek form Βόσονα, designating the region. By that time, the Migration Period of the Early Middle Ages was already over. During that turbulent period, from the beginning of the 6th and up to middle of the 7th century, Early Slavs invaded the Byzantine Empire and settled throughout Southeastern Europe. In many regions, they encountered various groups of the previously romanized population of the former Roman provinces of Dalmatia, Praevalitana, Pannonia Secunda, Pannonia Savia and others. The remaining romanized population retreated -mainly to mountainous regions - while South Slavic tribes settled in plains and valleys, gradually coalescing into early principalities. As these expanded, they came to include other surrounding territories, and later evolved into more centralized states.

In the Early Middle Ages, Fine Jr. and Malcolm believe that westernmost parts of modern-day Bosnia and Herzegovina were part of Duchy of Croatia, while the easternmost parts were part of Principality of Serbia, although, the harsh and usually inaccessible elevated terrains of the country most likely never came under direct control of either of the two neighboring Slavic states, and instead always had its own distinct political governance.

During the twelfth century, local rulers developed the Banate of Bosnia, centered in the valley of the river Bosna. There are several theories among linguists and other scholars regarding the origins of the names "Bosnia" and "Bosna" (for the region and the river respectively), and also regarding the relation between those two terms. It is speculated that the name "Bosnia" could come from an older regional term, itself originally derived from the name of the Bosna river, which flows through the heart of the land. From that root, the local demonym derived in the endonym form of Bošnjani, designating the inhabitants of Bosnia.

During the 13th and 14th century, the Banate of Bosnia gradually expanded, incorporating regions of Soli, Usora, Donji Kraji and Zahumlje. Inhabitants of all those regions also kept their regional individuality. By 1377, the Kingdom of Bosnia had formed under the Kotromanić dynasty. It included several territories of medieval Serbia and Croatia. As a consequence, many Eastern Orthodox Christians and Roman Catholics became subjects of Bosnian rulers, along with adherents of a native Bosnian Church whose origins and nature are a subject of continued debate among scholars. Bošnjani became so-called - as political subjects of Bosnian rulers- from the time of Stephen II (r. 1322-1353– ). Those belonging to the so-called Bosnian Church simply called themselves Krstjani ("Christians"). Many scholars classify these Bosnian Krstjani as Manichaean dualists related to the Bogomils of Bulgaria, while others question this theory, citing lack of historical evidence. Both Catholic and Orthodox church authorities considered the Bosnian Church heretical and launched vigorous proselytizing campaigns to stem its influence. As a result of these divisions, no coherent religious identity developed in medieval Bosnia, in contrast to the situations in Croatia and Serbia.

=== Ottoman era ===
When the Ottoman Empire conquered the Bosnian kingdom in 1463, a significant Turkish community arrived in the region. The Turkish community grew steadily throughout the Ottoman rule of Bosnia; however, many Turks immigrated to Turkey when Bosnia and Herzegovina came under Austro-Hungarian rule. Under Ottoman rule, a new and distinct Muslim community developed as a result of the conversion to Islam among a large part of the Bosnian population. Adherents of Islam, Eastern Orthodoxy and Catholicism emerged as the three dominant religious groups that formed the core of Bosnia's society. As a result of the Ottoman conquest, some of Bunjevci migrated to Dalmatia, from there to Lika and the Croatian Littoral, and in the 17th century to Bačka. In the later Ottoman period, Bosnia attracted Muslim refugees from lands that were reconquered by Christian powers (mainly Croatia, Hungary, western Romania and Slovenia).

=== Austro-Hungarian era ===
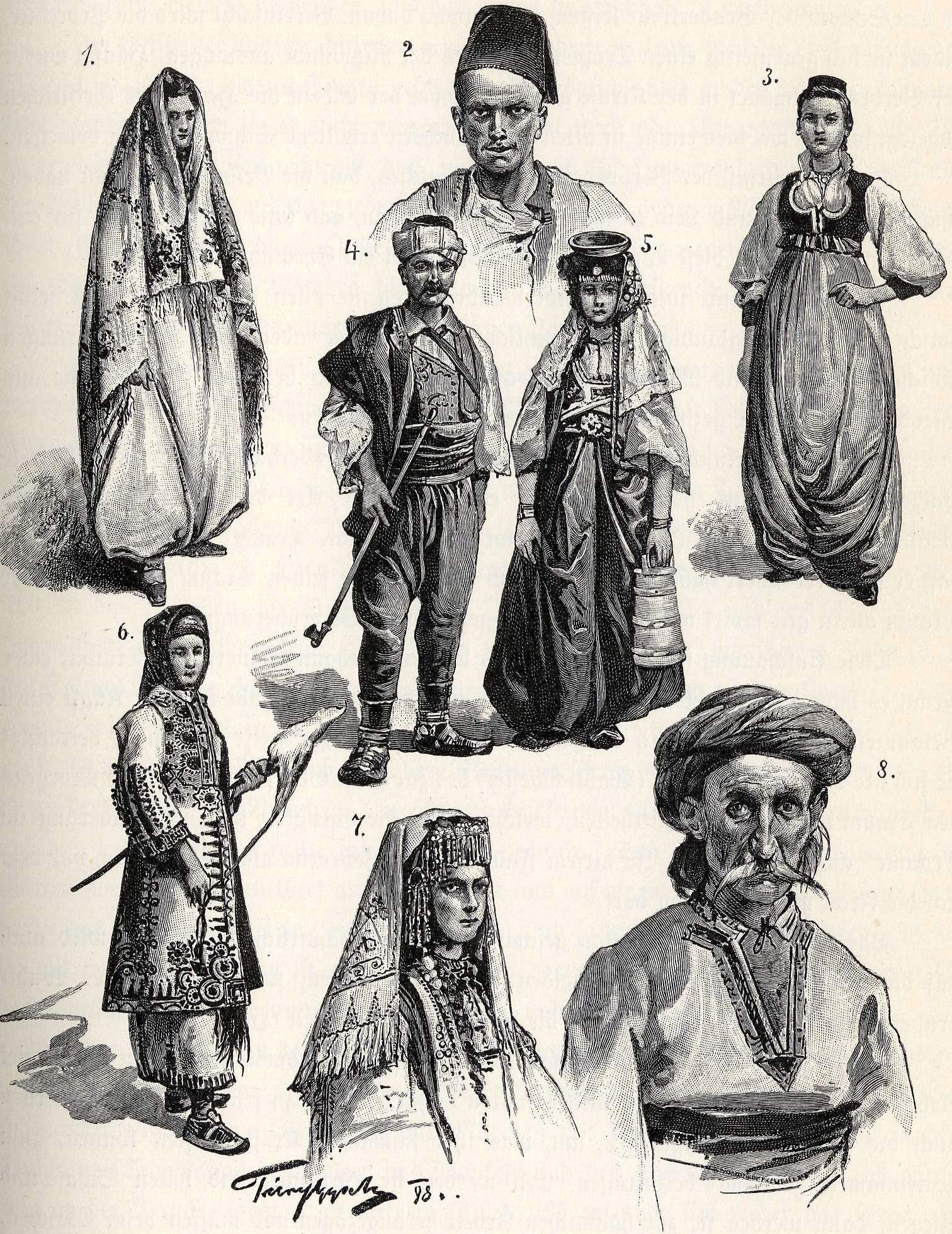
Bosnians at the time of the Austro-Hungarian occupation of Bosnia and Herzegovina.

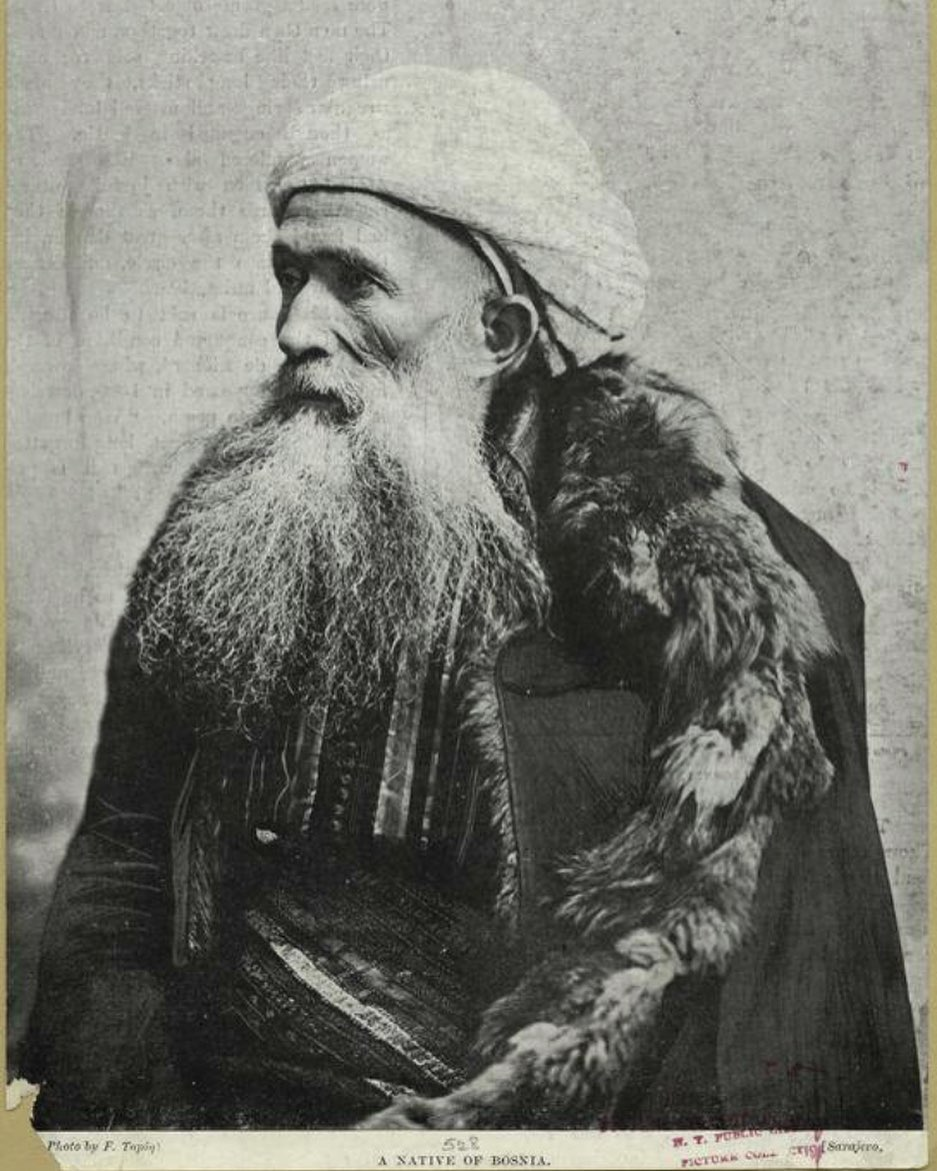
“A Native Of Bosnia” from the book “Living Races of Mankind" ,1902.

During the Austro-Hungarian occupation of Bosnia and Herzegovina from 1878 to 1918, Benjamin Kallay, Joint Imperial Minister of Finance and Vienna-based administrator of Bosnia, promoted Bošnjaštvo, a policy that aimed to inspire in Bosnia's people 'a feeling that they belong to a great and powerful nation'. The policy advocated the ideal of a pluralist and multi-confessional Bosnian nation and viewed Bosnians as "speaking the Bosnian language and divided into three religions with equal rights." The policy tried to isolate Bosnia and Herzegovina from its irredentist neighbors (the Eastern Orthodox in Kingdom of Serbia, Catholics in Kingdom of Croatia, and the Muslims of the Ottoman Empire). The empire tried to discourage the concept of Croat or Serb nationhood, which had spread to Bosnia and Herzegovina's Catholic and Orthodox communities from neighboring Croatia and Serbia in the mid-19th century. Croats and Serbs who opposed the imperial policy and identified with nationalist ideas, ignored claims of Bosnian nationhood and instead counted Bosnian Muslims as part of their own nations, a concept that was rejected by most Bosnian Muslims. Following the death of Kallay, the policy was abandoned. By the latter half of the 1910s, nationalism was an integral factor of Bosnian politics, with national political parties corresponding to the three groups dominating elections for the Diet of Bosnia.

=== Yugoslav era ===
During the period when Yugoslavia was established as a nation, the political establishment in Bosnia and Herzegovina was dominated by Serb and Croat policies; neither of the two terms, Bosnian or Bosniak, was recognized to identify the people as a constituent nation. Consequently, Bosnian Muslims, or anyone who claimed a Bosnian/Bosniak ethnicity, were classified in Yugoslav population statistics as under the category 'regional affiliation.' This classification was used in the last Yugoslav census taken in 1991 in Bosnia and Herzegovina.

The census classifications in former Yugoslavia were often subject to political manipulation because the counting of populations was critical to power of each group. In the constitutional amendments of 1947, Bosnian Muslims requested the option of 'Bosnian.' But, in the 1948 census, they were given only the choices to identify as 'ethnically undeclared Muslim', 'Serb-Muslim' or 'Croat-Muslim' (the vast majority chose the first option). In the 1953 census, the category "Yugoslav, ethnically undeclared" was introduced; the overwhelming majority of those who identified by this category were Bosnian Muslim.

In the 1961 census, the Bosniaks or Bosnian Muslims were categorized as an ethnic group defined as one of 'Muslim-Ethnic affiliation,' but not as a Yugoslav "constitutive nation" alongside Serbs and Croats. In 1964, the Fourth Congress of the Bosnian Party assured the Bosniaks' of the right to self-determination. In 1968 at a meeting of the Bosnian Central Committee, Bosniaks were accepted as a distinct nation, though the leadership decided not to use the Bosniak or Bosnian name. Hence, as a compromise, the option of "Muslims by nationality" was introduced as a category in the 1971 census. This was the official category for use by Bosniaks until the final Yugoslav census in 1991.

=== Modern era ===
In the 1990s the name Bosniaks was introduced to replace the term "Muslim by nationality". This resulted in Bosniak and Muslim sometimes being used interchangeably in political contexts. In the centuries of the Ottoman Empire, distinctions among citizens (for taxation purposes, military service etc.) was made based primarily on the individual's religious identity, which was closely tied to ethnicity.

The decision of a citizen to identify as Bosnian seems to depend on whether they relate their identity more with the Bosnian state or territory as opposed to their religious affiliation, particularly in the case of Bosniaks. The number of people who identified as Bosnians under the latest (2013) population census is not exactly known, however it is not above 2.73%, as this is the number of people who identified as "Others" and "Bosnians" are listed under this "Others" category.

== Religion ==
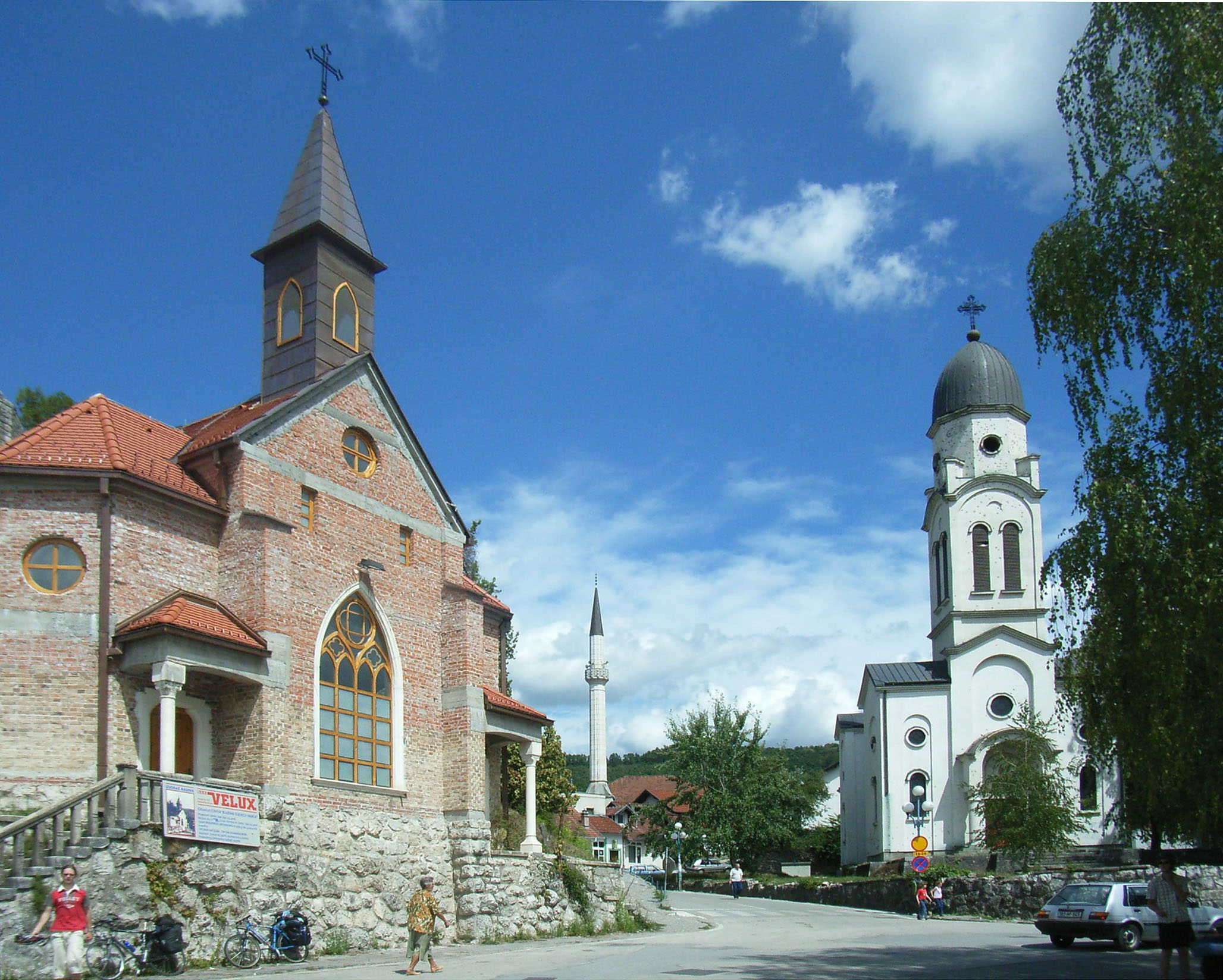
Mosque, Catholic church and Serbian Orthodox Church in Bosanska Krupa

According to the latest population census (2013) of Bosnia and Herzegovina, there were relatively few people who identified as "Bosnians", thereby it is difficult to establish the religious connection between this group of people and some of the religions present in that country.

According to Tone Bringa, an author and anthropologist, she says of Bosnia and Bosnians:

"Neither Bosniak, nor Croat, nor Serb identities can be fully understood with reference only to Islam or Christianity respectively but have to be considered in a specific Bosnian context that has resulted in a shared history and locality among Bosnians of Islamic as well as Christian backgrounds."

According to Bringa, in Bosnia there is a singular, "trans-ethnic culture" that encompassed each ethnicity and makes different faiths, including Christianity and Islam, "synergistically interdependent". Still, large numbers of Bosnians are secular, a trend strengthened in the post-World War II in Bosnia and Herzegovina as they were part of the Communist political system that rejected traditional organized religion.

== Identification ==
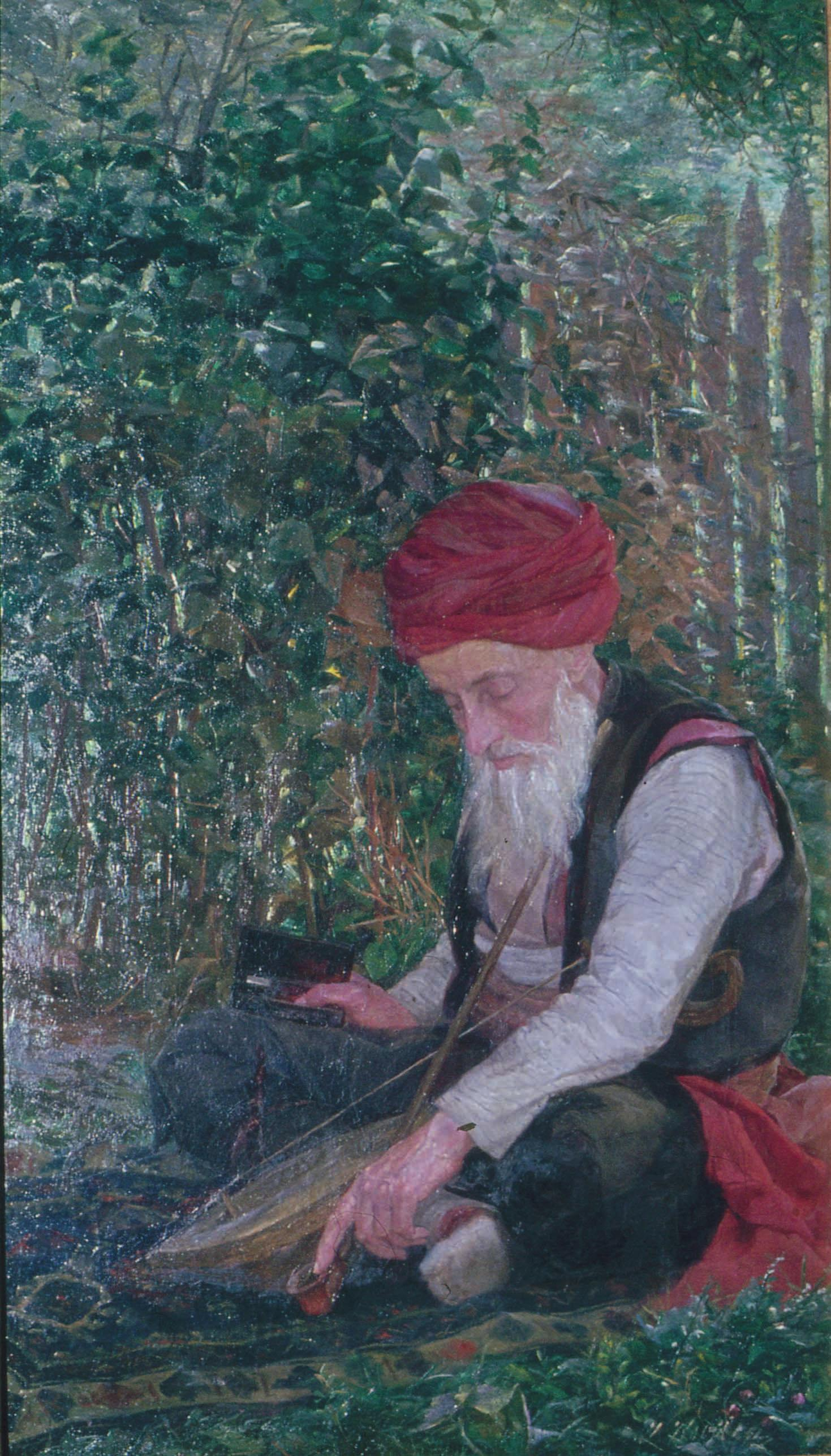
A Bosnian playing gusle, painting by Ivana Kobilca, ca. 1900.

According to the 2013 population census in Bosnia and Herzegovina, most of the population identified with Bosniak (50.1%), Croat (15.4%) or Serb (30.8%) ethnicity. 1.1% identified as "Bosnian", amongst a total of 2.7% who identified as "Others" (including ethnic Muslims, Jews, Roma, etc.). The remainder did not state their ethnicity.

Ethnic minorities in this territory, such as Jews, Roma, Albanians, Montenegrins and others, may consider "Bosnian" as an adjective modifying their ethnicity (e.g. "Bosnian Roma") to indicate place of residence. Other times, they use (with equal rights) the term "Herzegovinians".

In addition, a sizable population in Bosnia and Herzegovina believe that the term "Bosnians" defines a people who constitute a distinct collective cultural identity or ethnic group. According to the latest (2013) census, however, this population does not rise above 1.05%. Of them, 56.65% are Islamic/Muslim, 30.93% are irreligious, 5.15% are Eastern Orthodox and 5.09% are Catholic.

In a 2007 survey conducted by the United Nations Development Programme (UNDP), 57% of those surveyed primarily identified by an ethnic designation, while 43% opted for "being a citizen of Bosnia-Herzegovina". In addition, 75% of the surveyors answered positively to the question "As well as thinking of yourself as a [Bosniak, Croat, Serb], do you also think of yourself as being a citizen of the whole of Bosnia-Herzegovina?". In the same survey, 43% said that they identify as a citizen of Bosnia-Herzegovina as the primary identity, 14% identified with a specific ethnic or religious group, and 41% chose the dual identity.

According to a study conducted by the University of Montenegro, Faculty for Sport and Physical Education in Nikšić, Montenegro and the University of Novi Sad in Serbia, Bosnian people are the tallest in the world.

== See also ==
- Demographics of Bosnia and Herzegovina
- Politics of Bosnia and Herzegovina
- Culture of Bosnia and Herzegovina
- List of Bosnian and Herzegovinian people
- Bosnian diaspora

== Literature ==
- Donia, Robert J.; Fine, John Van Antwerp Jr. (1994). Bosnia and Hercegovina: A Tradition Betrayed. London: Hurst and Company. ISBN 9781850652113.
- Ethnicity/National Affiliation, Religion and Mother Tongue (PDF). Sarajevo: Agency for Statistics of Bosnia and Herzegovina. 2019.
- Evans, Arthur J. (1876). Through Bosnia and the Herzegovina (1st ed.). London: Longmans, Green and Company.
- Fine, John Van Antwerp Jr. (1991) [1983]. The Early Medieval Balkans: A Critical Survey from the Sixth to the Late Twelfth Century. Ann Arbor, Michigan: University of Michigan Press. ISBN 0472081497.
- Fine, John Van Antwerp Jr. (1994) [1987]. The Late Medieval Balkans: A Critical Survey from the Late Twelfth Century to the Ottoman Conquest. Ann Arbor, Michigan: University of Michigan Press. ISBN 0472082604.
- Knight, Charles, ed. (1854). The English Cyclopaedia: A New Dictionary of Universal Knowledge. Vol. 2. London: Bradbury and Evans.
- Moravcsik, Gyula, ed. (1967) [1949]. Constantine Porphyrogenitus: De Administrando Imperio (2nd revised ed.). Washington D.C.: Dumbarton Oaks Center for Byzantine Studies. ISBN 9780884020219.
- Sandwith, Humphry (1865). Notes on the South Slavonic Countries in Austria and Turkey in Europe. Edinburgh and London: William Blackwood and Sons.
- Voules, Horace, ed. (1877). Truth: A Weekly Yournal. Vol. 1. London: Henry Labouchère.
