= University of Montenegro Faculty of Architecture =

Architecture school of the University of Montenegro

- Arhitektonski fakultet Univerziteta Crne Gore
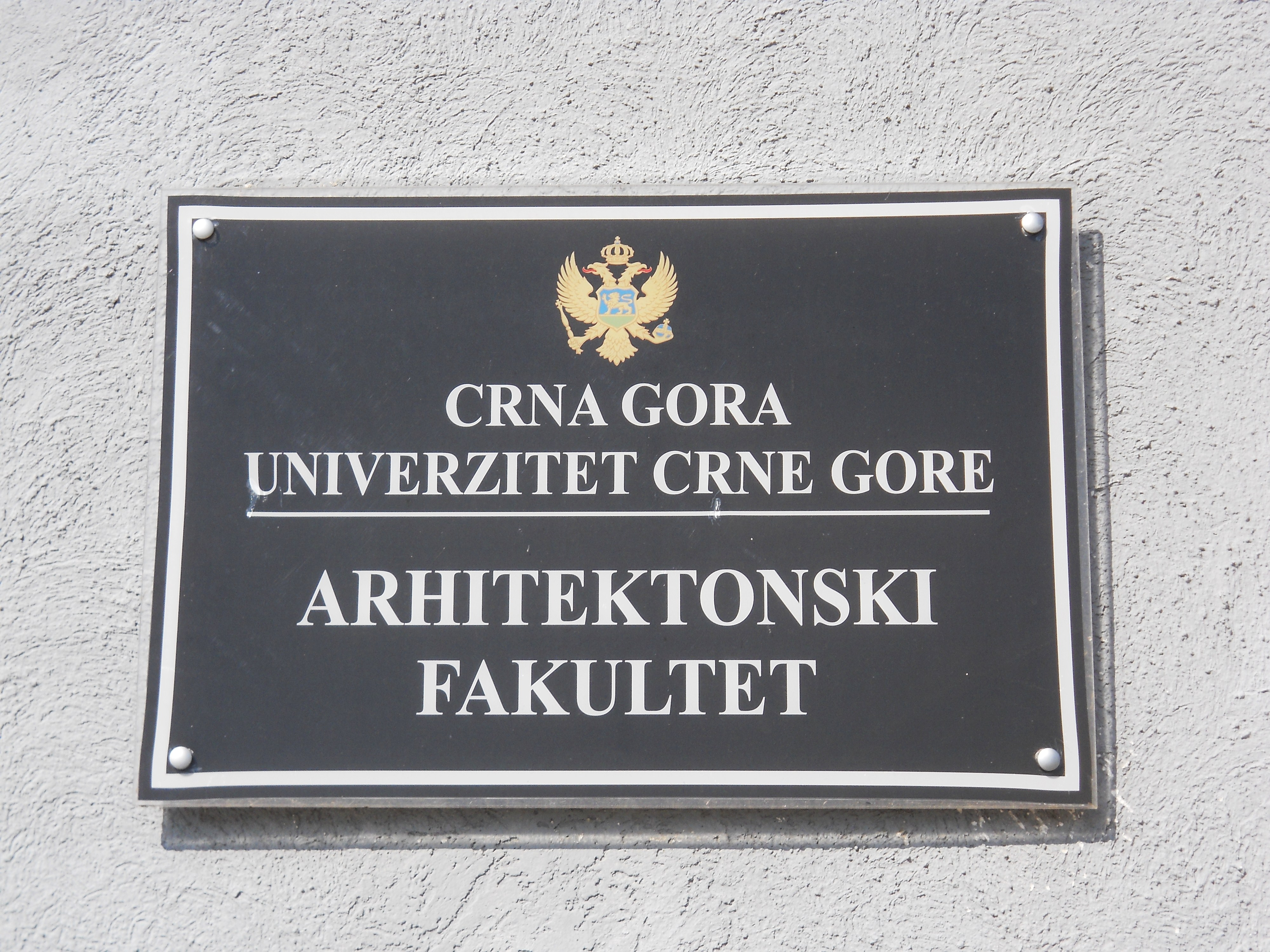
- Type: Public
- Established: 2006
- Affiliations: University of Montenegro
- Dean: Svetlana Perović
- Location: Podgorica, Montenegro; 42.443387°N 19.242505°E
- Campus: Urban
- Website: www.arhitektura.ac.me

The University of Montenegro Faculty of Architecture (Montenegrin: Arhitektonski fakultet Univerziteta Crne Gore Архитектонски факултет Универзитета Црне Горе) is an educational faculty of the University of Montenegro. The building is located in Podgorica, at the University campus.

== History ==
The Architecture Department was founded in 2002, as part of the Faculty of Civil Engineering. In 2006, the Faculty of Architecture was relocated to a separate building and established as an independent educational institute. The Faculty is one of the youngest technical colleges in Montenegro.

== Organization ==
The Faculty of Architecture is an educational and scientific institution that organizes undergraduate, specialist and postgraduate studies as well as doctoral studies. Undergraduate studies are organized on one department of the Faculty, namely: Architecture. Specialist studies are organized on the Department of Design and Department of Urbanism.

Postgraduate studies are organized into seven departments:

- Architectural Space Organization
- Interior Space Architecture
- Constructive Systems
- Urbanistic Space Organization
- Projects and Investment in Construction Management
- Protection and Revitalization of Architectural Heritage
- Bioclimatic and Energetically Efficient Architecture

== Library ==
The Library was established in January 2007. As of 2012, the library was home to more than 2000 library units.
