= University of Montenegro Faculty of Electrical Engineering =

- Elektrotehnički fakultet Univerziteta Crne Gore
- Type: Public
- Established: 1963
- Affiliations: University of Montenegro
- Dean: Budimir Lutovac
- Location: Podgorica, Montenegro; 42.443015°N 19.240595°E
- Campus: Urban
- Website: www.ucg.ac.me/etf

The University of Montenegro Faculty of Electrical Engineering (Montenegrin: Elektrotehnički fakultet Univerziteta Crne Gore Електротехнички факултет Универзитета Црне Горе) is one of the educational institutions of the University of Montenegro. Its main building is located in Podgorica, at the University campus.

== History ==
Studies of Electrical Engineering were established in 1961, and two years later the Technical Faculty with the Department for Electrical Engineering was established in Podgorica. It was a part of the University of Belgrade until April 29, 1974, when the Agreement on Association into the University of Titograd (today's University of Montenegro) was signed with the representatives of the Faculty of Law, the Faculty of Economics, the Teaching College from Nikšić, the Maritime Studies College from Kotor and three independent scientific institutes from Titograd.

The following faculties have evolved from the Faculty of Electrical Engineering:

- Faculty of Civil Engineering
- Faculty of Metallurgy and Technology
- Faculty of Mechanical Engineering
- Faculty of Mathematics and Natural Sciences

In 2007, the Applied Computer Sciences study group of the Faculty of Electrical Engineering was established in Berane.

== Organization ==
The Faculty of Electrical Engineering represents a complex, modernly organized teaching and scientific institution. Within its teaching activities, the Faculty organizes and realizes undergraduate, specialist, postgraduate and doctoral studies.

=== Undergraduate studies ===
Undergraduate academic studies at the Faculty are organized through two study groups:

- Energy and Automatics
- Electronics, Telecommunications and Computers

Undergraduate applied studies are organized through the Applied Computer Sciences study group.

=== Postgraduate studies ===
Postgraduate specialist and master academic studies are organized through two study groups:

- Applied Computer Sciences
- Energy and Automatics, with the course of studies Electrical Engineering Systems, Industrial Electrical Engineering and Automatics
- Electronics, Telecommunications and Computers, with the course of studies Computer Sciences, Telecommunications and Electronics

Postgraduate specialist and master applied studies are organized through the Applied Computer Science study group.

== Notable alumni and professors ==
Among the most notable alumni and members of the academic staff of the Faculty of Electrical Engineering are:

- Milica Pejanović-Đurišić - politician, former Minister of Defence of Montenegro.
- Momir Đurović - former president of the Montenegrin Academy of Sciences and Arts
- Ljubiša Stanković - former Rector (2003-2008) and President of University Board (2008-2011) of the University of Montenegro; former Ambassador of Montenegro to United Kingdom; Fellow IEEE
- Nebojša Medojević - politician, founder and current leader of the opposition Movement for Changes (PzP).
- Radovan Stojanović - establisher of MECO, ECYPS and CPSIoT Conferences, in addition to his research achievements, known for his work in accelerating science and technology in the Western Balkan and the Mediterranean,
