= List of people from Podgorica =

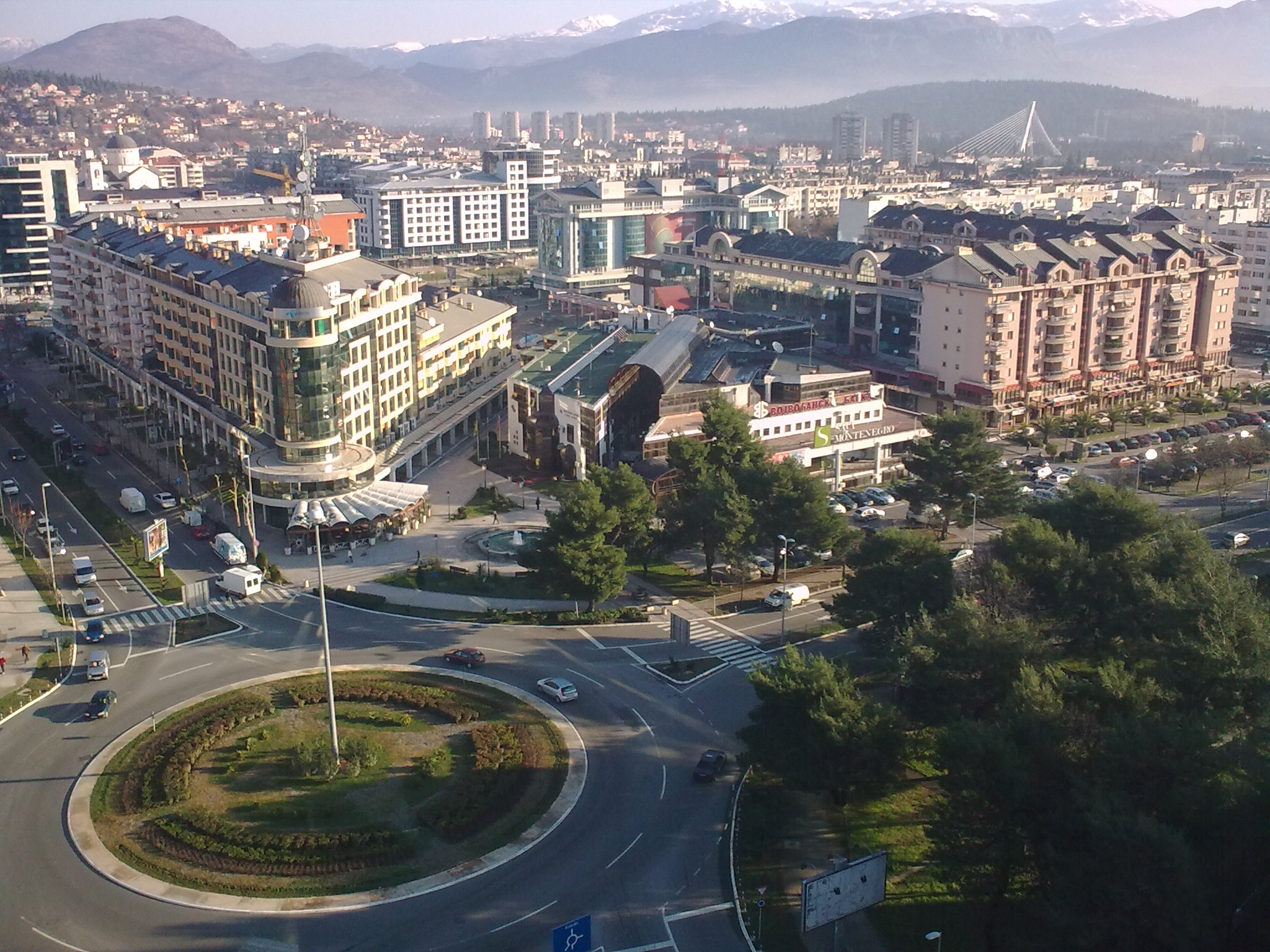
Podgorica

The following is a list of notable people who were born in Podgorica, Montenegro.

- Anđela Bulatović, handball player
- Nikola Bulatović, basketball player
- Sergej Ćetković, pop singer
- Mileva Filipović, sociologist
- Zoran Filipović, football player and coach
- Blažo Jovanović, communist politician
- Stevan Jovetić, football player
- Slavko Kalezić, singer and actor
- Nenad Knežević "Knez", pop singer
- Predrag Mijatović, football player
- Marko Miljanov, general, clan chief and writer
- Nikola Mirotić, Spanish basketball player
- Ljiljana Mugoša, handball player
- Borislav Pekić, novelist
- Svetlana Mugoša-Antić, handball player
- Stefan Nemanja, founder of the Nemanjić dynasty
- Duško Radinović, football player
- Dejan Radonjić, basketball player and coach
- Milos Raonic, Canadian tennis player
- Ilarion Roganović, metropolitan of Montenegro and the Highlands
- Refik Šabanadžović, football player
- Dejan Savićević, football player
- Vojo Stanić, sculptor and painter
- Risto Stijović, sculptor and painter
- Ivan Strugar, kickboxer
- Duško Vujošević, Montenegrin basketball coach
- Simon Vukčević, football player
- Božidar Vuković, one of the first South Slavic printers
- Dejan Zlatičanin, boxer

== See also ==
- Podgorica Capital City
