= Marijeta Mojašević =

Montenegrin social worker and activist

Marijeta Mojasevic is a Montenegrin youth advisor and disability rights activist, named one of the 100 BBC most influential women in the world for her work in youth activism and disability empowerment.

== Early life and education ==
Mojasevic was born in Berane in 1988. She suffered a stroke in the summer of 2003 when she was in high school, followed by another half a year later. As a result, she suffered a partial loss of the right side, and diplopia double vision.

She studied at University of Montenegro in the Faculty of Political Science/Department Social Policy and Social Work to become a social worker. She gained her BSc in 2011 and since 2020 has been studying at the same university for her MSc.

== Career ==
During her career, Mojasevic was a Youth Advisor at local Youth Office in Montenegro since 2015, and since 2016 she frequently facilitated workshops with elementary, high school and student population on the topic “Life with disability”, as a stroke survivor.

In 2019, she started her mandate at the Advisory Council on Youth Council of Europe as a Rapporteur on Mainstreaming Disability Issues. Her role is to inform the Joint Council on Youth of key developments relating to the human rights of young people with disabilities and to take the lead on actions to mainstream disability within the Council of Europe Youth Department's programme of activities.

She is an ambassador for OneNeurology, an initiative which aims to make neurological conditions a global public health priority and to bring together and empower groups focused on neurology to work together for better advocacy, action, and accountability.

Mojasevic was named one of the most influential women in the top 100 BBC women in the world due to her innovative and inspiring methods of working with young people. She uses her voice to challenge attitudes and behavior towards people with neurological disorders.

== See also ==
- 100 Women (BBC)
