= Momčilo Macanović =

Montenegrian painter

- Момчило Мацановић
- Born: 1966 (age 59–60); Nikšić, Montenegro
- Education: Faculty of Fine Arts, Cetinje
- Known for: Painting, sculpture
- Movement: Metaphysical painting, Magic realism, figurative art

Momčilo Macanović (Serbian Cyrillic: Момчило Мацановић; born 1966) is a Montenegrin painter and sculptor. He graduated from the Faculty of Fine Arts, Cetinje, where he studied sculpture, but subsequently focused primarily on painting. His work has been associated with figurative art, metaphysical painting and magic realism.

Macanović lives and works in Tivat, Montenegro, and has exhibited in Montenegro and internationally.

== Biography ==
Momčilo Macanović was born in 1966 in Nikšić, Montenegro. In 1993 he graduated from the Faculty of Fine Arts in Cetinje, where he studied sculpture in the class of professor Pavle Pejović.

During his studies, Macanović received the faculty's first prize for sculpture. He has been a member of the Association of Visual Artists of Montenegro (ULUCG) since 1994.

After completing his studies in sculpture, Macanović turned primarily to painting. His training as a sculptor has influenced his treatment of figures and space, with his painted forms often possessing a pronounced three-dimensional quality.

Macanović has participated in more than 50 group exhibitions in Montenegro and abroad, as well as in numerous international artists' colonies. He lives and works in Tivat, where his work has been associated with the contemporary art scene of the Bay of Kotor.

== Artistic work ==
Macanović's painting is figurative in character and has been associated in art criticism and reference works with metaphysical painting and magic realism. His compositions are characterised by precise drawing, carefully modelled forms, an emphasis on light and shadow, and a Mediterranean atmosphere.

His subject matter frequently draws on everyday life in the Bay of Kotor, Tivat and other small coastal settlements. His paintings depict streets, squares, harbours, interiors of Boka houses, ships and boats, passers-by, fishermen and sailors, as well as objects associated with the coastal environment.

Old automobiles, bicycles, boats and other objects bearing traces of the past frequently appear in his paintings. By combining contemporary scenes with elements associated with earlier periods, Macanović creates images characterised by a sense of suspended time and visual memory.

Light and shadow occupy an important place in his work. His paintings have been described as having a Mediterranean light and refined colour palette, creating an atmosphere between an observed scene and a metaphysical interpretation.

Macanović primarily works in oil on canvas and has also worked in watercolour. His artistic development has been influenced by the early Italian Renaissance, Renaissance realism and the painting of Flemish masters.

Macanović has described his approach as precise figuration rather than photorealism. His compositions may contain grotesque or humorous details, while individual paintings can develop from a particular detail or motif that attracts his attention.

Critics have noted a metaphysical dimension in his paintings, including static figures, precisely rendered details and a sense of suspended time. His work has also been discussed in relation to the visual language of the Old Masters, particularly in its precise arrangement of compositional elements and attention to detail.

Macanović has stated that his immediate surroundings are an important source for his work, while also distinguishing his painting from a direct continuation of the tradition of Montenegrin painting. He has described his approach as based on figuration and a personal interpretation of reality, with the aim of developing an individual visual language.

== Exhibitions ==
=== Solo exhibitions ===
According to Galerija Pizana, Macanović has held solo exhibitions in Belgrade, Tivat, Kotor, Herceg Novi, Podgorica, Pljevlja, Piran, Geneva, Ljubljana and other cities.

- 1997 – KNU Gallery, Belgrade
- 1997 – Buća Gallery, Tivat
- 1997 – Kotor, Old Town
- 1998 – Spinaker Gallery, Herceg Novi
- 1998 – Pizana Gallery, Podgorica
- 2002 – Buća Gallery, Tivat
- 2003 – Art Gallery, Belgrade
- 2004 – Studio Gašpar, Piran
- 2004 – Montenegro Stars Art Gallery, Bečići
- 2004 – Vitomir Srbljanović Gallery, Pljevlja
- 2006 – Mercator Gallery, Ljubljana
- 2006 – Europ'Art, Geneva
- 2007 — Štanjel, Slovenia
- 2008 – Artita Gallery, Piran
- 2010 — Čigota Gallery, Zlatibor
- 2011 – Belgrade City Gallery, Belgrade
- 2011 – Buća Summer House Gallery, Tivat
- 2011 – Buća Gallery, Tivat; an exhibition of approximately 40 works described as a series of "metaphysical art poems" and "magic realism"
- 2012 – Buća Summer House Gallery, Tivat
- 2012 — Hilandar Monastery, Greece
- 2013 – Pizana Gallery, Podgorica
- 2014 – Europ'Art, Geneva
- 2015 – Mercator Gallery, Ljubljana
- 2016 – Vitomir Srbljanović Art Gallery, Pljevlja
- 2017 – Montenegro Stars Art Gallery, Bečići
- 2018 – Studio Gašpar Gallery, Piran
- 2019 – Art Gallery, Belgrade
- 2020 – Buća Summer House Gallery, Tivat
- 2021 – Pizana Gallery, Podgorica
- 2022 – Spinaker Gallery, Herceg Novi
- 2023 – Stari Grad Gallery, Kotor
- 2024 – Buća Summer House Gallery, Tivat
- 2025 – KNU Gallery, Belgrade

During the 2010s Macanović also exhibited at the Belgrade City Library and participated, through his association with Galerija Pizana, in the Europe Art fair in Geneva.

=== Group exhibitions ===
Macanović has participated in more than 50 group exhibitions in Montenegro and abroad.

Among the exhibitions in which he participated was Recent Montenegrin Painting (Recentno crnogorsko slikarstvo), held in 2000 at the Parliament of Austria in Vienna, as well as in Graz and Linz. He also participated in Memories and Relations (Memorije i relacije), an exhibition of the first generation of the Faculty of Fine Arts of the University of Montenegro in Cetinje, held at Galerija Pizana in Podgorica in 2015.

He has also participated in international artists' colonies including Štanjel in Slovenia, Artita in Piran, Čigota on Zlatibor, and Hilandar, as well as artists' colonies in Croatia, Greece, Serbia and Montenegro.

== Awards and recognition ==
- 1993 – First Prize for Sculpture, Faculty of Fine Arts, Cetinje
- 2005 – Painting Prize at the Ex-tempore exhibition in Piran, Slovenia
- 2012 – First Prize for the painting Cyclist (Biciklista) at the Diversity of Togetherness (Različitost zajedništva) exhibition in Kovin, according to Galerija Pizana
- 2013 – Painting Prize at the Ex-tempore event in Piran

== Collections and representation ==
Macanović's works are held in public and private collections in Montenegro and abroad. His work has also been represented through the international online art platform Saatchi Art.

In January 2024, the Tivat Museum and Gallery received Macanović's painting Vespa, an oil on canvas measuring 70 × 50 cm, as a donation. The museum's collection already included his works Trumpeter, Boats and Top.

== Artistic philosophy ==
In Macanović's paintings, everyday scenes from the Bay of Kotor and Tivat are presented as carefully structured visual compositions in which time, space and objects play important roles. Human figures are often static, while objects and architectural elements serve important compositional functions.

His work combines a realistic approach to subject matter, precise rendering of details and a metaphysical atmosphere. Art criticism has connected his work with the Old Masters, particularly because of the precision with which compositional elements are arranged and details are rendered.

Macanović has described his creative process as unpredictable: an initial idea may change during the execution of a painting under the influence of a detail that emerges on the canvas. He has described his artistic practice as part of his life and painting as a process in which the idea develops during the act of working.

== Bibliography ==
- Miranović, Anastazija. Tivatski slikari. Tivat, 2015.
- Lompar, Miodrag. Crnogorski slikari. Podgorica, 2010.
- Nikčević, N. Leksikon crnogorskih umjetnika, 1946–2001. Podgorica, 2001.
- Slovinić, S. Ars Libris (1999–2012). Podgorica, 2013.
- Momčilo Macanović: Pozorište senki / Theatre of Shadows. Belgrade: Galerija Trezor, 1996. The catalogue is recorded in the COBISS database and contains texts in Serbian and English.
- Momčilo Macanović. Podgorica: Galerija Pizana, 1999. The catalogue contains biographical and bibliographical information about the artist.
- Momčilo Macanović. Podgorica: Galerija Pizana, 2006. ISBN 86-908223-0-5. The catalogue contains texts by Olga Perović and others and includes biographical information about the artist.
- Recent Montenegrin Painting (Recentno crnogorsko slikarstvo), exhibition catalogue, Association of Visual Artists of Montenegro, Podgorica, 2000.
