= University of Montenegro Faculty of Drama =

- Fakultet Dramskih Umjetnosti; Univerziteta Crne Gore
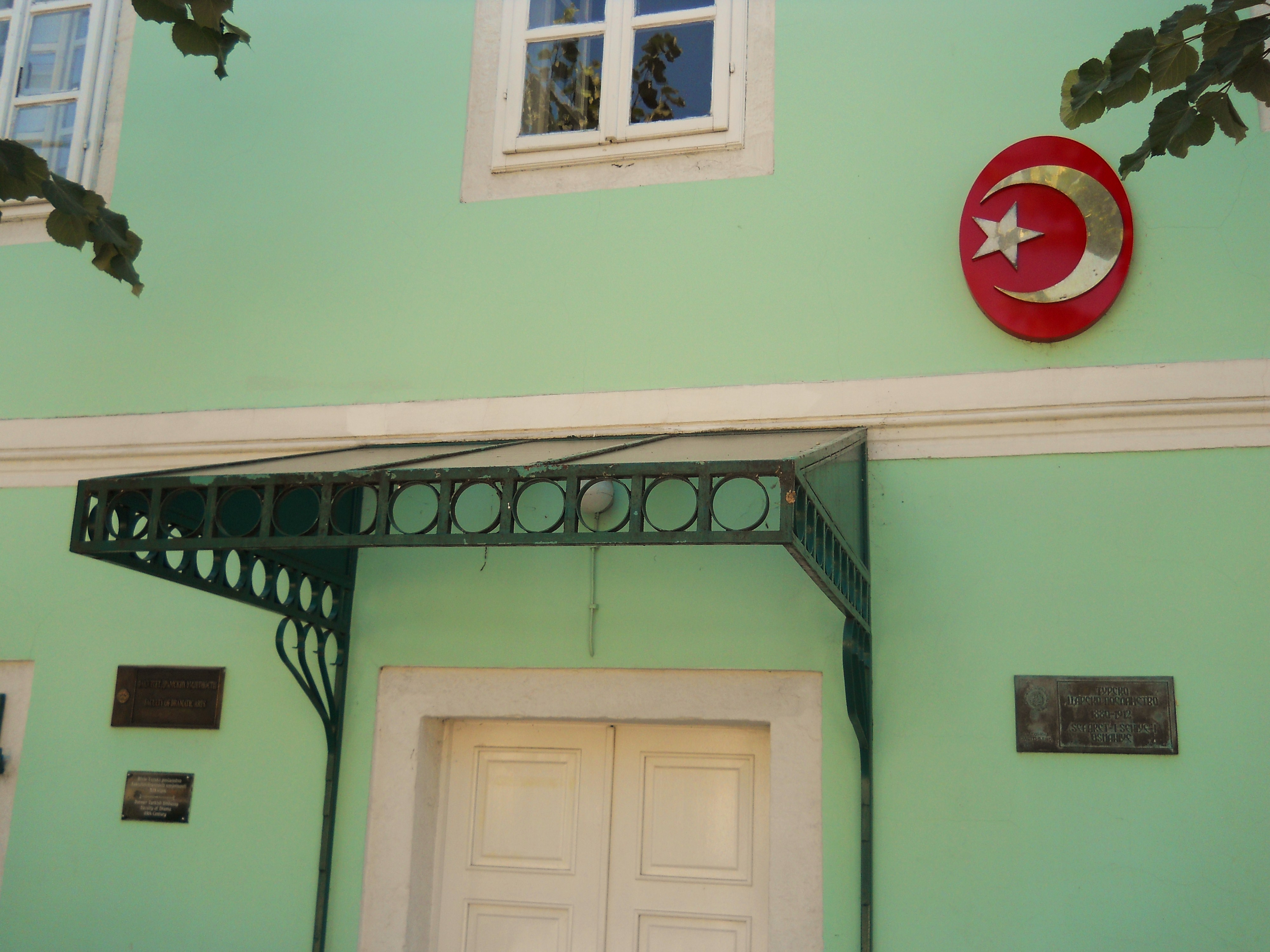
- Type: Public
- Established: 1997
- Affiliations: University of Montenegro
- Dean: Radmila Vojvodić
- Location: Cetinje, Montenegro; 42.387989°N 18.926577°E
- Campus: Urban
- Website: www.fdu.ac.me

The University of Montenegro Faculty of Drama (Montenegrin: Fakultet Dramskih Umjetnosti Univerziteta Crne Gore Факултет Драмских Умјетности Универзитета Црне Горе) is one of the educational institutions of the University of Montenegro. The Faculty is located in Cetinje, in the building of the former Turkish embassy to Montenegro.

== History ==
The Faculty of Drama in Cetinje started its work in the academic year 1994/95, as a department of the Faculty of Fine Arts. In September 1997 it was established as an independent university unit.

== Organization ==
Undergraduate and postgraduate specialist studies at the Faculty are provided for the following study groups:

- Acting
- Directing
  - Theater direction
  - Film and TV direction
- Production
- Dramaturgy

The Faculty of Drama organizes postgraduate master studies for three study groups:

- Acting
- Directing
- Production

== Academic staff ==
Some of the current members of the academic staff are:

- Nikola Vukčević - Montenegrin film director
- Branislav Mićunović - former Minister of Culture of Montenegro
- Marija Perović - Montenegrin film director
- Boro Stjepanović - Bosnian actor and director
