= University of Montenegro Faculty of Metallurgy and Technology =

- Metalurško-tehnološki fakultet Univerziteta Crne Gore
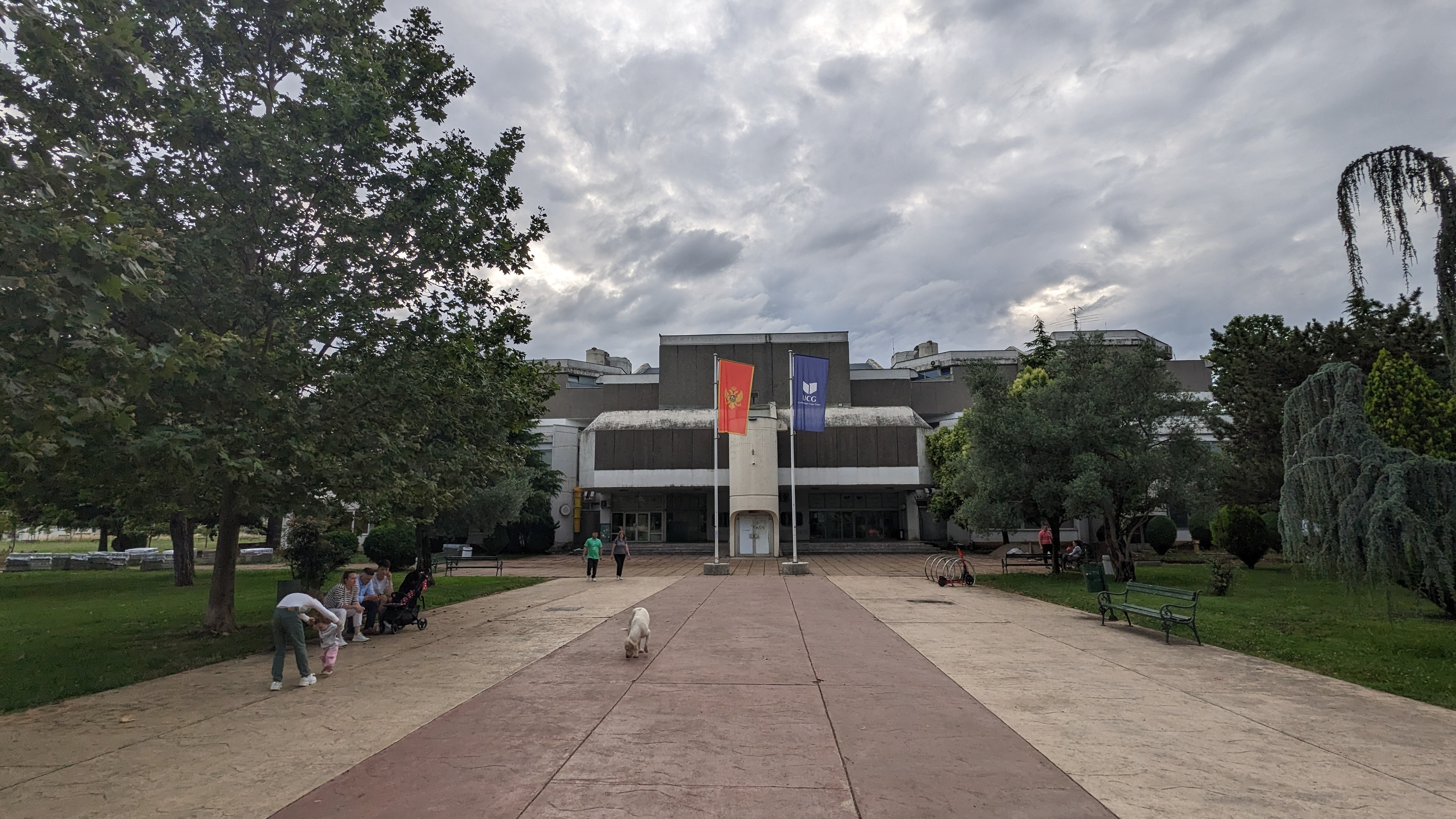
- Type: Public
- Established: 1978
- Affiliations: University of Montenegro
- Dean: Veselinka Grudić
- Location: Podgorica, Montenegro; 42.443015°N 19.240595°E
- Campus: Urban
- Website: www.mtf.ac.me

The University of Montenegro Faculty of Metallurgy and Technology (Montenegrin: Metalurško-tehnološki fakultet Univerziteta Crne Gore Металуршко-технолошки факултет Универзитета Црне Горе) is one of the educational institutions of the University of Montenegro. Its building is located in Podgorica, at the University campus.

== History ==
In 1973, the Studies of Metallurgy were established as a department of the Faculty of Electrical Engineering in Podgorica. The Department of Metallurgy was transformed into the Faculty of Metallurgy in 1978.

In 1990, the Inorganic Technology Studies were established, and the Faculty got its current name - Faculty of Metallurgy and Technology. Study program Environmental Protection was founded in 2005.

== Organization ==
Within its teaching activity, the Faculty organizes academic undergraduate, specialist, postgraduate and doctoral studies, applied undergraduate studies and other forms of professional development.

The Faculty of Metallurgy and Technology includes the following study groups:

- Metallurgy
- Chemical Technology
- Environmental Protection
