= University of Montenegro Faculty of Medicine =

- Medicinski fakultet Univerziteta Crne Gore
- Type: Public
- Established: 1997
- Affiliations: University of Montenegro
- Dean: Prof. dr Miodrag Radunović
- Location: Podgorica, Montenegro; 42.436594°N 19.244565°E
- Campus: Urban

The University of Montenegro Faculty of Medicine (Montenegrin: Medicinski fakultet Univerziteta Crne Gore Медицински факултет Универзитета Црне Горе) is one of the educational institutions of the University of Montenegro. The Faculty's main building is located in Podgorica, near the Clinical Center of Montenegro.

== History ==
The Podgorica Medical School was officially established in 1997. In 2005, as part of the Faculty, the postgraduate High School for Nurses was founded in Berane.

== Organization ==
The Faculty is a teaching-scientific institution which organizes the practical part of teaching in the teaching-scientific bases: Clinical Center of Montenegro, Public Health Institute, Institute Dr Simo Milošević in Igalo, Hospital for Pulmonary Diseases Brezovik and various health centers. Five study groups are currently being provided at the Faculty:

- Undergraduate Academic Studies:
  - Medicine
  - Dentistry
  - Pharmacy
- Applied Studies (at the High School for Nurses in Berane)
- Doctoral studies
- Specialization of Medical Workers
