= University of Montenegro Faculty for Sport and Physical Education =

- Fakultet za sport i fizičko vaspitanje Univerziteta Crne Gore
- Type: Public
- Established: 2009
- Affiliations: University of Montenegro
- Dean: Duško Bjelica
- Location: Nikšić, Montenegro; 42.774676°N 18.960974°E
- Campus: Urban
- Website: www.fsnk.ac.me

The University of Montenegro Faculty for Sport and Physical Education (Montenegrin: Fakultet za sport i fizičko vaspitanje Univerziteta Crne Gore Факултет за спорт и физичко васпитање Универзитета Црне Горе) is one of the educational institutions of the University of Montenegro. Its building is located in Nikšić.

== History ==
The Department for Physical Culture existed in Nikšić since 1963, as part of the Teaching Faculty (later Faculty of Philosophy). In the academic year 2008/2009, the Faculty for Sport and Physical Culture was officially opened.

== Organization ==
Undergraduate studies are organized at the Faculty on the following study programs:

- Physical Culture
- Education of Sport Journalists
- Education of Coaches

Postgraduate specialist and master studies are organized for the study program Physical Culture.
