= List of universities in Montenegro =

This is a list of universities in Montenegro.

== Public ==
- University of Montenegro, Podgorica

== Private ==
- University of Donja Gorica, Podgorica
- Mediterranean University, Podgorica

Private faculties

- Faculty of Business and Tourism, Budva
- Faculty of Management in Traffic & Communications, Budva
- Faculty of Liberal Arts and Sciences, Budva
- Faculty of Management, Herceg Novi
- Faculty of State and European Studies, Podgorica
- Faculty of Mediterranean Business Studies, Tivat
