= Radovan Stojanović =

- Stojanović in April 2011, Podgorica
- Born: November 18, 1965 (age 60); Ivangrad (now Berane), Yugoslavia (now Montenegro)
- Education: University of Montenegro; B.S. Ing. (1990), M.Sc. (1995); University of Patras; D.Sc. (2001)
- Scientific career
- Fields: Electrical engineering, Electronics, Biomedical engineering, Applied Electronics and Instrumentation Engineering, Electronic circuit simulation, FPGA
- Workplaces: University of Montenegro
- Website: Google Scholar rStojanovicWebPage

Radovan Stojanović is a Professor of Electrical Engineering at the University of Montenegro, Montenegro and Founder and President of the Montenegrin Association for New Technologies (MANT). He is a member of the Board of the Montenegrin Academy of Sciences and Arts for Natural and Technical Sciences.

== Biography ==
Stojanović received his Bachelor of Science and Master of Science in Electrical Engineering in 1990 and 1995 respectively, from the University of Montenegro, Montenegro. He completed his doctoral thesis in Electrical Engineering and Computer Technology in the field of machine vision from University of Patras, Greece in 2001. In 2012 he founded the Montenegrin Association for New Technologies MANT. In 2008 he became a member of the Board of Montenegrin Academy of Sciences and Arts for Natural and Technical Sciences. Radovan Stojanović established the Advanced Electronics Group at the University of Montenegro, Podgorica, Montenegro. Stojanović is director of the EUROMICRO Association for Montenegro and a member of the EUROMICRO European Board. His research on Electrical engineering covers Biomedical engineering, FPGA, Electronic circuit simulation, Applied Electronics and Instrumentation Engineering. He has been organising MECO(Mediterranean Conference on Embedded Computing) for the past 6 years with a lot of success, having invited numerous Nobel prize laureates.

== Research ==
Stojanović works in the field of machine vision and biomedical engineering. His main contribution in the field of machine vision is development of the real-time vision-based system for textile fabric inspection. In the field of biomedical engineering, his main contribution is development of LED-based photoplethysmogram sensors and development of the FPGA system for QRS complex detection based on Integer Wavelet Transform. Stojanović's professional activities include the introduction of new technologies, advancement of science and education values in the Western Balkan Region and the Mediterranean, where he helped in establishing of several research and educational institutions, spin-off companies, associations and professional and academic events. He is an initiator and the Chairman of Mediterranean Conference on Embedded Computing covered by IEEE, which significantly promotes scientific activity and cooperation in the region.

== Publications ==
- Real-time vision-based system for textile fabric inspection, R Stojanovic, P Mitropulos, C Koulamas, Y Karayiannis, S Koubias, ..., Real-Time Imaging 7 (6), 507-518 (2001)
- Defect detection and classification on web textile fabric using multiresolution decomposition and neural networks, YA Karayiannis, R Stojanovic, P Mitropoulos, C Koulamas, T Stouraitis, ..., Electronics, Circuits and Systems, 1999. Proceedings of ICECS'99. The 6th IEEE International Conference on (1999)
- An LED-based photoplethysmography sensor, R Stojanovic, D Karadaglic, Physiological measurement 28 (6), N19 (2007)
- An architecture for the VLSI design of systems for time-frequency analysis and time-varying filtering, S Stanković, L Stanković, V Ivanović, R Stojanović, Annales des Telecommunications 57 (9-10), 974-995 (2002)
- Multiple-clock-cycle architecture for the VLSI design of a system for time-frequency analysis, VN Ivanović, R Stojanović, LJ Stanković, EURASIP journal on applied signal processing 2006, 70-70 (2006)
- A FPGA system for QRS complex detection based on Integer Wavelet Transform, R Stojanović, D Karadaglić, M Mirković, D Milošević, Measurement Science Review 11 (4), 131-138 (2011)
- Real-time vision system for defect detection and neural classification of web textile fabric, P Mitropoulos, C Koulamas, RD Stojanovic, S Koubias, ..., Machine Vision Applications in Industrial Inspection VII 3652, 59-70 (1999)
- An approach for automated inspection of wood boards, S Radovan, P George, M Panagiotis, G Manos, A Robert, D Igor, Image Processing, 2001. Proceedings. 2001 International Conference on 1, 798-801 (2001)
- An efficient hardware design of the flexible 2-D system for space/spatial-frequency signal analysis, Veselin N Ivanovic, Radovan D Stojanovic, IEEE transactions on signal processing 55 (6), 3116-3125 (2007)
- Speech-controlled cloud-based wheelchair platform for disabled persons, A Škraba, R Stojanović, A Zupan, A Koložvari, D Kofjač, Microprocessors and Microsystems 39 (8), 819-828 (2015)
- Optimization and implementation of the wavelet based algorithms for embedded biomedical signal processing, R Stojanović, S Knežević, D Karadaglić, G Devedžić, Computer Science and Information Systems 10 (1), 503-523 (2013)

== Editorial work ==
Stojanović is an editorial board member of the International Journal of Circuits and Architecture Design and of the journal Recent Advances in Photonics and Optics. He is also the guest editor of the journal Microprocessors and Microsystems - EMBEDDED HARDWARE DESIGN, Elsevier, Special Issue on Embedded and Cyber-Physical Systems.
