= University of Montenegro Faculty of Biotechnology =

Educational institution

University of Montenegro Biotechnical Faculty
- Biotehnički fakultet Univerziteta Crne Gore
- Type: Public
- Established: 1961
- Affiliations: University of Montenegro
- Dean: Božidarka Marković
- Location: Podgorica, Montenegro; 42.44372°N 19.243915°E
- Campus: Urban
- Website: www.btf.ac.me

The University of Montenegro Biotechnical Faculty (Montenegrin: Biotehnički fakultet Univerziteta Crne Gore Биотехнички факултет Универзитета Црне Горе) is one of the educational institutions of the University of Montenegro. The building is located in Podgorica, at the University campus.

== History ==
Scientific research in agriculture in Montenegro was established in 1937, when the Ministry of Agriculture of the Kingdom of Yugoslavia decided to establish the experimental State Research Station for Southern Cultures in Bar. After World War II, the founding of new institutions and renewal of previously existing ones followed, such as:

- the Institute for Agricultural Research in Podgorica (1945)
- the Institute for Animal Husbandry (Livestock) in Nikšić
- the Institute for Southern Cultures and Viticulture in Bar (1947)
- Soil Testing Units in Bar (1949)
- Veterinary Diagnostic Units in Titograd (1950) and
- the Centre for Fruit Growing in Bijelo Polje (1952).

The Agricultural Institute was established in 1961, as a result of merging the above-mentioned institutions. It functioned under that name until 1997, when it was transformed into the Biotechnical Institute by including the Forestry Sector into one unique scientific research institution. By establishing the Studies of Agriculture, in 2005, the Institute developed into a faculty, and in 2008 formally changed its name into the Biotechnical Faculty.

== Organization ==
The Biotechnical Faculty has adequately equipped classrooms and laboratories situated in the Faculty's buildings in Podgorica, Bar and Bijelo Polje, as well as experimental plots for a part of students’ professional practice and organization of Faculty production.

=== Undergraduate academic studies ===
The undergraduate academic studies are divided in two study groups:

- Plant production
- Animal production, both in Podgorica

The undergraduate professional studies organised in two groups:

- Undergraduate applied studies of Continental fruit growing and medical plants in Bijelo Polje
- Undergraduate applied studies of Mediterranean fruit growing in Bar

=== Master studies ===
The academic master studies are organized on the following groups:

- Fruit, viticulture and wine growing
- Cultivation of soil and vegetable growing
- Plant protection
- Technologies in Animal production
- Agrobusines and Rural development
- Food safety

The professional master studies are organisaed on two groups:

- Nursering production
- Continental fruits and medical plants

=== Doctoral studies ===
- Biotechnics
