= University of Montenegro Faculty of Fine Arts =

- Факултет Ликовних Умјетности Универзитета Црне Горе; Fakultet Likovnih Umjetnosti Univerziteta Crne Gore
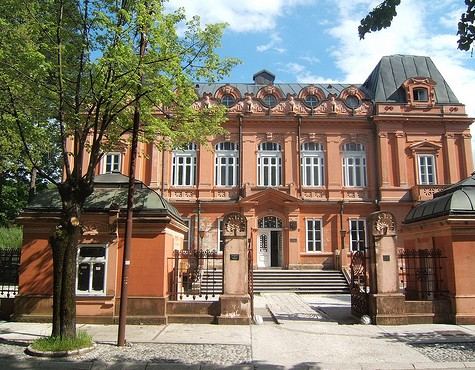
- Type: Public
- Established: 1988
- Affiliations: University of Montenegro
- Dean: Milena Jovićević
- Location: Cetinje, Montenegro; 42.388084°N 18.928047°E
- Campus: Urban
- Website: www.flu.ac.me

The University of Montenegro Faculty of Fine Arts (Montenegrin: Факултет Ликовних Умјетности Универзитета Црне Горе, Fakultet Likovnih Umjetnosti Univerziteta Crne Gore) is one of the educational institutions of the University of Montenegro. The Faculty is located in Cetinje, in the building of the former Russian embassy to Montenegro.

== History ==
Fine art education in Cetinje began with the establishment of the Secondary Art School in 1947. On May 18, 1988, the Faculty of Fine Arts was officially founded. The Faculty is located in the building of the former Russian Embassy which was designed by an Italian architect and is protected under the Historical Monuments Act.

== Organization ==
The Faculty of Fine Arts represents a modern artistic and educational institution that organizes work at academic undergraduate, specialist and master studies within the following study programs:

- Painting
- Sculpture
- Graphics
- Graphic Design

== Center 42° ==
The Art Exploration Center 42° of the Faculty of Fine Arts was established in 2010. Its aim is to promote contemporary art and its production. Within the Center, there's a library (encompassing the learning material of the Faculty of Fine Arts and the Faculty of Drama), a gallery and 2 apartments offering accommodation for the visiting professors.
