= University of Montenegro Faculty of Civil Engineering =

University in Podgorica, Montenegro

- Građevinski fakultet Univerziteta Crne Gore
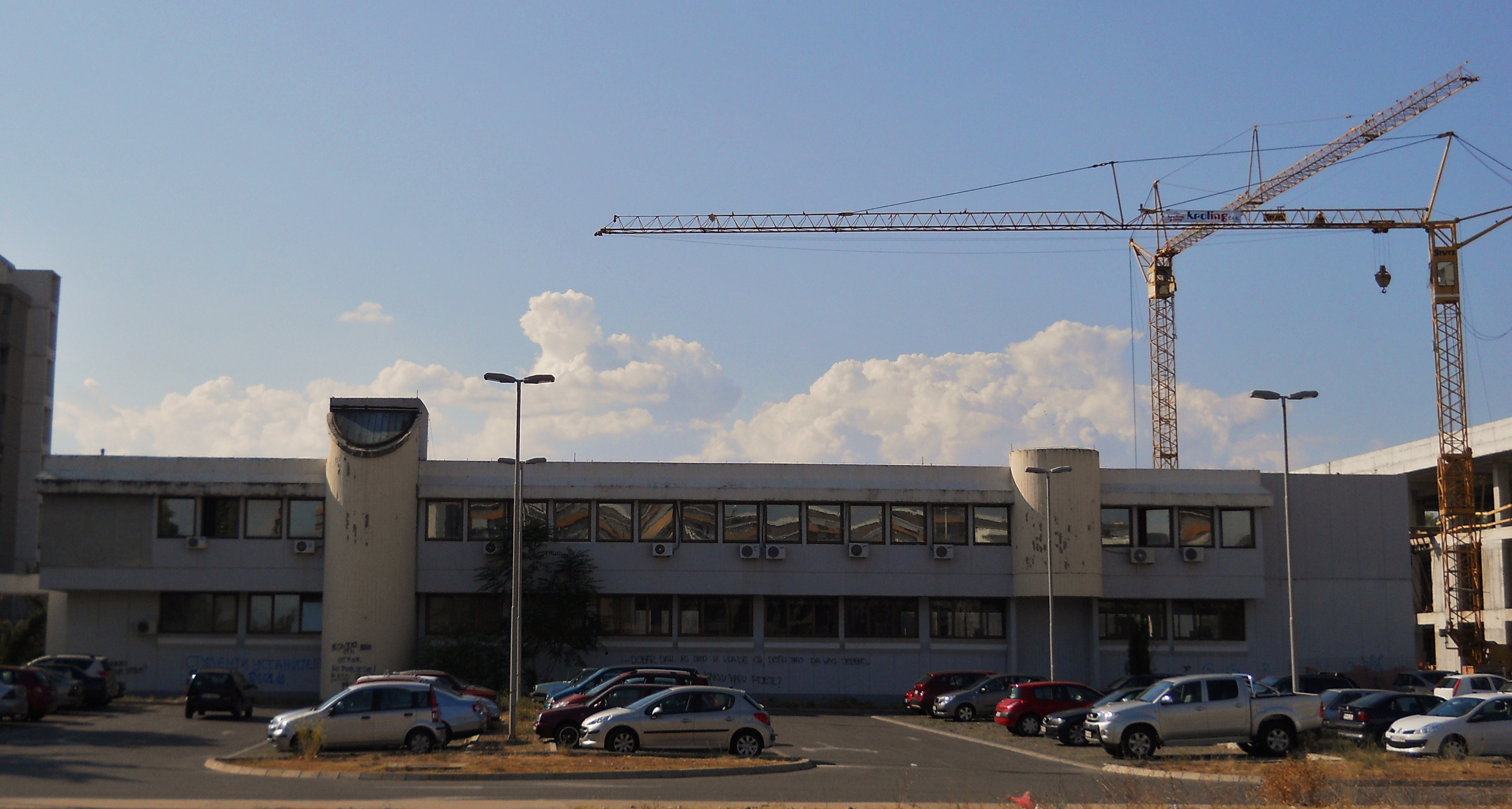
- Type: Public
- Established: 1980
- Affiliations: University of Montenegro
- Dean: Dr Marina Rakocevic
- Location: Podgorica, Montenegro; 42.443609°N 19.240938°E
- Campus: Urban
- Website: www.gf.ac.me

The University of Montenegro Faculty of Civil Engineering (Montenegrin: Građevinski fakultet Univerziteta Crne Gore Грађевински факултет Универзитета Црне Горе) is one of the educational institutions of the University of Montenegro. Its building is located in Podgorica, at the university campus.

== History ==
The Faculty grew out of the Faculty of Electrical Engineering. Due to the growing need for educated civil engineering workers in Montenegro, especially after the 1979 earthquake that struck the country, the Faculty of Civil Engineering was officially established on July 2, 1980, as part of the "Veljko Vlahović" University (today's University of Montenegro).

== Organization ==
=== Undergraduate studies ===
Undergraduate academic studies are organized at the Civil Engineering course of studies, while undergraduate applied studies are organized at the Management in Civil Engineering course.

=== Postgraduate specialist studies and master studies ===
Postgraduate specialist and master studies are organized at the following courses of studies at the Faculty:

- Construction
- Hydro-technics
- Transport
- Engineering and Spatial Planning
- Construction Management and Technology

=== Doctoral studies ===
Doctoral studies are organized at the following courses of studies:

- Constructions
- Hydro-technics
- Traffic and Spatial Planning Area
- Management in Civil Engineering
