= Mileva Filipović =

Montenegrin feminist sociologist

- Born: September 4, 1938; Spuž, Yugoslavia
- Died: July 11, 2020 (aged 81); Podgorica, Montenegro
- Burial place: Dobrska Župa
- Occupation: Sociologist
- Known for: Establishing women's studies in Montenegro

Academic background
- Education: University of Belgrade; École normale supérieure (Paris)
- Thesis: (1983)
- Academic advisor: Louis Althusser

Academic work
- Institutions: University of Montenegro

Mileva Jovanova Filipović (née Kalezyc, Cyrillic: Милева Филиповић; 4 September 1938 – 11 July 2020) was a Montenegrin sociologist, who was Professor of Law at the University of Montenegro, where she unsuccessfully tried to establish a Department of Gender Studies.

== Biography ==
Mileva Kalezyc was born on 4 September 1938 in Spuž. She graduated from the Sociology Department of the University of Belgrade in 1973, and subsequently received her MA in 1976. In 1983 she was awarded her PhD from the École normale supérieure, where she was supervised in part by Louis Althusser. From 1974 she worked at the University of Montenegro (then the University of Titograd) as an associate professor. In 1998 she was promoted to full professor at the Faculty of Law of the University of Montenegro, where she worked until her retirement in 2004. She tried unsuccessfully to establish a Women's Studies program at the university. She died on 11 July 2020 in Podgorica, and was buried in the cemetery in Dobrska Župa (pl).

== Research ==
Filipović worked on sociological, structuralist and epistemological research. Her interest in Gender Studies and feminism accelerated around 2000. She is credited with introducing the concept of gender into the Montenegrin academic discourse. She was described as an "outstanding" theoretical sociologist in Social Science in Southeastern Europe. During the 2000s she was the only researcher exploring the roles of women on post-socialist Montenegro, where she demonstrated that the 1990s were a period where women's rights were further eroded in the country.

== Selected works ==
- Filipović, Mileva. "Sociologija i postpozitivističke paradigme: neke saznajne teškoće savremene sociologije." Sociologija 50.3 (2008): 251–266.
- Filipović, Mileva. "Moška dominacija Pierra Bourdieuja." Ars & Humanitas 2.1 (2008): 121–132.
- Filipović, Mileva. "Paradigma za konstrukciju nacionalnih identiteta." Sociologija 43.4 (2001): 309–318.

== Personal life ==
Filipović had three sons: Vladimir, Nebojša and Slobodan.
