= Faculty of Philosophy, University of Montenegro =

University of Montenegro Faculty of Philosophy
- Filozofski fakultet Univerziteta Crne Gore
- Type: Public
- Established: 1963
- Affiliations: University of Montenegro
- Dean: Blagoje Cerović
- Location: Nikšić, Montenegro; 42.774298°N 18.954773°E
- Campus: Urban
- Website: www.ff.ac.me

The University of Montenegro Faculty of Philosophy (Montenegrin: Filozofski fakultet Univerziteta Crne Gore Филозофски факултет Универзитета Црне Горе) is one of the educational institutions of the University of Montenegro. The building is located in Nikšić, close to the city center.

== History ==
The Faculty's history can be traced back to 1947, when the Pedagogical College (Montenegrin: Viša pedagoška škola Виша педагошка школа) was founded in Cetinje. The College was moved to Nikšić in 1963, and renamed the Pedagogical Academy (Pedagoška akademija Педагошка академија). Between 1977 and 1988, the school was called the Teaching Faculty (Nastavnički fakultet Наставнички факултет).

Since 1988, the Faculty is known by its current name. It officially became part of the University of Montenegro on April 29, 1974, when the Agreement on Association into the University of Titograd (today's University of Montenegro) was signed with the representatives of the Faculty of Law, the Faculty of Engineering, the Faculty of Economics, the Maritime Studies College from Kotor and three independent scientific institutes from Titograd.

== Organization ==
The Faculty of Philosophy is a complex educational and scientific institution which organizes undergraduate, specialist and postgraduate studies as well as doctoral studies within its main activities.

=== Undergraduate studies ===
Undergraduate studies are organized on the following 8 departments of the Faculty of Philosophy:

- Sociology
- Philosophy
- History
- Geography
- Pedagogy
- Teacher education
- Preschool education
- Psychology

=== Specialist studies ===
Postgraduate specialist studies are organized on the following departments:

- Sociology
- History
- Geography
- Pedagogy
- Preschool education
- Psychology

=== Master studies ===
Master studies are organized at the following courses of studies:

- Sociology
- Philosophy
- History
- Geography
- Pedagogy
- Teacher education
- Psychology

=== Doctoral studies ===
Doctoral studies are organized on departments of the Faculty:

- Sociology
- Philosophy
- History
- Geography
