= Faculty of Economics Podgorica =

University of Montenegro department

- Ekonomski fakultet Univerzitet Crne Gore
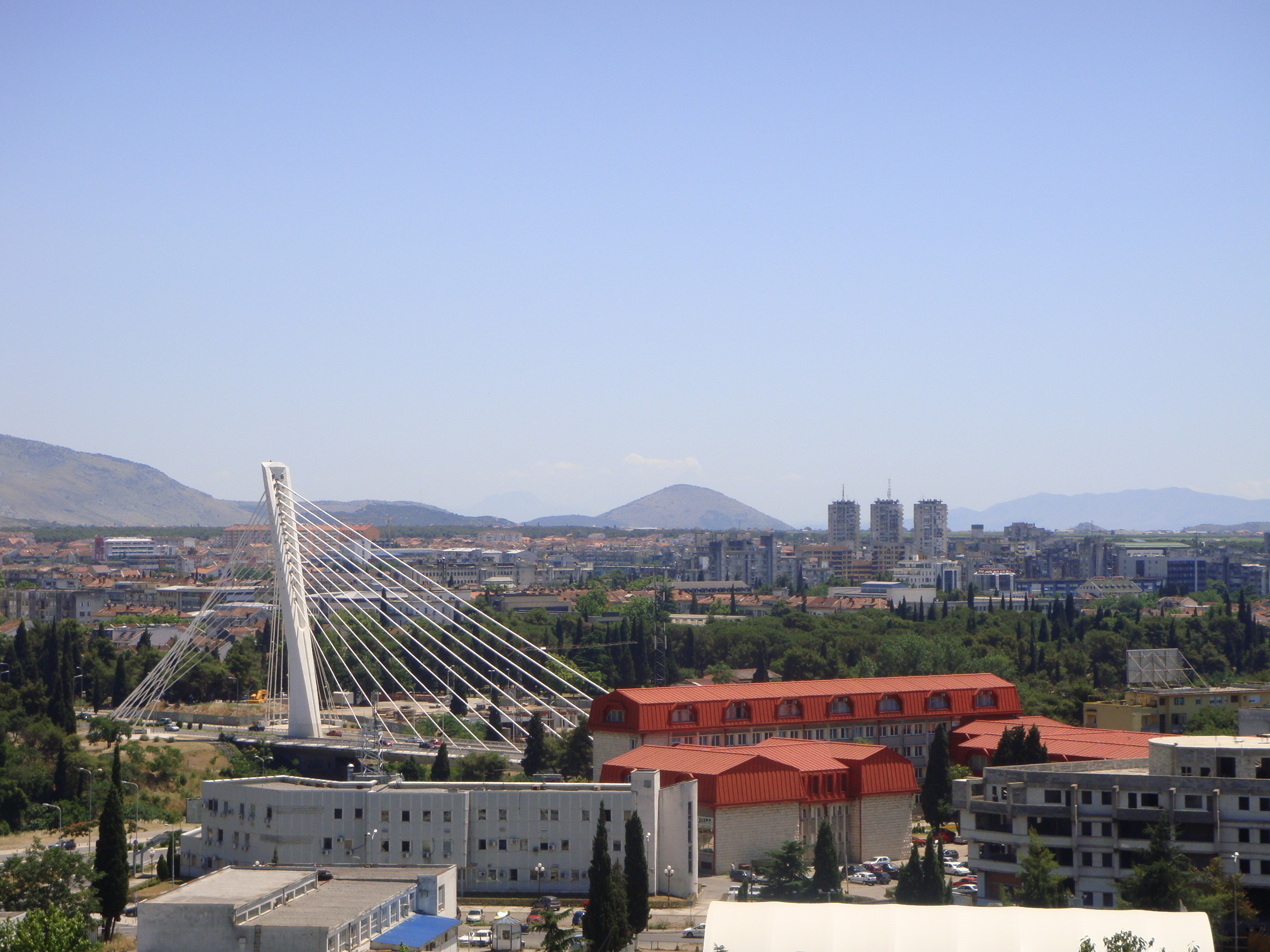
- Faculty of Economics (red building)
- Type: Public
- Established: 1960
- Parent institution: University of Montenegro
- Academic affiliations: University of Montenegro
- Provost: Đurđica Perović, Irena Orović
- Rector: Danilo Nikolić
- Dean: Mijat Jocović
- Director: Zdenka Dragašević
- Administrative staff: 47 professors
- Students: 6000
- Location: Jovana Tomaševića 37, Podgorica, 81000, Montenegro; 42.44615°N 19.257037°E
- Campus: Urban
- Colours: Blue and white
- Website: www.ekonomija.ac.me

The University of Montenegro Faculty of Economics (Montenegrin: Ekonomski fakultet Univerziteta Crne Gore Економски факултет Универзитета Црне Горе) is one of the educational institutions of the University of Montenegro. The building is located in Podgorica, next to the Faculty of Law and the Faculty of Political Sciences building. The Podgorica School of Economics is Montenegro's leading educational institution in business end economics.

== History ==
The Faculty of Economics was founded in 1960, and is the oldest institution of higher education in Montenegro. It was a part of the University of Belgrade until April 29, 1974, when the Agreement on Association into the University of Titograd (today's University of Montenegro) was signed with the representatives of the Faculty of Law, the Faculty of Engineering, the Teaching College from Nikšić, the Maritime Studies College from Kotor and three independent scientific institutes from Titograd.

== Degree programs ==
=== Undergraduate program ===
The curriculum of undergraduate studies at the Faculty comprises eight courses:

- Entrepreneurship and Business
- Finances
- Management
- International Business
- Marketing
- Quantitative Methods in Economics and economics
- Information Systems
- Economy of Public Administration

=== Postgraduate programs ===
The curriculum of postgraduate studies at the Faculty comprises only one course: Entrepreneurial Economy.

== Alumni ==
Some of the school's renowned students and professors include:

- Igor Lukšić, PhD - current Prime Minister of Montenegro
- Milo Đukanović - former Prime Minister and President of Montenegro
- Momir Bulatović - former President of Montenegro and Prime Minister of the Federal Republic of Yugoslavia
- Gordana Đurović, PhD - former Minister of European Integrations of Montenegro
- Vujica Lazović - Minister of Information Society and Telecommunications of Montenegro
- Predrag Sekulić - current Minister of Sustainable Development and Tourism of Montenegro
- Milorad Katnić, PhD - current Minister of Finance of Montenegro
