= University of Montenegro =

University in Podgorica, Montenegro

- Univerzitet Crne Gore
- Type: Public
- Established: 29 April 1974; 52 years ago
- Rector: Prof. Vladimir Božović PhD
- Academic staff: 850 (regular)
- Students: 21,595
- Location: Podgorica, Montenegro; 42°26′35″N 19°14′35″E
- Campus: Urban
- Colors: Blue and white
- Website: www.ucg.ac.me

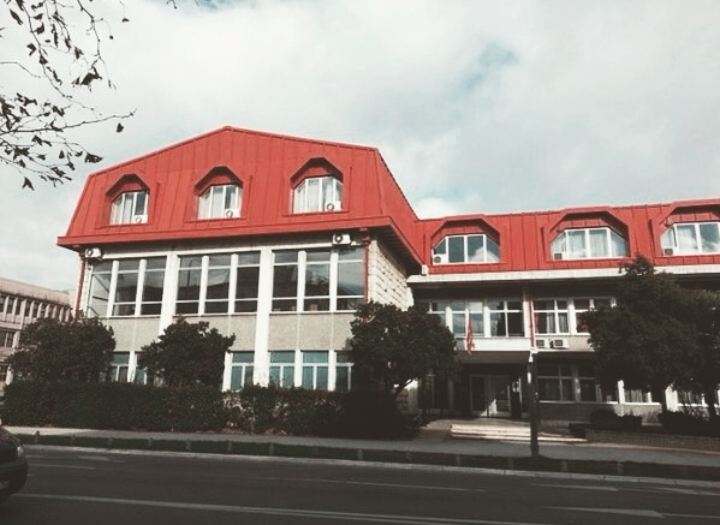
Faculty of Law, Podgorica

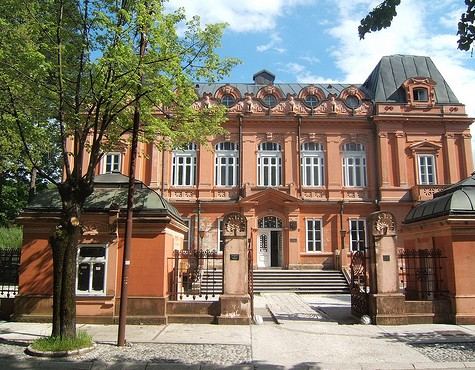
Faculty of Fine Arts, Cetinje

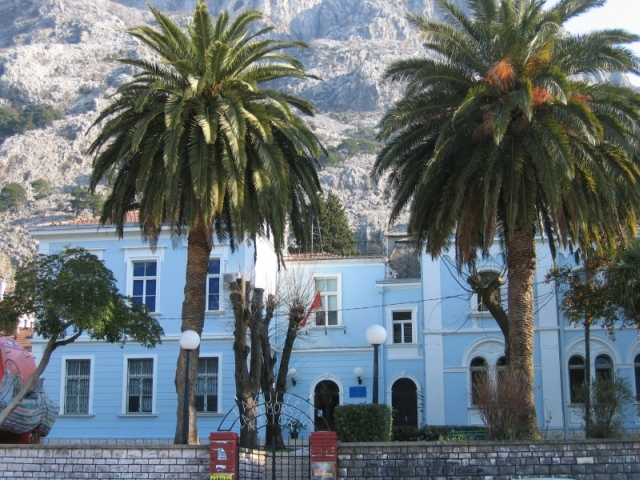
Faculty of Marine Studies, Kotor

The University of Montenegro (Montenegrin: Univerzitet Crne Gore / Универзитет Црнe Горe) is a national public university of Montenegro.

Its central administration and most of its constituent faculties are located in the country's capital Podgorica, with campuses in Nikšić, Cetinje, and Kotor. Its institution was established in 1974 and currently has 19 faculties.

== History ==
The University of Montenegro was founded on 29 April 1974 in Titograd, SR Montenegro (now Podgorica). In that year the following organisations signed the Agreement on Association into the University of Titograd:

- three faculties: Faculty of Economics, Faculty of Engineering, and Faculty of Law (Podgorica),
- two colleges: Teaching College (Nikšić) and Maritime Studies College (Kotor), and
- three independent scientific institutes: for History, for Agriculture, and for Biological & Medical Research (Podgorica).

A year after its foundation, the institution changed its name to Veljko Vlahović University in honour of the communist activist and World War II participant from Montenegro who died that year. The 1970s was a decade of exponential rise in number of higher education institutions in Yugoslavia, when alongside Podgorica, universities in Osijek, Rijeka, Split, Banja Luka, Mostar, Maribor, Bitola, Kragujevac, and Tuzla all opened their doors. In 1992 the university was given its current name - University of Montenegro.

== Organization ==
The seat of the university is in Podgorica, the capital of Montenegro, with a population of around 290,000. Most faculties of the University of Montenegro are located in Podgorica, while some faculties are in Nikšić, Cetinje and Kotor.

The university comprises faculties, institutes and colleges, as well as logistic centers. The Managing Board governs the university and the Rector manages it. The supreme academic body is the University Senate. Deans are heads of faculties and directors are heads of institutes. At faculties i.e. at institutes, the highest academic bodies are councils for teaching-scientific issues, i.e. for teaching-artistic issues.

The highest student body is the Student Parliament. Representatives of students are elected in all bodies of the university and of the faculties.

=== Faculties ===
The university has 19 faculties in four cities:

- Podgorica

- Faculty of Architecture
- Faculty of Biotechnology
- Faculty of Civil Engineering
- Faculty of Economics
- Faculty of Electrical Engineering
- Faculty of Law
- Faculty of Mechanical Engineering
- Faculty of Medicine
- Faculty of Metallurgy and Technology
- Faculty of Natural Sciences and Mathematics
- Faculty of Political Sciences

- Nikšić

- Faculty of Philosophy
- Faculty of Philology
- Faculty for Sport and Physical Education

- Cetinje

- Faculty of Drama
- Faculty of Fine Arts
- Music Academy

- Kotor

- Faculty of Maritime Studies
- Faculty of Tourism and Hotel Management

Within the faculties, there are departments and study groups.

The university has four scientific research institutes:

- Institute for History
- Institute - Center of Excellence in Research and Innovation
- Institute for Advanced Studies
- Institute of Marine Biology

As a part of the Institute of Marine Biology, the Adriatic Biodiversity Conservation Center ″Aquarium Boka″ was established in 2020. It is the first and only public aquarium in Montenegro. It is also a unique institution in Montenegro that combines research and education to promote and practice the efficient conservation of marine wildlife.

== Teaching and learning ==
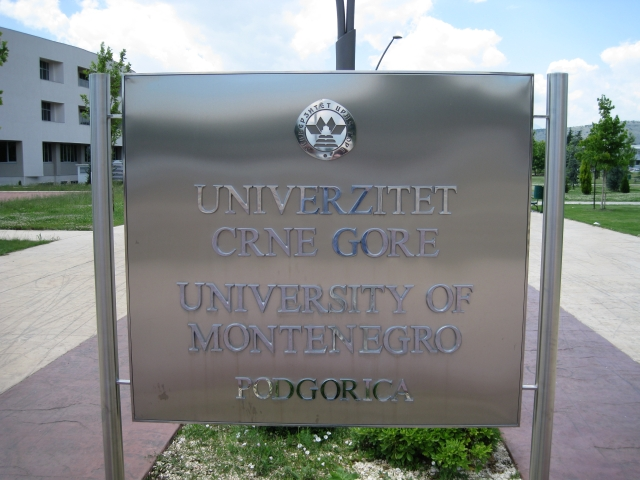
Former logo sign of the University of Montenegro, used until 2016.

In 2017 the University of Montenegro reformed the system of studies and adopted the new 3+2+3 system, instead of the previous 3+1+1+3. In 2017, 160 study programmes have been accredited at all study levels, of which 114 are at bachelor and postgraduate studies, 14 applied studies, and 25 doctoral programmes. Also, eight interdisciplinary study programmes are accredited, of which one is at the doctoral level and seven at the masters level. All bachelor study programmes are accredited as three-year study programmes (180 ECTS points), while having, at the most, two modules in their VI semester. They are organized as either academic or applied studies. Exempted from this rule are the regulated professions, which have implemented the EU directives about the duration of their bachelor studies, so that bachelor studies in medicine and dentistry last 6 years, while pharmacology and architecture last five years.

The postgraduate study programmes are organized after the completion of the bachelor studies and all are accredited as two-year programmes. The scope of the postgraduate studies is 120 ECTS points.

Doctoral studies are organized after postgraduate studies, and all of them are accredited as three-year study programmes. The scope of doctoral studies is 180 ECTS points.

== Notable faculty ==
- Mileva Filipović – sociologist and gender studies pioneer (1938–2020)

== See also ==
- List of colleges and universities
- List of universities in Montenegro
