= Outline of Montenegro =

Overview of and topical guide to Montenegro

The Flag of Montenegro

The Coat of arms of Montenegro

Location of Montenegro (Green) in Europe (Dark Grey) – [Legend]

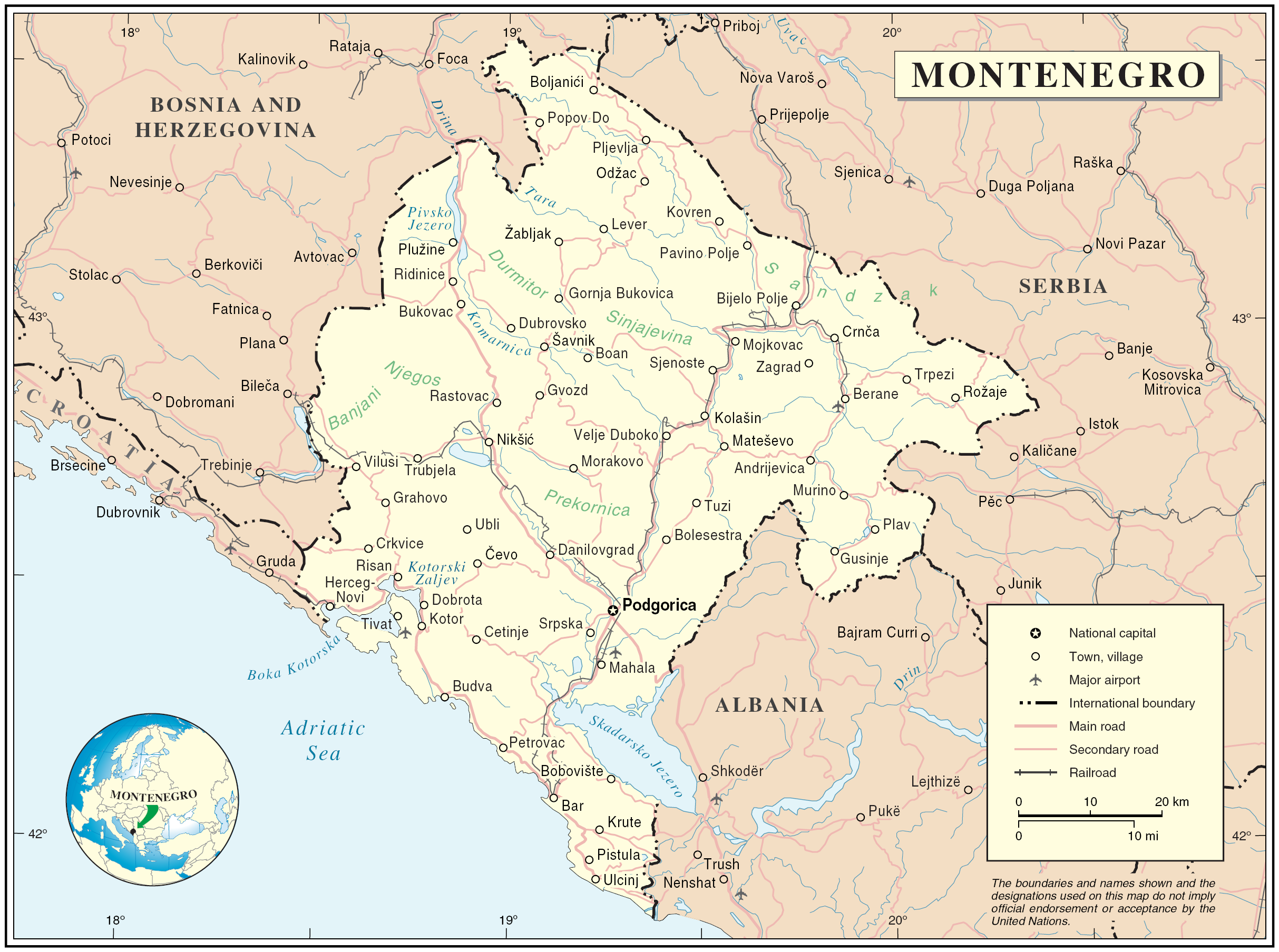
An enlargeable map of Montenegro.

The following outline is provided as an overview of and topical guide to Montenegro:

Montenegro – sovereign country located on the Balkan Peninsula in Southern Europe. It has a coast on the Adriatic Sea to the south and borders Croatia to the west, Bosnia and Herzegovina to the northwest, Serbia and Kosovo to the northeast, Albania to the southeast. Its capital and largest city is Podgorica, while Cetinje is designated as the Prijestonica (meaning the old royal capital or former seat of the throne).

The thousand-year history of the Montenegrin state begins in the 9th century with the emergence of Duklja, a vassal state of Byzantium. In those formative years, Duklja was ruled by the Vojislavljevic dynasty. In 1042,at the end of his 25-year rule, King Vojislav won a decisive battle near Bar against Byzantium, and Duklja became independent. Duklja's power and prosperity reached their zenith under King Vojislav's son, King Mihailo (1046–81), and his son King Bodin (1081–1101). From the 11th century, it started to be referred to as Zeta. It ended with its incorporation into Serbia in the late 1180s. Beginning with the Crnojević dynasty (late 15th century), Upper Zeta was more often referred to as Crna Gora or by the Venetian term monte negro. A sovereign principality since the Late Middle Ages, Montenegro saw its independence from the Ottoman Empire formally recognized in 1878. From 1918, it was a part of various incarnations of Yugoslavia. On the basis of a referendum held on 21 May 2006, Montenegro declared independence on 3 June. On 28 June 2006, it became the 192nd member state of the United Nations; on 11 May 2007 the 47th member state of the Council of Europe; and on 5 June 2017, the 29th member of NATO. On 15 December 2008, Montenegro presented its official application to the European Union and received the status of a candidate on 17 December 2010. For years, Montenegro has been a leading candidate for membership in the European Union, with potential membership in 2028 at the earliest.

== General reference ==
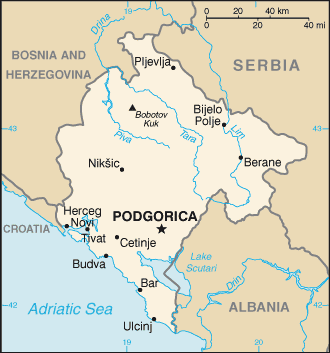
An enlargeable basic map of Montenegro.

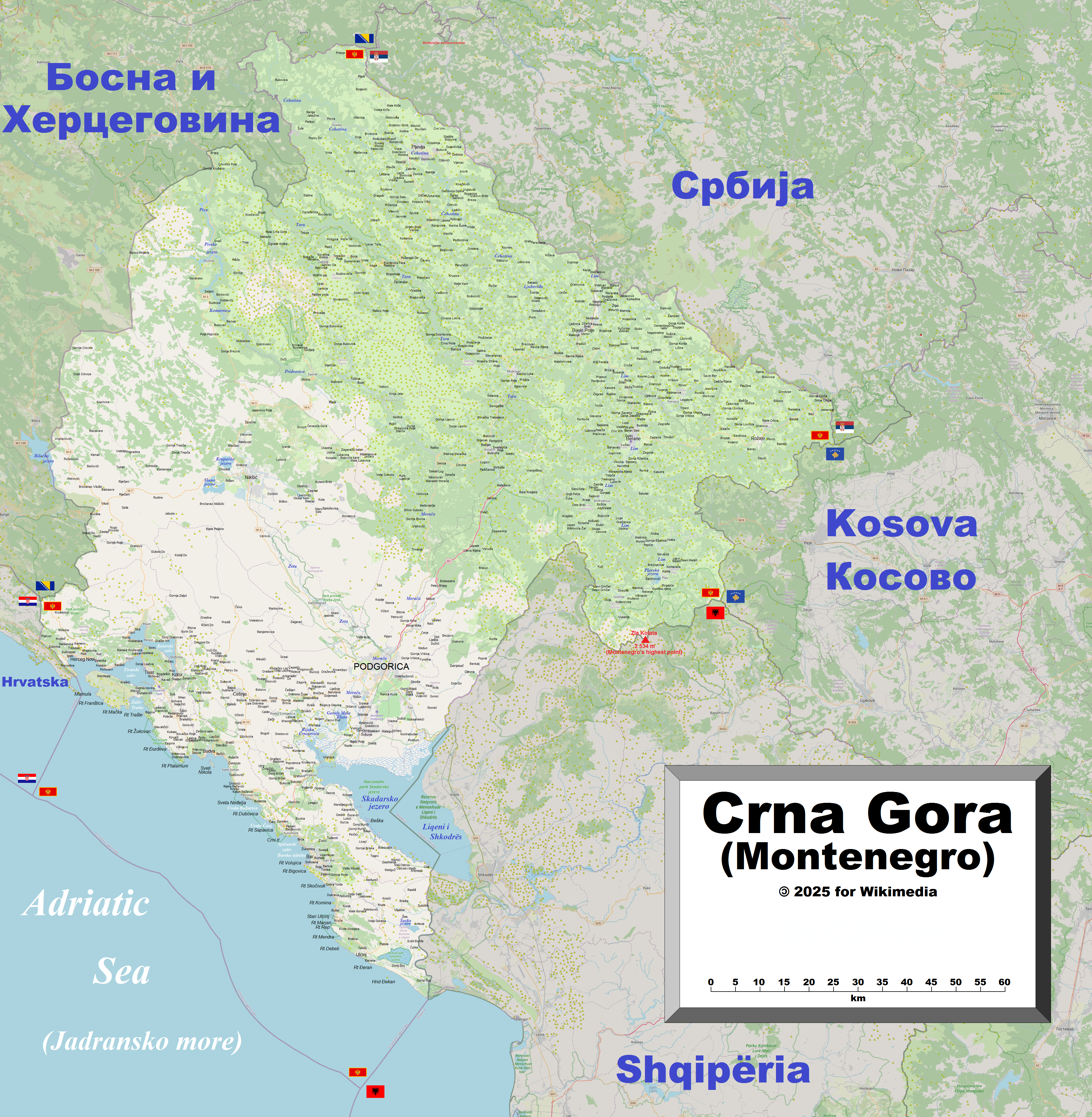
An enlargeable detailed map of Montenegro.

- Pronunciation:
- Common English country name: Montenegro
- Official English country name: Montenegro
- Common endonym(s): Crna Gora – Црна Гора
- Official endonym(s): Crna Gora – Црна Гора
- Adjectival(s): Montenegrin
- Demonym(s):
- Etymology: Name of Montenegro
- International rankings of Montenegro
- ISO country codes: ME, MNE, 499
- ISO region codes: See ISO 3166-2:ME
- Internet country code top-level domain: .me

== Geography of Montenegro ==
Geography of Montenegro

- Montenegro is: a country
- Location:
  - Eastern Hemisphere
  - Northern Hemisphere
    - Eurasia
      - Europe
        - Southern Europe
          - Balkans (also known as "Southeastern Europe")
  - Time zone: Central European Time (UTC+01), Central European Summer Time (UTC+02)
  - Extreme points of Montenegro
    - High: Zla Kolata 2,534 m (8,314 ft)
    - Low: Adriatic Sea 0 m
  - Land boundaries: 625 km

Bosnia and Herzegovina 225 km
Albania 172 km
Serbia 203 km
Croatia 25 km

- Coastline: Adriatic Sea 293.5 km

- Population of Montenegro: 623,633 – 171st most populous country in the world
- Area of Montenegro: 13,812 km^{2}
- Atlas of Montenegro

=== Environment of Montenegro ===
- Climate of Montenegro
- Renewable energy in Montenegro
- Geology of Montenegro
- Protected areas of Montenegro
  - Biosphere reserves in Montenegro
  - National parks of Montenegro
- Wildlife of Montenegro
  - Fauna of Montenegro
    - Birds of Montenegro
    - Mammals of Montenegro

==== Natural geographic features of Montenegro ====
- Glaciers of Montenegro
- Islands of Montenegro
- Lakes of Montenegro
- Mountains of Montenegro
- Rivers of Montenegro
- World Heritage Sites in Montenegro

=== Regions of Montenegro ===
Regions of Montenegro

==== Ecoregions of Montenegro ====
- List of ecoregions in Montenegro

==== Administrative divisions of Montenegro ====
Administrative divisions of Montenegro

- Municipalities of Montenegro

===== Municipalities of Montenegro =====
Municipalities of Montenegro

- Capital of Montenegro: Podgorica
- Cities of Montenegro

=== Demography of Montenegro ===
Demographics of Montenegro

== Government and politics of Montenegro ==
Politics of Montenegro

- Form of government:
- Capital of Montenegro: Podgorica
- Elections in Montenegro
- Political parties in Montenegro

=== Branches of the government of Montenegro ===
Government of Montenegro

==== Executive branch of the government of Montenegro ====
- Head of state: President of Montenegro, Jakov Milatovic
- Head of government: Prime Minister of Montenegro, Milojko Spajic
- Cabinet of Montenegro

==== Legislative branch of the government of Montenegro ====
- Parliament of Montenegro (unicameral)

==== Judicial branch of the government of Montenegro ====
Court system of Montenegro

- Supreme Court of Montenegro

=== Foreign relations of Montenegro ===
Foreign relations of Montenegro

- Diplomatic missions in Montenegro
- Diplomatic missions of Montenegro
- Montenegro–Serbia relations
- Bosnia and Herzegovina–Montenegro relations
- Albania–Montenegro relations
- Croatia–Montenegro relations
- Italy–Montenegro relations
- Montenegro–Russia relations
- Montenegro–United States relations
- Montenegro–Ukraine relations
- Montenegro–Palestine relations
- Germany–Montenegro relations
- Montenegro–United Kingdom relations
- Montenegro–Turkey relations
- Montenegro–Spain relations
- Montenegro–North Macedonia relations
- Montenegro–Slovenia relations
- Montenegro-Finland relations

==== International organization membership ====
Montenegro is a member of:

- Central European Initiative (CEI)
- Council of Europe (CE)
- Euro-Atlantic Partnership Council (EAPC)
- European Bank for Reconstruction and Development (EBRD)
- Food and Agriculture Organization (FAO)
- International Atomic Energy Agency (IAEA)
- International Bank for Reconstruction and Development (IBRD)
- International Civil Aviation Organization (ICAO)
- International Criminal Court (ICCt)
- International Criminal Police Organization (Interpol)
- International Development Association (IDA)
- International Federation of Red Cross and Red Crescent Societies (IFRCS)
- International Finance Corporation (IFC)
- International Labour Organization (ILO)
- International Maritime Organization (IMO)
- International Mobile Satellite Organization (IMSO)
- International Monetary Fund (IMF)
- International Olympic Committee (IOC)
- International Organization for Migration (IOM)
- International Organization for Standardization (ISO) (correspondent)
- International Red Cross and Red Crescent Movement (ICRM)
- International Telecommunication Union (ITU)
- North Atlantic Treaty Organization (NATO)
- International Trade Union Confederation (ITUC)
- Inter-Parliamentary Union (IPU)
- Multilateral Investment Guarantee Agency (MIGA)
- Organization for Security and Cooperation in Europe (OSCE)
- Organisation for the Prohibition of Chemical Weapons (OPCW)
- Partnership for Peace (PFP)
- Permanent Court of Arbitration (PCA)
- Southeast European Cooperative Initiative (SECI)
- United Nations (UN)
- United Nations Educational, Scientific, and Cultural Organization (UNESCO)
- United Nations High Commissioner for Refugees (UNHCR)
- United Nations Industrial Development Organization (UNIDO)
- United Nations Mission in Liberia (UNMIL)
- Universal Postal Union (UPU)
- World Customs Organization (WCO)
- World Federation of Trade Unions (WFTU)
- World Health Organization (WHO)
- World Intellectual Property Organization (WIPO)
- World Meteorological Organization (WMO)
- World Tourism Organization (UNWTO)
- World Trade Organization (WTO) (observer)

=== Law and order in Montenegro ===
Law of Montenegro

- Constitution of Montenegro
- Crime in Montenegro
- Human rights in Montenegro
  - LGBT rights in Montenegro
  - Freedom of religion in Montenegro
- Law enforcement in Montenegro

=== Military of Montenegro ===
Military of Montenegro

- Command
  - Commander-in-chief:
    - Ministry of Defence of Montenegro
- Forces
  - Army of Montenegro
  - Navy of Montenegro
  - Air Force of Montenegro
  - Special forces of Montenegro
- Military history of Montenegro
- Military ranks of Montenegro

=== Local government in Montenegro ===
Local government in Montenegro

== History of Montenegro ==
History of Montenegro

- Timeline of the history of Montenegro
- Current events of Montenegro
- Military history of Montenegro

== Culture of Montenegro ==
Culture of Montenegro

- Architecture of Montenegro
- Cuisine of Montenegro
- Festivals in Montenegro
- Languages of Montenegro
- Media in Montenegro
- National symbols of Montenegro
  - Coat of arms of Montenegro
  - Flag of Montenegro
  - National anthem of Montenegro
- People of Montenegro
- Public holidays in Montenegro
- Records of Montenegro
- Religion in Montenegro
  - Christianity in Montenegro
  - Hinduism in Montenegro
  - Islam in Montenegro
  - Judaism in Montenegro
  - Sikhism in Montenegro
- World Heritage Sites in Montenegro

=== Art in Montenegro ===
- Art in Montenegro
- Cinema of Montenegro
- Literature of Montenegro
- Music of Montenegro
- Television in Montenegro
- Theatre in Montenegro

=== Sports in Montenegro ===
Sports in Montenegro

- Football in Montenegro
- Montenegro at the Olympics

== Economy and infrastructure of Montenegro ==
Economy of Montenegro

- Economic rank, by nominal GDP (2007): 149th (one hundred and forty ninth)
- Agriculture in Montenegro
- Banking in Montenegro
  - National Bank of Montenegro
- Communications in Montenegro
  - Internet in Montenegro
- Companies of Montenegro
- Currency of Montenegro: Euro (see also: Euro topics)
  - ISO 4217: EUR
- Energy in Montenegro
  - Energy policy of Montenegro
  - Oil industry in Montenegro
- Health in Montenegro
- Mining in Montenegro
- Montenegro Stock Exchange
- Tourism in Montenegro
- Transport in Montenegro
  - Airports in Montenegro
  - Rail transport in Montenegro
  - Roads in Montenegro
- Water supply and sanitation in Montenegro

== Education in Montenegro ==
Education in Montenegro

== See also ==
Montenegro

- Index of Montenegro-related articles
- List of international rankings
- List of Montenegro-related topics
- Member state of the United Nations
- Montenegrin language
- Outline of Europe
- Outline of geography
