= Geographical regions in Serbia and Montenegro =

Serbia and Montenegro are now separate independent countries following the dissolution of the State Union of Serbia and Montenegro. For a list of regions in those two countries, see:

- Geographical regions in Serbia
- Geographical regions in Montenegro
