= Economy of Serbia and Montenegro =

As the economy of the Socialist Federal Republic of Yugoslavia collapsed and entered a prolonged decline in 1989, the country broke up into five new sovereign states by 1992, independence of which was fought over in a series of Yugoslav Wars. The rump state that continued to designate itself as 'Yugoslavia' (Federal Republic of) was established as a confederation of two of these successor states, Serbia and Montenegro.

With hyperinflation exacerbated by the economic sanctions imposed during the Bosnian War, the Federal Republic of Yugoslavia (FRY) economy's downward spiral showed no real sign of recovery until 1995. GDP was nowhere near its 1990 level, but the 1999 NATO bombing of Yugoslavia of the basic infrastructure of the country and many factories, as well as a renewed embargo, caused a further huge drop in GDP in relation to the 1991 level. The first sign of an economic recovery occurred in 2001 after the overthrow of Slobodan Milošević, which occurred on 5 October 2000. A vigorous team of economic reformers worked to tame inflation (non-energy inflation is less than 9% in 2002, down from over 120% two years earlier) and rationalize the Serbian and Montenegrin economy. By January 2005, GDP recovered to 55-60% of its 1990 level, due to GDP growth of 8.5% in 2004.

Following the 2006 Montenegrin independence referendum, the union dissolved as Montenegro became an independent country. Thereafter, the economy of Montenegro and economy of Serbia would follow different trajectories.

== Hyperinflation ==
The FRY's monetary unit, the Yugoslav dinar in Serbia and Montenegro, remained volatile throughout Milošević's rule. Alarmed FRY officials took several steps to tighten monetary policy in 1998, including ruling out a devaluation in the near term, increasing reserve requirements, and issuing bonds. During this period, Montenegro rejected the dinar and adopted the Deutsche Mark (now replaced by the euro) as its official currency. As 1999 began, the damage control operation had succeeded in returning the exchange rate to reasonable levels. However, it was not until 2002, after intense macroeconomic reform measures, that the dinar became convertible—a first since the Bretton Woods Agreements laid out the post-World War II international exchange rate regime.

== Stabilization efforts ==
Privatization efforts have not succeeded as well as macroeconomic reform. The process of privatization was not popular among workers of large socially owned companies, and many citizens appeared to believe the tendering process was overly centralized and controlled from Belgrade. Furthermore, international investment was lagging in Serbia and Montenegro, as a result of both domestic and international investment climates. Managers tended to blame the dearth of interest on the current negative business climate in Serbia and Montenegro.

== Statistics ==
=== Gross Domestic Product ===
Purchasing power parity - $25.98 billion (2004 est.)<, $27.5 Billion predicted for 2005 br> Real growth rate: 8.5% (2004 est.), 6.5% (2005 est)
Real GDP Per capita - nominal: $2900 (2004 est.), $3200 (2005 est.)
Composition by sector:

Agriculture: 15.2%
Industry: 28.2%
Services: 56.6% (2004 est.)

=== Economic Situation ===
Population below poverty line: 10%
Inflation rate (consumer prices): 12-13% (2004 est.)
Labor force: 3,596,282 (2005 est.)
Budget:

Revenues: $9.773 billion
expenditures: $10.460 billion (2004 est.)

=== Industrial Situation ===
Industries:

machine building (aircraft, trucks, and automobiles; tanks and weapons; electrical equipment; agricultural machinery); metallurgy (steel, aluminum, copper, lead, zinc, chromium, antimony, bismuth, cadmium); mining (coal, bauxite, nonferrous ore, iron ore, limestone); consumer goods (textiles, footwear, foodstuffs, appliances); electronics, petroleum products, chemicals, and pharmaceuticals

Industrial production growth rate: 6.5% (2004 est.)

=== Electricity ===
In 2023, electricity production was valued at $53.2 million.

Production: 31,710 GWh (2001)
Production by source (2001):

Fossil fuel: 62.9%
Hydro: 37.1%
Nuclear: 0%
Other: 0%

Consumption: 32,370 GWh (2001)
Exports: 446 GWh (2001)
Imports: 3,330 GWh (2001)

=== Oil ===
Production: 15,000-barrel (2,400 m^{3}) 2001
Consumption: 64,000-barrel (10,200 m^{3}) 2001
Exports: NA (2001)
Imports: NA (2001)
Proved reserves: 38.75-million-barrels (6,161,000 m^{3}) January 2002

=== Natural Gas ===
Proved reserves: 24.07 km^{3} (January 2002 est.)

=== Agricultural Produce ===
Cereals, fruits, vegetables, tobacco, olives; cattle, sheep, goats.

=== Exports ===
Total: $5.5 billion f.o.b. (2004 est.)(goods and services)
Commodities: manufactured goods, food and live animals, raw materials
Partners: Bosnia and Herzegovina 19%, Italy 12%, Germany 12%, Republic of Macedonia 8%, Russia 4% (2004)

=== Imports ===
Total: $11.5 billion f.o.b. (2004 est.)(goods and services)
Commodities: machinery and transport equipment, fuels and lubricants, manufactured goods, chemicals, food and live animals, raw materials
Partners: Russia 13%, Germany 13%, Italy 9%, China 5%, USA 4% (2004)

=== Debt ===
External: $12.6 billion (2004 est.)
-As a percentage of GDP: 55-60% (2004 est.)
Economic aid - recipient: $2 billion pledged in 2001 (disbursements to follow for several years)

=== Currency ===
Serbian dinar (CSD). Note - in Montenegro the euro is legal tender; in Kosovo both the euro and the Yugoslav dinar are legal (2002)
Code: YUM
Exchange rates: Serbian dinars per US dollar - official rate: 60 (2004); Fiscal year: calendar year

== See also ==
- Economy of Europe
- Economy of the Socialist Federal Republic of Yugoslavia
- Economy of Montenegro
- Economy of Serbia
- Central Bank of Montenegro
- National Bank of Serbia
