= International sanctions against Serbia and Montenegro =

International embargo imposed by the United Nations during the Yugoslav Wars

- Part of the Yugoslav Wars
- Date: 8 November 1991 – 1995; 30 May 1992 – 22 November 1995; March 1998 – October 2000
- Type: International sanctions
- Target: Serbia and Montenegro

During the Yugoslav Wars of the 1990s and early 2000s, several rounds of international sanctions were imposed against the former Yugoslav republics of Serbia and Montenegro that formed a new country called the Federal Republic of Yugoslavia. Sanctions enforced ban on all international trade, scientific and technical cooperation, sports and cultural exchanges, air and sea travel.

In the first round of sanctions, which were imposed in response to the Bosnian War and Croatian War, and lasted between April 1992 and October 1995, Yugoslavia was placed under a United Nations (UN) embargo. The embargo was lifted following the signing of the Dayton Agreement, which ended the conflict. During and after the Kosovo War of 1998–1999, Yugoslavia was again sanctioned by the UN, European Union (EU) (Note: European Union countries: France, Germany, Belgium, Netherlands, Luxembourg, Italy, United Kingdom, Ireland, Denmark, Greece, Spain, Portugal, Austria, Finland and Sweden.) and United States. Following the overthrow of Yugoslav President Slobodan Milošević in October 2000, the sanctions against Yugoslavia started to be withdrawn, and most were lifted by 19 January 2001.

The sanctions had a major impact on the economy of Serbia and Montenegro and its society, with Serbia the hardest hit, its GDP dropping from $24 billion in 1990 to below $10 billion in 1993, and $8.66 billion in 2000. They also had a significant impact on Yugoslav industry. Poverty was at its highest in 1993, with 39 percent of the population living on less than $2 per month. Poverty levels rose again when international sanctions were re-imposed in 1998. An estimated 800,000 people emigrated from Serbia in the 1990s, 20 percent of whom had a higher education.

== Background ==
In 1991, the breakup of Yugoslavia was in progress, with the westernmost republics of Slovenia and Croatia declaring independence, and in the second part of the year, the Croatian War of Independence was in full swing with the 1991 Yugoslav campaign in Croatia. On 25 September 1991, the United Nations Security Council Resolution 713 established an embargo on weapons and military equipment to Yugoslavia, which was intended to support the Conference on Yugoslavia, which was meant to resolve the situation peacefully and through negotiation.

On November 8, 1991, the European Economic Community imposed the first economic sanctions against former Yugoslav republics, while on December 2 it lifted sanctions and reinstated economic aid to all republics other than Serbia and Montenegro. The sanctions forbade the EEC's members from importing textiles from Yugoslavia and suspended an aggregate total of $1.9 billion in EEC aid packages which had been promised to Yugoslavia before twelve cease-fires failed to materialize in the Croatian war zone.

At the turn of 1992, the dissolution of SFR Yugoslavia was internationally recognized. The former Yugoslav republics of Serbia and Montenegro formed a new smaller state called the Federal Republic of Yugoslavia. By the end of spring 1992, the Bosnian War started in the Republic of Bosnia and Herzegovina.

== History ==
On May 30, 1992, the United Nations Security Council passed UN SCR 757 by a 13–0 vote. It banned all international trade, scientific and technical cooperation, sports and cultural exchanges, air and sea travel, and travel of government officials from the Federal Republic of Yugoslavia. On the following day, President George H. W. Bush of the United States ordered the Department of Treasury to seize all US-based assets of the Yugoslav government, worth approximately $200 million at the time. French President François Mitterrand initially delayed the passing of Resolution 757 when he proposed that the sports ban be removed, but instead opted to keep the sports ban in exchange for written clarification that Serbian combatants were not solely responsible for the War in Croatia. In spite of Mitterrand's amendment, Resolution 757 solely targeted the Federal Republic of Yugoslavia, not any of the breakaway states.

On November 16, 1992, the UNSC passed Resolution 787, imposing a widespread ban on shipments to and from Yugoslavia. This Resolution was followed by a series of naval blockades, beginning with Operation Maritime Guard and later involving Operation Sharp Guard. The UNSC passed over a hundred resolutions over the course of armed conflict in the former Yugoslavia, and some targeted Serbian entities outside of the Federal Republic of Yugoslavia. Resolutions 820 and 942 specifically prohibited import-export exchanges and froze assets of Republika Srpska, at the time an unrecognized Serb statelet established by the war in Bosnia and Herzegovina. The UNSC Resolution 1022 formally suspended the sanctions on Serbia the day after the Dayton Agreement was signed, on 22 November 1995.

When the Bosnian War ended, UN sanctions against Yugoslavia were fully lifted after the Bosnian elections on 14 September 1996, though an 'outer wall' of sanctions – membership in international financial institutions – remained, linked to cooperation with the ICTY and human rights in Kosovo. The 1 October 1996 United Nations Security Council Resolution 1074 terminated all previous resolutions against FR Yugoslavia. In spite of the lifting of UN sanctions, the United States maintained an "outer wall" of sanctions, preventing Yugoslavia from becoming a member of international institutions.

A second series of international sanctions were imposed against Yugoslavia in 1998 when violence in Kosovo intensified. On March 31, 1998, the UNSC passed Resolution 1160, placing an arms embargo on Yugoslavia. These measures were followed by the European Union banning of JAT Yugoslav Airlines from flying to EU member states and the freezing of Yugoslav government assets in EU member states. On March 24, 1999, NATO began bombing Yugoslavia, and the United States and European Union enacted further trade and financial aid bans, including a ban on exporting oil to Yugoslavia. The European Union ended its sanctions on Yugoslavia on October 9, 2000, allowing EU members to share commercial flights and trade oil with Yugoslavia.

== Hyperinflation under sanctions ==
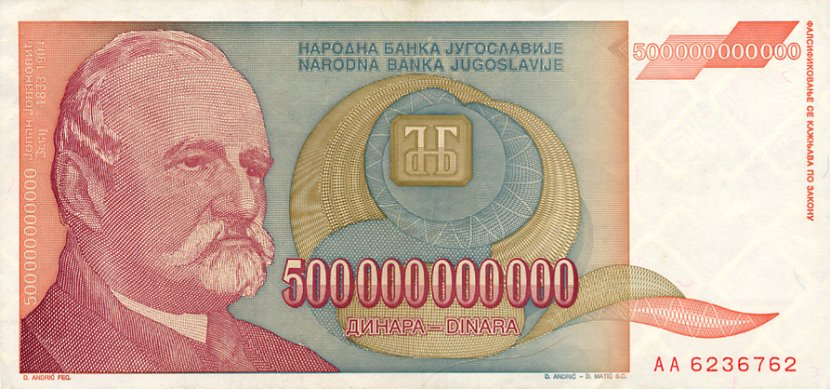
Shown above is a 500 billion dinar banknote printed in 1993. The first hyperinflation of the Yugoslav dinar in Serbia and Montenegro lasted from 1992 to 1994.

Starting from 1992, the money supply of the economy of FR Yugoslavia grew enormously to fund the wars, resulting in a protracted hyperinflation episode which lasted for a total of 25 months. In 1993, the dinar recorded a monthly inflation rate of 313 million percent. The hyperinflation reached a crescendo when the dinar's monthly inflation reached a staggering 5.578 quintillion percent.

During the peak of the hyperinflation January 1994, the Yugoslav government recruited Dragoslav Avramović, a former World Bank economist, as an economic adviser. On January 24, 1994, Avramović put in force a new Yugoslav dinar with a value ratio of 1:1 to that of the Deutsche Mark. For several months afterwards, the money supply stabilised, so the dinar recorded virtually no devaluation, and shortages of various necessities were noticeably reduced. As a result of the success of the new dinar, Avramović was named governor of the National Bank of Yugoslavia in Serbia and Montenegro on March 2, 1994. Avramović told The New York Times that he thought his fiscal program could be sustained in spite of the sanctions, saying the following:

The currency is steady, we have achieved agricultural independence and industrial production is up 40 percent since the end of last year. We hope sanctions will be lifted, because all they do is create enemies. But our program is sustainable whatever happens.

Economists disagreed whether hyperinflation could be avoided with the international sanctions. Ljubomir Madžar, an economist, was quoted in the same NYT article as saying the following:

Hard-currency reserves are not sufficient, production cannot achieve sustained expansion under an embargo, and so the budget deficit must grow by the end of the year, leading to new hyperinflation."

Avramović was voted out of the position in 1996 by the National Assembly of Yugoslavia. International sanctions were re-instated in 1998 due to the Kosovo War, and by 1999, the Yugoslav dinar had devalued to 30 dinars for a Deutsche Mark.

== Effects on the people ==
In 1989, the average income of inhabitants in Yugoslavia was approximately $3,000 per year. In October 1992, less than a year after the first sanctions were implemented, economist Miroljub Labus estimated that the average income at the time had fallen to approximately $1,500 per year. In September 1992, when gasoline was still available at some gas stations in Serbia and Montenegro, a gallon (3.8 litres) sold for the equivalent of 15 US dollars. As a result of the oil and gas restrictions imposed by the sanctions, owners of private vehicles in FR Yugoslavia were allotted a ration 3.5 gallons of gasoline per month by October 1992. By November 1992, the state had begun selling public gas stations to individuals in hopes of circumventing the sanctions on fuel. The gas stations were sold to individuals with large amounts of money and street authority; paramilitary leader Željko "Arkan" Ražnatović acquired several gas stations from the state at this time. As a result of the sanctions, many people stopped driving their cars. The public bus operator in Belgrade, GSP, no longer earned revenue since its fleet reduced due to lack of funding, which lead to overcrowding on buses after which tickets could no longer be collected from passengers. As a result, the safety GSP buses was gradually neglected, to the point in the late 1990s (after which sanctions had been re-introduced after the Kosovo insurgency started) where a passenger sitting over one of the wheels on the bus fell through the rusted floor and was instantly killed.

A Central Intelligence Agency assessment on the sanctions filed in 1993 noted that "Serbs have become accustomed to periodical shortages, long lines in stores, cold homes in the winter and restrictions on electricity". Medicinal supplies in hospitals experienced shortages in antibiotics, vaccines, and anti-cancer drugs. In October 1993, the office of the United Nations High Commissioner for Refugees in Belgrade estimated that approximately 3 million people living in Serbia and Montenegro were living at or below the poverty line. By late 1993, hospitals lacked basic antibiotics and functioning equipment such as X-ray devices. At this point gasoline stations had stopped providing fuel. In October 1993, in an attempt to conserve energy, the Yugoslav government began cutting off the heat and electricity throughout residential apartments. In November 1994, 87 patients died in Belgrade's Institute of Mental Health, which had no heat, food, or medicine. Patients in the hospital were reportedly walking around naked with little supervision. In May 1994, The New York Times reported that suicide rates had increased by 22% since sanctions were first implemented against Yugoslavia.

In the Yugoslav republic of Montenegro, the largest aluminium smelter in the region, Aluminium Plant Podgorica, stopped working after the implementation of sanctions. In 1993, the president of the Republic of Montenegro within Yugoslavia, Momir Bulatović, said that the sanctions were causing massive food shortages in Montenegro.

== Underground economy ==
The implementation of sanctions corresponded with the emergence of an underground economy. Although there was no legal import of cigarettes during the sanctions, a market of low-quality and fake cigarettes, alcohol, and various street drugs took in its place.

Although the sanctions included restrictions on gasoline, smugglers tried to profit by purchasing gas from across the Yugoslav border. Although some smugglers made large profits, the business was very risky, since they made their purchases in hard cash. In some cases they were an ideal target for various mafia groups, which could profit from killing smugglers and taking their cash intended to import gas into Yugoslavia. A former smuggler who was active in Montenegro during the sanctions, Zoran Ilinčić, told Vijesti that at least 10 smugglers were killed on the borders of Hungary, Romania, and Bulgaria by late 1992.

As the existing banks experienced widespread closing, several pyramid schemes took place. Fraudulent banks, such as Jugoskandik and the infamous Dafiment Bank were set up by opportunistic criminals to lure people with extraordinary interest rates. Many people who fell for the pyramid banks were left homeless.

== In popular culture ==
- Dnevnik uvreda 1993 (1994)
- Tamna je noć (1995)
- See You in the Obituary (1995)
- The Wounds (1998)
- Black Cat, White Cat (1998)

== Bibliography ==
- The Mandala Projects (2012). "Serbia Sanctions (SERBSANC)". The Mandala Projects. 391. Archived from the original on 2015-05-12.
- IMF (2014). "Report for Selected Countries and Subjects: Serbia". imf.org. IMF.
- Jovanovic, Predrag; Sukovic, Danilo (2001). "A decade under sanctions". Transparentnost. Archived from the original on 2016-08-13.
- Comras, Victor D (6 November 2012). "Successful Sanctions – Serbia and Montenegro, 1992-1995". International Relations and Security Network (ISN) ETH Zurich. Archived from the original on February 2, 2016.
