= Montenegro–Palestine relations =

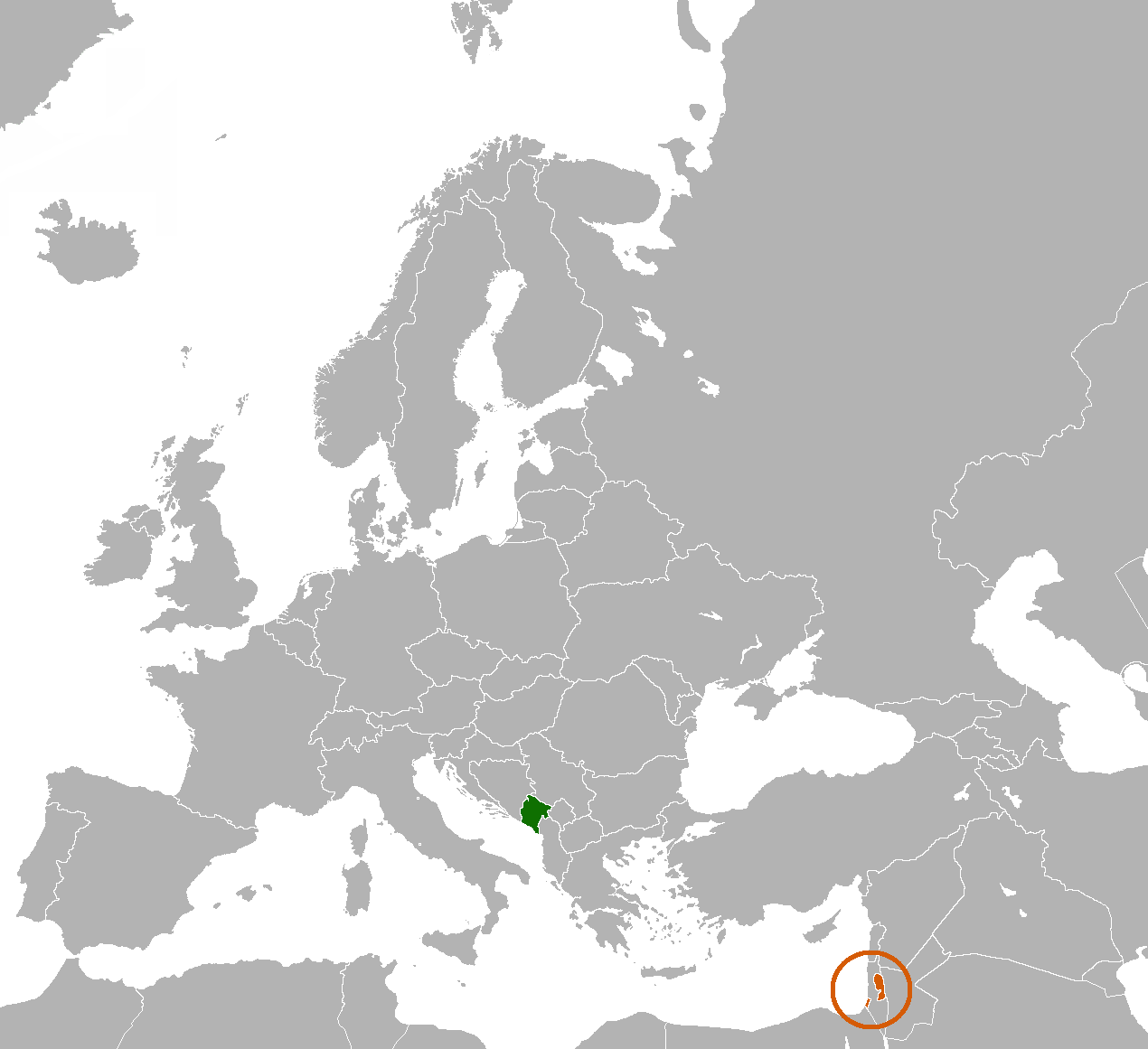

- Montenegro: Palestine

Montenegro–Palestine relations, refers to the bilateral relations between Montenegro and Palestine. Palestine recognized the independence of Montenegro on 24 July 2006 and the nations established diplomatic relations on 1 August 2006. Montenegro supports Palestine's demand for sovereignty over the territories occupied in 1967, and there is joint cooperation in cultural heritage and tourism. Both countries are members of the Union for the Mediterranean and both once ruled under the Ottoman Empire.

According to the Montenegrin government, "relations between Montenegro and the State of Palestine are friendly, based on respect, mutual understanding and the principles of openness." Montenegro has a large Muslim population of Albanians and Bosniaks, who support Palestine.

== History ==
=== Yugoslavia ===
Between 1918 and 2006, Montenegro was part of Yugoslavia, during which time its international relations were handled by Yugoslavia. The house of Karađorđević, the monarchy of Yugoslavia, were nationalists and Zionists who supported the creation of a Jewish state. However, following World War II, after the League of Communists of Yugoslavia took power, for a time, the communist government facilitated aliyah, the immigration of Jews to the region of Palestine before and after the creation of the State of Israel. However, relations with the fledgling State of Israel were rough. This culminated in 1967, following the Six-Day War, in which Yugoslavia voiced support for the Arab world and with Palestine, and broke off diplomatic relations with Israel.

=== Post-independence ===
In the 1990s, as Yugoslav republics became independent, each developed its own stance on the issue of Palestine and Israel, with some recognizing Palestine and others not. While Serbian governments, such as that of Slobodan Milošević, had taken a pro-Israel stance, Montenegro quickly adopted a pro-Palestine stance, establishing relations with Palestine on 1 August, 2006.

Palestine assigned a non-resident ambassador to Montenegro, Adham Mustafa A. Abomadalala, on 21 January 2008. On 10 October, 2016, he was replaced by Rabii Alnantouli. On 1 August 2019, Montenegro assigned its first non-resident ambassador to Palestine, Milorad Šćepanović.

There have been several diplomatic missions between the two countries. On 25 February 2010, Palestinian Foreign Minister Riyad al-Maliki visited Montenegro. On 15 March, 2010, former president of the parliament of Montenegro Ranko Krivokapić visited Palestine and met with Palestinian president Salam Fayyad. From 3-5 October 2010, Milan Roćen, former Montenegrin Minister of Foreign Affairs, visited Palestine. On 23 September 2017, former Minister of Foreign Affairs Srđan Darmanović met with al-Malki at the 72nd session of the UN General Assembly. On 18 July, 2018, Darmanović met with prime minister of Palestine Rami Hamdallah, as well as presidential advisor Nabil Shat and chief negotiator Saeb Erekat.

On 22 October, a pro-Palestine protest was held in Podgorica. On 27 October 2023, Montenegro was one of 121 countries to vote in favor of a General Assembly resolution calling for an immediate ceasefire to the Gaza war.

On 18 August 2024, a mural painted by Mišo Joškić, proclaiming that "Montenegro stands with Palestine" and depicting smiling Palestinian children, was unveiled. The mural has become a site of pro-Palestine protests.

In 25 September 2025, president of Montenegro Jakov Milatović said, "Montenegro expresses deep concern about the deteriorating humanitarian situation of the Palestinian people in Gaza. We call for an immediate ceasefire."

== Economy ==
Economic ties between Palestine and Montenegro includes tourism as a key factor. Efforts have been made to enable a tourism industry between the two countries.

In 2019, Palestinian investment in Montenegro €450,000.

== See also ==
- "Josip Broz Tito" Art Gallery of the Nonaligned Countries
