= International rankings of Montenegro =

The following are international rankings of Montenegro.

== Economy ==
- The Heritage Foundation/The Wall Street Journal Index of Economic Freedom 2010, ranked 68 out of 179

== Media ==
- Reporters Without Borders Worldwide Press Freedom Index 2009, ranked 77 out of 175

== Politics ==
- Transparency International Corruption Perceptions Index 2009, ranked 69 out of 180

== Society ==
- United Nations Development Programme Human Development Index 2009, ranked 65 out of 182

== Technology ==
- World Economic Forum Networked Readiness Index Networked Readiness Index 2008–2009, ranked 71 out of 134
- World Intellectual Property Organization: Global Innovation Index 2026, ranked 76 out of 139 countries

== Other ==
Organization	Survey	Ranking
Human Development Index	Human Development Report 2009	65 out of 182
The Global Information Technology	The Global Information Technology Report 2009-2010	42 out of 133
Corruption Perceptions Index	Corruption Perceptions Index 2009	69 out of 180
The Global Competitiveness Report	The Global Competitiveness Report 2010/2011	49 out of 132
Reporters Without Borders	Worldwide Press Freedom Index 2009	77 out of 175
The Heritage Foundation/The Wall Street Journal	Index of Economic Freedom 2010^{[unfit]}	68 out of 179
Transparency International	Corruption Perceptions Index 2009	69 out of 180
United Nations Development Programme	Human Development Index 2009	65 out of 182
Networked Readiness Index	Networked Readiness Index 2008-2009	71 out of 134
