= Geography of Montenegro =

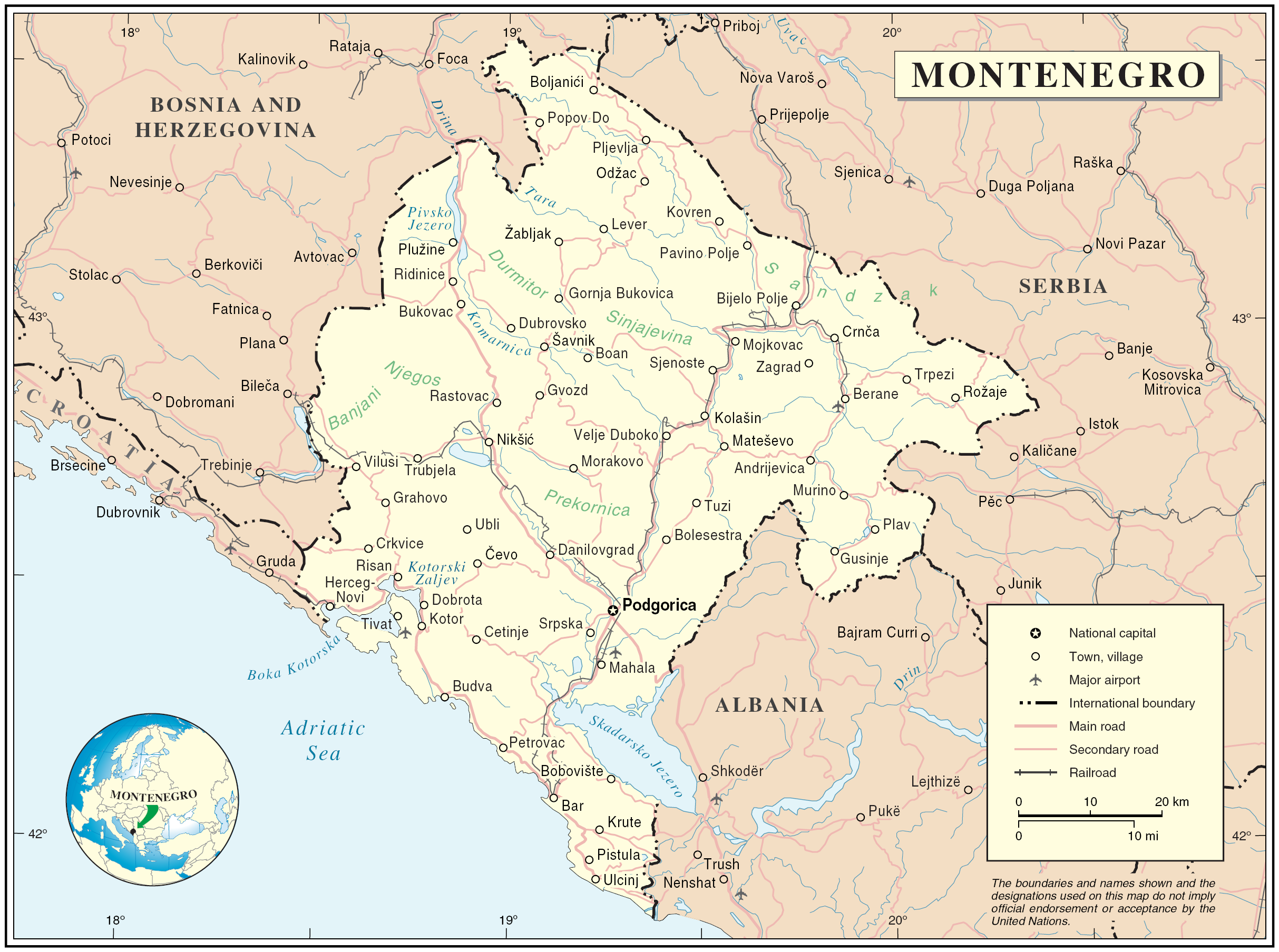
- Continent: Europe
- Region: Southeast Europe
- Coordinates: 42°00′N 19°00′E
- Area
  - Total: 13,883 km^{2} (5,360 sq mi)
- Coastline: 294 km (183 mi)
- Highest point: Zla Kolata, 2,534 m
- Lowest point: Adriatic Sea, 0 m
- Longest river: Morača
- Largest lake: Lake Skadar
- Climate: Mediterranean climate

Montenegro (Montenegrin: Црна Гора, romanized: Crna Gora; lit. 'Black Mountain') is a small, mountainous country in Southeast Europe. It borders Croatia, Bosnia and Herzegovina, Serbia, Kosovo, Albania and the Adriatic Sea. While being a small country at 13,812 km^{2} (5,333 sq mi), it is very diverse regarding the terrain configuration. Montenegro has 50 peaks of over 2,000 m (6,600 ft) in altitude.

== Terrain ==
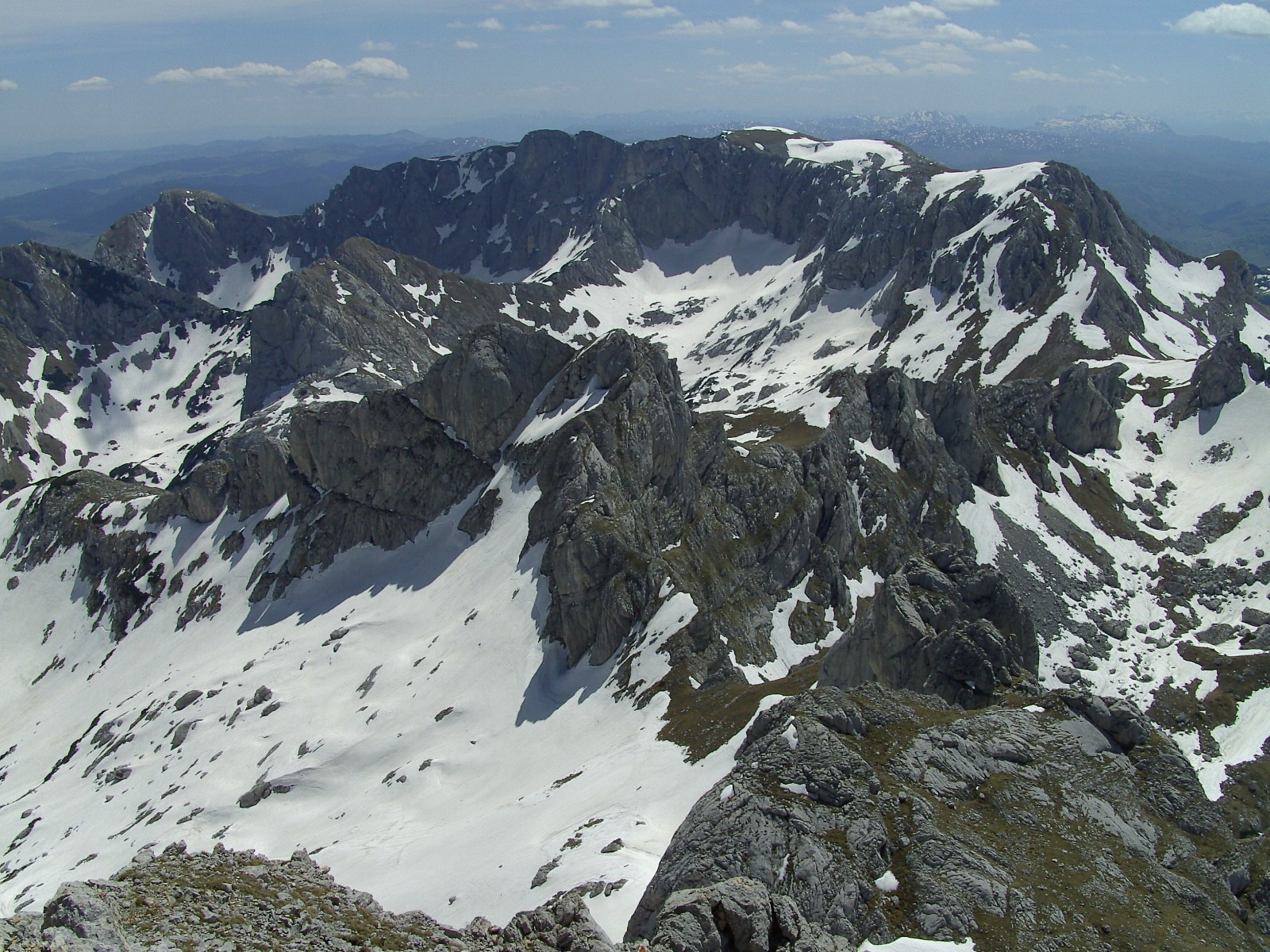
Durmitor, northern region of Montenegro

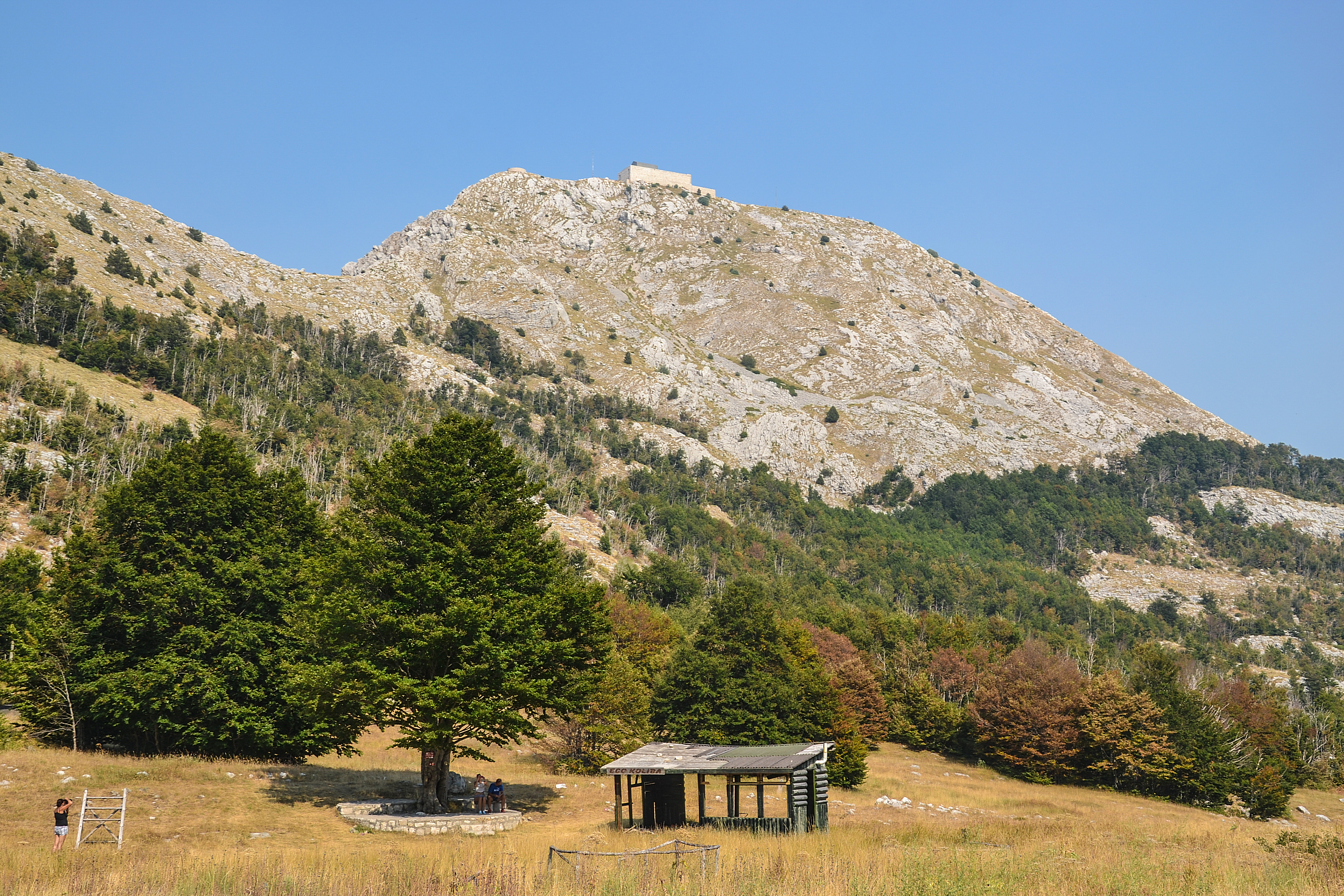
Lovćen, southern region of Montenegro

Terrain in Montenegro ranges from high mountains in the northern part of the country, through karst segment in central and western part, to almost 300 km (190 mi) of a narrow coastal plain. The coastal plain disappears completely in the north, where Mount Lovćen and other mountain ranges plunge abruptly into the inlet of the Gulf of Kotor. The coastal region is noted for active seismicity.

Montenegro's section of the karst lies generally at elevations of 1,000 m (3,281 ft) above sea level-although some areas rise to 1,800 m (5,906 ft). The lowest segment is in the valley of the Zeta River, which flows at an elevation ranging from 650 m (2,133 ft) to 45 m (148 ft). The river occupies the centre of Nikšić field, a flat-floored, elongated depression typical of karstic regions. The underlying rock is predominantly limestone, which dissolves to form sinkholes and caves. The longest cave in Montenegro is Vražji firovi – 10,5 km long cave north-east from Berane, and the deepest sinkhole is Željezna jama −1027 m on mount Maganik.

The Zeta River Valley, or Bjelopavlići plain, merges in the southeast with the second significant flat lowland in Montenegro, the Zeta plain. Zeta plain stretches north of the Lake Scutari at elevation of 40 m (131 ft). The two plains are today the most densely populated areas of Montenegro, housing the two biggest Montenegrin cities, Podgorica and Nikšić.

The high mountains of Montenegro include some of the most rugged terrain in Europe. They average more than 2,000 m (6,562 ft) in elevation. Among notable peaks is Bobotov Kuk in the Durmitor mountain, which reaches 2,523 m (8,278 ft). The Montenegrin mountains were the most ice-eroded section of the Balkan Peninsula during the last glacial period.

=== Coast ===
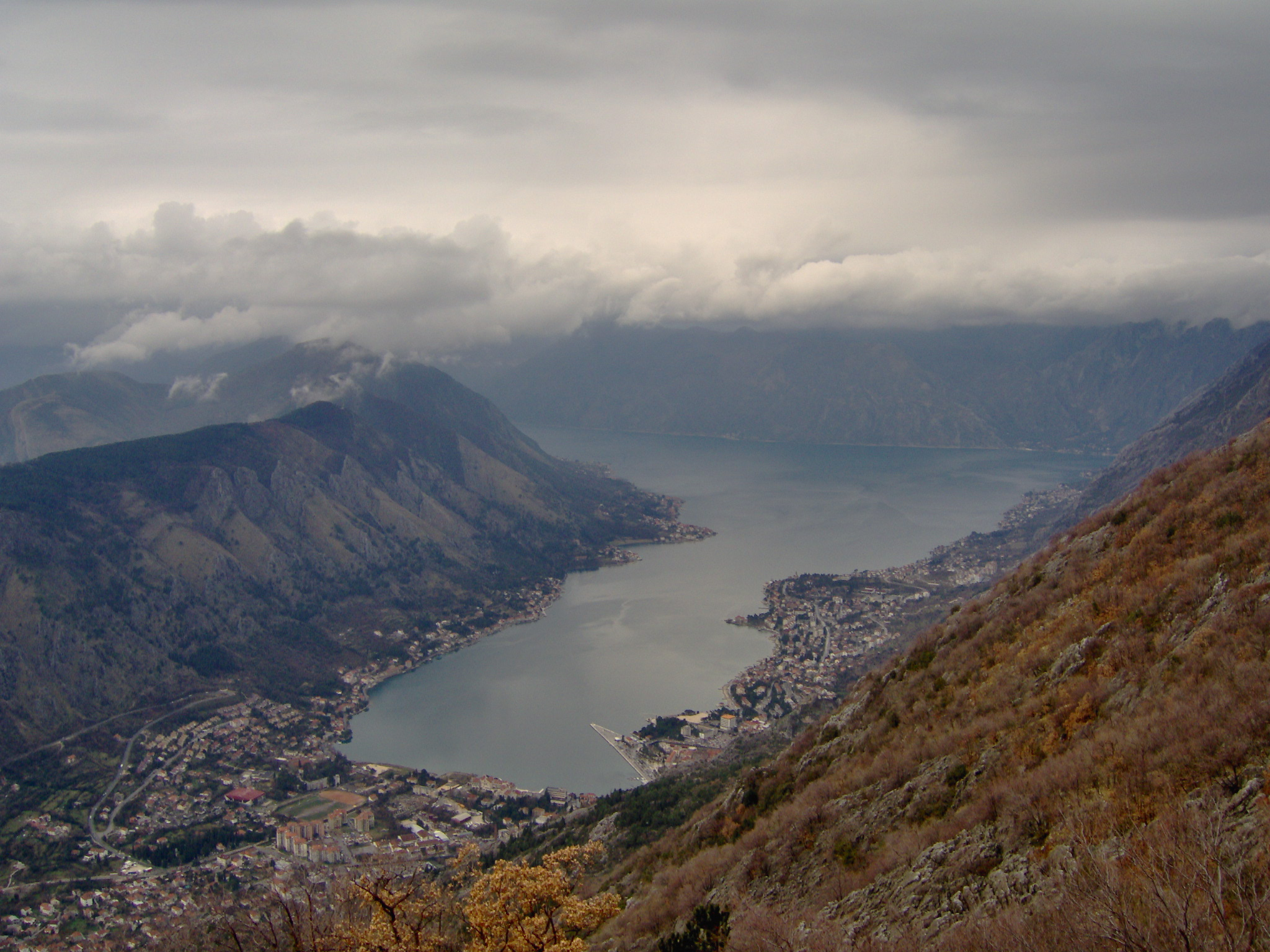
Bay of Kotor region

The coast of Montenegro is 294 km (183 mi) long. Unlike its northern neighbour Croatia, Montenegro has no large inhabited islands along the coast. A notable feature of the Montenegrin coast is Bay of Kotor, a fjord-like gulf, which is in fact a submerged river canyon. The Bay of Kotor is surrounded by mountains up to 1,000 m (3,281 ft) high, which plunge almost vertically into the sea.

To the south of the Bay of Kotor, there is a narrow coastal plain, no more than 4 km wide, which is guarded from the north by high mountains. The plain provided space for numerous small coastal settlements.

=== Hydrology ===
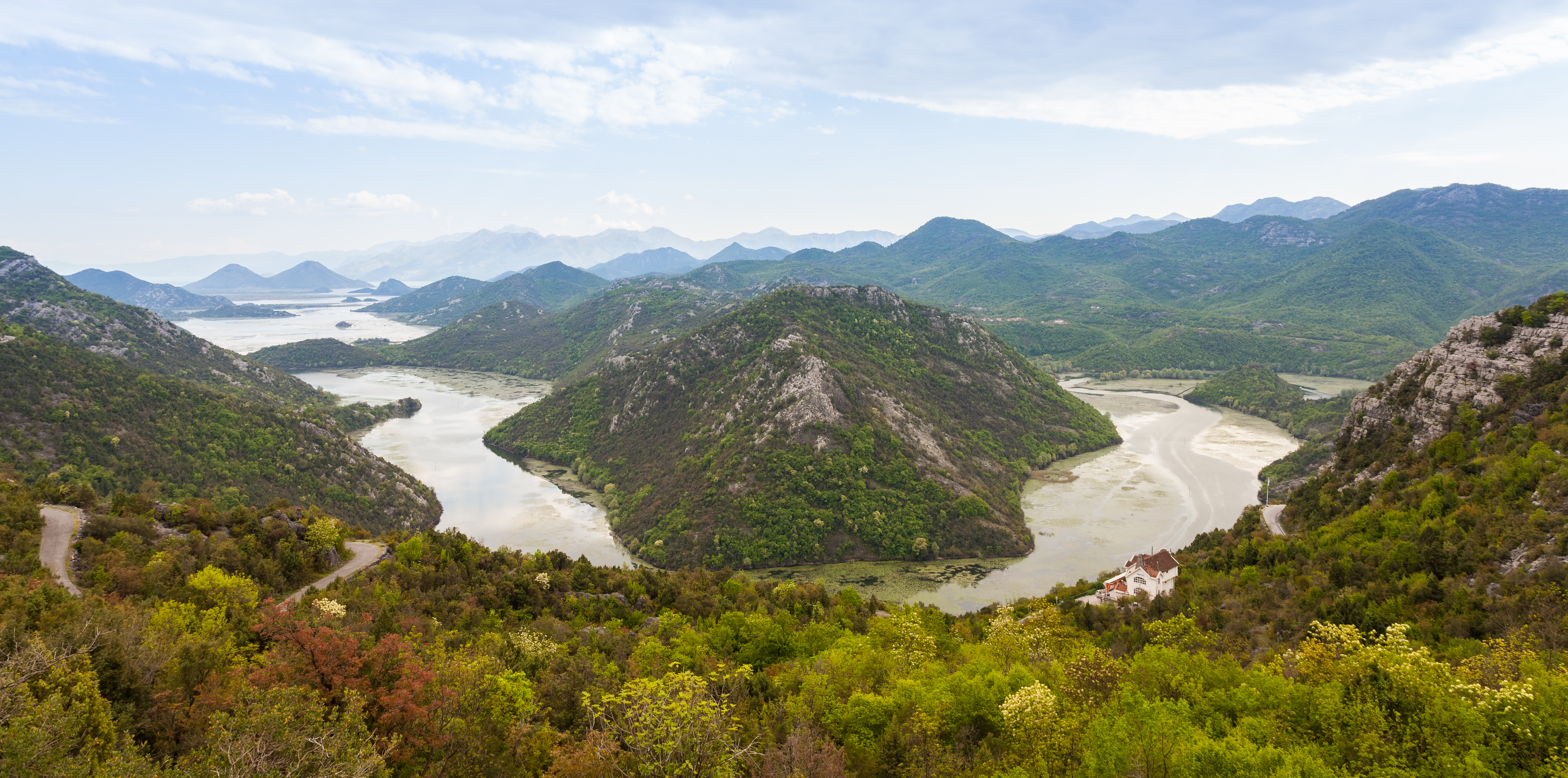
Lake Skadar in Montenegro

Montenegro's surface runoff in the north is carried away by the Ibar, Lim and Tara river systems, which enter the Danube via the Drina River of Bosnia and Herzegovina. In southern Montenegro, streams flow toward the Adriatic Sea. Much of the drainage of the karstic region is not on the surface but travels in underground channels.

The largest lake in Montenegro and the Balkans is Lake Scutari. Known in Montenegro as Skadarsko Jezero, it lies near the coast and extends across the international border into northern Albania. It is 50 km (31 mi) long and 16 km (9.9 mi) wide, with a total surface area of 370 km^{2} (142.9 sq mi). Some 60 percent lies within Montenegrin territory. The water body occupies a karstic polje depression that has a floor lying below sea level.

Montenegro's mountainous regions are noted for their numerous lakes.

Köppen-Geiger climate classification map of Montenegro

=== Climate ===
The climate of Montenegro is varied. On the coast, the climate is primarily a Mediterranean climate (Köppen classification: Csa), with hot to warm dry summers and mild winters with more humidity. In inland southern regions, the climate is subtropical/temperate (Köppen Cfa/Cfb), with similar temperature patters but no dry season. In the north, the climate is a continental climate (Köppen Dfb/Dfc), which experiences cold winters. The climate on the coast allows for the growth of olive and grape plants, as well as several different types of palm trees.

== Statistics ==
Geographic coordinates: 42°30′N 19°18′E

Area – comparative: similar in size to The Bahamas

Area

Total: 13,812 km^{2} (5,332 sq mi)

Land: 13,452 km^{2} (5,193 sq mi)

Water: 360 km^{2} (138 sq mi)

Population: 620,029 (2011 census); 653,474 (2013 estimate )

Length of the coast (coastline): 293.5 km (182 mi)

Length of the international borders: 625 km (388 mi) (all)

- With Croatia: 14 km (8 mi) or 25 km (15 mi)
- With Bosnia and Herzegovina: 225 km (139 mi)
- With Serbia: 124 km (77 mi)
- and with Albania: 172 km (106 mi)

Land under cultivation: 517,153 ha

Land use:

- arable land: 12.45%
- permanent crops: 1.16%
- other: 86.39%

Irrigated land: 24.12 km^{2}

Maritime claims: 12 nm

Points

- Lowest point
  - Adriatic Sea – 0 m
- Highest point
  - Bobotov Kuk – 2,522 m
- Northernmost point:
  - Moćevići, Pljevlja municipality – 43°32′N 18°58′E
- Southernmost point:
  - Mala Ada, Ulcinj municipality – 41°55′N 19°22′E
- Easternmost point:
  - Jablanica, Rožaje municipality – 42°53′N 20°21′E
- Westernmost point:
  - Prijevor, Herceg Novi municipality – 42°29′N 18°26′E

== Extreme temperatures in Montenegro ==
Climate data for Montenegro
Month	Jan	Feb	Mar	Apr	May	Jun	Jul	Aug	Sep	Oct	Nov	Dec	Year
Record high °C (°F)	21.2 (70.2)	27.2 (81.0)	27.4 (81.3)	33.8 (92.8)	35.4 (95.7)	40.5 (104.9)	43.3 (109.9)	44.8 (112.6)	39.6 (103.3)	32.6 (90.7)	28.4 (83.1)	22.6 (72.7)	44.8 (112.6)
Record low °C (°F)	−29.8 (−21.6)	−26.3 (−15.3)	−25.3 (−13.5)	−14.6 (5.7)	−10.0 (14.0)	−4.0 (24.8)	0.4 (32.7)	−0.2 (31.6)	−6.4 (20.5)	−11.3 (11.7)	−23.4 (−10.1)	−27.0 (−16.6)	−29.8 (−21.6)
Source: Hydrological and Meteorological Service of Montenegro

== See also ==
- Geology of Montenegro
- Geography of Europe

== Bibliography ==
- Poljak, Željko (February 1959). "Ostali članci o Crnoj Gori". Kazalo za "Hrvatski planinar" i "Naše planine" 1898—1958 (PDF). Naše planine (in Croatian). Vol. XI. p. 26. ISSN 0354-0650.
