= Geology of Montenegro =

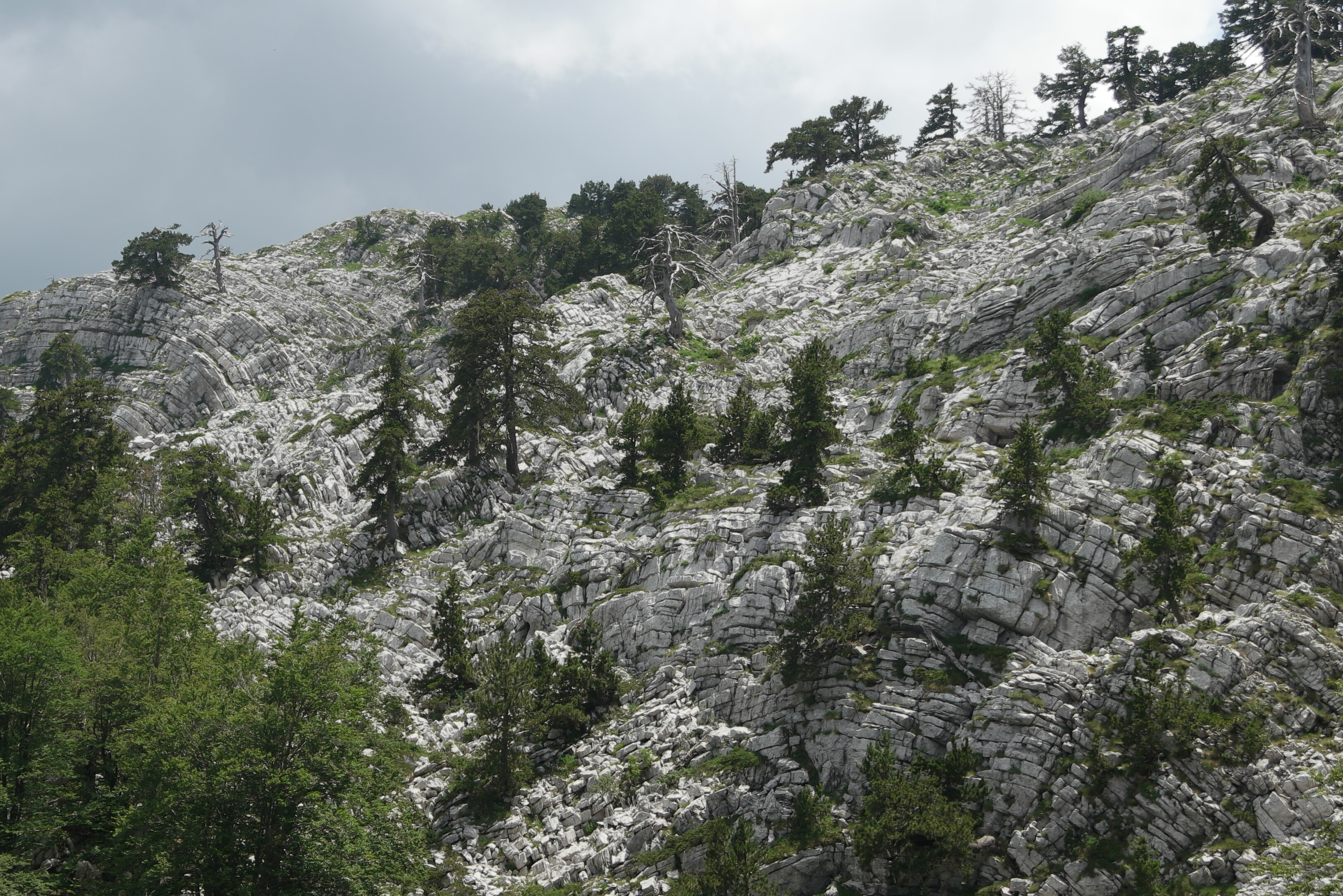
Folded layers of Upper Cretaceous limestone of the High Karst nappe at Bijela gora

The geology of Montenegro includes sedimentary and volcanic rocks from the Paleozoic through the Cenozoic, deposited atop poorly understood crystalline basement rock.

== Geologic history, stratigraphy and tectonics ==
- Dalmatian-Herzegovinian Zone: This Dinaridic zone was first described in 1948 as the Old Montenegro Overthrust and includes Anisian age flysch and limestone, thin Ladinian volcano-sedimentary rock, Late Triassic carbonates and Jurassic neritic carbonates, a break in deposition, and then thick Cretaceous, Paleocene and Eocene foraminiferal limestone. It spans southwestern Montenegro.
- Sarajevo Sigmoid: A belt of Mesozoic flysch units beginning in Albania and spanning central Montenegro toward the northwest. It is overthrust in the east along the Durmitor Nappe and includes shallow marine Permian and Triassic platform carbonates and clastic rocks. An unconformity separates lower units from Jurassic calcareous rocks and the Senonian Dumitor Flysch.
- East Bosnian-Durmitor Block: Much of northern and eastern inland Montenegro is underlain by this pile of nappe features, dating back to the Devonian. Paleozoic rocks include slightly metamorphosed fine-grained clastics, with conglomerate, limestone and keratophyre lenses. Continental clastics, limestone and volcanic rocks following an unconformity begin in the Triassic. Metamorphosed mafic rocks are found in the southeast, surrounded by unusual granite body which may have resulted from uncommon in situ granitization.

Other geologic features include:

- Vlajna-Kukavica Mountain
- Cehotina Nappe
