= Montenegro =

Country in Southeastern Europe

Montenegro Crna Gora Црна Гора
- Flag Coat of arms
- Anthem: Oj, svijetla majska zoro (English: "Oh, Bright Dawn of May")
- Location of Montenegro (green) in Europe (dark grey) – [Legend]
- Capital and largest city: Podgorica (Note: Podgorica is the administrative capital while Cetinje is considered the old royal capital.); 42°47′N 19°28′E
- Official languages: Montenegrin
- Recognised national languages: Albanian; Bosnian; Croatian; Serbian
- Ethnic groups (2023 census) (Note: Excluding the categories of "no response" and "unknown"): 41.1% Montenegrins; 32.9% Serbs; 11.1% Bosniaks or Muslims; 5.0% Albanians; 2.1% Russians; 5.8% others or undeclared
- Religion (2023 census): 74.9% Christianity; 71.1% Eastern Orthodoxy; 3.2% Catholicism; 0.6% other Christian; 19.9% Islam; 2.7% no religion; 0.3% other; 2.2% not stated
- Demonym: Montenegrin
- Government: Unitary parliamentary republic
  - President: Jakov Milatović
  - Prime Minister: Milojko Spajić
  - President of the Parliament: Andrija Mandić
- Legislature: Parliament

Establishment history
  - Duklja: 10th century
  - Zeta: 1356
  - Prince-Bishopric of Montenegro: 1516
  - Principality of Montenegro: 13 March 1852
  - Treaty of Berlin: 13 July 1878
  - Kingdom of Montenegro: 28 August 1910
  - Kingdom of Yugoslavia: 1 December 1918
  - SFR Yugoslavia: 29 November 1945
  - Serbia and Montenegro: 27 April 1992
  - Independence declared: 3 June 2006

Area
  - Total: 13,883 km^{2} (5,360 sq mi) (155th)
  - Water (%): 3.1

Population
  - January 2026 estimate: ▼622,902 (164th)
  - 2023 census: ▲623,633
  - Density: 43.6/km^{2} (112.9/sq mi) (173rd)
- GDP (PPP): 2026 estimate
  - Total: ▲$22.69 billion (152nd)
  - Per capita: ▲$36,330 (61st)
- GDP (nominal): 2026 estimate
  - Total: ▲$10.23 billion (149th)
  - Per capita: ▲$16,380 (68th)
- Gini (2023): ▼29.4 low inequality
- HDI (2023): ▲0.862 very high (48th)
- Currency: Euro (€) (Note: Adopted unilaterally; Montenegro is not a member of the Eurozone.) (EUR)
- Time zone: UTC+1 (CET)
  - Summer (DST): UTC+2 (CEST)
- Calling code: +382
- ISO 3166 code: ME
- Internet TLD: .me

Montenegro (Note: Montenegrin: Crna Gora / Црна Гора) is a country in Southeastern Europe, on the Balkan Peninsula. Its 25 municipalities have a total population of 633,158 people in an area of 13,883 km^{2} (5,360 sq mi). It is bordered by Serbia to the northeast, Bosnia and Herzegovina to the northwest, Kosovo to the east, Albania to the southeast, and Croatia to the west, and has a coastline along the Adriatic Sea to the southwest. The capital and largest city is Podgorica, while Cetinje is the Old Royal Capital and cultural centre.

Before the arrival of the Slav peoples in the Balkans in the 6th and 7th centuries CE, the area now known as Montenegro was inhabited principally by people known as Illyrians. During the Early Medieval period, three principalities were located on the territory of modern-day Montenegro: Duklja, roughly corresponding to the southern half; Travunia, the west; and Rascia proper, the north. The Principality of Zeta emerged in the 14th and 15th centuries. From the late 14th century to the late 18th century, large parts of southern Montenegro were ruled by the Venetian Republic and incorporated into Venetian Albania. The name Montenegro was first used to refer to the country in the late 15th century. After falling under Ottoman Empire rule, Montenegro gained semi-autonomy in 1696 under the rule of the House of Petrović-Njegoš, first as a theocracy and later as a secular principality. Montenegro's independence was recognised by the Great Powers at the Congress of Berlin in 1878. In 1910, the country became a kingdom. After World War I, the kingdom became part of Yugoslavia. Following the breakup of Yugoslavia, the republics of Serbia and Montenegro together proclaimed a federation. In June 2006 Montenegro declared its independence following a referendum.

Montenegro has an upper-middle-income economy, mostly service-based, and is in late transition to a market economy. It is a member of the United Nations, NATO, the World Trade Organization, the Organization for Security and Co-operation in Europe, the Council of Europe, and the Central European Free Trade Agreement. Montenegro is also a founding member of the Union for the Mediterranean, and has been in the process of joining the European Union since 2012.

== Etymology ==
Montenegro's (/ˌmɒntɪˈniːɡroʊ, -ˈneɪɡroʊ, -ˈnɛɡroʊ/ MON-tin-E(E)G-roh, -AY-groh; Montenegrin: Crna Gora (Note: Written identically in Bosnian, Croatian and Serbian) / Црна Гора, (Note: Written identically in Serbian Cyrillic) Montenegrin pronunciation: [t͡sr̂ːnaː gǒra]; Albanian: Mali i Zi) English name is a literal translation from a Venetian calque of the Montenegrin phrase "Crna Gora", or "Black Mountain", deriving from the appearance of Mount Lovćen, which was covered in dense evergreen forests. Crna Gora was mentioned for the first time in edicts issued by Stefan Uroš I to the Serbian Orthodox Zeta Episcopate seat at Vranjina island in Lake Skadar. It came to denote the majority of contemporary Montenegro in the 15th century.

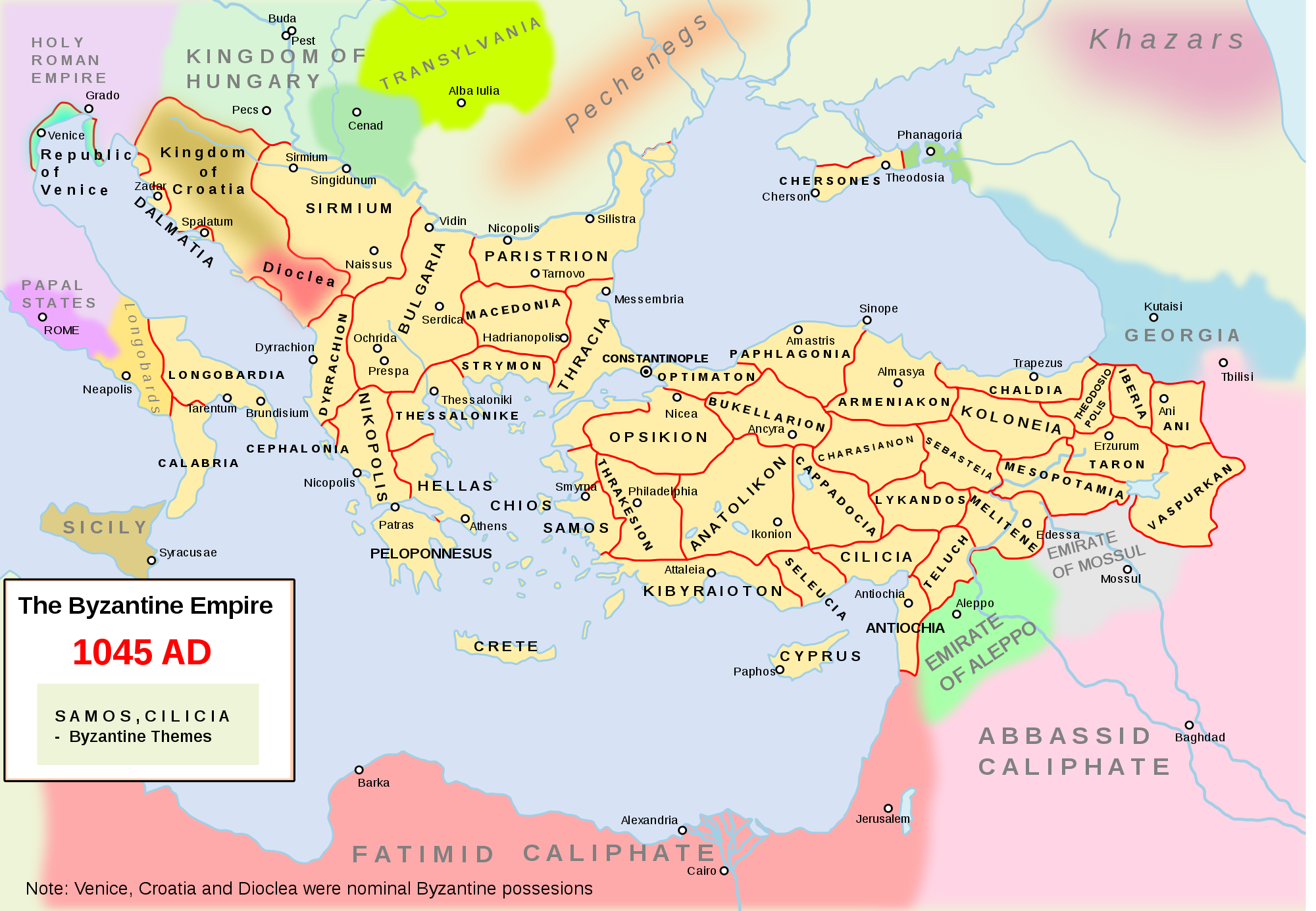
Duklja in the 11th century

Modern-day Montenegro was more and more known by that name in the historical period following the fall of the Serbian Despotate in 1459. Originally, it had referred to only a small strip of land under the rule of the Paštrovići tribe, but the name eventually came to be used for the wider mountainous region after the Crnojević noble family took power in Upper Zeta. The aforementioned region became known as Stara Crna Gora 'Old Montenegro' by the 19th century to distinguish the independent region from the neighbouring Ottoman-occupied Montenegrin territory of Brda (the "Highlands"). Montenegro further increased its size several times by the 20th century, as the result of wars against the Ottoman Empire, which saw the annexation of Old Herzegovina and parts of Metohija and southern Raška. Its borders have changed little since then, losing Metohija and gaining the Bay of Kotor.

After the second session of the AVNOJ during World War II in Yugoslavia, the contemporary modern state of Montenegro was founded as the Federal State of Montenegro (Montenegrin: Савезна држава Црне Горе / Savezna država Crne Gore) on 15 November 1943 within the Yugoslav Federation by the ZAVNOCGB. After the war, Montenegro became a republic under its name, the People's Republic of Montenegro (Montenegrin: Народна Република Црна Гора / Narodna Republika Crna Gora) on 29 November 1945. In 1963, it was renamed to the Socialist Republic of Montenegro (Montenegrin: Социјалистичка Република Црна Гора / Socijalistička Republika Crna Gora). As the breakup of Yugoslavia occurred, the SRCG was renamed to the Republic of Montenegro (Montenegrin: Република Црна Гора / Republika Crna Gora) on 27 April 1992 within the Federal Republic of Yugoslavia by removing the adjective "socialist" from the republic's title. Since 22 October 2007, a year after its independence, the name of the country became simply known as Montenegro.

== History ==
=== Antiquity ===
Modern-day Montenegro was part of Illyria and populated by the Indo-European-speaking Illyrians. The Illyrian kingdom was conquered by the Roman Republic in the Illyro-Roman Wars and the region was incorporated into the province of Illyricum (later Dalmatia and Praevalitana).

=== Arrival of the Slavs ===
Three principalities were located on the territory: Duklja, roughly corresponding to the southern half, Travunia, the west, and Raška, the north. Duklja gained its independence from the Byzantine Roman Empire in 1042. Over the next few decades, it expanded its territory to neighbouring Rascia and Bosnia, and also became recognised as a kingdom. Its power started declining at the beginning of the 12th century. After King Bodin's death (in 1101 or 1108), civil wars ensued. Duklja reached its zenith under Vojislav's son, Mihailo (1046–1081), and his grandson Constantine Bodin (1081–1101).

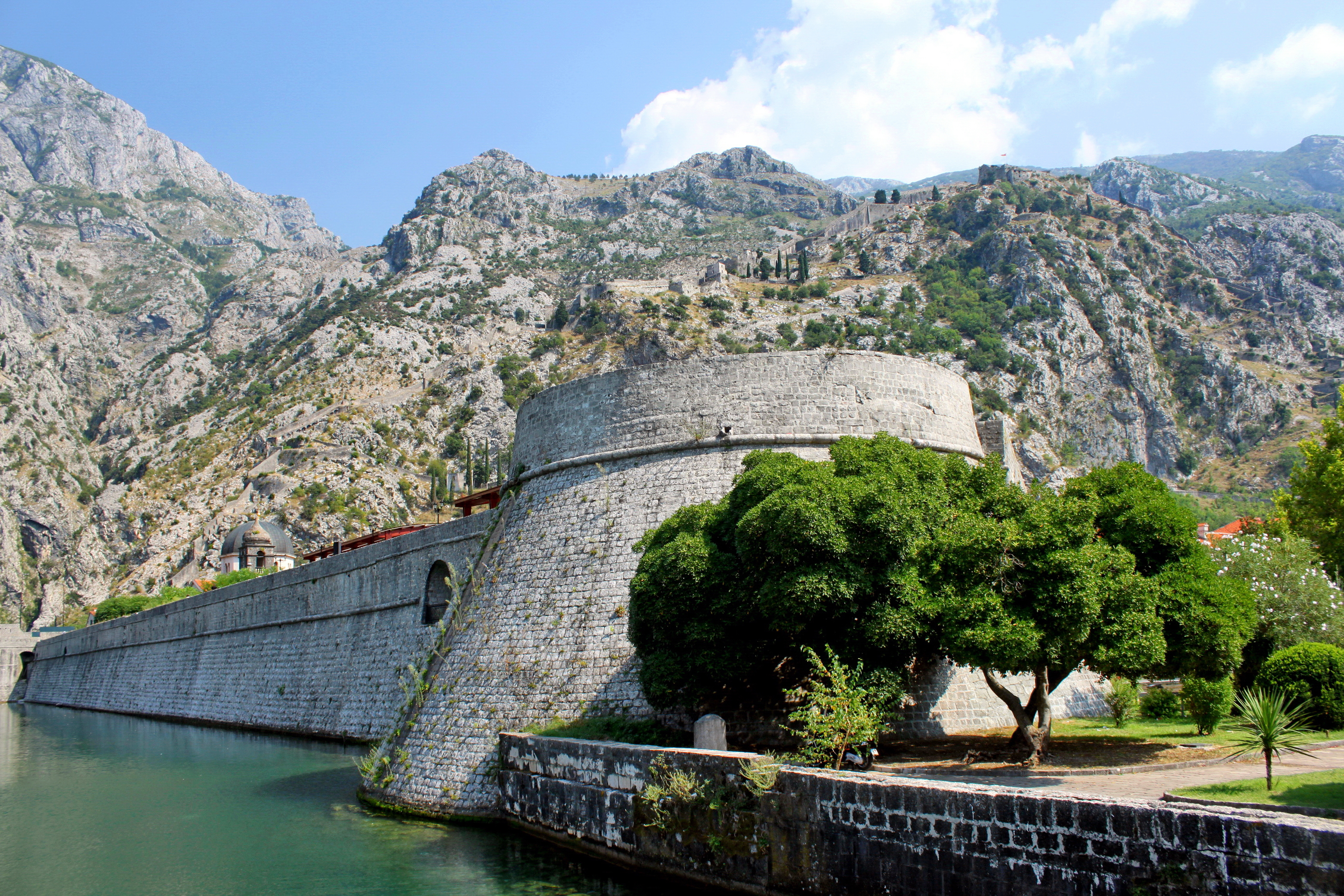
Fortifications of Kotor. Built between the 9th and 19th centuries, UNESCO World Heritage Site.

As the nobility fought for the throne, the kingdom was weakened, and by 1186, the territory of modern-day Montenegro became part of the state ruled by Stefan Nemanja and was a part of various state formations ruled by the Nemanjić dynasty for the next two centuries. After the Serbian Empire collapsed in the second half of the 14th century, the most powerful Zetan family, the Balšićs, became sovereigns of Zeta.

By the 13th century, Zeta had replaced Duklja when referring to the realm. In the late 14th century, southern Montenegro (Zeta) came under the rule of the Balšić noble family, then the Crnojević noble family, and by the 15th century, Zeta was more often referred to as Crna Gora.

In 1421, Zeta was annexed to the Serbian Despotate, but after 1455, another noble family from Zeta, the Crnojevićs, became sovereign rulers of the country, making it the last free monarchy of the Balkans before it fell to the Ottomans in 1496, and got annexed to the sanjak of Shkodër. For a short time, Montenegro existed as a separate autonomous sanjak in 1514–1528 (Sanjak of Montenegro). Also, Old Herzegovina region was part of Sanjak of Herzegovina.

=== Early modern period ===
From 1392, numerous parts of the territory were controlled by Republic of Venice, including the city of Budva, in that time known as "Budua". The Venetian territory was centred on the Bay of Kotor, and the Republic introduced governors who meddled in Montenegrin politics. Venice controlled territories in present-day Montenegro until its fall in 1797. Large portions fell under the control of the Ottoman Empire from 1496 to 1878. In the 16th century, Montenegro developed a unique form of autonomy within the Ottoman Empire that permitted Montenegrin clans freedom from certain restrictions. Nevertheless, the Montenegrins were disgruntled with Ottoman rule, and in the 17th century, repeatedly rebelled, which culminated in the defeat of the Ottomans in the Great Turkish War at the end of that century.

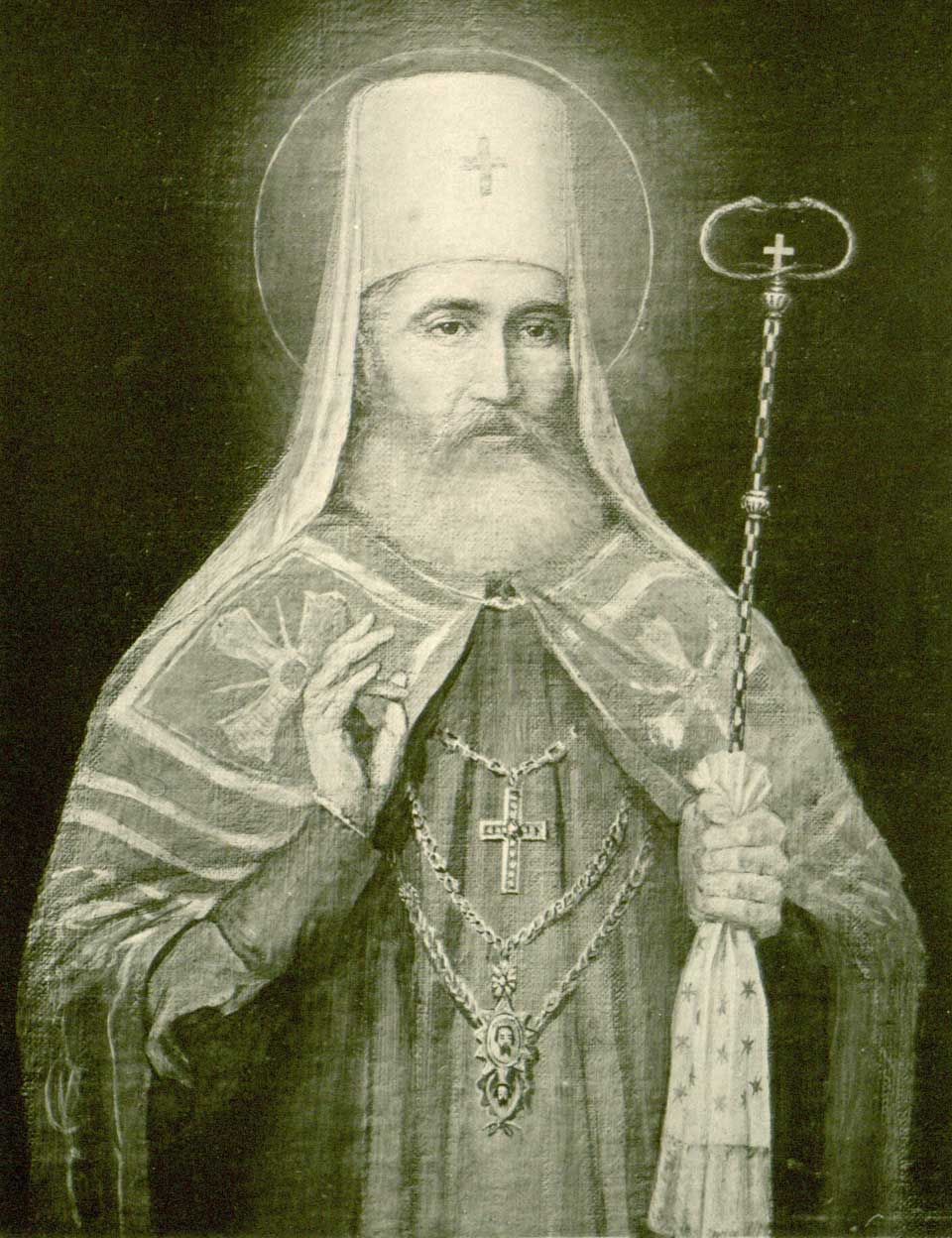
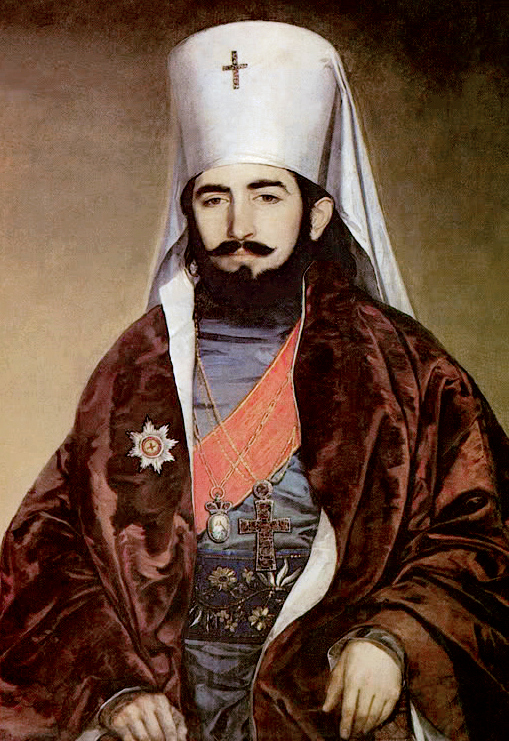
Left: Petar I Petrović-Njegoš was the most popular spiritual and military leader from the Petrović dynasty.
Right: Petar II Petrović-Njegoš was a Prince-Bishop (vladika) of Montenegro and the national poet and philosopher. Oil painting of Njegoš as vladika, c. 1837

Montenegrin territories were controlled by warlike clans. Most clans had a chieftain (knez), who was not permitted to assume the title unless he proved to be as worthy a leader as his predecessor. An assembly of Montenegrin clans (Zbor) was held every year on 12 July in Cetinje, and any adult clansman could take part. In 1515, Montenegro became a theocracy led by the Metropolitanate of Montenegro and the Littoral, which flourished after the Petrović-Njegoš of Cetinje became the prince-bishop (whose title was "Vladika of Montenegro").

People from Montenegro in this historical period were described as Orthodox Serbs.

=== Principality and Kingdom of Montenegro ===
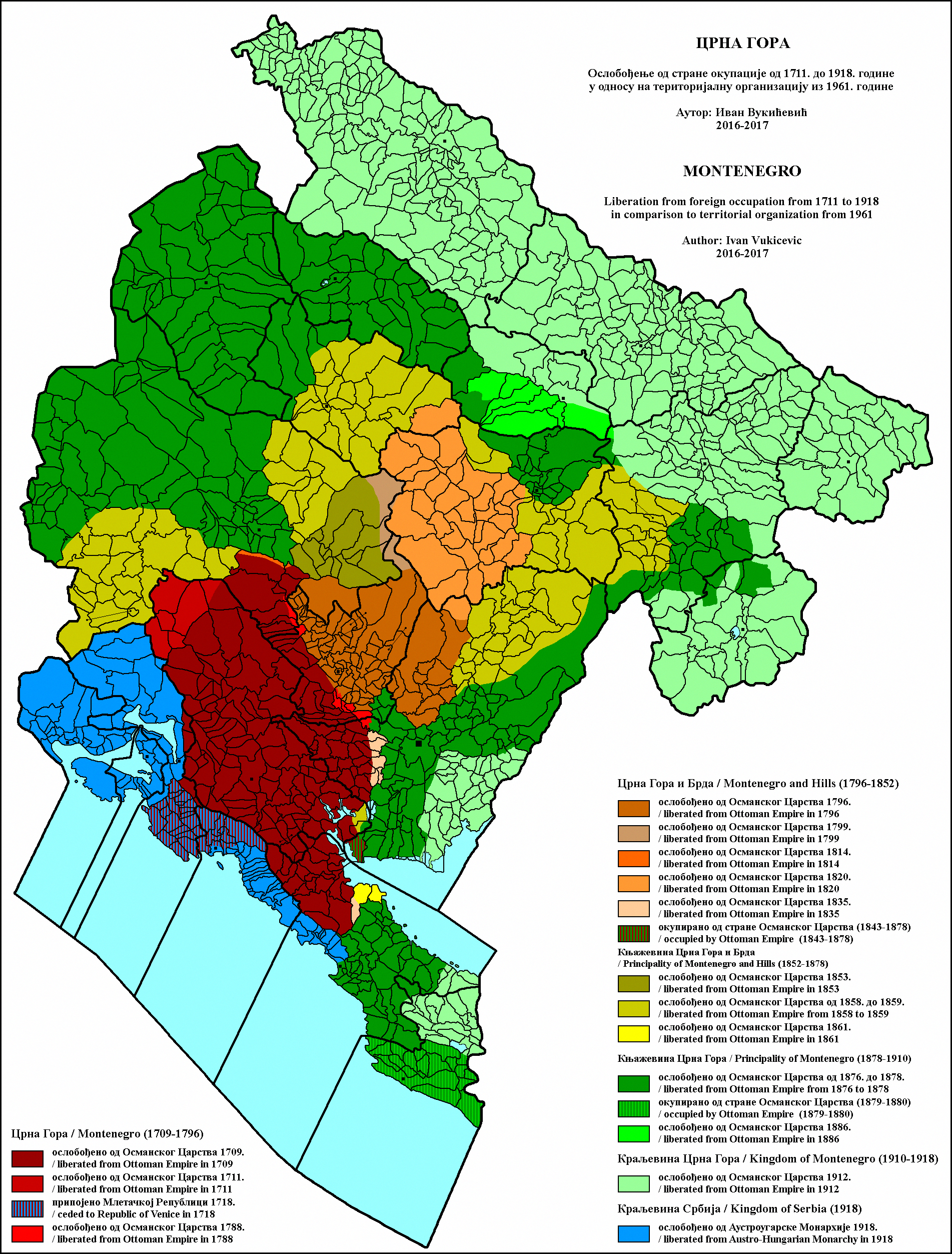
Expansion of Montenegro from 1711 to 1918 within present borders

In 1858, one of the major Montenegrin victories over the Ottomans occurred at the Battle of Grahovac. Grand Duke Mirko Petrović, elder brother of Knjaz Danilo, led an army of 7,500 and defeated the numerically superior Ottomans with 15,000 troops at Grahovac on 1 May 1858. This forced the Great Powers to officially demarcate the borders between Montenegro and Ottoman Empire, de facto recognising Montenegro's independence.

In the Battle of Vučji Do Montenegrins inflicted a major defeat on the Ottoman Army under Grand Vizier Ahmed Muhtar Pasha. In the aftermath of the Russian victory against the Ottoman Empire in the Russo-Turkish War of 1877–1878, the major powers restructured the map of the Balkan region. The Ottoman Empire recognised the independence of Montenegro in the Treaty of Berlin in 1878.

The first Montenegrin constitution (also known as the Danilo Code) was proclaimed in 1855. Under Nicholas I (ruled 1860–1918), the principality was enlarged several times in the Montenegro-Turkish Wars and was recognised as independent in 1878. Nicholas I established diplomatic relations with the Ottoman Empire. Minor border skirmishes excepted, diplomacy ushered in about 30 years of peace between the two states until the deposition of Abdul Hamid II in 1909.

The political skills of Abdul Hamid II and Nicholas I played a major role in the mutually amicable relations. Modernization of the state followed, culminating with the draft of a Constitution in 1905. However, political rifts emerged between the reigning People's Party, who supported the process of democratisation and union with Serbia, and those of the True People's Party, who were monarchist.

In 1910, Montenegro became a kingdom, and as a result of the Balkan Wars of 1912–1913, a common border with Serbia was established, with Shkodër being awarded to Albania, though the current capital city of Montenegro, Podgorica, was on the old border of Albania and Yugoslavia. Montenegro became one of the Allied Powers during World War I (1914–1918). In the Battle of Mojkovac fought in January 1916 between Austria-Hungary and the Kingdom of Montenegro, Montenegrins achieved a decisive victory even though they were outnumbered five to one, however this was not enough to prevent Montenegro's defeat, and the Austro-Hungarians accepted a military surrender on 25 January 1916. From 1916 to October 1918 Austria-Hungary occupied Montenegro. During the occupation, King Nicholas fled the country and established a government-in-exile in Bordeaux.

=== Kingdom of Yugoslavia ===
Locator map of Zeta Banovina in Kingdom of Yugoslavia

In 1922, Montenegro formally became the Oblast of Cetinje in the Kingdom of Serbs, Croats and Slovenes, with the addition of the coastal areas around Budva and Bay of Kotor. In a further restructuring in 1929, it became a part of a larger Zeta Banate of the Kingdom of Yugoslavia that reached the Neretva River.

Nicholas's grandson, the Serb King Alexander I, dominated the Yugoslav government. Zeta Banovina was one of nine banovinas that formed the kingdom; it consisted of the present-day Montenegro and parts of Serbia, Croatia, and Bosnia.

=== World War II and Socialist Yugoslavia ===
In April 1941, Nazi Germany, the Kingdom of Italy, and other Axis allies attacked and occupied the Kingdom of Yugoslavia. Italian forces occupied Montenegro and established a puppet Kingdom of Montenegro.

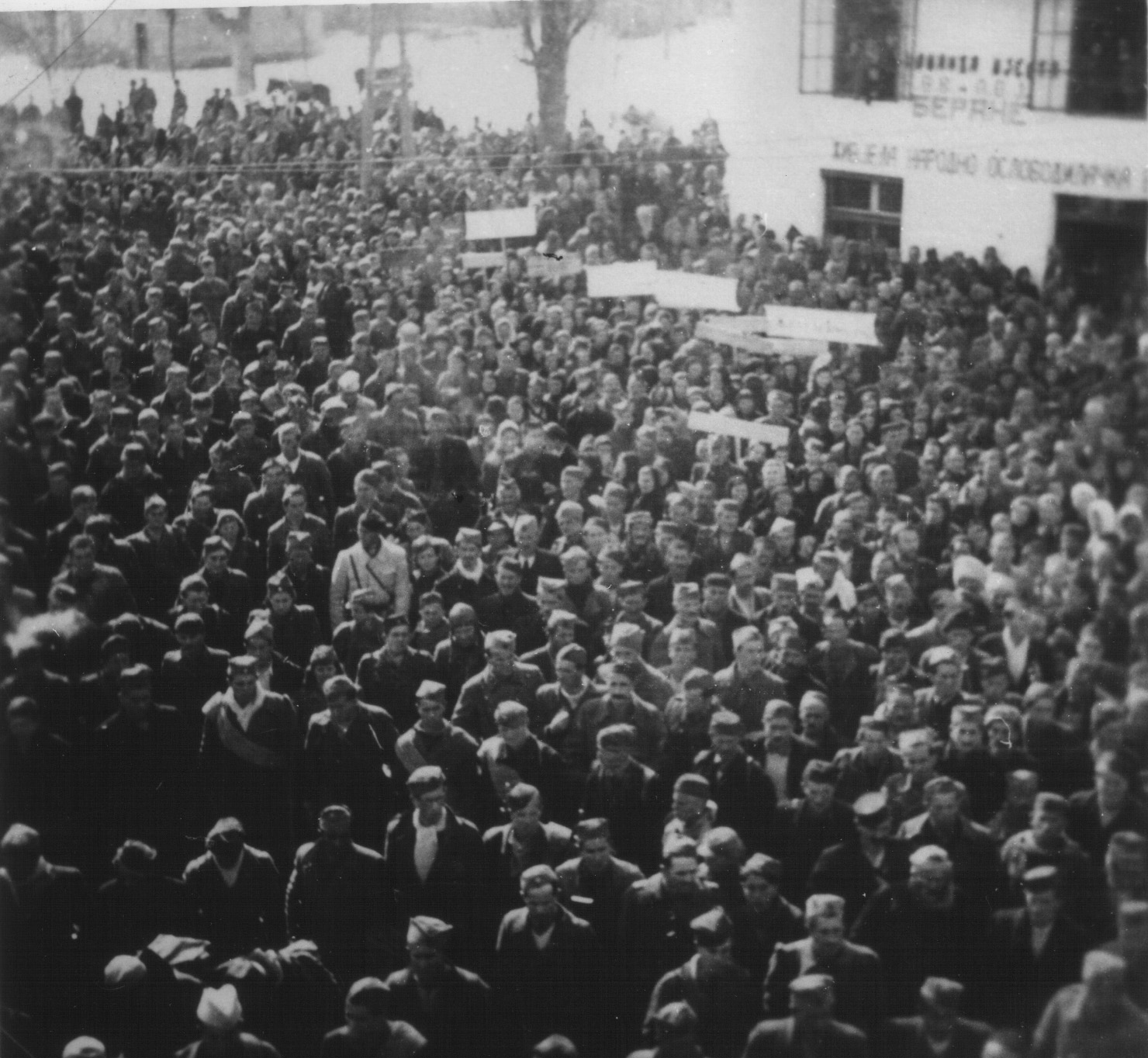
Great People's Assembly on the occasion of the establishment of the Eighth Montenegrin Brigade in Berane, 25 February 1944

In May, the Montenegrin branch of the Communist Party of Yugoslavia started preparations for an uprising planned for mid-July. The Communist Party and its Youth League organised 6,000 of its members into detachments prepared for guerrilla warfare. According to some historians, the first armed uprising in Nazi-occupied Europe happened on 13 July 1941 in Montenegro.

Unexpectedly, the uprising took hold, and by 20 July, 32,000 men and women had joined the fight. Except for the coast and major towns (Podgorica, Cetinje, Pljevlja, and Nikšić), which were besieged, Montenegro was mostly liberated. In a month of fighting, the Italian army suffered 5,000 dead, wounded, and captured. The uprising lasted until mid-August, when it was suppressed by a counter-offensive of 67,000 Italian troops brought in from Albania. Faced with new and overwhelming Italian forces, many of the fighters laid down their arms and returned home. Nevertheless, intense guerrilla fighting lasted until December.

Fighters who remained under arms fractured into two groups. Most of them went on to join the Yugoslav Partisans, consisting of communists and those inclined towards active resistance; these included Arso Jovanović, Sava Kovačević, Svetozar Vukmanović-Tempo, Milovan Đilas, Peko Dapčević, Vlado Dapčević, Veljko Vlahović, and Blažo Jovanović. Those loyal to the Karađorđević dynasty and opposing communism went on to become Chetniks, and turned to collaboration with Italians against the Partisans.

War broke out between Partisans and Chetniks during the first half of 1942. Pressured by Italians and Chetniks, the core of the Montenegrin Partisans went to Serbia and Bosnia, where they joined with other Yugoslav Partisans. Fighting between Partisans and Chetniks continued through the war. Chetniks with Italian backing controlled most of the country from mid-1942 to April 1943. Montenegrin Chetniks received the status of "anti-communist militia" and received weapons, ammunition, food rations, and money from Italy. Most of them were moved to Mostar, where they fought in the Battle of Neretva against the Partisans, but were dealt a heavy defeat.

During German operation Schwarz against the Partisans in May and June 1943, Germans disarmed many Chetniks without fighting, as they feared they would turn against them in case of an Allied invasion of the Balkans. After the capitulation of Italy in September 1943, Partisans managed to take hold of most of Montenegro for a brief time, but Montenegro was soon occupied by German forces, and fierce fighting continued during late 1943 and 1944. Montenegro was liberated by the Partisans in December 1944.

Montenegro became one of the six constituent republics of the communist Socialist Federal Republic of Yugoslavia (SFRY). Its capital became Podgorica, renamed Titograd in honour of President Josip Broz Tito. After the war, the infrastructure of Yugoslavia was rebuilt, industrialization began, and the University of Montenegro was established. Greater autonomy was established until the Socialist Republic of Montenegro ratified a new constitution in 1974.

=== Montenegro within FR Yugoslavia ===
After the formal dissolution of the SFRY in 1992, Montenegro remained part of a smaller Federal Republic of Yugoslavia along with Serbia. In the referendum on remaining in Yugoslavia in 1992, 96% of the votes cast were in favour of the federation with Serbia. The referendum was boycotted by opposition parties such as the Liberal Alliance of Montenegro, the Social Democratic and Socialist Parties, as well as minority parties such as the Democratic League in Montenegro, leading to a relatively low turnout of 66%.

Map of the disintegration of Yugoslavia until 2008

During the 1991–1995 Bosnian War and Croatian War, Montenegrin police and military forces, under orders of president Momir Bulatovic and Interior Minister Pavle Bulatovic joined Serbian troops in attacks on Dubrovnik, Croatia. These operations, aimed at acquiring more territory, were characterised by large-scale violations of human rights.

Montenegrin General Pavle Strugar was convicted for his part in the bombing of Dubrovnik. Bosnian refugees were arrested by Montenegrin police and transported to Serb camps in Foča, where they were subjected to systematic torture and executed.

In 1996, Milo Đukanović's government severed ties between Montenegro and its partner Serbia, which was led by Slobodan Milošević. Montenegro formed its own economic policy and adopted the German Deutsche Mark as its currency and subsequently adopted the euro, although not part of the Eurozone. Subsequent governments pursued pro-independence policies, and political tensions with Serbia simmered despite political changes in Belgrade.

Targets in Montenegro were bombed by NATO forces during Operation Allied Force in 1999, although the extent of these attacks was limited in both time and area affected.

In 2002, Serbia and Montenegro came to a new agreement for continued cooperation and entered into negotiations regarding the future status of the Federal Republic of Yugoslavia. This resulted in the Belgrade Agreement, which saw the country's transformation into a more decentralised state union named Serbia and Montenegro in 2003. The Belgrade Agreement also contained a provision delaying any future referendum on the independence of Montenegro for at least three years.

=== Independence ===
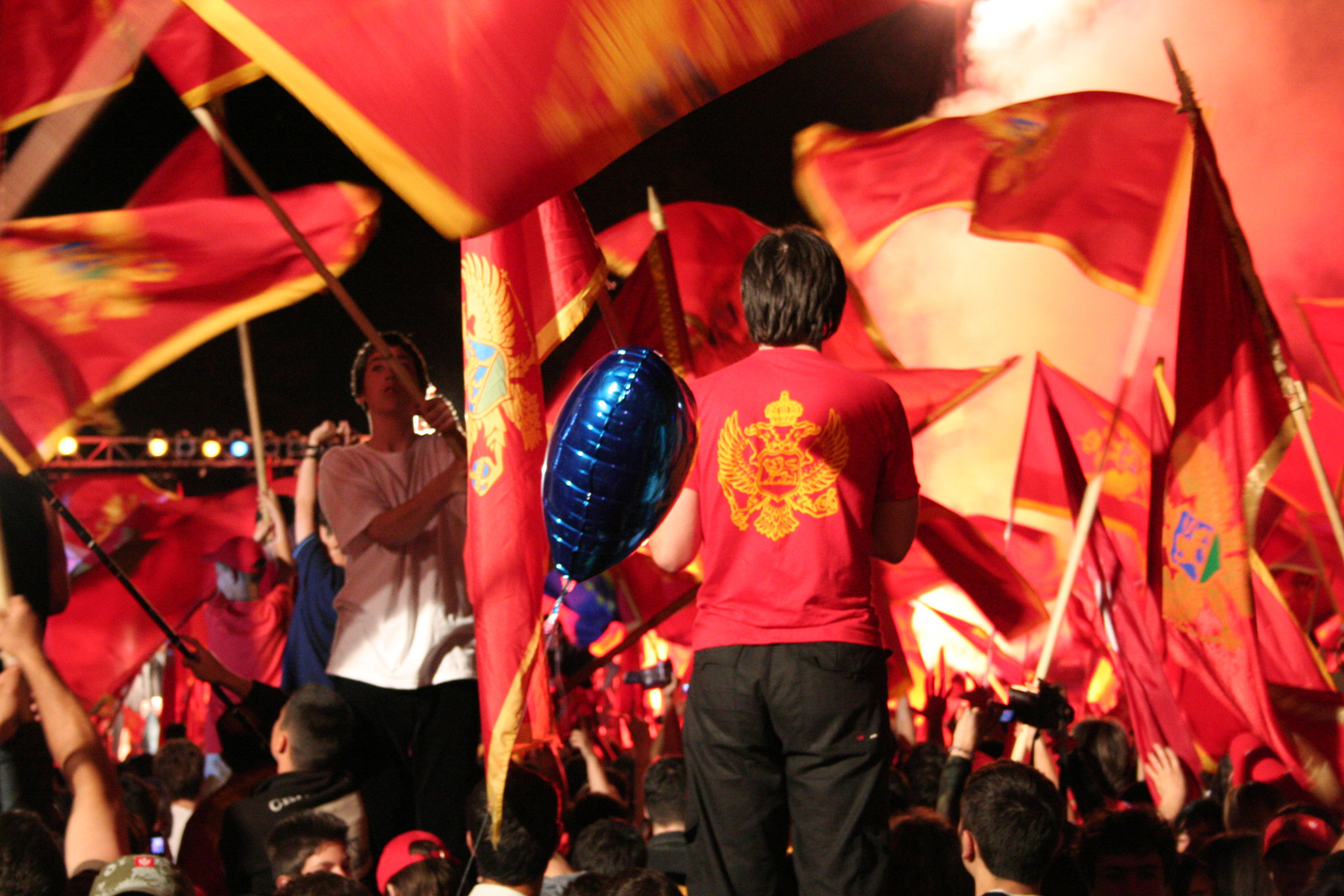
Supporters of Montenegrin independence in June 2006 in Cetinje

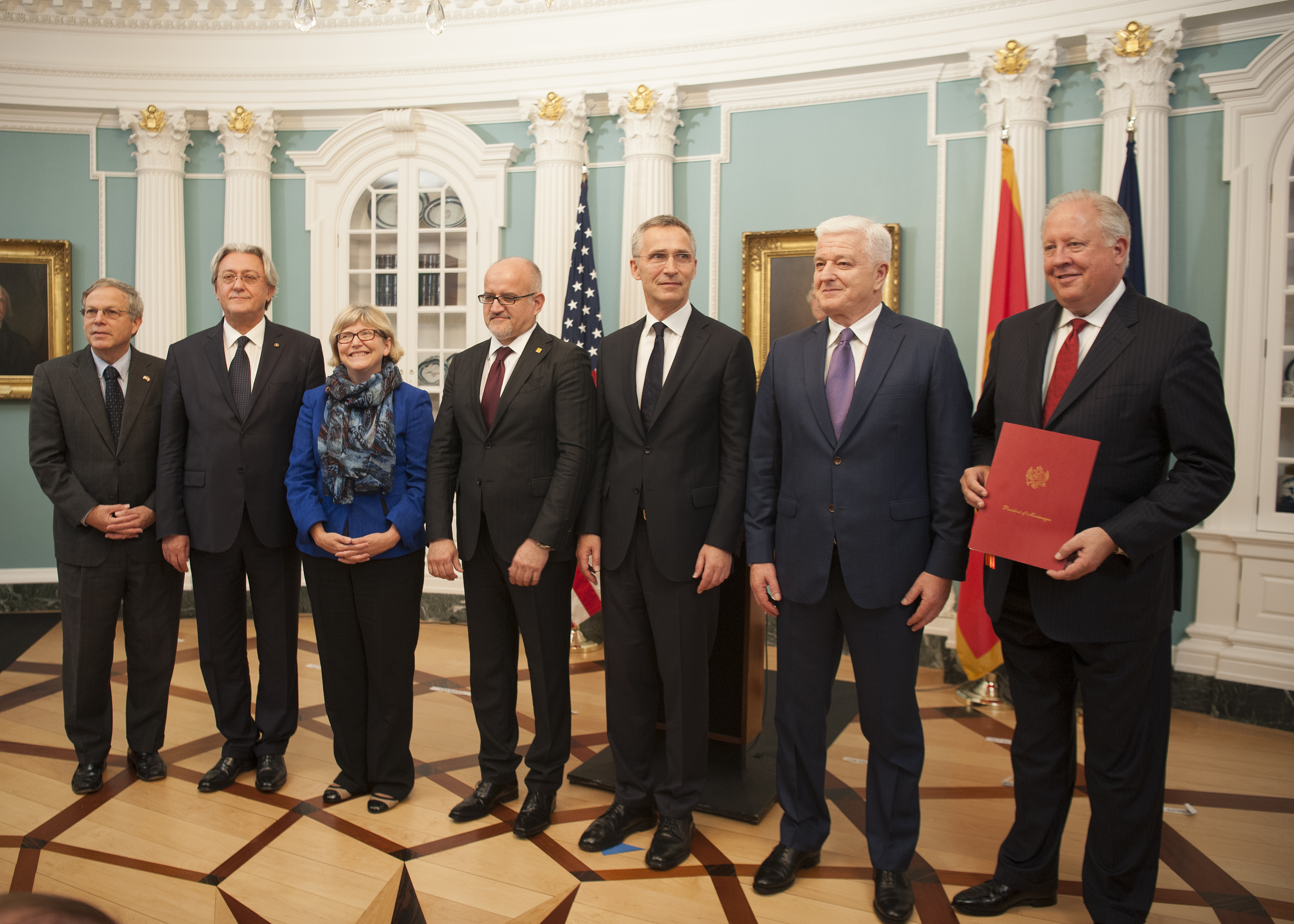
Montenegro Foreign Minister Srdjan Darmanović presents a document to US Undersecretary of State for Political Affairs Thomas Shannon and Montenegro Prime Minister Duško Marković during a ceremony at the State Department to accept Montenegro's instrument of accession to the North Atlantic Treaty Organization (NATO), 5 June 2017.

The status of the union between Montenegro and Serbia was decided by a referendum on Montenegrin independence on 21 May 2006. A total of 419,240 votes were cast, representing 86.5% of the electorate; 230,661 votes (55.5%) were for independence and 185,002 votes (44.5%) were against. This narrowly surpassed the 55% threshold needed to validate the referendum under the rules set by the European Union. According to the electoral commission, the 55% threshold was passed by only 2,300 votes. Serbia, the member-states of the European Union, and the permanent members of the United Nations Security Council all recognised Montenegro's independence.

The 2006 referendum was monitored by five international observer missions, headed by an OSCE/ODIHR team, and around 3,000 observers in total (including domestic observers from CDT (OSCE PA), the Parliamentary Assembly of the Council of Europe (PACE), the Congress of Local and Regional Authorities of the Council of Europe (CLRAE), and the European Parliament (EP) to form an International Referendum Observation Mission (IROM). The IROM—in its preliminary report—"assessed compliance of the referendum process with OSCE commitments, Council of Europe commitments, other international standards for democratic electoral processes, and domestic legislation." Furthermore, the report stated that the competitive pre-referendum environment was marked by an active and generally peaceful campaign and that "there were no reports of restrictions on fundamental civil and political rights".

On 3 June 2006, the Montenegrin Parliament declared the independence of Montenegro, formally confirming the result of the referendum.

On 28 June 2006, Montenegro joined the United Nations as its 192nd member state.

Montenegro has been dominated since the breakup of Yugoslavia by Milo Đukanović (four-time prime minister and twice president), accused of having established an authoritarian and clientelist regime, while maintaining close relations with organized crime. The massive privatizations of the Đukanović era lead to the enrichment of him and oligarchs close to him. His brother Aleksandar, owner of Montenegro's first private bank, oversaw the privatizations, while his sister, Ana Kolarevic, has long controlled the judiciary. The clientelist networks of the ruling party dominated all segments of social life. A party card was required to start a business or obtain a position in the administration. This policy also contributed to the reinforcement of regional disparities and social inequalities. Unemployment climbs to 36.6 per cent in the northern part of the country, compared to 3.9 per cent in the coastal region, while a quarter of the population lives below the poverty line (2018).

The Law on the Status of the Descendants of the Petrović Njegoš Dynasty was passed by the Parliament of Montenegro on 12 July 2011. It rehabilitated the Royal House of Montenegro and recognised limited symbolic roles within the constitutional framework of the republic.

In 2015, the investigative journalists' network OCCRP named Montenegro's long-time President and Prime Minister Milo Đukanović "Person of the Year in Organized Crime". The extent of Đukanović's corruption led to street demonstrations and calls for his removal.

In October 2016, for the day of the parliamentary election, a coup d'état was prepared by a group of persons that included leaders of the Montenegrin opposition, Serbian nationals and Russian agents; the coup was prevented. In 2017, fourteen people, including two Russian nationals and two Montenegrin opposition leaders, Andrija Mandić and Milan Knežević, were indicted for their alleged roles in the coup attempt on charges such as "preparing a conspiracy against the constitutional order and the security of Montenegro" and an "attempted terrorist act".

=== Recent history ===
Montenegro formally became a member of NATO in June 2017, despite attempts by Russia to sabotage it, an event that triggered a promise of retaliatory actions from Russia's government.

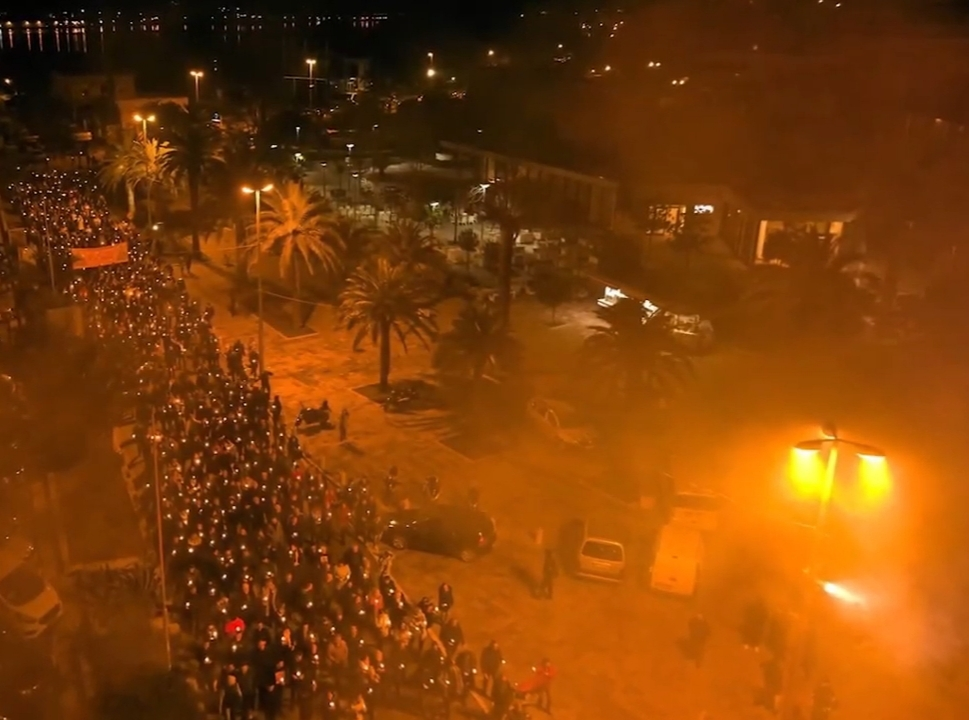
The controversial 2019 law on religious communities, introduced by the former ruling DPS, proposed the transfer of the majority of religious objects and land owned by the largest religious organization in the country, the Serbian Orthodox Church, to the Montenegrin state. It sparked a series of massive protests, which led to the first government change in the country's history.

Montenegro has been in negotiations with the EU since 2012. In 2018, the earlier goal of acceding by 2022 was revised to 2025. As of 2024, all 33 negotiation chapters had been opened, with three provisionally closed. Legislation is being passed bringing Montenegro law in line with EU membership requirements.

In April 2018, Milo Đukanović, the leader of the ruling Democratic Party of Socialists (DPS), won Montenegro's presidential election. The veteran politician had served as Prime Minister six times and as president once before. He had dominated Montenegrin politics since 1991.

Anti-corruption protests began in February 2019 against Đukanović and the Prime Minister Duško Marković-led government of the ruling Democratic Party of Socialists (DPS), which had been in power since 1991.

As of late December 2019, the newly adopted Law on Religion, which de jure transferred the ownership of church buildings and estates built before 1918 from the Serbian Orthodox Church to the Montenegrin state, sparked large protests and road blockages. Seventeen opposition Democratic Front MPs were arrested prior to the voting for disrupting the vote. Demonstrations continued into March 2020 as peaceful protest walks, mostly organised by the Serbian Orthodox Church in the majority of Montenegrin municipalities.

In its political rights and civil liberties worldwide report in May 2020, Freedom House marked Montenegro as a hybrid regime rather than a democracy because of declining standards in governance, justice, elections, and media freedom. For the first time in three decades, in the 2020 parliamentary election, the opposition won more votes than Đukanović's ruling party. In February 2022, that very same government was voted out in the first successful vote of no-confidence in the country's history.

In September 2022, an investigation linked six Russian diplomats with twenty eight Russian citizens holding temporary visas for Montenegro and two local citizens in a spy investigation. The diplomats were expelled. The Russian citizens were later banned from Montenegro and the two locals, one an ex-diplomat, face charges of illegal weapons, organising a criminal organisation and espionage.

In March 2023, Jakov Milatovic, a pro-western candidate of the Europe Now movement, won the presidential election run-off over incumbent Milo Đukanović to succeed him as the incumbent president of Montenegro. The Europe Now movement won the highest number of seats in the 2023 Montenegrin parliamentary election. On 31 October 2023, Milojko Spajic of the Europe Now Movement became Montenegro's new prime minister, leading a coalition of both pro-European and pro-Serb parties.

The Parliament of Montenegro in June 2024 adopted a resolution acknowledging the atrocities committed at the Jasenovac concentration camp during World War II. This decision, spearheaded by pro-Serbian factions, is viewed as a response to Montenegro's earlier support for a UN resolution on the Srebrenica genocide. Croatia has criticized the move, accusing Montenegro of politicizing historical events and warned that it could harm Montenegro's path to EU membership and bilateral relations between Croatia and Montenegro. The resolution has led to increased diplomatic tensions between the two nations.

In 2024, Montenegro was one of 22 countries with a Global Hunger Index score of less than 5.

== Geography ==
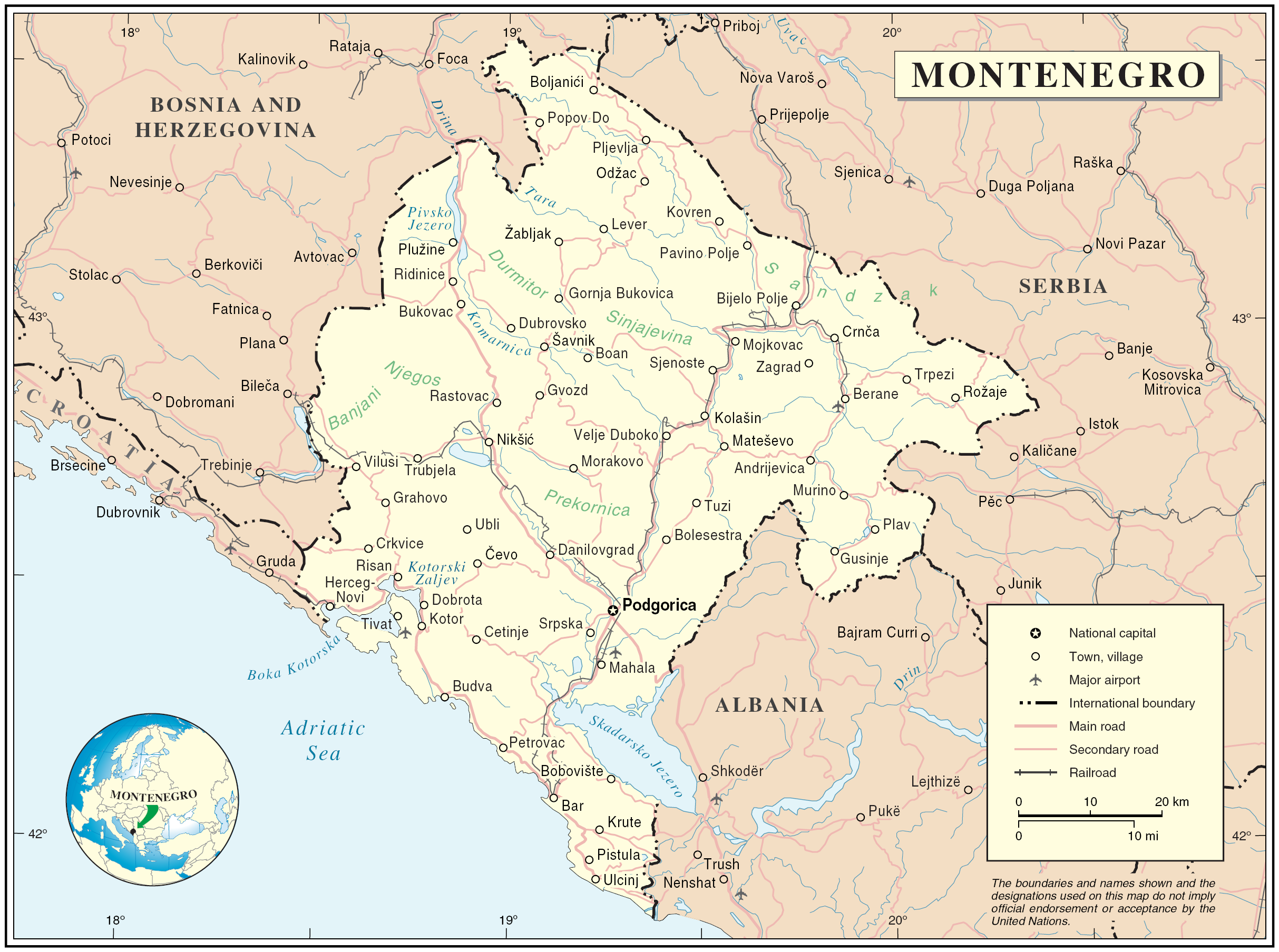
Map of Montenegro

Montenegro features high peaks along its borders with Albania, Bosnia and Herzegovina, Kosovo, and Serbia. Its geography also includes a segment of the karst of the western Balkan Peninsula, to a narrow coastal plain that is only 1.5 to 6 kilometres (1 to 4 miles) wide. The plain stops abruptly in the north, where Mount Lovćen and Mount Orjen plunge into the inlet of the Bay of Kotor.

Montenegro's large karst region lies generally at elevations of 1,000 metres (3,280 ft) above sea level; some parts, however, rise to 2,000 m (6,560 ft), such as Mount Orjen 1,894 metres (6,210 ft), the highest massif among the coastal limestone ranges. The Zeta River valley, at an elevation of 500 m (1,600 ft), is the lowest segment.

The mountains of Montenegro include some of the most rugged terrains in Europe, averaging more than 2,000 metres (6,600 feet) in elevation. One of the country's notable peaks is Bobotov Kuk in the Durmitor mountains, which reaches a height of 2,522 metres (8,270 ft) and was previously thought to be the country's highest point. In 2018, new triangulation measurements showed that Zla Kolata in the Prokletije mountains, which reaches a height of 2,534 metres (8,310 ft). Owing to the hyperhumid climate on their western sides, the Montenegrin mountain ranges were among the most ice-eroded parts of the Balkan Peninsula during the last glacial period.

Internationally, Montenegro borders Serbia, Bosnia and Herzegovina, Kosovo, Albania and Croatia. It lies between latitudes 41° and 44°N, and longitudes 18° and 21°E.

Montenegro has several national parks, making it important for its biodiversity. The national parks include Durmitor National Park (1952), a massif with an area of 390 square kilometres (39,000 ha) in the Dinaric Alps; the Biogradska Gora National Park (1952), a forest with 54 square kilometres (5,400 ha), the park was recognised as one of the UNESCO World Network of Biosphere Reserves; Lovćen National Park (1952) is located in southwestern Montenegro, it is the inspiration behind the names of Montenegro and Crna Gora, the area is 64 square kilometres (6,400 ha); Lake Skadar National Park (1983) is a big lake lying on the Albania-Montenegro border, the national park measure approximately 400 square kilometres (40,000 ha); and Prokletije National Park (2009) is a mountain range including the second tallest mountain of Montenegro, the park has an area of 166 square kilometres (16,600 ha).

Montenegro is a member of the International Commission for the Protection of the Danube River, as more than 2,000 km^{2} (772 sq mi) of the country's territory lie within the Danube catchment area.

=== Biodiversity ===
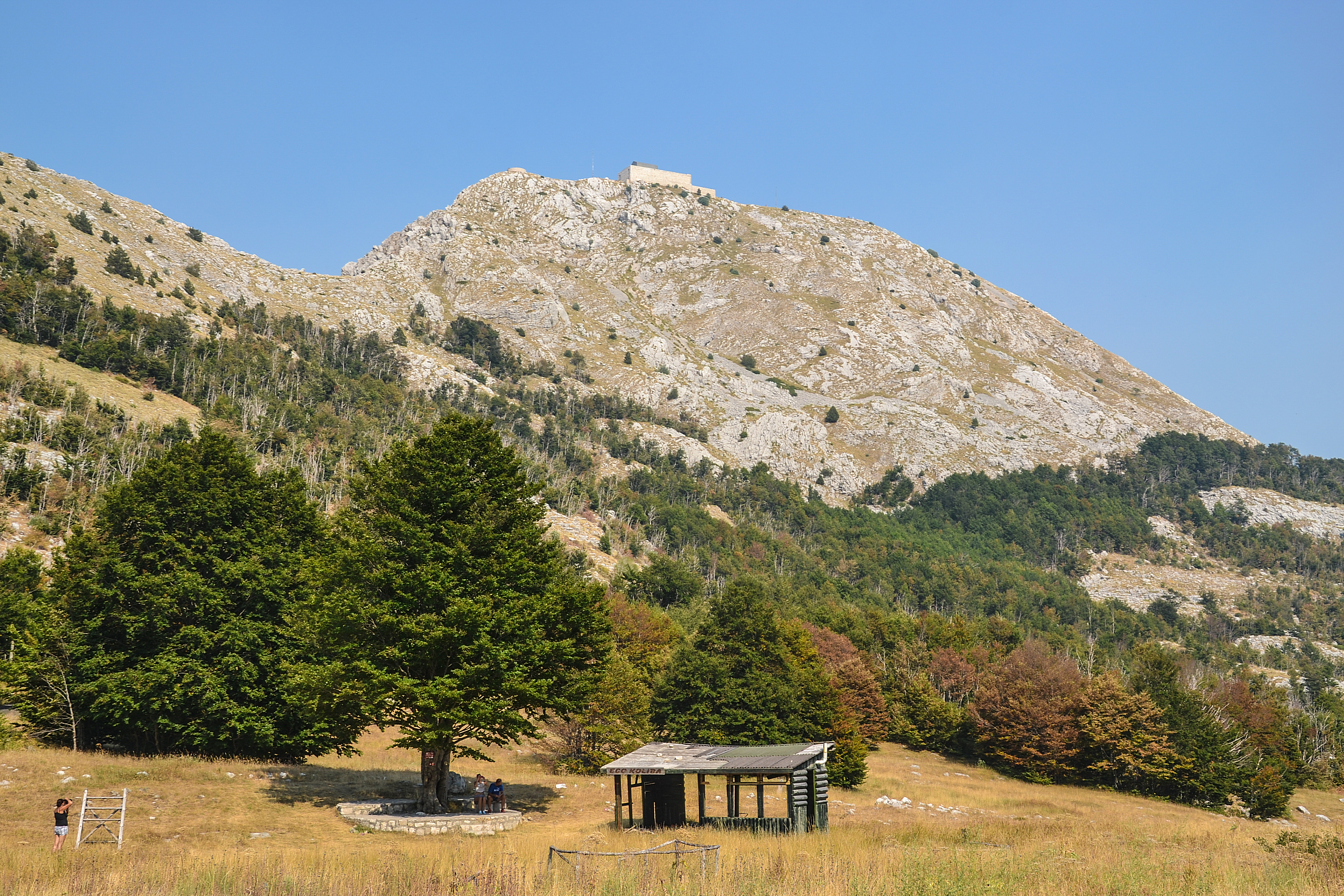
Lovćen, southern region of Montenegro

The diversity of the geological base, landscape, climate, and soil, and the position of Montenegro on the Balkan Peninsula and Adriatic Sea, created the conditions for high biological diversity, putting Montenegro among the "hot-spots" of European and world biodiversity. The number of species per area unit index in Montenegro is 0.837, the highest in any European country.

Biological estimates suggest that over 1,200 species of freshwater algae, 300 species of marine algae, 589 species of moss, 7,000–8,000 species of vascular plants, 2,000 species of fungi, 16,000–20,000 species of insects, 407 species of marine fish, 56 species of reptile, 333 species of regularly visiting birds and a high species diversity of mammals are found in Montenegro.

Montenegro can be divided into two main biogeographic regions, which include the Mediterranean Biogeographic Region and the Alpine Biogeographic Region. It is also home to three terrestrial ecoregions: Balkan mixed forests, Dinaric Mountains mixed forests, and Illyrian deciduous forests. It had a 2019 Forest Landscape Integrity Index mean score of 6.41/10, ranking it 73rd globally out of 172 countries.

The total share of protected areas in Montenegro is 9.05% of the country's area, which mainly comes from the five national parks of Montenegro.

== Politics ==
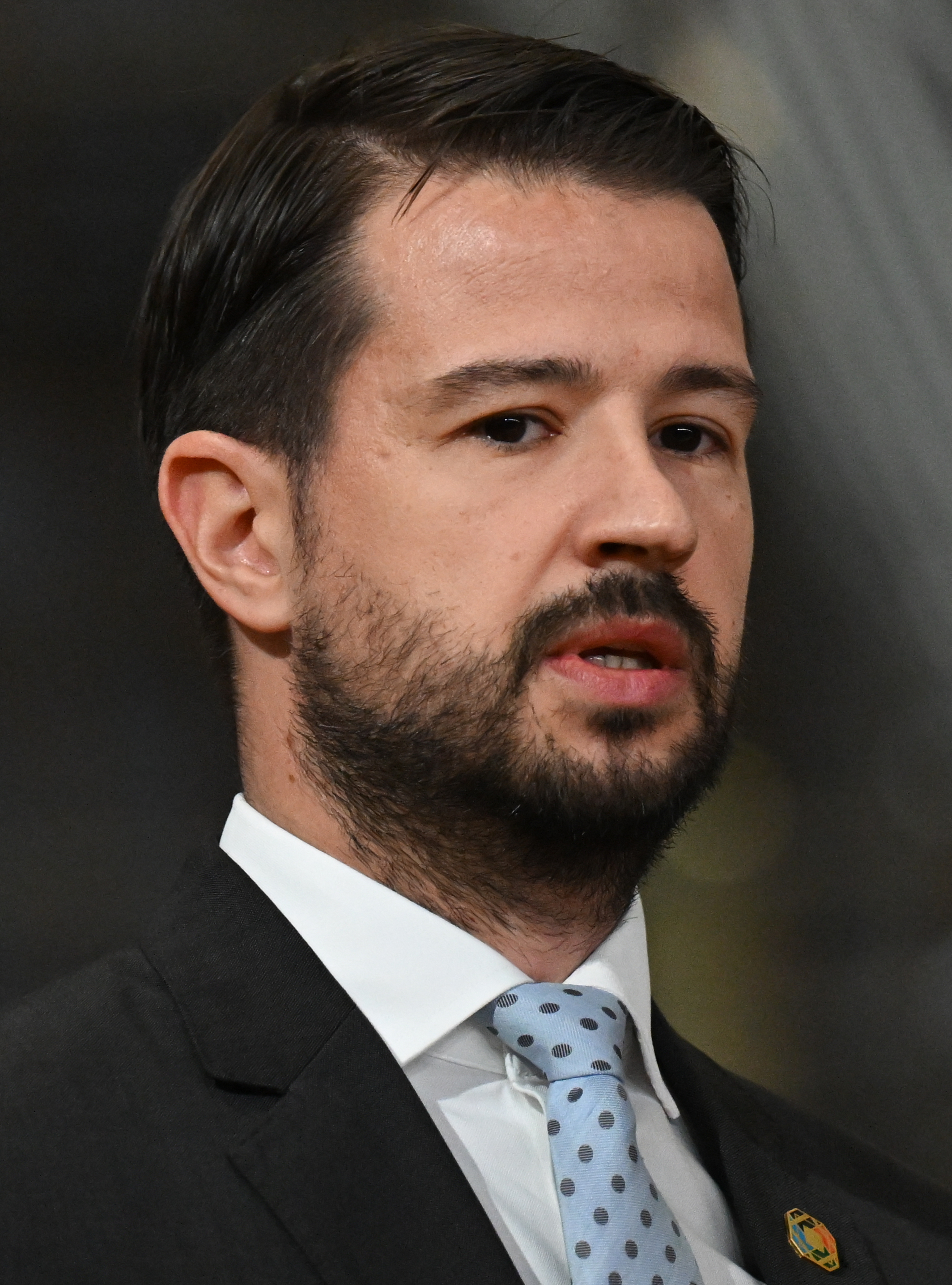
Jakov Milatović
President
since 20 May 2023

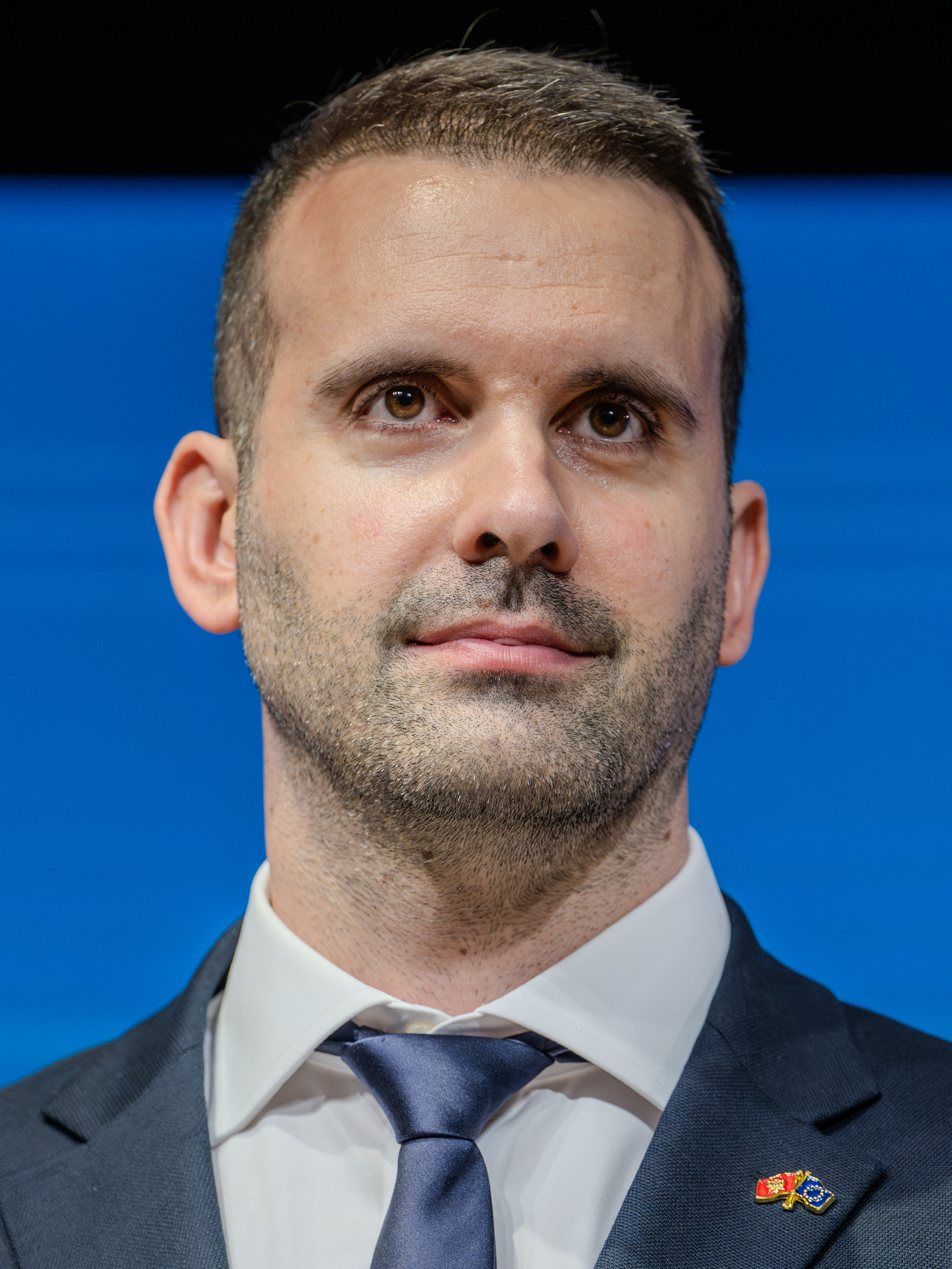
Milojko Spajić
Prime Minister
since 31 October 2023

Montenegro is a parliamentary representative democratic republic with a codified constitution established in 2007. The constitution describes Montenegro as a "civic, democratic, ecological state of social justice, based on the reign of Law". Montenegro is a multi-party system.

The President of Montenegro is the representative head of state, elected for a period of five years through direct election. The President promotes the country internationally through diplomatic engagements, promulgates laws by ordinance, calls elections for the Parliament, and ceremonially proposes candidates for Prime Minister, president and justices of the Constitutional Court to the Parliament. The President also ceremonially proposes the calling of a referendum to Parliament, grants amnesty for criminal offences proscribed by the national law, confers decoration and awards and performs other constitutional duties and is a member of the Supreme Defence Council. The official residence of the President is in Cetinje. The incumbent president is Jakov Milatović who has held the position since May 2023.

The Government of Montenegro is the executive branch of government authority of Montenegro and led by the Prime Minister. The role of Prime Minister is the most politically powerful office in Montenegro. All of Montenegro's governments since 2006 have been coalitions comprising a minimum of three political parties. The government is primarily based in Podgorica.

The Parliament of Montenegro is the country's unicameral legislature, located in Podgorica. The Parliament has power to appoint the government, pass legislation (parliamentary law) and scrutinise bills (proposed parliamentary law). It also appoints justices of all courts, approves the budget and performs other duties as established by the country's Constitution. Parliament can pass a motion of no confidence in the Government by simple majority vote. One member of the Montenegrin parliament, known as a Deputy, is elected per 6,000 voters. There are currently 81 deputies. Elections to the Parliament are conducted by the D'Hondt method, a form of proportional representation.

According to International IDEA's Global State of Democracy (GSoD) Indices and Democracy Tracker, Montenegro performs in the mid-range on overall democratic measures, with particular weaknesses in absence of corruption and judicial independence. In 2019, Montenegro was described as a hybrid regime (a political system which combines democratic and authoritarian features) according to the United States–based Freedom House. The organisation cited state capture, abuse of power, and strongman tactics by Prime Minister Milo Đukanović (2008–2010 and 2012–2016) as explanations for its description as such. Đukanović held a number of senior government positions, including the Presidency, before and after the dissolution of the union between Serbia and Montenegro. Similarly the Economist Democracy Index (EDI) considers Montenegro to be a "flawed democracy": since it was first published, the EDI ranked Montenegro as a "flawed democracy" from 2006–2015, downgrading it to a "hybrid regime" between 2016–2020, before reinstating it to "flawed democracy" in 2021 where, as of 2024, it remains.

Đukanović's pro-European and pro-NATO Democratic Party of Socialists (DPS) narrowly lost the 2020 parliamentary election which ended the party's 30-year rule and the pro-Serbia "For the Future of Montenegro" (ZBCG) parliamentary group, composed mainly of Serb nationalist parties, formed a government under Prime Minister Zdravko Krivokapic. Prime Minister Krivokapic's government was toppled in a no-confidence vote after just 14 months in power.

In April 2022, a new minority government, led by Prime Minister Dritan Abazović, brought together moderate parties that are both pro-European and pro-Serb. However, his government lost a confidence vote after only 113 days. Since Montenegro had been unable to find a government which could command the confidence of the Parliament, Abazović remained in his post until the Spajić Cabinet had been formed after the Parliamentary election which took place on 11 June 2023, where the Europe Now! party led by Milojko Spajić won the most seats. In October 2023, a new minority government with confidence and supply support from ZBCG enabled Milojko Spajić to become the new prime minister.

=== Administrative divisions ===
Municipalities and Statistical regions of Montenegro

Montenegro is divided into twenty-five municipalities (opština). Each municipality can contain multiple cities and towns. Historically, the territory of the country was divided into nahije and during the beginning of SR Montenegro was divided into counties (srez).

Regions of Montenegro—designed for statistical purposes by the Statistical Office—have no administrative function. Other organizations (e.g. Football Association of Montenegro) use different municipalities as a part of similar regions.

- Northern Region

Municipality	Area		Population	
Municipality	Km^{2}	Rank	Total	Rank
Andrijevica	283	12	5,117	10
Berane	544	6	28,305	3
Bijelo Polje	924	2	46,676	1
Gusinje	486	8	13,108	6
Kolašin	897	3	8,420	8
Mojkovac	367	11	8,669	7
Petnjica	173	13	6,686	9
Plav	486	7	13,549	5
Plužine	854	4	3,286	12
Pljevlja	1,346	1	31,060	2
Rožaje	432	10	23,312	4
Šavnik	553	5	2,077	13
Žabljak	445	9	3,599	11

- Central Region

Municipality	Area		Population	
Municipality	Km^{2}	Rank	Total	Rank
Cetinje	899	3	16,757	4
Danilovgrad	501	4	17,678	3
Nikšić	2,065	1	72,824	2
Podgorica	1,399	2	187,085	1
Tuzi	236	5	12,096	5

- Coastal Region

Municipality	Area		Population	
Municipality	Km^{2}	Rank	Total	Rank
Bar	598	1	42,368	1
Budva	122	5	19,170	5
Herceg Novi	235	4	30,992	2
Kotor	335	2	22,799	3
Tivat	46	6	14,111	6
Ulcinj	255	3	20,265	4

=== Foreign relations ===
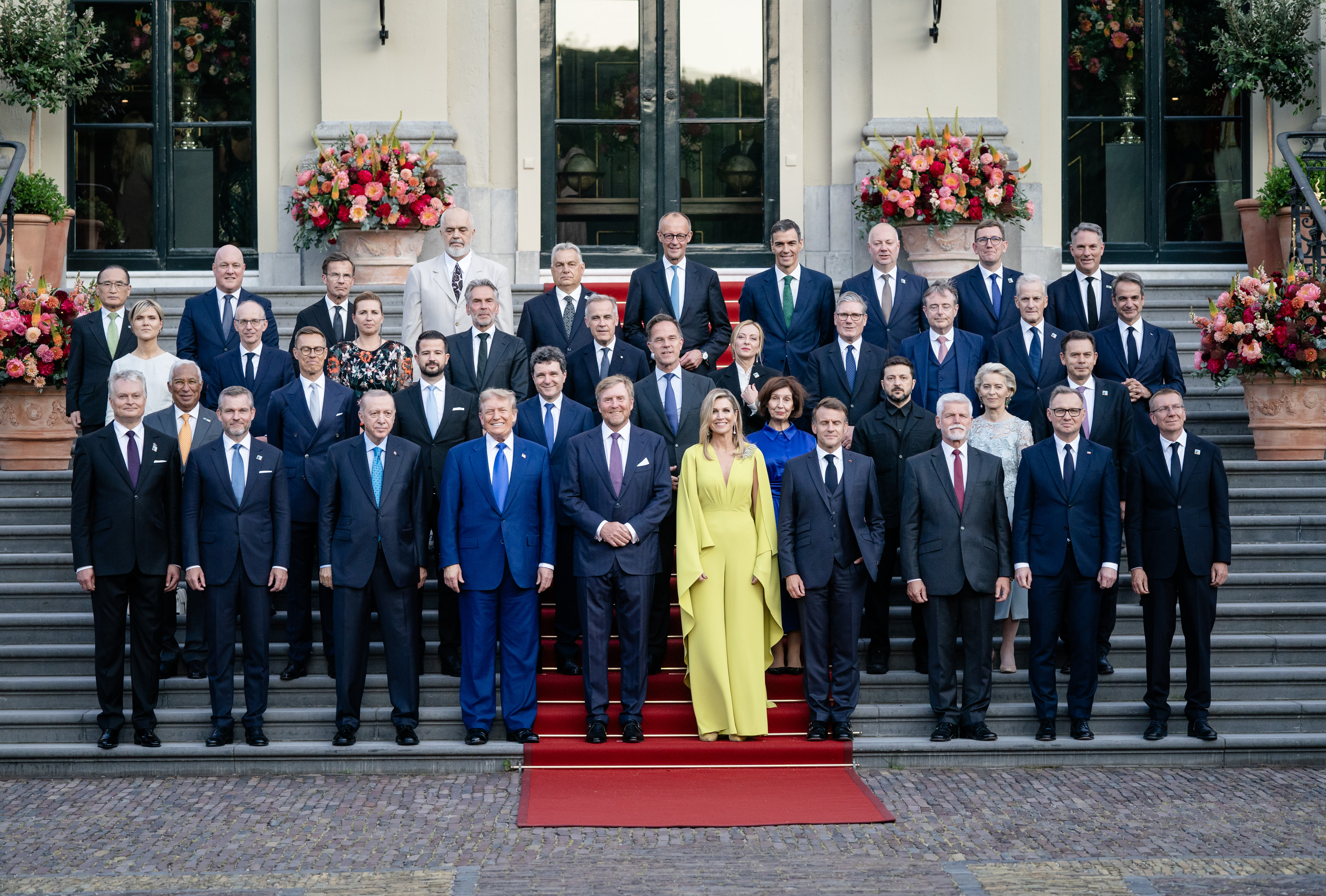
President of Montenegro Jakov Milatović at the North Atlantic Treaty Organization Summit held in The Hague, Netherlands, on 24–25 June 2025. Montenegro became a member of NATO 5 June 2017.

The Ministry of Foreign Affairs was given the task of defining the foreign policy priorities and activities needed for their implementation in cooperation with other state administration authorities, the President, the Speaker of the Parliament, and other relevant stakeholders.

The country joined NATO on 5 June 2017. Integration into the European Union remains a high-priority for Montenegro and has been the focus of Montenegrin foreign policy since its independence from Serbia. In June 2023, newly elected President Milatović stated that he expects Montenegro to join the European Union by 2027 or 2028.

In April 2026, the EU Ambassadors in Brussels approved the start of preparations for the accession agreement for Montenegro to the Union.

=== Law ===
The current Constitution of Montenegro was ratified and adopted by the Constitutional Parliament of Montenegro on 19 October 2007 in a session by achieving the required two-thirds supermajority of votes. It was officially proclaimed on 22 October 2007.

The Constitution defines Montenegro as a civic, democratic and environmentally friendly country with social justice, established by the sovereign rights of its government.

The judiciary in Montenegro is composed of several courts, with the Supreme Court being the highest judicial authority. It oversees the uniform application of laws. Administrative Courts handle disputes related to public administration. The judiciary also includes Basic Courts (for minor civil and criminal cases), High Courts (for more serious cases and appeals), and the Appellate Court for reviewing lower court decisions.

The Constitutional Court of Montenegro is a separate body, tasked with safeguarding the constitution by reviewing laws and acts of public authorities to ensure their compliance with the Constitution.

Judges in Montenegro are appointed by the Judicial Council and serve until the age of 67. The President of Montenegro appoints judges upon the recommendation of the Judicial Council. Additionally, the Protector of Human Rights and Freedoms of Montenegro (Ombudsman) is appointed by the Parliament for a six-year term, ensuring the protection of human rights and social justice.

Discrimination on the basis of both sexual orientation and gender identity is banned in employment, the provision of goods and services, education and health services. Montenegro also possesses hate crime and hate speech laws which include sexual orientation and gender identity as grounds of non-discrimination. Since 15 July 2021, same-sex couples may register their relationship as a Life Partnership.

=== Law enforcement, security and emergency services ===
Law enforcement in Montenegro is carried out by several agencies under the Ministry of Interior. Civil law enforcement in Montenegro is primarily the responsibility of the Police Directorate, the national police force. Municipal police, known as Communal Police, enforce local laws in their respective municipalities.

Law enforcement in Montenegro is carried out by several agencies under the Ministry of Interior. The primary law enforcement body is the Montenegrin Police Directorate, responsible for crime investigation, maintaining public order, and general law enforcement. The Municipal Police assist with local law enforcement tasks, primarily focusing on traffic regulation and minor public order issues. Private security firms operate in Montenegro but have no legal authority to arrest or detain suspects.

The National Security Agency (ANB) is responsible for counterintelligence and internal security, while Interpol Montenegro collaborates with international agencies to counter transnational crime. Special units within the police, such as the Special Anti-Terrorist Unit (SAJ), handle organized crime, terrorism, and high-risk operations.

An agreement signed with the EU effective July 2023 permits EU Frontex border management personnel to operate in Montenegro in support of local border police operating on other, non EU, borders in Montenegro.

Emergency services in Montenegro include medical services, firefighters, and search and rescue units, which are coordinated by the Directorate for Emergency Situations. Emergency medical services are operated by local health institutions but are overseen by the Ministry of Health.

=== Military ===
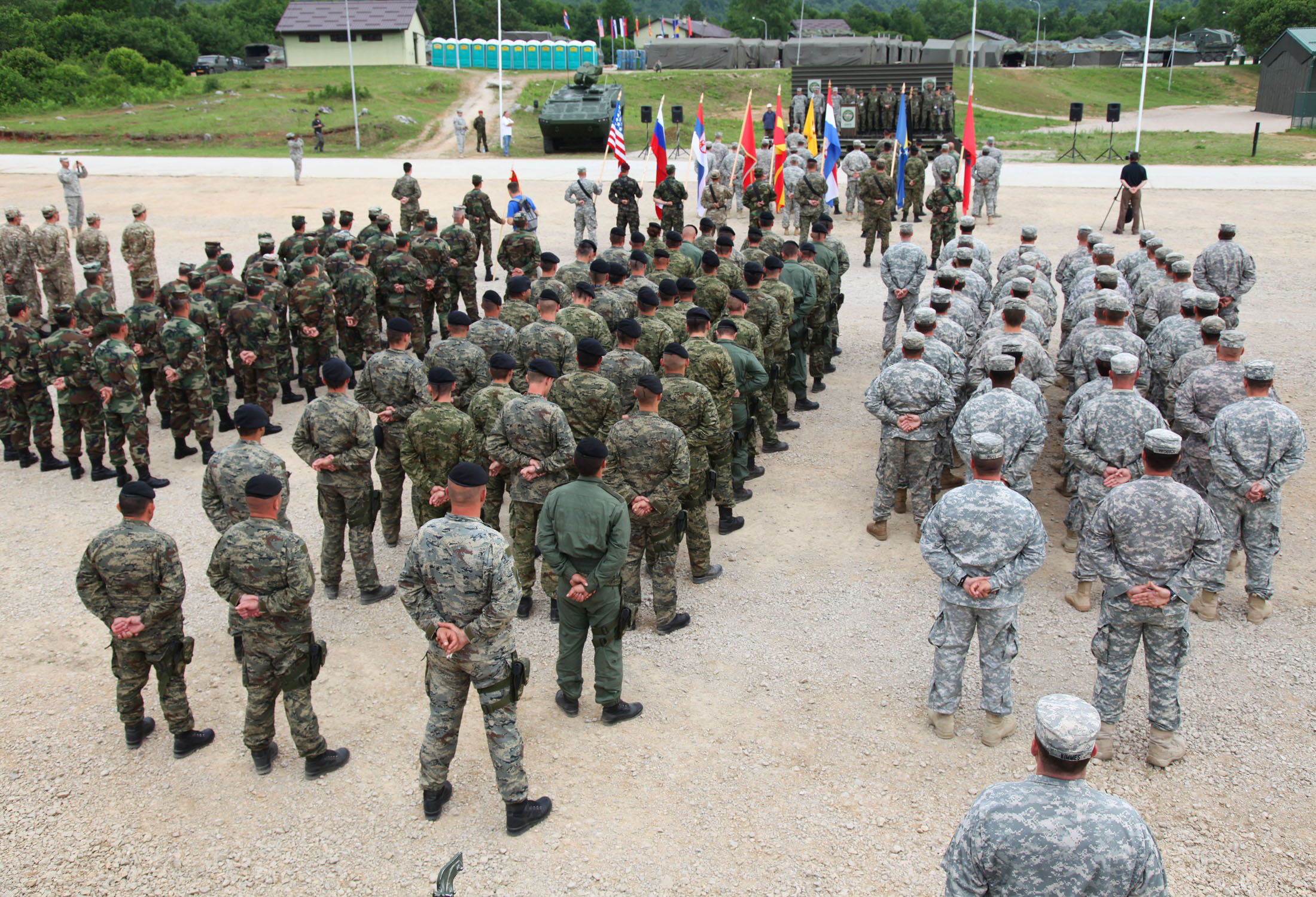
Montenegrin army soldiers with NATO allies in Slunj, Croatia

The military of Montenegro consist of three professional service branches: the Montenegrin Ground Army, the Montenegrin Navy and the Montenegrin Air Force. The armed forces of Montenegro are managed by the Ministry of Defence, and controlled by the Chief of the General Staff. The President of Montenegro is the Commander-in-Chief of the armed forces, to whom members of the forces swear an oath of allegiance. The Armed Forces are charged with protecting Montenegro, promoting the global security interests and supporting international peacekeeping efforts.

Montenegro is a NATO member and a member of Adriatic Charter. The government planned to have the army participate in peacekeeping missions through the UN and NATO such as the International Security Assistance Force.

Montenegro is the 35th most peaceful country in the world, according to the 2024 Global Peace Index.

== Economy ==
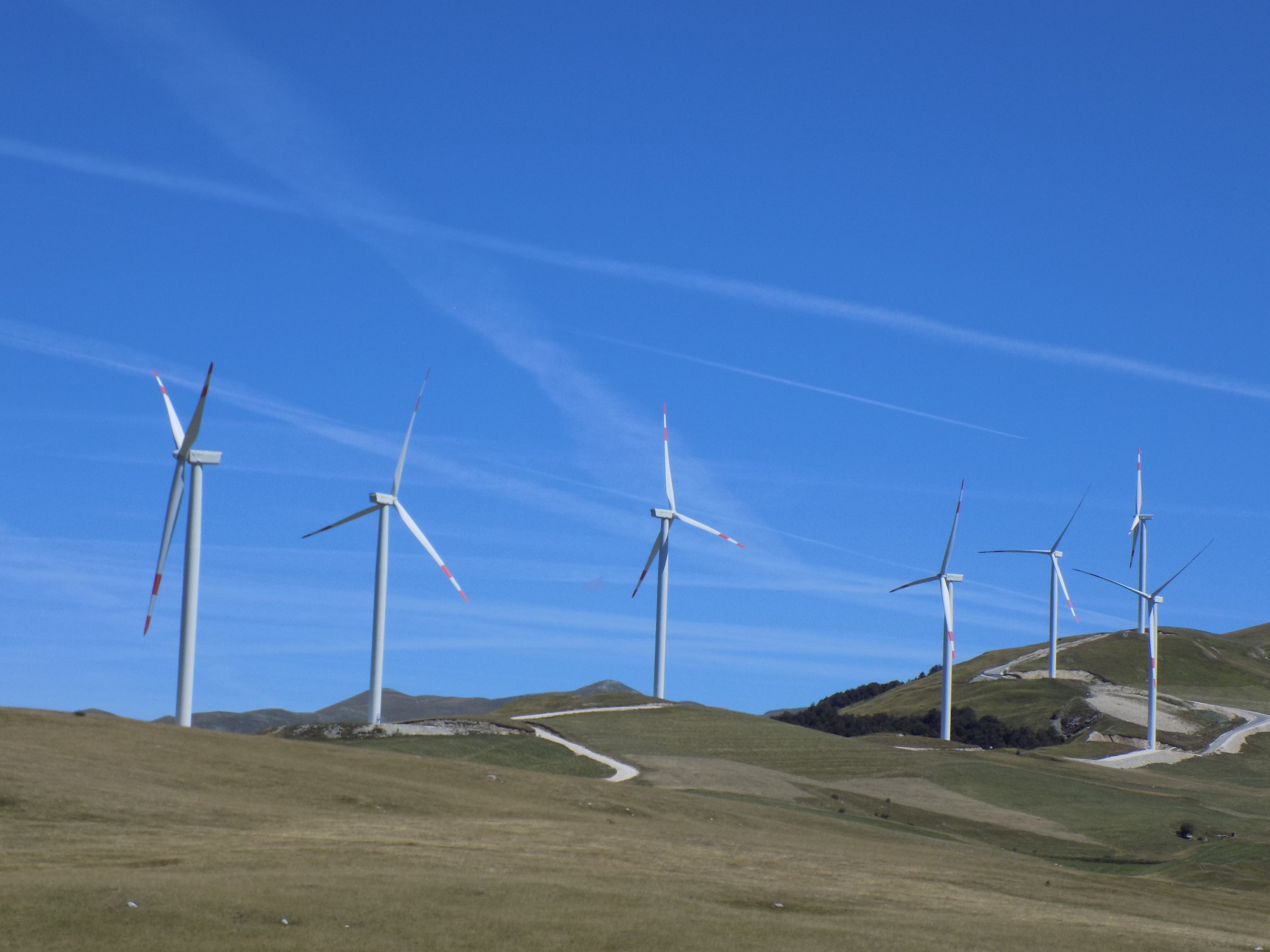
Krnovo Wind farm

The economy of Montenegro is mostly service-based and is in late transition to a market economy. According to the International Monetary Fund, the nominal GDP of Montenegro was $5.424 billion in 2019. The GDP PPP for 2019 was $12.516 billion, or $20,083 per capita. According to Eurostat data, the Montenegrin GDP per capita stood at 48% of the EU average in 2018.

Montenegro joined the Central European Free Trade Agreement in 2007 and has a free trade agreement with the European Free Trade Association since 2012. The Central Bank of Montenegro is not part of the euro system but the country is "euroised", using the euro unilaterally as its currency. Montenegro was ranked 64th in the Global Innovation Index in 2025, up from 75th in 2023.

=== Infrastructure ===
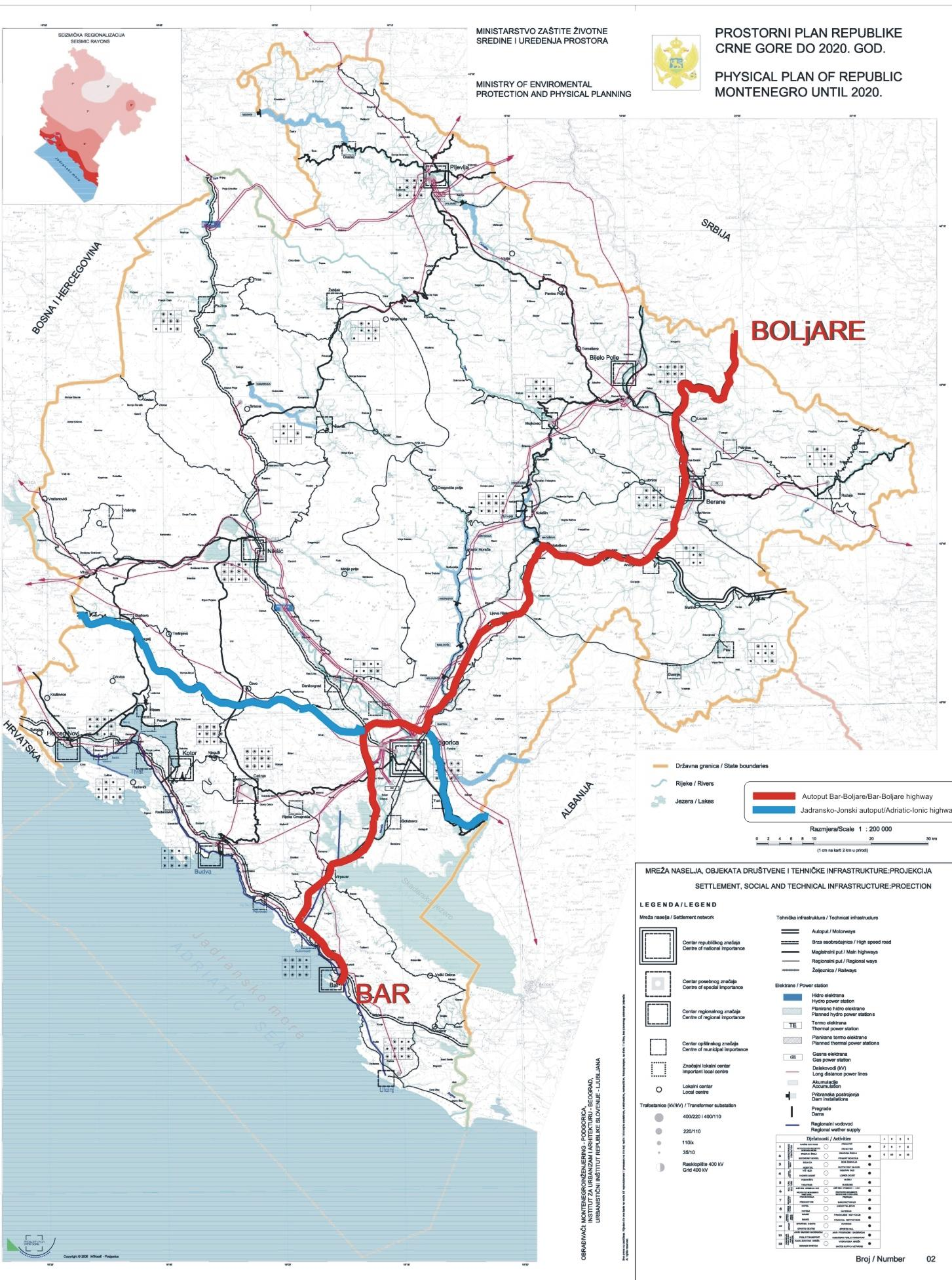
Roads of Montenegro in service and planned

The Montenegrin road infrastructure is not at Western European standards. No roads meet full motorway standards. Construction of new motorways is considered a national priority, as they are important for uniform economic development and the development of Montenegro as an attractive tourist destination.

The European routes that pass through Montenegro are E65 and E80.

The backbone of the Montenegrin rail network is the Belgrade–Bar railway, which provides international connection towards Serbia. A domestic branch line, the Nikšić-Podgorica railway, operated as a freight-only line for decades, that opened for passenger traffic after reconstruction and electrification in 2012. The other branch line from Podgorica towards the Albanian border, the Podgorica–Shkodër railway, is not in use.

Montenegro has two international airports, Podgorica Airport and Tivat Airport.

The Port of Bar is Montenegro's main seaport. Initially built in 1906, the port was almost completely destroyed during World War II. Reconstruction began in 1950. It is equipped to handle over five million tons of cargo annually, but has been operating at a loss and well below capacity. The reconstruction of the Belgrade-Bar railway and the proposed Belgrade-Bar motorway are expected to return operating levels to capacity.

In 2023 there is a plan to install an LNG terminal at Bar to receive gas imports.

=== Tourism ===
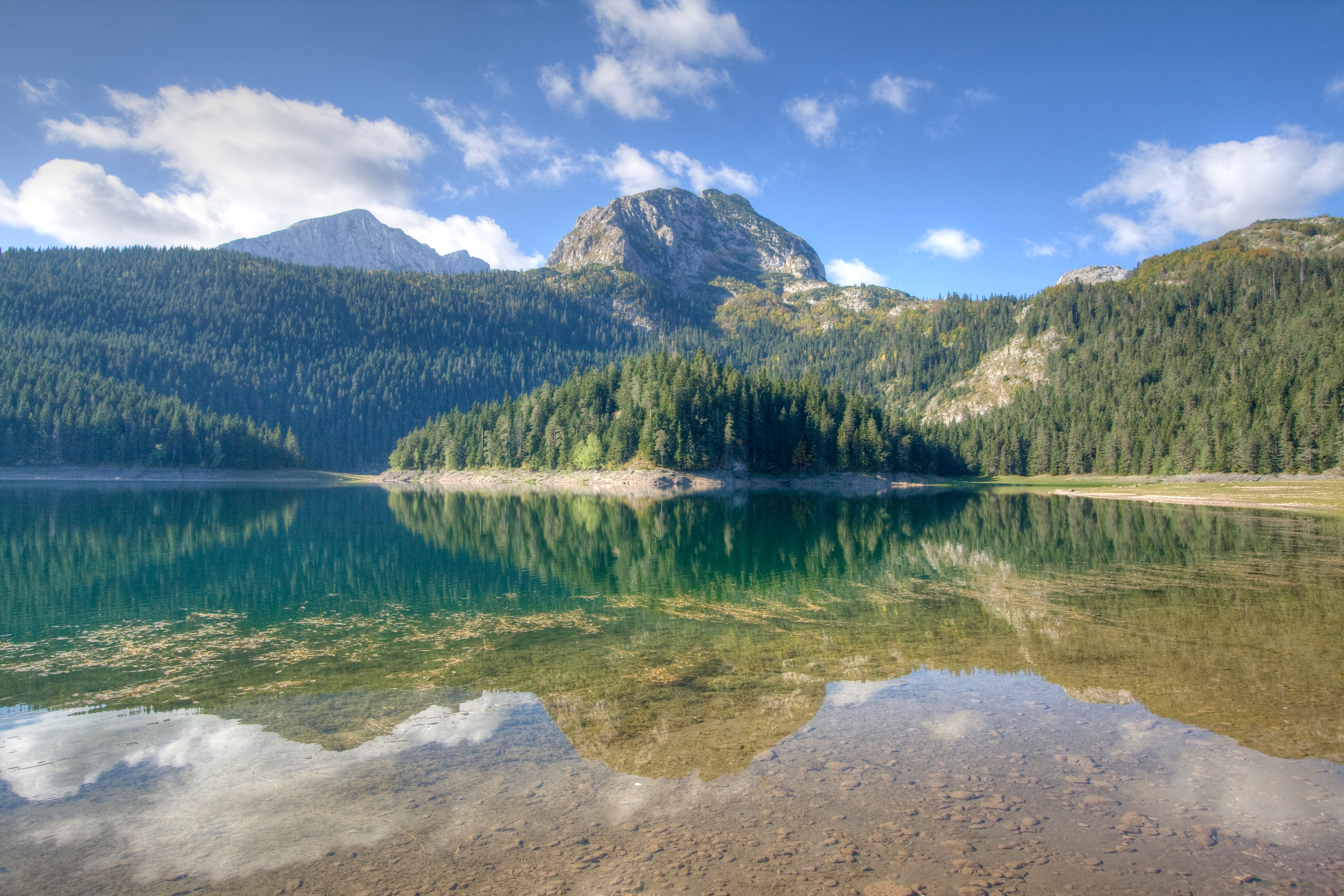
The Black Lake in Durmitor National Park, a World Heritage Site

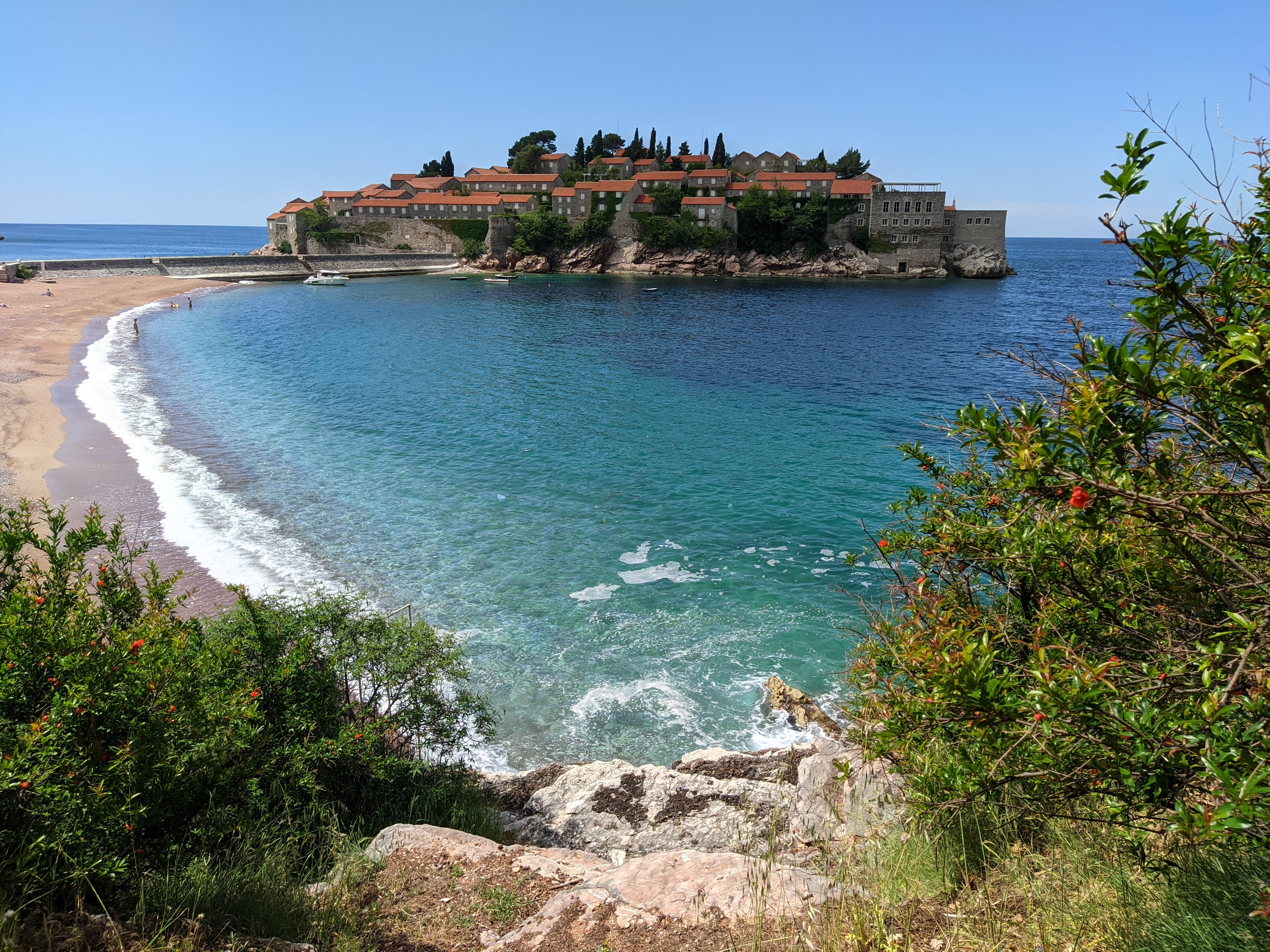
Sveti Stefan

A total of 2.1 million visitors visited Montenegro in 2022 spending 12.4m nights there. The majority of foreign visitors to Montenegro come from the neighbouring countries of Serbia, Bosnia and Herzegovina and Kosovo, as well as Russia.

The Montenegrin Adriatic coast is 295 km (183 mi) long, with 72 km (45 mi) of beaches and many well-preserved ancient towns. Some of the most popular beaches include Jaz Beach, Mogren Beach, Bečići Beach, Sveti Stefan Beach and Velika Plaža. Meanwhile, some of the most popular ancient towns include Herceg Novi, Perast, Kotor, Budva and Ulcinj.

National Geographic Traveler (edited once a decade) ranks Montenegro among the "50 Places of a Lifetime". Montenegrin seaside town Sveti Stefan was once used as the cover for the magazine. The coast region of Montenegro was considered one of the great "discoveries" among world tourists. In January 2010, The New York Times ranked the Ulcinj South Coast region of Montenegro, including Velika Plaža, Ada Bojana, and the Hotel Mediteran of Ulcinj, among the "Top 31 Places to Go in 2010" as part of a worldwide ranking.

== Demographics ==
=== Ethnic structure ===
The 2023 census reported 623,633 citizens. Montenegro is a multiethnic state with no ethnic majority. Montenegrins make up 41.1% of the population, Serbs 32.9%, Bosniaks 9.45%, Albanians 4.99%, and Russians 2.01%. There is a significant number of other ethnic groups, including Romani people, Croats, Ukrainians, Belarusians, and Turks.

=== Languages ===
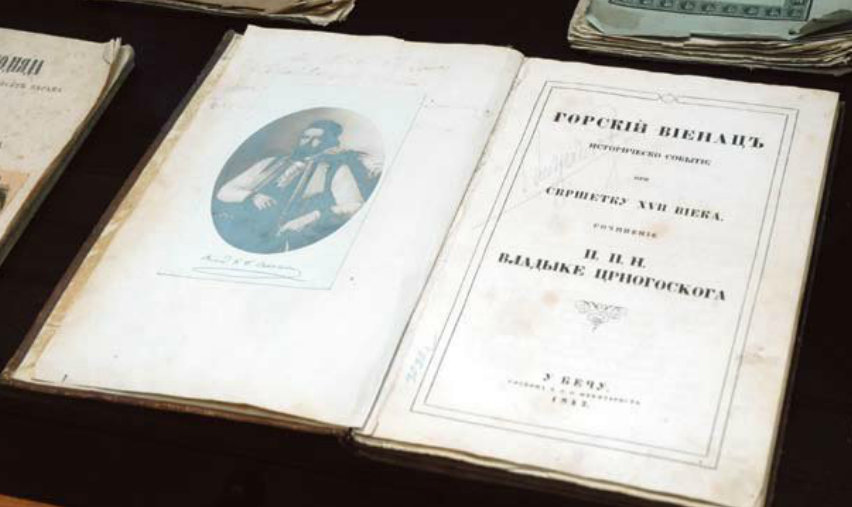
The Mountain Wreath is a poetic chronicle documenting the struggle of the Montenegrin people for independence from the Ottoman Empire, and is the most famous literary work in the country.

The official language in Montenegro is Montenegrin. Serbian, Bosnian, Albanian, and Croatian are recognised in official usage. Montenegrin, Serbian, Bosnian, and Croatian are mutually intelligible as standard varieties of the Serbo-Croatian language. Serbian is the most spoken language in the country, as a plurality of the population at 43.18% consider it as their native language, while 34.52% speaks the Montenegrin language. There is also significant number of people speaking Bosnian (6.98%), Albanian (5.25%), and Russian (2.36%).

=== Religion ===
Montenegro has historically stood at the crossroads of multiculturalism, and over centuries this has shaped its unique co-existence between its Christian and Muslim populations. Montenegrins have throughout history been Eastern Orthodox Christians that are members of the Serbian Orthodox Church, which is governed by the Metropolitanate of Montenegro and the Littoral and the Eparchy of Budimlja and Nikšić. Eastern Orthodox Christianity is the predominant religion in Montenegro, with 71.1% of the population adhering to the religion. Meanwhile, the Serbian Orthodox Church is the largest and most popular church, with approximately 90% of Orthodox Christians in Montenegro following the church. A schismatic church called The Montenegrin Orthodox Church, which broke off from the Serbian Orthodox church in 1993, is followed by the remaining 10% of Orthodox Christians in the country. It also has not been officially recognised by the Ecumenical Patriarchate of Constantinople and is not in communion with any other canonical Orthodox Christian Church.

Despite tensions between religious groups during the Bosnian War, Montenegro remained fairly stable, mainly due to its population's perspective on religious tolerance and faith diversity. Religious institutions have guaranteed rights and are separate from the state. The second largest religion is Islam, practiced by 19% of the population. Montenegro has one of the highest proportion of Muslims in Europe and the third highest proportion among Slavic countries, behind only Bosnia and Herzegovina and North Macedonia. A little more than one-fourth of the country's Albanians are Catholics (8,085 in the 2023 census) while the rest (22,520) are mainly Sunni Muslims; in 2012 a protocol recognised Islam as an official religion, which ensures that halal foods are served at military facilities, hospitals, dormitories and social facilities; and that Muslim women are permitted to wear headscarves in schools and at public institutions, as well as ensuring that Muslims have the right to take Fridays off for the Jumu'ah (Friday)-prayer. Since the time of Vojislavljević dynasty Catholicism is autochthonous in the Montenegrin area. A small Roman Catholic population, mostly Albanians with some Croats, is divided between the Archdiocese of Antivari headed by the Primate of Serbia and the Diocese of Kotor that is a part of the Catholic Church in Croatia.

== Culture ==
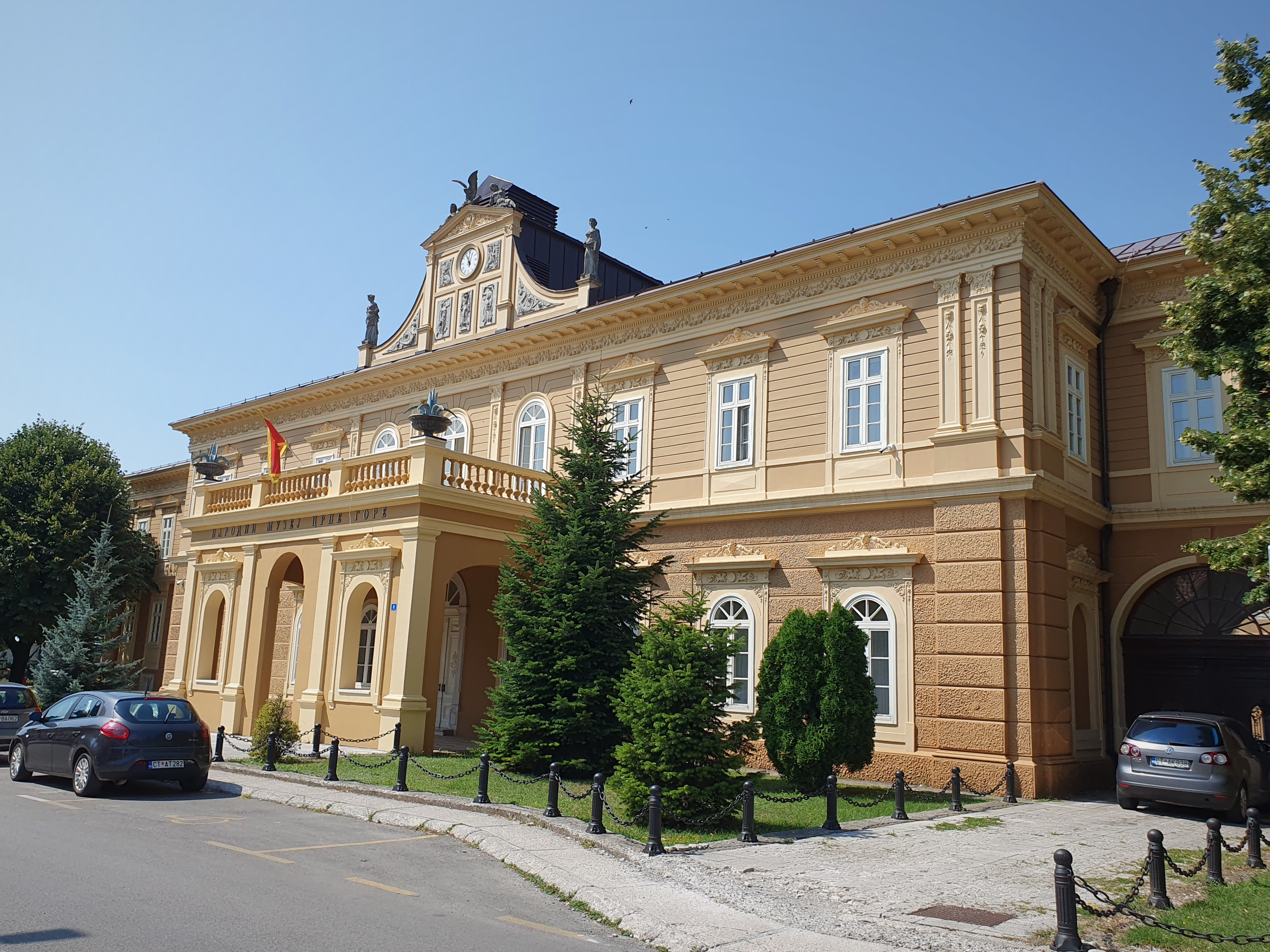
National Museum of Montenegro

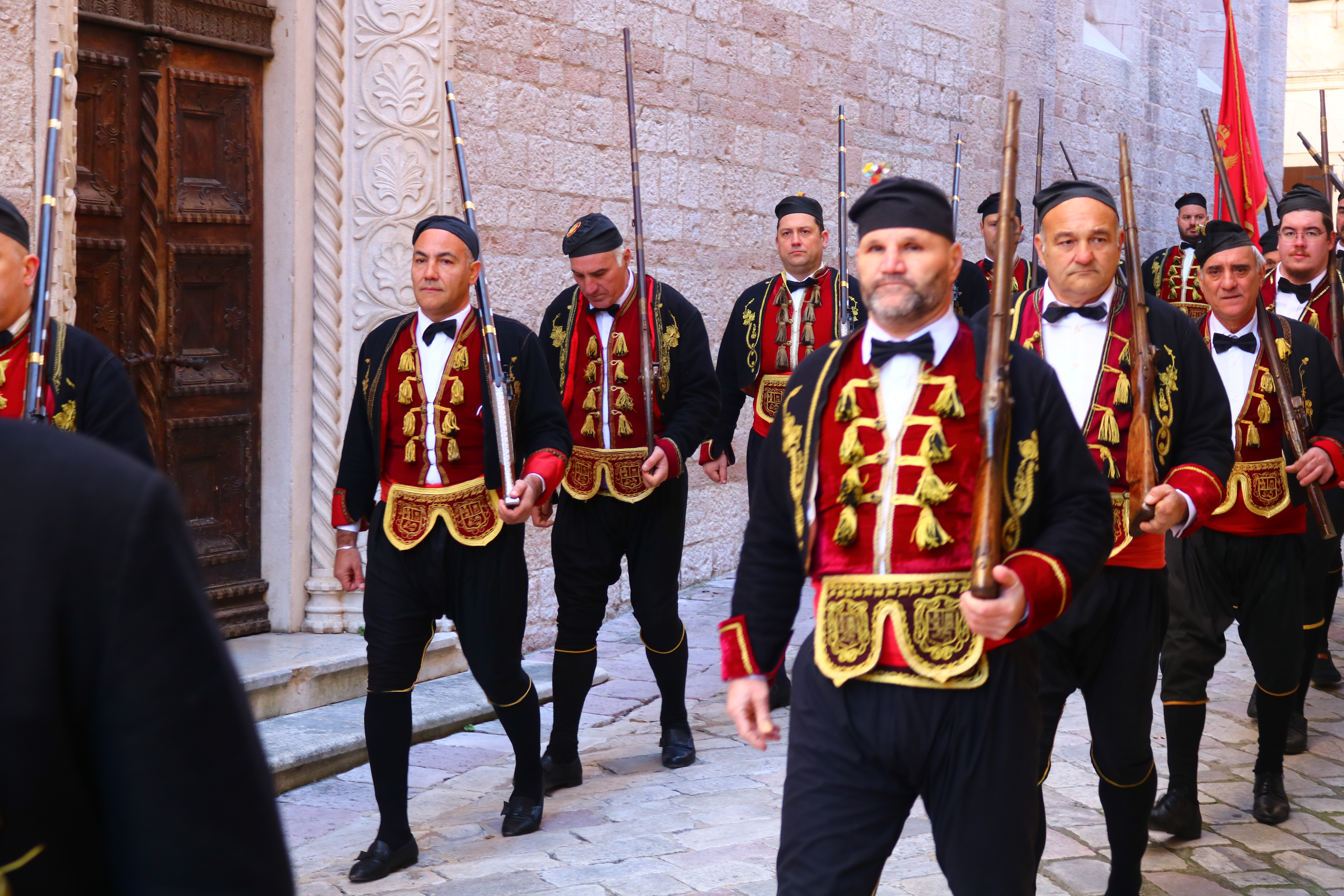
Boka Navy, from 2021 part of intangible World Heritage UNESCO

Montenegrin culture has been shaped most importantly by Orthodox, Ottoman (Turk), Slavic, Central European, and seafaring Adriatic cultures (notably parts of Italy, like the Republic of Venice).

Montenegro has many significant cultural and historical sites, including heritage sites from the pre-Romanesque, Gothic and Baroque periods. The Montenegrin coastal region is known for its religious monuments, including the Cathedral of Saint Tryphon in Kotor (Cattaro under the Venetians), the basilica of St. Luke (over 800 years), Our Lady of the Rocks (Škrpjela), the Savina Monastery and others. Medieval monasteries contain many artistically important frescoes.

One cultural dimension is the ethical ideal of Čojstvo i Junaštvo, "Humaneness and Gallantry". The traditional folk dance of the Montenegrins is the Oro, the "eagle dance" that involves dancing in circles with couples alternating in the centre, and is finished by forming a human pyramid of dancers standing on each other's shoulders.

=== Media ===
Television, magazines, and newspapers are operated by both state-owned and for-profit corporations that depend on advertising, subscription, and other sales-related revenues. The Constitution of Montenegro guarantees freedom of speech. Montenegro's media system is under transformation, along with the rest of the country. The privately owned media outlet Vijesti (News) has been the most watched in Montenegro for many years, followed by the state-owned Radio and Television of Montenegro (Radio-televizija Crne Gore, RTCG). RTCG also provides radio and television broadcasts of daily news in the Albanian language.

=== Sport ===
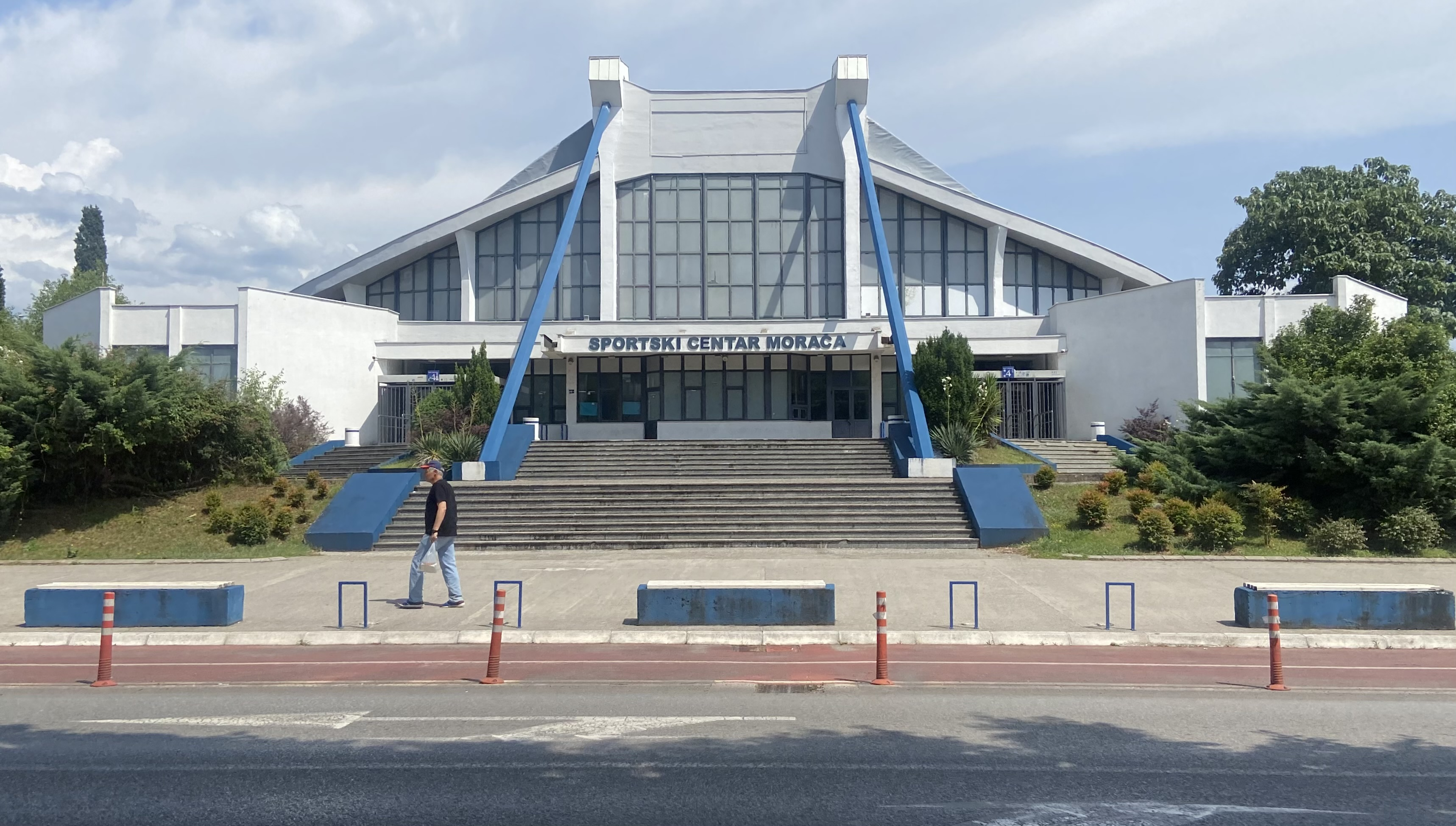
Exterior of the Morača Sports Center

Sport in Montenegro revolves mostly around team sports, such as water polo, football, basketball, handball, and volleyball. Other sports involved are boxing, tennis, swimming, judo, karate, athletics, table tennis, and chess.

Water polo is the most popular and is considered the national sport. Montenegro men's national water polo team is one of the world's top ranked teams, winning the gold medal at the 2008 Men's European Water Polo Championship in Málaga, Spain, and winning the gold medal at the 2009 FINA Men's Water Polo World League, held in Podgorica. The Montenegrin team PVK Primorac from Kotor became a champion of Europe at the LEN Euroleague 2009 in Rijeka, Croatia. Montenegro came fourth in the men's water polo in the 2016 Olympics.

Football is the second most popular sport. The Montenegro national football team, founded in 2006, played in playoffs for UEFA Euro 2012, its highest play appearance. The Montenegro national basketball team is known for good performances and won many medals as part of the Yugoslavia national basketball team. In 2006, the Basketball Federation of Montenegro along with this team joined the International Basketball Federation (FIBA) on its own, following the Independence. Montenegro participated in two EuroBaskets.

Among women sports, the national handball team is the most successful, winning the country's first Olympic medal, claiming silver at the 2012 Summer Olympics. This was followed by the 2012 European Championship which Montenegro won, becoming European champions. ŽRK Budućnost Podgorica has twice won the EHF Champions League. Montenegro was one of the host countries for the 2022 European Women's Handball Championship and came third.

=== Cuisine ===
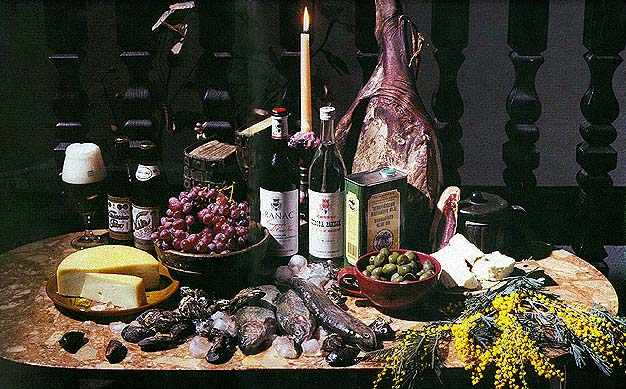
Foods from Montenegro

The first major influences to Montenegrin cuisine came from the Levant and Turkey: sarma, musaka, pilav, pita, gibanica, burek, ćevapi, kebab, đuveč, and Turkish sweets such as baklava and tulumba. Hungarian cuisine influences stews and sataraš. Central European cuisine is evident in the prevalence of crêpes, doughnuts, jams, many types of biscuits and cakes, and various kinds of breads. Montenegrin cuisine also varies geographically; with the cuisine in the coastal area differing from that of the northern highland region. The coastal area is traditionally a representative of Mediterranean cuisine, with seafood being a common dish. The traditional dishes of Montenegro's Adriatic coast, unlike its heartland, have been significantly influenced by Italian cuisine.

== See also ==
- Outline of Montenegro
- List of endemic species of Montenegro

== Sources ==
- Fine, John Van Antwerp Jr. (1994) [1987]. The Late Medieval Balkans: A Critical Survey from the Late Twelfth Century to the Ottoman Conquest. Ann Arbor, Michigan: University of Michigan Press. ISBN 0-472-08260-4.
- Pope, Stephen; Wheal, Elizabeth-Anne; Robbins, Keith (2003). Dictionary of the First World War. Pen & Sword Military Classics. ISBN 978-0-85052-979-1.
