= Legislative scrutiny =

System to assess effectiveness of statutes

Legislative scrutiny is a system for assessing the effectiveness of statutes. Legislative scrutiny will be different according to the moment when it is carried on. There are different ways of scrutinizing a bill or statute.

== General issues about legislative scrutiny ==
Legislative scrutiny is a mechanism for determining whether a particular juridical instrument is effective for accomplishing the ends for which it is or will be created. There are three ways of undertaking legislative scrutiny: before, during and after the enactment of a particular norm.

== Legislative scrutiny in the world ==
There are different ways of carrying out legislative scrutiny. They will vary according to the country where they are performed.

In the United States there are legislative scrutiny agencies, as the Government Accountability Office.

In Spain this will depend on the region where this scrutiny is carried out, for instance, in the Basque Country there are special norms about legislative scrutiny of public policies.

In Chile there are diverse ways of assessing the effectiveness of norms, an example of which are parliamentary evaluations.
