= Montenegro–NATO relations =

Bilateral relations

- NATO: Montenegro

Logo of Accession of Montenegro to NATO.

The accession of Montenegro to the North Atlantic Treaty Organization, or NATO, took place on 5 June 2017. In December 2009, Montenegro was granted a Membership Action Plan, the final step in an application for membership in the organization. A formal invitation was issued by the alliance on 2 December 2015, with accession negotiations concluded with the signature by the Foreign Ministers of an Accession Protocol on 19 May 2016. Montenegro officially joined NATO on 5 June 2017.

== Background ==
The State Union of Serbia and Montenegro applied to NATO's Partnership for Peace (PfP) program in June 2003. Montenegro declared independence on 3 June 2006 and soon after opened a Permanent Mission to NATO in Brussels. The new country subsequently joined PfP at the 2006 Riga summit. In November 2007, Montenegro signed a transit agreement with NATO, allowing the alliance's troops to move across the country. Montenegro then signed an agreement with the United States, in which Montenegro would destroy its outdated weaponry as a precondition for NATO membership. In late 2007, Montenegro's Defense Minister Boro Vučinić said that Montenegro would intensify its accession to the alliance after the 2008 Bucharest summit. Montenegro entered Intensified Dialogue with NATO in April 2008, and adopted an Individual Partnership Action Plan in June 2008. It was invited to join the Adriatic Charter of NATO aspirants on 25 September 2008. The country then applied for a Membership Action Plan on 5 November 2008 with support of Prime Minister Milo Đukanović, which was granted in December 2009. Montenegro also began full membership with the Adriatic Charter of NATO aspirants in May 2009.

Montenegro began to contribute its national armed forces to NATO foreign military operations. The country deployed 40 soldiers, a three-member military medical team, and two officers under German command to Afghanistan in 2010. Montenegrin peacekeepers were also deployed to Liberia and Somalia.

Montenegro has received support for its membership bid from several NATO countries, including Romania, Turkey, Germany and the United States.

In December 2013, Dnevne Novine reported that NATO had decided that Montenegro would join NATO at the same time as Macedonia, whose membership has been vetoed by Greece over the Macedonia naming dispute, making accession unlikely in 2014.

In March 2014, Montenegrin Prime Minister Milo Đukanović stated the desire for Montenegro to join NATO, and in May 2014 expressed the hopes an invitation to join the organization will be favoured at the 2014 NATO summit in September. Russian MP Mikhail Degtyarev of the nationalist LDPR warned that NATO membership would make Montenegro "a legitimate target of Russian missiles."

On 29 May 2014, the Slovenian (Karel Erjavec & Roman Jakič) and Croatian (Vesna Pusić & Ante Kotromanović) foreign and defense ministers sent a letter to the Secretary General of NATO, stressing the importance of inviting Montenegro into NATO. The Slovene defense minister also stated that he expects Montenegro to receive a NATO invitation during NATO's 2014 Summit in Wales. However, later that year NATO announced that it would not be offering any new countries membership into the organization that year. Analysts confirmed this as a sign that NATO members are becoming skeptical about further Eastern expansion following Russia's annexation of Crimea, due to worries about Russian retaliation to new security guarantees to countries so close to its borders.

In June 2014, then NATO secretary-general Anders Fogh Rasmussen suggested that NATO would open "intensified talks" with the aim of inviting Montenegro to join the alliance by the end of 2015, but that Montenegro would not get an invitation to join the NATO summit in September. Further assessment of Montenegro's progress was expected by the end of 2015.

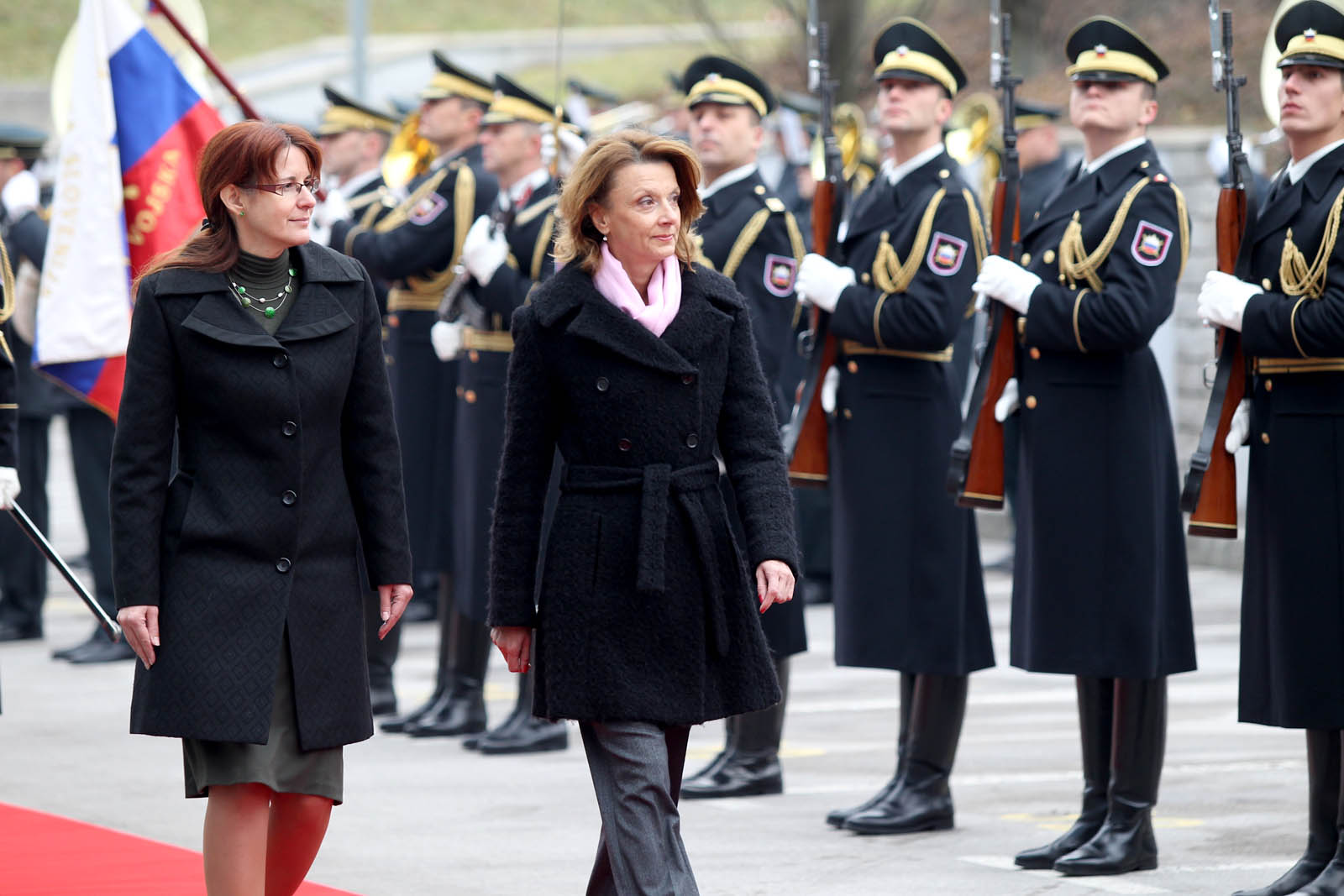
Minister of Defence Milica Pejanović-Đurišić visited Slovenia in December 2015 to discuss Montenegro's invitation to join NATO.

A formal invitation was issued by the alliance on 2 December 2015. Final accession talks began in February 2016, and concluded in May, allowing Montenegro to take an "observer" status pending ratification by the governments of the other members, as well as by Montenegro's own parliament.

Pro-Russian opposition parties argued that a referendum on NATO membership should be held simultaneously to parliamentary elections in October 2016, though the government suggested that the elections were a de facto plebiscite on the issue. Pro-NATO parties advanced in the election result.

The United States Senate voted on the Resolution of Ratification (Resolution of Advice and Consent to Ratification (Treaty Doc. 114-12)) on 28 March 2017. President Donald Trump signed a presidential memorandum on 11 April 2017. Ratification by each member state was completed with Spain's ratification on 10 May. On 28 April 2017 Montenegro's parliament ratified the accession treaty. Montenegro officially joined NATO as a member state on 5 June 2017.

The reaction of the Russian government to Montenegro's bid to join NATO had been increasingly hostile culminating in an attempt to stage a coup d'état on 16 October 2016, on the day of the parliamentary election that allegedly would have included assassination of Montenegro's prime minister Milo Đukanović, according to the statements made by Montenegrin officials. The coup plot involved Russian nationals, including a Russian military intelligence officer previously expelled from Poland. Tensions between the countries went on unabated thereafter.

== Opinion polls ==
Date	Polling Firm/Source	For NATO membership	Against NATO membership	Lead
6–12 October 2017	CISR/IRI	43	51	8.0
June 2017	CEDEM	54.2	45.8	10.0
Dec 2016	CEDEM	49.88	50.12	0.2
26 June 2016	DAMAR	54.2	45.8	8.4
24 June 2016	CEDEM	50.5	49.5	1
28 May-5 Jun 2016	NSPM	39.9	60.1	20.2
16–20 May 2016	DAMAR	54.6	45.4	9.2
22 February 2016	DAMAR	55.6	44.4	11
Feb 2016	Ipsos	50.5	49.5	1
Nov 2015	CEDEM	49.8	50.2	0.4
8–16 Oct 2015	Ipsos	56	44	10
11–18 Sep 2015	Ipsos	52	48	4
28 July 2015	CEDEM	49.5	50.5	1
8–14 Jun 2015	DAMAR	51.2	48.8	2.4
4–11 Jun 2015	Ipsos	53.4	46.6	6.8
Oct 2014	CEDEM	43.75	56.25	12.5
Mar 2014	Ipsos	52.2	47.8	4.4
11 August 2013	Ipsos	50.6	49.4	1.2
Mar 2013	CEDEM	37.3	62.7	25.4
Sep 2012	CEDEM	49	51	2
July 2012	CEDEM	46.8	53.2	6.4
Dec 2011	CEDEM	51.5	48.5	3
Sep 2011	CEDEM	43.9	56.1	12.2
Oct 2010	CEDEM	45.1	54.9	9.8
Oct 2009	CEDEM	41.5	58.5	17
24 June 2009	CEDEM	40.92	59.08	18.16
Nov 2008	CEDEM	36.45	63.55	27.1

According to a government poll in March 2014, 46 percent of Montenegro's populace supported NATO membership, while 42 percent opposed it. A poll in July 2015 from the Centre for Democracy and Human Rights, which receives financial support from NATO, found that 36.6 percent support membership, to 37.3 percent against, with sharp divisions between ethnic groups: 71.2 percent of Montenegrin Albanians and 68 percent of Montenegrin Bosniaks support membership, while only 11.3 percent of Montenegrin Serbs do. Russian MP Mikhail Degtyarev of the Nationalist LDPR threatened in May 2014 that NATO membership would make Montenegro "a legitimate target of Russian missiles."

== Political views ==
The ruling Democratic Party of Socialists of Montenegro and Social Democratic Party of Montenegro maintain a strong desire for Montenegro to become a NATO member state. In early 2009 they launched a two-year campaign with the aim of promoting accession to NATO, which is handled by the MAPA media agency under theatrical director Radmila Vojvodić. The ruling coalition of PM Milo Đukanović claims Montenegro cannot afford to remain neutral and identifies NATO and the EU as a common process of Euro-Atlantic integrations. According to a demographic breakdown of polling, citizens of pro-Serbian or pro-Russian political orientation, Eastern Orthodox Christian conservatives, women and the undereducated are the main groups that do not support NATO membership. The campaign has been somewhat successful, but received criticism from the Nansen Dialogue Centre for significant financial investment in a biased and propagandist campaign during a recession. As a direct response, the establishment of the Serb National List group launched the "No to NATO!" campaign, on a much smaller scale.

The memory of NATO's 1999 bombing campaign of the then Federal Republic of Yugoslavia and resulting civilian casualties form a crucial part of the opposition to NATO membership in Montenegro.

The leading opposition political party, the Socialist People's Party of Montenegro, has remained ambiguous on the question of NATO membership. Although strong supporters of European integration, they maintain that EU and NATO integrations are completely separate paths and endorse holding a referendum. SNP CG has generally avoided giving a direct answer, but it is indirectly opposed to NATO membership. The New Serb Democracy is an outspoken opponent of NATO membership, supporting a referendum and convinced there would be a negative outcome. The Movement for Changes is completely neutral and supports holding a referendum, and acknowledging its result. According to Strategic Marketing's poll on the question as to whether to schedule a referendum, 72% of respondents support holding it. CATI's poll from 11–15 December 2009 on the question of its result yielded the following: 44% would vote against it, 40% would vote in favor, while 8% is unsure. According to a poll released in October 2009, 31.2% of Montenegro's populace supported NATO membership, while 44% opposed it. A poll by Ipsos in March 2014 found that 46% supported membership versus 42% who were opposed. A December 2015 poll found support at 47%, opposition at 39%, with the remaining 14% undecided.

Opposition parties, including Socialist People's Party of Montenegro, have argued that membership should be approved in a national referendum. A political crisis followed the government's announcement of intention to join NATO; large protests, supported by pro-Serbian parties, were held in Podgorica in mid-October 2015 that culminated in a riot in the capital on 24 October. Đukanović accused Serbia and Russia of supporting.

A split in the ruling coalition followed in January 2016.

NATO membership was an issue of debate during the October 2016 parliamentary election. The Democratic Party of Socialists, which had governed Montenegro since 1991 and supports membership, won the election with 41% of the popular vote.

== Ratification timeline ==
Event	Date
Partnership for Peace	2006-12-14
Individual Partnership Action Plan	2008-06-20
Intensified Dialogue	2008-04-03
Membership Action Plan	2009-12-04
Invitation to join	2015-12-02
Accession protocol	2016-05-19
Domestic ratification	2017-04-28
Ratification by:
Albania	2016-09-06
Belgium	2017-01-18
Bulgaria	2016-08-18
Canada	2017-03-06
Croatia	2017-02-13
Czech Republic	2017-01-27
Denmark	2017-01-17
Estonia	2017-01-09
France	2017-04-18
Germany	2017-05-03
Greece	2017-03-22
Hungary	2016-07-11
Iceland	2016-06-23
Italy	2017-02-01
Latvia	2016-11-01
Lithuania	2016-12-20
Luxembourg	2017-02-01
Netherlands	2017-05-04
Norway	2017-02-09
Poland	2016-11-28
Portugal	2017-03-27
Romania	2017-03-24
Slovakia	2016-07-06
Slovenia	2016-07-08
Spain	2017-05-18
Turkey	2016-09-27
United Kingdom	2016-11-15
United States	2017-04-21
Member of NATO	2017-06-05

== Full membership ==
Montenegro became the 29th member of NATO on 5 June 2017 when it deposited its instrument of accession to the North Atlantic Treaty with the U.S. State Department in Washington, D.C. On 7 June 2017, The Flag of Montenegro was raised at NATO Headquarters in a special ceremony to mark the country's accession to NATO. Flag raising ceremonies were also held simultaneously at Allied Command Operations in Mons and Allied Command Transformation in Norfolk, Virginia.

== Montenegro's foreign relations with NATO member states ==
- Albania
- Belgium
- Bulgaria
- Canada
- Croatia
- Czech Republic
- Denmark
- Estonia
- Finland
- France
- Germany
- Greece
- Hungary
- Iceland
- Italy
- Latvia
- Lithuania
- Luxembourg
- Netherlands
- North Macedonia
- Norway
- Poland
- Portugal
- Romania
- Slovakia
- Slovenia
- Spain
- Sweden
- Turkey
- United Kingdom
- United States

== See also ==
- Foreign relations of Montenegro
- Foreign relations of NATO
- Accession of Montenegro to the European Union
