= Potential accession of Montenegro to the European Union =

Ongoing accession process of Montenegro to the EU

Process of potential accession of Montenegro to the European Union
- Status: Candidate negotiating (screening complete)
- Earliest possible entry: 2028
Application
European perspective	December 2002
Potential candidate	December 2002
Membership application	15 December 2008
Candidate status	17 December 2010
Screening	29 June 2012
Screened & negotiations commence	27 June 2013
Negotiations
Clusters open	5
Chapters open	8
Clusters closed	1
Chapters closed	25 75.8% complete
Memberships & Treaties
Association Agreement
1 May 2010
Economic and monetary policy
EU Free Trade Agreement	Part of the SAA
World Trade Organization (WTO)	Member since 29 April 2012
Euro & the Eurozone	Euro has de facto been used since 1 January 2002 Main article: Montenegro and the euro
Travel
Schengen visa liberalisation	19 December 2009
Energy
Energy Community	15 December 2006
Euratom	There are no nuclear power plants or research reactors in Montenegro
ENTSO-E	Crnogorski Elektroprenosni Sistem is a member
Foreign and military policy
North Atlantic Treaty Organization (NATO)	5 June 2017
Organization for Security and Co-operation in Europe (OSCE)	10 September 2000 (as the Federal Republic of Yugoslavia)
Human rights and international courts
Council of Europe (CoE)	Member since 11 May 2007
International Criminal Court (ICC)	Member since 3 June 2006
International Court of Justice (ICJ)	Entitled to appear since 28 June 2006; there are no cases
Impact (27+1)
Population	446,828,803	447,461,961 ▲0.14%
Area	4,233,262 km^{2} 1,634,472 mi^{2}	4,247,074 km^{2} 1,639,805 mi^{2} ▲0.3%
HDI	0.896	0.893 ▼0.1%
GDP (PPP)	$25.399 trillion	$25.416 trillion ▲0.07%
GDP per capita (PPP)	$56,928	$56,605 ▼0.5%
GDP	$17.818 trillion	$17.825 trillion ▲0.03%
GDP per capita	$39,940	$39,699 ▼0.6%
Gini	30.0	30.1 ▲0.1%
Official Languages	24	25; Montenegrin ▲ +1

The potential accession of Montenegro to the European Union (EU) is on the agenda for future enlargement of the EU.

After voting for independence from Serbia and Montenegro in 2006, Montenegro began the process of accession to the European Union by agreeing to a Stabilisation and Association Agreement with the EU, which officially came into force on 1 May 2010. Montenegro officially applied to join the EU on 15 December 2008. Membership negotiations began on 29 June 2012.

It is one of nine current EU candidate countries, together with Albania, Bosnia and Herzegovina, Georgia, Moldova, North Macedonia, Serbia, Turkey, and Ukraine. Among the 6 candidates with open negotiations (Montenegro, Serbia, Albania, North Macedonia, Moldova and Ukraine), the most advanced stage of the negotiations—defined as meeting the interim benchmarks for negotiation chapter 23 and 24 which allow the closing process of all negotiation chapters to start—has so far been reached by Montenegro and Albania. As of November 2026, 8 out of 33 chapters remain to be closed.

As of 2026, Montenegro's goal is to achieve membership of the EU by 2028, and the European Commissioner for Enlargement Marta Kos stated that Montenegro could complete the negotiation process by that date, placing it at the forefront of the enlargement process.

== History ==
=== Since Montenegro's potential candidate status was granted ===
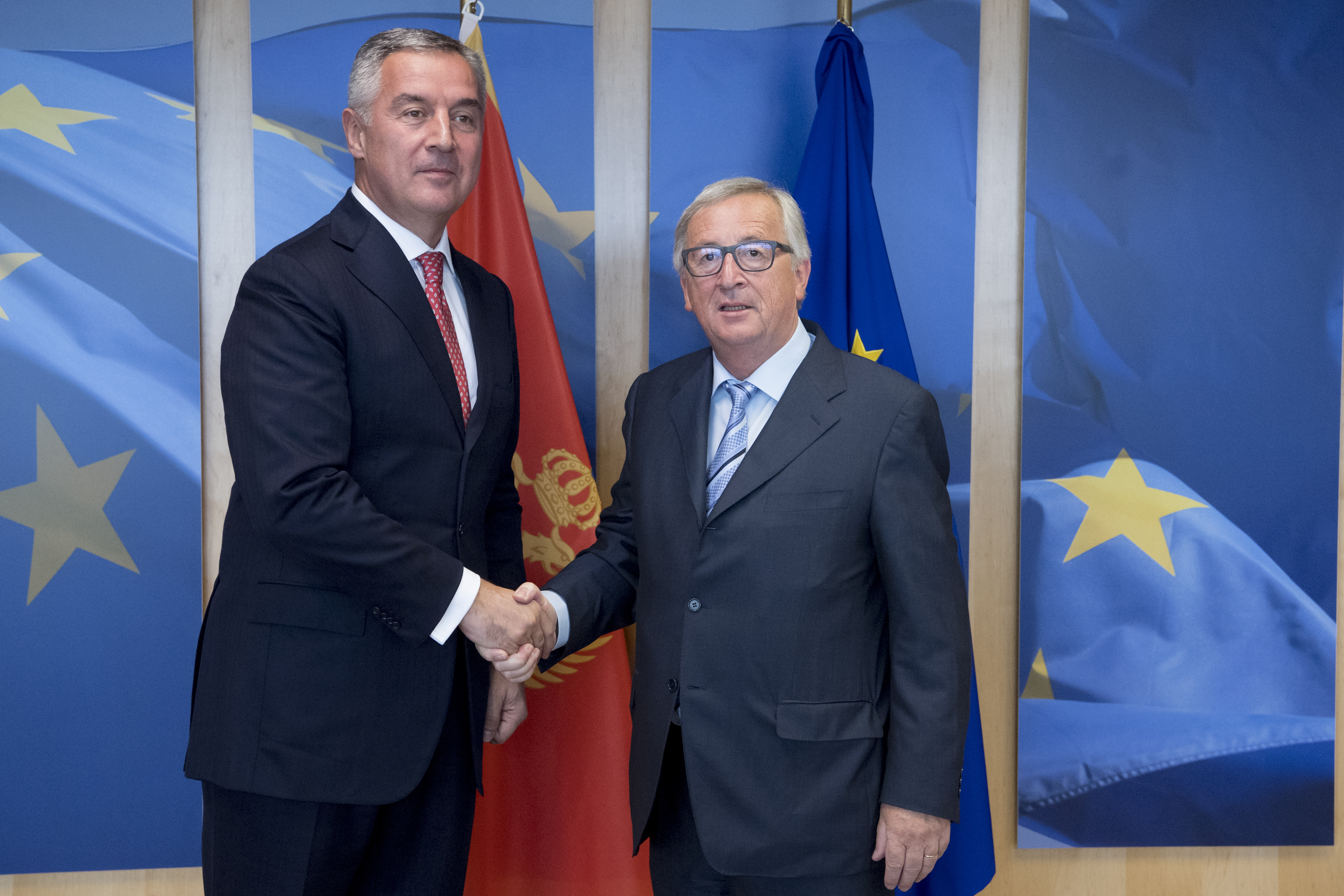
Former President of the European Commission Jean-Claude Juncker with former Montenegrin President Milo Đukanović in Brussels, Belgium on 5 June 2018

Montenegro's path toward European Union membership stretches back to December 2002, when it was still part of the State Union of Serbia and Montenegro. As a potential candidate, Montenegro was drawn into the broader framework of the EU's Stabilisation and Association Process (SAP), which was designed to guide the Western Balkans countries through political and economic reforms in preparation for eventual membership. The country's European integration track accelerated sharply following its independence in 2006, after which the EU moved quickly to establish a formal bilateral relationship, opening the door to a Stabilisation and Association Agreement, membership application, candidate status, and the launch of accession negotiations in 2012.

=== Identification ===
Montenegro was granted potential candidate status in December 2002, when it was still in a union with Serbia. The EU recognised the new and independent country's European Perspective on 21 June 2003 at the Thessaloniki Summit. The adoption of the Thessaloniki Declaration of 2003 was a promise by the EU that the former Yugoslav republics along with Albania have "unequivocal support for future integration and full membership of these states in the Union."

Following the 2006 Montenegrin independence referendum on 21 May 2006, in which 55.5% of voters supported independence, Montenegro declared independence from the State Union of Serbia and Montenegro on 3 June 2006. The EU moved swiftly to recognise the new state and establish bilateral relations. A mandate for direct negotiations on a Stabilisation and Association Agreement (SAA) was established in July 2006, and separate negotiations with an independent Montenegro began in September 2006. The Agreement was initialled in Podgorica on 15 March 2007 and formally signed in Luxembourg on 15 October 2007. On 13 November 2007, the Parliament of Montenegro ratified the SAA along with an interim agreement and agreements on visa liberalisation and readmission. On 1 January 2008, the Interim Agreement on trade and related issues, the Visa Liberalisation Agreement, and the Readmission Agreement all entered into force. The SAA itself entered into full force on 1 May 2010, after ratification by all 27 EU member states.

The SAA established a broad framework for political dialogue, economic cooperation, and the gradual harmonisation of Montenegrin law with the EU acquis. It committed Montenegro to democratic principles, the rule of law, respect for human rights, and cooperation with the International Criminal Tribunal for the former Yugoslavia. It also provided for the progressive establishment of a bilateral free trade area over a maximum period of five years, and made Montenegro eligible for EU financial assistance conditional on continued progress toward the Copenhagen criteria.

=== Membership application ===
Montenegro officially applied to join the EU on 15 December 2008. The application was submitted by Prime Minister Milo Đukanović to French President Nicolas Sarkozy, who at the time held the rotating presidency of the Council of the European Union. The submission was presented during a ceremony in Brussels and built upon the foundation of the SAA, emphasising Montenegro's commitment to aligning with EU standards in areas such as the rule of law, economic reforms, and regional cooperation.

=== Questionnaire ===
On 23 April 2009, the Council invited the European Commission to submit its opinion on the application. The Commission presented Montenegro with a questionnaire to assess its application on 22 July 2009. On 9 December 2009, Montenegro delivered its answers to the EC questionnaire. In 2010, the Commission issued a favourable opinion on Montenegro's application, identifying seven key priorities that would need to be addressed for negotiations to begin.

=== Recommendation ===
The European Commission issued a favourable opinion on Montenegro's membership application on 9 November 2010, recommending it as a candidate country. The commission's opinion identified seven key priority areas that Montenegro would need to address before accession negotiations could begin, including the rule of law, the fight against corruption and organised crime, and the freedom of the press. Montenegro officially was granted candidate status by the European Council on 17 December 2010.

=== Candidacy ===
Following the granting of candidate status, the Council agreed in December 2011 to launch the accession process, with a view to opening formal negotiations by June 2012. The accession negotiations with Montenegro were formally opened on 29 June 2012 at the first ministerial-level meeting of the Intergovernmental Accession Conference in Brussels. Montenegro was the first Western Balkans country to begin negotiations under the EU's "new approach," which required that Chapters 23 (Judiciary and Fundamental Rights) and 24 (Justice, Freedom and Security) be opened first and remain open throughout the negotiation process, given their centrality to democratic reform.

Negotiations proceeded gradually over the following years. The screening of all 33 negotiating chapters was completed by June 2013, and the Council regularly opened chapters in subsequent years through a series of Intergovernmental Conferences. However, progress toward the provisional closure of chapters remained slow through much of the 2010s. By 2018, the accession process had effectively stalled due to a lack of substantial progress in the rule-of-law area and insufficient political will for reform.

Momentum resumed following Russia's full-scale invasion of Ukraine in February 2022, which prompted the EU to reinvigorate its enlargement policy as a strategic priority. In May 2021 the council had already agreed to apply a revised enlargement methodology to the accession negotiations with Montenegro and Serbia, placing stronger emphasis on fundamental reforms and providing greater political impetus. Following the election of Prime Minister Milojko Spajić in October 2023, Montenegro's government regained momentum, reaching agreement on long-delayed judicial appointments and accelerating its reform agenda. In June 2024, Podgorica received a positive Interim Benchmark Assessment Report (IBAR), confirming that it had met the interim benchmarks in Chapters 23 and 24 — a prerequisite for provisional closure of other negotiating chapters. All 33 negotiating chapters have since been opened, and as of November 2026, twenty-three have been provisionally closed.

=== Ad Hoc Working Party ===
On May 1, 2026, the EU approved an Ad Hoc Working Party made up of representatives from various EU countries to work out the legal fine print on Montenegro's accession. According to one diplomat the document will be around 80 percent to 85 percent identical to Croatia's accession treaty. At the time Montenegro had closed out 21 of the 33 chapters needed for accession, and had set out a timetable to join the EU by 2028. The EU has rapidly accelerated their accession process and intends for Montenegro to act as an experiment in "two-tier" accession to join the EU but without veto powers. On May 27 Montenegro's Prime Minister Milojko Spajić led a delegation which met with French President Emmanuel Macron at the Élysée Palace where Macron, one of the leading proponents of the "two-tier" system, stated “Montenegro can count on French support in the final stage of the EU accession process.”

One of the major final hurdles is the issue of the Montenegrin language which, if Montenegro were to join the EU, would become one of the bloc's official languages. EU diplomats have raised issue with the prospect of employing a group of Montenegrin interpreters since the language is so similar to Croatian. Croatia has reiterated that they will not allow Montenegrin ascension until a number of bilateral issues are resolved including: renaming a pool that was named in honor of Zoran Gopčević, a former Yugoslav water polo player who also was a guard at the Morinj camp, resolving their disputed territorial waters, and the return of the school ship Jadran.

== Treaties ==
=== Stabilisation and Association Agreement ===
The State Union of Serbia and Montenegro started the process of Accession to the European Union in November 2005, when negotiations over a Stabilisation and Association Agreement began. The EU concluded such agreements with states that wish to become members. In exchange for commitments to political, economic, trade, or human rights reform in the country, tariff-free access to some or all EU markets (industrial goods, agricultural products, etc.), and financial or technical assistance may be offered by the EU.

In May 2006, Montenegro voted for independence in a referendum, and the State Union of Serbia and Montenegro was dissolved. Serbia continued with the existing SAA negotiations, and separate negotiations were launched with Montenegro in September 2006.

The Agreement was initiated on 15 March 2007 and signed on 15 October 2007. After all the 27 member-states of EU had ratified the SAA, it came into force on 1 May 2010.

Status of SAA ratification

Event	North Macedonia	Croatia	Albania	Montenegro (Note: Montenegro started negotiations in November 2005 while a part of Serbia and Montenegro. Separate technical negotiations were conducted regarding issues of sub-state organizational competency. A mandate for direct negotiations with Montenegro was established in July 2006. Direct negotiations were initiated on 26 September 2006 and concluded on 1 December 2006.)	Bosnia and Herzegovina	Serbia (Note: Serbia started negotiations in November 2005 while part of Serbia and Montenegro, with a modified mandate from July 2006.)	Kosovo (Note: Kosovo declared independence from Serbia in 2008 but is still claimed by Serbia as part of its territory. The European Union remains divided, with five EU member states not recognizing its independence. The EU launched a Stabilisation Tracking Mechanism for Kosovo on 6 November 2002 with the aim of aligning its policy with EU standards. On 10 October 2012 the European Commission found that there were no legal obstacles to Kosovo signing a SAA with the EU, as independence is not required for such an agreement.)
SAA negotiations start	2000-04-05	2000-11-24	2003-01-31	2005-10-10	2005-11-25	2005-10-10	2013-10-28
SAA initialled	2000-11-24	2001-05-14	2006-02-28	2007-03-15	2007-12-04	2007-11-07	2014-07-25
SAA/IA signature	2001-04-09	2001-10-29	2006-06-12	2007-10-15	2008-06-16	2008-04-29	2015-10-27
Interim Agreement:
EC ratification	2001-04-27	2002-01-30	2006-06-12	2007-10-15	2008-06-16	2009-12-08	N/A (Note: No Interim Agreement associated with Kosovo's SAA was concluded.)
SAP state ratification	2001-04-27	2002-01-30	2006-10-09	2007-11-14	2008-06-20	2008-09-22	N/A
entry into force	2001-06-01	2002-03-01	2006-12-01	2008-01-01	2008-07-01	2010-02-01	N/A
Deposit of the instrument of ratification:
SAP state	2001-04-27	2002-01-30	2006-11-09	2007-11-13	2009-02-26	2008-09-22	2016-02-26
Austria	2002-09-06	2002-03-15	2008-05-21	2008-07-04	2009-09-04	2011-01-13	N/A
Belgium	2003-12-29	2003-12-17	2008-10-22	2010-03-29	2010-03-29	2012-03-20	N/A
Bulgaria	joined the EU later			2008-05-30	2009-03-13	2010-08-12	N/A
Croatia	joined the EU later						N/A
Cyprus	joined the EU later		2008-05-30	2008-11-20	2009-07-02	2010-11-26	N/A
Czech Republic	joined the EU later		2008-05-07	2009-02-19	2009-07-23	2011-01-28	N/A
Denmark	2002-04-10	2002-05-08	2008-04-24	2008-06-25	2009-05-26	2011-03-04	N/A
Estonia	joined the EU later		2007-10-17	2007-11-22	2008-09-11	2010-08-19	N/A
Finland	2004-01-06	2004-01-06	2007-11-29	2009-03-18	2009-04-07	2011-10-21	N/A
France	2003-06-04	2003-06-04	2009-02-12	2009-07-30	2011-02-10	2012-01-16	N/A
Germany	2002-06-20	2002-10-18	2009-02-19	2009-11-16	2009-08-14	2012-02-24	N/A
Greece	2003-08-27	2003-08-27	2009-02-26	2010-03-04	2010-09-20	2011-03-10	N/A
Hungary	joined the EU later		2007-04-23	2008-05-14	2008-10-22	2010-11-16	N/A
Ireland	2002-05-06	2002-05-06	2007-06-11	2009-06-04	2009-06-04	2011-09-29	N/A
Italy	2003-10-30	2004-10-06	2008-01-07	2009-10-13	2010-09-08	2011-01-06	N/A
Latvia	joined the EU later		2006-12-19	2008-10-17	2009-11-12	2011-05-30	N/A
Lithuania	joined the EU later		2007-05-17	2009-03-04	2009-05-04	2013-06-26	N/A
Luxembourg	2003-07-28	2003-08-01	2007-07-04	2009-06-11	2010-12-22	2011-01-21	N/A
Malta	joined the EU later		2008-04-21	2008-12-11	2010-01-07	2010-07-06	N/A
Netherlands	2002-09-09	2004-04-30	2007-12-10	2009-01-29	2009-09-30	2012-02-27	N/A
Poland	joined the EU later		2007-04-14	2009-02-06	2010-04-07	2012-01-13	N/A
Portugal	2003-07-14	2003-07-14	2008-07-11	2008-09-23	2009-06-29	2011-03-04	N/A
Romania	joined the EU later			2009-01-15	2010-01-08	2012-05-22	N/A
Slovakia	joined the EU later		2007-07-20	2008-07-29	2009-03-17	2010-11-11	N/A
Slovenia	joined the EU later		2007-01-18	2008-02-07	2009-03-10	2010-12-07	N/A
Spain	2002-10-04	2002-10-04	2007-05-03	2009-03-12	2010-06-15	2010-06-21	N/A
Sweden	2002-06-25	2003-03-27	2007-03-21	2009-03-11	2009-09-14	2011-04-15	N/A
United Kingdom	2002-12-17	2004-09-03	2007-10-16	2010-01-12	2010-04-20	2011-08-11	N/A
European Communities or European Union and Euratom	2004-02-25	2004-12-21	2009-02-26	2010-03-29	2015-04-30	2013-07-22	2016-02-24 (Note: Kosovo's SAA was the first signed after the entry into force of the Lisbon treaty, which conferred a legal personality to the EU. As a result, unlike previous SAAs Kosovo's is exclusively between it and the EU and Euratom, and the member states are not parties independently.)
SAA entry into force	2004-04-01	2005-02-01	2009-04-01	2010-05-01	2015-06-01	2013-09-01	2016-04-01
EU membership (SAA lapsed)	(TBD)	2013-07-01	(TBD)	(TBD)	(TBD)	(TBD)	(TBD)

N/A: Not applicable.

== EU programs and organisations ==
- Eastern Partnership: 22 January 2007
- Energy Community: joined 15 December 2006
- European Network of Transmission System Operators for Electricity:
- Southeast Europe Transport Community: since establishment in 2017

== Public opinion ==
Montenegro's population is overwhelmingly pro-EU, with 76.2% being in favour according to polling and only 9.8% against, in October 2009.

As of May 2023, the support of the citizens of Montenegro for the country's membership in the European Union reached a record high of 79.3%, according to a survey commissioned by the EU Delegation to Montenegro. The survey reported 75.9% of citizens believe that Montenegro will become a member of the EU. Over 90% of citizens would vote in the referendum, and 81.1% of those voting would support Montenegro's membership in the EU.

According to a survey carried out in March and April 2025 by Eurobarometer, 83% of citizens of Montenegro tend to trust the EU, while 17% tend not to trust it. When it comes to EU membership, the situation is similar: more than 80% of citizens of Montenegro believe it would be a good thing.

According to the 2025 annual survey of opinion in Montenegro, 60% of citizens have a positive attitude towards the EU (16% very positive, 44% fairly positive), while trust in the EU is 69%. It is also revealed that 64% of citizens would vote in favour of Montenegro's membership of the EU if a referendum was held, while 75% of citizens believe that EU membership would bring more advantages than disadvantages.

== Negotiations and conditions ==
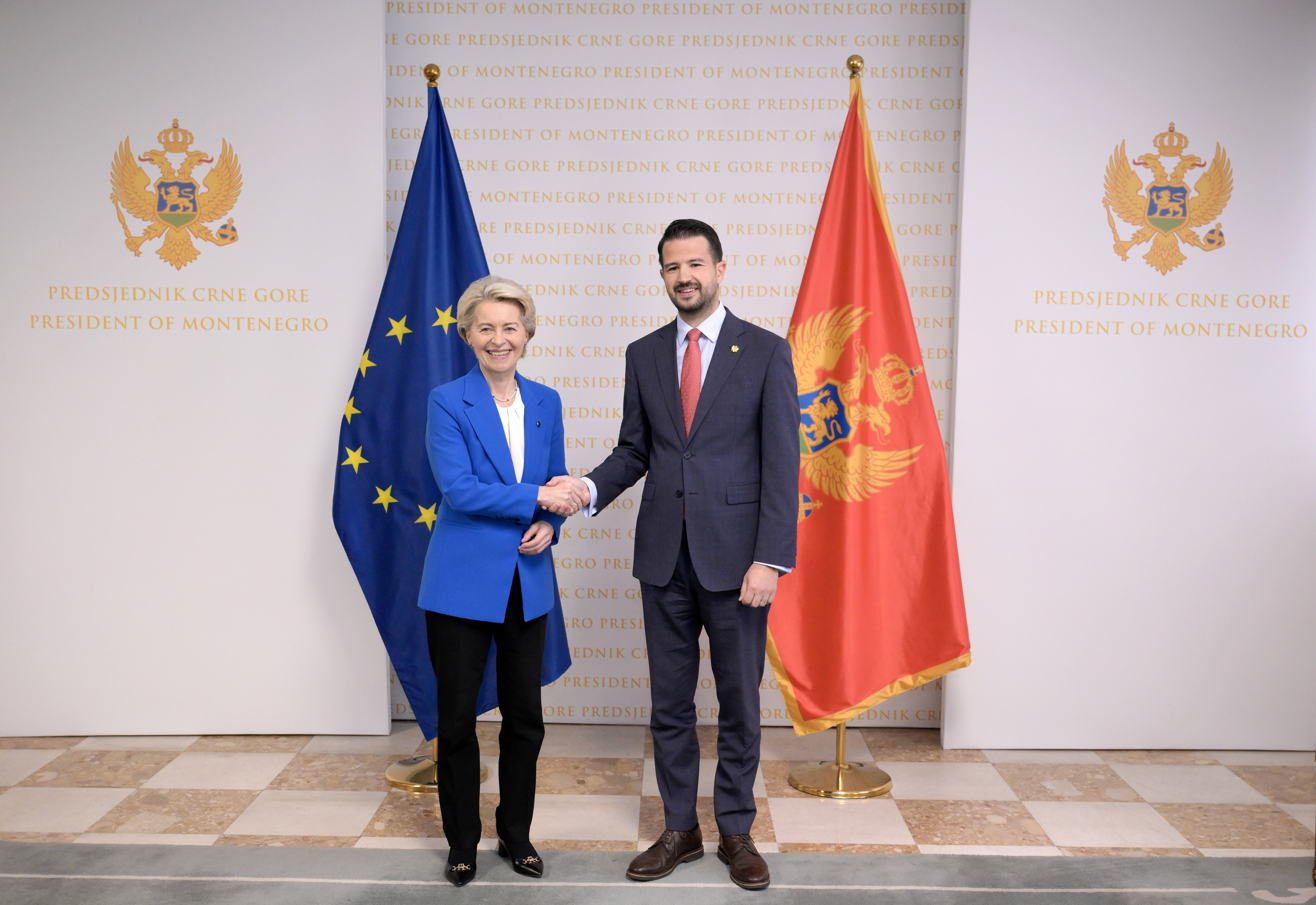
Ursula von der Leyen and Jakov Milatović in 2024

Montenegro signed an agreement with the Bulgarian government in December 2007 in which Bulgaria would assist Montenegro with its Euro-Atlantic and EU integration for the following three years. Reports at that time indicated Montenegro had ecological, judicial, and crime-related problems that may hinder its accession bid.

The Ministry of Foreign Affairs and European Integration of Montenegro has a special agency dedicated to accession to the EU, the Office for Assistance to the Chief Negotiator. The office's goal is to support the task of the Chief Negotiator for Montenegro's Accession to the EU, Zorka Kordić. On 27 July 2010, the Parliament passed a non-discrimination law that includes sexual orientation and gender identity as prohibited grounds of discrimination. This was one of the requirements the country had to meet for EU membership.

In December 2011, the Council agreed to launch the accession process, with negotiations beginning on 29 June 2012.

The 2015 European Commission Progress Report on Montenegro noted that the country had made good progress toward meeting the benchmarks to join the EU, but the nation needed to address institutional frameworks, including competition policy, fighting against corruption and organized crime, and work in the areas of the environment and climate change.

A 2015 study of the readiness to join the EU by using data from the World Bank Enterprise Survey collected from enterprise owners and management indicated that Montenegro passed three out of six business dimensions: basic infrastructure, goods delivery, and secure legal secure environment, but was lower than four other candidate nations in resources, technology support, and regulations.

In its 2016 assessment of the accession progress, the European Parliament identified Montenegro as having the highest level of preparation for membership among the negotiating candidate nations.

From 2014 through 2020, Montenegro received €279.1 million of developmental aid (not including the allocation for Cross-border Cooperation) from the Instrument for Pre-Accession Assistance, a funding mechanism for EU candidate countries. The priority areas for these funds include: democracy and governance, rule of law and fundamental rights, environment and climate action, transport, competitiveness and innovation, education, employment and social policies, agriculture and rural development, regional and territorial cooperation.

With all the negotiating chapters opened as of 2021, Montenegro had widespread support among EU members' officials with possible accession to the EU considered by 2025.

On 22 April 2026 EU ambassadors approved the creation of an ad hoc working group for the drafting of Montenegro's accession treaty.

The Parliament of Montenegro voted on amendments to the Constitution of Montenegro on 6 July 2026. These amendments were needed to fulfill benchmarks for the closing of Chapter 23 (Judiciary & Fundamental Rights) and Chapter 24 (Justice, Freedom & Security).

On 17 August 2026, the Constitutional Committee of the Parliament of Montenegro approved a proposal for constitutional amendments concerning the Judicial and Prosecutorial Councils and the Central Bank of Montenegro (CBCG) and a constitutional law regulating their implementation. Chair of the Constitutional Committee Jelena Božović said the amendments proposed by the government had been coordinated with the European Commission and were linked to the country's obligations under closing negotiating Chapters 17 and 23. The Parliament of Montenegro adopted constitutional amendments on 24 August 2026 that change the composition and appointment procedures of the Judicial and Prosecutorial Councils, reduce the direct influence of the executive branch over the judiciary, and provide additional guarantees for the independence of the Central Bank of Montenegro.

On 27 August 2026, the announced closure of the new negotiating chapters with the EU will be accompanied by coordinated hybrid actions involving officials from at least two countries in the region, announced by prime minister Milojko Spajić.

On 31 August 2026, the European Commission stated that any interference in Montenegro's EU accession process would be unacceptable. Responding to questions from Vijesti about prime minister Spajić's statement that the closing of negotiating chapters would be accompanied by hybrid activities, involving at least two countries from the region, the Commission stated that the EU was already supporting the Montenegrin authorities in addressing growing hybrid threats, including those aimed at disrupting the country's European path. They added that it remained in close contact with the Montenegrin authorities and continued to closely monitor developments in order to support Montenegro's stability and its path towards EU membership.

Local media in Montenegro learned that the EU was preparing a new, accelerated plan to complete accession negotiations with Montenegro, which envisages closing all remaining chapters by the end of 2026 and preparing the first draft of the Accession Treaty. President of the European Council António Costa stressed in his invitation to leaders that the European Council’s debate would highlight the ongoing work on the accession treaty with Montenegro and the aim of concluding negotiations by the end of 2026.

On 20 September 2026, Montenegro's Ministry of European Affairs called on the media to carefully verify information concerning the country's EU accession negotiations, after reports emerged that five EU member states had sought to halt Montenegro's accession process. Claims are also denied by the EU delegation in Podgorica. The Ministry said that, as the negotiations approach their final stage, there has been an increase of disinformation and content displaying characteristics of both domestic and foreign information manipulation, particularly regarding the positions of EU member states, the pace of negotiations and the closure of negotiating chapters. According to Dan, Croatia, Estonia, Lithuania and Latvia joined the Dutch request, making it uncertain when Montenegro could close additional negotiating chapters and hold its next intergovernmental conference. The EU delegation in Podgorica dismissed the claims as unfounded, noting that the scheduling of intergovernmental conferences and the closure of negotiating chapters require the completion of the relevant procedures, compliance with EU standards and the consent of all member states. At the same time, the Delegation said Montenegro had made significant progress in its accession negotiations but needed to continue implementing the remaining reforms, particularly in the area of the rule of law.

Ursula von der Leyen stressed that Montenegro has made progress in reforms “and that is why it had closed so many chapters”, adding that “EU membership is within reach, which will send a strong message to the Western Balkans”, it was reported by Vijesti. She underlined that “the work is now advancing to prepare Montenegro’s Accession Treaty”.

European Western Balkans spoke with Predrag Zenović, Montenegro's Chief Negotiator with the European Union, on the margins of the 2026 Civil Society Forum in Pristina on 6 October 2026.

The European Council has also approved conclusions on the €3.2 billion financial package, with Chapter 33 already presented.

According to Milojko Spajić, the Government of Montenegro has completed literally all obligations under its jurisdiction necessary for the final stage of accession negotiations.

The European Council welcomed the ongoing work on drafting the accession treaty with Montenegro. It noted the intention of the Irish Council Presidency to work towards the provisional closure of the remaining negotiating chapters, subject to the implementation of the corresponding reforms by Montenegro, the press release concluded. Despite being billed as a potential turning point for EU enlargement, the European Council summit failed to provide clear political guidance on the way forward. Instead, leaders once again reaffirmed their broad support for admitting new members, while the most significant element of the draft conclusions - a target date for Montenegro to complete its accession negotiations by the end of 2026 - was dropped at Croatia's request at the last minute.

The Parliament of Montenegro has backed a proposal to introduce mandatory integrity checks for nominees for prime minister and cabinet posts, in a vote linked by the government to the country's EU accession commitments. The proposal received the support of 56MPs, exceeding the required two-thirds majority. Deputy Prime Minister Momo Koprivica defended the proposal as a safeguard for democratic institutions and described it as a prerequisite for closing Chapter 23, covering judiciary and fundamental rights in EU accession negotiations.

Maida Gorčević, Minister of European Affairs of Montenegro, stated that the Government of Montenegro had adopted all negotiating positions and submitted reports to the European Commission on the fulfilment of the closing benchmarks for all remaining chapters.

On 3 November 2026 Radio Free Europe reported that it had obtained the draft accession roadmap for Montenegro ahead of its planned publication on 4 November 2026. According to the leaked roadmap one more accession conference is expected. The last in December 2026 would close all remaining chapters. The Accession Treaty is expected to be drafted during spring 2027 with it being signed in June 2027.

As of November 2026, eight chapters are open and twenty-five and a cluster have been provisionally closed, while two have nothing to adopt.

The 31st accession conference with Montenegro has been held on 19 November 2026, to provisionally close Chapter 16 (Taxation) and Chapter 22 (Regional Policy & Coordination of Structural Instruments).

=== Current chapter status tables ===
Clusters of negotiating chapters
Clusters	Acquis Chapter	Status	
Overview	Overview	25 out of 33	1 out of 6
1. Fundamentals	23. Judiciary & Fundamental Rights	Opened	Opened
1. Fundamentals	24. Justice, Freedom & Security	Opened	Opened
1. Fundamentals	Economic criteria	–	Opened
1. Fundamentals	Functioning of democratic institutions	–	Opened
1. Fundamentals	Public administration reform	–	Opened
1. Fundamentals	5. Public Procurement	Closed	Opened
1. Fundamentals	18. Statistics	Closed	Opened
1. Fundamentals	32. Financial Control	Closed	Opened
2. Internal Market	1. Free Movement of Goods	Closed	Opened
2. Internal Market	2. Freedom of Movement For Workers	Closed	Opened
2. Internal Market	3. Right of Establishment & Freedom To Provide Services	Closed	Opened
2. Internal Market	4. Free Movement of Capital	Closed	Opened
2. Internal Market	6. Company Law	Closed	Opened
2. Internal Market	7. Intellectual Property Law	Closed	Opened
2. Internal Market	8. Competition Policy	Closed	Opened
2. Internal Market	9. Financial Services	Opened	Opened
2. Internal Market	28. Consumer & Health Protection	Closed	Opened
3. Competitiveness; and inclusive growth	10. Information Society & Media	Closed	Closed
3. Competitiveness; and inclusive growth	16. Taxation	Closed	Closed
3. Competitiveness; and inclusive growth	17. Economic & Monetary Policy	Closed	Closed
3. Competitiveness; and inclusive growth	19. Social Policy & Employment	Closed	Closed
3. Competitiveness; and inclusive growth	20. Enterprise & Industrial Policy	Closed	Closed
3. Competitiveness; and inclusive growth	25. Science & Research	Closed	Closed
3. Competitiveness; and inclusive growth	26. Education & Culture	Closed	Closed
3. Competitiveness; and inclusive growth	29. Customs Union	Closed	Closed
4. Green agenda; and sustainable connectivity	14. Transport Policy	Opened	Opened
4. Green agenda; and sustainable connectivity	15. Energy	Opened	Opened
4. Green agenda; and sustainable connectivity	21. Trans-European Networks	Closed	Opened
4. Green agenda; and sustainable connectivity	27. Environment	Opened	Opened
5. Resources, agriculture; and cohesion	11. Agriculture & Rural Development	Closed	Opened
5. Resources, agriculture; and cohesion	12. Food Safety, Veterinary & Phytosanitary Policy	Closed	Opened
5. Resources, agriculture; and cohesion	13. Fisheries	Closed	Opened
5. Resources, agriculture; and cohesion	22. Regional Policy & Coordination of Structural Instruments	Closed	Opened
5. Resources, agriculture; and cohesion	33. Financial & Budgetary Provisions	Opened	Opened
6. External relations	30. External Relations	Closed	Opened
6. External relations	31. Foreign, Security & Defence Policy	Opened	Opened
	34. Institutions	–	–
	35. Other Issues	–	–

Screening and Chapter Dates
Progression	33 / 33 100% complete	33 / 33 100% complete	33 / 33 100% complete	25 / 33 75.8% complete
Acquis chapter	Screening Started	Screening Completed	Chapters Opened	Chapters Closed
1. Free Movement of Goods	2013-01-14	2013-03-06	2017-06-20	2026-11-06
2. Freedom of Movement For Workers	2013-05-13	2013-06-07	2017-12-11	2026-06-15
3. Right of Establishment & Freedom To Provide Services	2012-10-23	2012-11-30	2017-12-11	2025-12-16
4. Free Movement of Capital	2013-01-18	2013-02-21	2014-06-24	2025-12-16
5. Public Procurement	2012-09-27	2012-11-19	2013-12-18	2025-06-27
6. Company Law	2012-10-02	2012-11-22	2013-12-18	2025-12-16
7. Intellectual Property Law	2012-10-11	2012-11-21	2014-03-31	2024-12-16
8. Competition Policy	2012-10-03	2012-12-04	2020-06-30	2026-07-14
9. Financial Services	2013-04-17	2013-06-11	2015-06-22	–
10. Information Society & Media	2012-12-06	2013-01-22	2014-03-31	2024-12-16
11. Agriculture & Rural Development	2012-11-06	2012-12-13	2016-12-13	2025-12-16
12. Food Safety, Veterinary & Phytosanitary Policy	2012-10-15	2013-02-01	2016-06-30	2026-11-06
13. Fisheries	2013-03-14	2013-06-06	2016-06-30	2025-12-16
14. Transport Policy	2013-04-22	2013-05-30	2015-12-21	–
15. Energy	2013-02-27	2013-04-11	2015-12-21	–
16. Taxation	2013-04-08	2013-04-30	2015-03-30	2026-11-19
17. Economic & Monetary Policy	2013-01-10	2013-02-26	2018-06-25	2026-10-12
18. Statistics	2013-06-03	2013-06-25	2014-12-16	2026-10-12
19. Social Policy & Employment	2013-01-23	2013-03-13	2016-12-13	2026-10-12
20. Enterprise & Industrial Policy	2012-10-25	2012-11-28	2013-12-18	2024-12-16
21. Trans-European Networks	2013-04-22	2013-05-30	2015-06-22	2026-03-17
22. Regional Policy & Coordination of Structural Instruments	2012-11-14	2012-12-18	2017-06-20	2026-11-19
23. Judiciary & Fundamental Rights	2012-03-26	2012-05-31	2013-12-18	–
24. Justice, Freedom & Security	2012-03-28	2012-05-25	2013-12-18	–
25. Science & Research	2012-09-24	2012-09-25	2012-12-18	2012-12-18
26. Education & Culture	2012-09-26	2012-11-16	2013-04-15	2013-04-15
27. Environment & Climate Change	2013-02-04	2013-03-22	2018-12-10	–
28. Consumer & Health Protection	2013-02-19	2013-04-16	2014-12-16	2026-06-15
29. Customs Union	2013-05-23	2013-06-21	2014-12-16	2026-07-14
30. External Relations	2013-05-14	2013-06-12	2015-03-30	2017-06-20
31. Foreign, Security & Defence Policy	2013-05-17	2013-06-27	2014-06-24	–
32. Financial Control	2013-05-16	2013-06-19	2014-06-24	2026-01-26
33. Financial & Budgetary Provisions	2013-05-15	2013-06-26	2014-12-16	–
34. Institutions	N/A	N/A	N/A	N/A
35. Other Issues	N/A	N/A	N/A	N/A

November 2026 European Commission Report
Acquis chapter	Status as of Nov 2026	Chapter Status as of November 2026
Overview	2 chapters with moderate preparation, 3 chapters with moderate/good preparation, 24 chapters with good level of preparation, 2 chapters with good/advanced level of preparation, 2 chapters with advanced level of preparation, 2 chapters with nothing to adopt.	25 chapters closed, 8 chapters open.
1. Free Movement of Goods	Good level of preparation	Chapter closed
2. Freedom of Movement For Workers	Moderate / Good	Chapter closed
3. Right of Establishment & Freedom To Provide Services	Good level of preparation	Chapter closed
4. Free Movement of Capital	Good level of preparation	Chapter closed
5. Public Procurement	Good level of preparation	Chapter closed
6. Company Law	Good / Well advanced	Chapter closed
7. Intellectual Property Law	Well advanced	Chapter closed
8. Competition Policy	Good level of preparation	Chapter closed
9. Financial Services	Good level of preparation	Chapter open
10. Information Society & Media	Good level of preparation	Chapter closed
11. Agriculture & Rural Development	Moderate / Good	Chapter closed
12. Food Safety, Veterinary & Phytosanitary Policy	Moderate / Good	Chapter closed
13. Fisheries	Good level of preparation	Chapter closed
14. Transport Policy	Good level of preparation	Chapter open
15. Energy	Good level of preparation	Chapter open
16. Taxation	Good level of preparation	Chapter closed
17. Economic & Monetary Policy	Good level of preparation	Chapter closed
18. Statistics	Good level of preparation	Chapter closed
19. Social Policy & Employment	Good level of preparation	Chapter closed
20. Enterprise & Industrial Policy	Good / Well advanced	Chapter closed
21. Trans-European Networks	Good level of preparation	Chapter closed
22. Regional Policy & Coordination of Structural Instruments	Good level of preparation	Chapter closed
23. Judiciary & Fundamental Rights	Good level of preparation	Chapter open
24. Justice, Freedom & Security	Good level of preparation	Chapter open
25. Science & Research	Good level of preparation	Chapter closed
26. Education & Culture	Good level of preparation	Chapter closed
27. Environment & Climate Change	Moderately prepared	Chapter open
28. Consumer & Health Protection	Good level of preparation	Chapter closed
29. Customs Union	Good level of preparation	Chapter closed
30. External Relations	Good level of preparation	Chapter closed
31. Foreign, Security & Defence Policy	Well advanced	Chapter open
32. Financial Control	Good level of preparation	Chapter closed
33. Financial & Budgetary Provisions	Moderately prepared	Chapter open
34. Institutions	Nothing to adopt	Nothing to adopt
35. Other Issues	Nothing to adopt	Nothing to adopt
Legend: Well advanced Good / Well advanced Good level of preparation Moderate / Good Moderately prepared Some / Moderate Some level of preparation Early stage / Some Early stage

Report history
Clusters	Acquis Chapter	October 2011	October 2012	October 2013	October 2014	November 2015	November 2016	April 2018	May 2019	October 2020	October 2021	October 2022	November 2023	October 2024	November 2025	November 2026
1. Fundamentals	Public administration reform	-	-	-	-	Moderately prepared	Moderately prepared	Moderately prepared	Moderately prepared	Moderately prepared	Moderately prepared	Moderately prepared	Moderately prepared	Moderately prepared	Moderately prepared	Good level of preparation
1. Fundamentals	23. Judiciary & Fundamental Rights	Further efforts needed	Moderately prepared	Further efforts needed	Further efforts needed	Moderately prepared	Moderately prepared	Moderately prepared	Moderately prepared	Moderately prepared	Moderately prepared	Moderately prepared	Moderately prepared	Moderately prepared	Moderate / Good	Good level of preparation
1. Fundamentals	24. Justice, Freedom & Security	Further efforts needed	Moderately prepared	Further efforts needed	Early stage	Moderately prepared	Moderately prepared	Moderately prepared	Moderately prepared	Moderately prepared	Moderately prepared	Moderately prepared	Moderately prepared	Moderate / Good	Moderate / Good	Good level of preparation
1. Fundamentals	Economic criteria	-	-	-	-	Moderately prepared	Moderately prepared	Moderately prepared	Moderately prepared	Moderately prepared	Moderately prepared	Moderately prepared	Moderately prepared	Moderately prepared	Moderate / Good	Good level of preparation
1. Fundamentals	5. Public Procurement	Further efforts needed	Moderately prepared	Moderately prepared	Moderately prepared	Moderately prepared	Moderately prepared	Moderately prepared	Moderately prepared	Moderately prepared	Moderately prepared	Moderate / Good	Moderate / Good	Moderate / Good	Good level of preparation	Good level of preparation
1. Fundamentals	18. Statistics	Moderately prepared	Moderately prepared	Moderately prepared	Moderately prepared	Some level of preparation	Some level of preparation	Moderately prepared	Moderately prepared	Moderately prepared	Moderately prepared	Moderately prepared	Moderately prepared	Moderately prepared	Moderately prepared	Good level of preparation
1. Fundamentals	32. Financial Control	Some level of preparation	Early stage	Moderately prepared	Moderately prepared	Moderately prepared	Moderately prepared	Moderately prepared	Moderately prepared	Moderately prepared	Moderately prepared	Moderately prepared	Moderately prepared	Moderately prepared	Good level of preparation	Good level of preparation
2. Internal Market	1. Free Movement of Goods	Moderately prepared	Moderately prepared	Moderately prepared	Moderately prepared	Moderately prepared	Moderately prepared	Moderately prepared	Moderately prepared	Moderately prepared	Moderately prepared	Moderately prepared	Moderately prepared	Moderately prepared	Moderately prepared	Good level of preparation
2. Internal Market	2. Freedom of Movement For Workers	Early stage	Early stage	Early stage	Early stage	Early stage	Some level of preparation	Some level of preparation	Some level of preparation	Some level of preparation	Some level of preparation	Some level of preparation	Some level of preparation	Some level of preparation	Some level of preparation	Moderate / Good
2. Internal Market	3. Right of Establishment & Freedom To Provide Services	Further efforts needed	Moderately prepared	Considerable efforts needed	Moderately prepared	Moderately prepared	Moderately prepared	Moderately prepared	Moderately prepared	Moderately prepared	Moderately prepared	Moderately prepared	Moderately prepared	Moderately prepared	Good level of preparation	Good level of preparation
2. Internal Market	4. Free Movement of Capital	Some level of preparation	Further efforts needed	Moderately prepared	Moderately prepared	Moderately prepared	Moderately prepared	Moderately prepared	Moderately prepared	Moderately prepared	Moderately prepared	Moderately prepared	Moderately prepared	Moderately prepared	Good level of preparation	Good level of preparation
2. Internal Market	6. Company Law	Further efforts needed	Moderately prepared	Moderately prepared	Moderately prepared	Moderately prepared	Good level of preparation	Good level of preparation	Good level of preparation	Good level of preparation	Good level of preparation	Good level of preparation	Good level of preparation	Good level of preparation	Good / Well advanced	Good / Well advanced
2. Internal Market	7. Intellectual Property Law	Further efforts needed	Moderately prepared	Good level of preparation	Good level of preparation	Good level of preparation	Good level of preparation	Good level of preparation	Good level of preparation	Good level of preparation	Good level of preparation	Good level of preparation	Good level of preparation	Good / Well advanced	Well advanced	Well advanced
2. Internal Market	8. Competition Policy	Further efforts needed	Moderately prepared	Moderately prepared	Moderately prepared	Moderately prepared	Moderately prepared	Moderately prepared	Moderately prepared	Moderately prepared	Moderately prepared	Moderately prepared	Moderately prepared	Moderately prepared	Moderately prepared	Good level of preparation
2. Internal Market	9. Financial Services	Further efforts needed	Moderately prepared	Moderately prepared	Moderately prepared	Moderately prepared	Moderately prepared	Moderately prepared	Moderately prepared	Moderately prepared	Moderately prepared	Moderately prepared	Moderately prepared	Moderately prepared	Moderate / Good	Good level of preparation
2. Internal Market	28. Consumer & Health Protection	Further efforts needed	Moderately prepared	Moderately prepared	No major difficulties expected	Moderately prepared	Moderately prepared	Moderately prepared	Moderately prepared	Moderately prepared	Moderately prepared	Moderately prepared	Moderately prepared	Moderately prepared	Moderately prepared	Good level of preparation
3. Competitiveness; and inclusive growth	10. Information Society & Media	Moderately prepared	Moderately prepared	Further efforts needed	Moderately prepared	Moderately prepared	Moderately prepared	Moderately prepared	Moderately prepared	Moderately prepared	Moderately prepared	Moderately prepared	Moderately prepared	Good level of preparation	Good level of preparation	Good level of preparation
3. Competitiveness; and inclusive growth	16. Taxation	Further efforts needed	Early stage	Moderately prepared	Moderately prepared	Moderately prepared	Moderately prepared	Moderately prepared	Moderately prepared	Moderately prepared	Moderately prepared	Moderately prepared	Moderately prepared	Moderately prepared	Moderate / Good	Good level of preparation
3. Competitiveness; and inclusive growth	17. Economic & Monetary Policy	Considerable efforts needed	Moderately prepared	Moderately prepared	Moderately prepared	Moderately prepared	Moderately prepared	Moderately prepared	Moderately prepared	Moderately prepared	Moderately prepared	Moderately prepared	Moderately prepared	Moderately prepared	Moderately prepared	Good level of preparation
3. Competitiveness; and inclusive growth	19. Social Policy & Employment	Early stage	Considerable efforts needed	Further efforts needed	Early stage	Some level of preparation	Some level of preparation	Some level of preparation	Some level of preparation	Some level of preparation	Some level of preparation	Some level of preparation	Some level of preparation	Some level of preparation	Some / Moderate	Good level of preparation
3. Competitiveness; and inclusive growth	20. Enterprise & Industrial Policy	Considerable efforts needed	Further efforts needed	Moderately prepared	Moderately prepared	Moderately prepared	Moderately prepared	Moderately prepared	Moderately prepared	Moderate / Good	Moderate / Good	Moderate / Good	Moderate / Good	Good level of preparation	Good level of preparation	Good / Well advanced
3. Competitiveness; and inclusive growth	25. Science & Research	Moderately prepared	Further efforts needed	Good level of preparation	Good level of preparation	Good level of preparation	Good level of preparation	Good level of preparation	Good level of preparation	Good level of preparation	Good level of preparation	Good level of preparation	Good level of preparation	Good level of preparation	Good level of preparation	Good level of preparation
3. Competitiveness; and inclusive growth	26. Education & Culture	Moderately prepared	Moderately prepared	Moderately prepared	Good level of preparation	Good level of preparation	Good level of preparation	Good level of preparation	Good level of preparation	Good level of preparation	Good level of preparation	Good level of preparation	Good level of preparation	Good level of preparation	Good level of preparation	Good level of preparation
3. Competitiveness; and inclusive growth	29. Customs Union	Further efforts needed	Moderately prepared	Moderately prepared	Moderately prepared	Moderately prepared	Moderately prepared	Moderately prepared	Moderately prepared	Moderately prepared	Moderately prepared	Moderately prepared	Moderately prepared	Moderately prepared	Moderately prepared	Good level of preparation
4. Green agenda; and sustainable connectivity	14. Transport Policy	Further efforts needed	Moderately prepared	Moderately prepared	Moderately prepared	Moderately prepared	Good level of preparation	Good level of preparation	Good level of preparation	Moderate / Good	Moderate / Good	Moderate / Good	Moderate / Good	Moderate / Good	Moderate / Good	Good level of preparation
4. Green agenda; and sustainable connectivity	15. Energy	Moderately prepared	Early stage	Moderately prepared	Moderately prepared	Moderately prepared	Good level of preparation	Good level of preparation	Good level of preparation	Good level of preparation	Good level of preparation	Good level of preparation	Good level of preparation	Good level of preparation	Good level of preparation	Good level of preparation
4. Green agenda; and sustainable connectivity	21. Trans-European Networks	Further efforts needed	Early stage	Moderately prepared	Moderately prepared	Moderately prepared	Moderately prepared	Moderately prepared	Moderately prepared	Moderate / Good	Moderate / Good	Moderate / Good	Moderate / Good	Moderate / Good	Moderate / Good	Good level of preparation
4. Green agenda; and sustainable connectivity	27. Environment & Climate Change	Considerable efforts needed	Early stage	Early stage	Early stage	Early stage	Some level of preparation	Some level of preparation	Some level of preparation	Some level of preparation	Some level of preparation	Some level of preparation	Some level of preparation	Some level of preparation	Some level of preparation	Moderately prepared
5. Resources, agriculture; and cohesion	11. Agriculture & Rural Development	Early stage	Early stage	Early stage	Early stage	Some level of preparation	Moderately prepared	Moderately prepared	Moderately prepared	Moderately prepared	Moderately prepared	Moderately prepared	Moderately prepared	Moderately prepared	Moderately prepared	Moderate / Good
5. Resources, agriculture; and cohesion	12. Food Safety, Veterinary & Phytosanitary Policy	Early stage	Early stage	Early stage	Early stage	Some level of preparation	Moderately prepared	Moderately prepared	Moderately prepared	Moderately prepared	Moderately prepared	Moderately prepared	Moderately prepared	Moderately prepared	Moderately prepared	Moderate / Good
5. Resources, agriculture; and cohesion	13. Fisheries	Further efforts needed	Early stage	Early stage	Early stage	Early stage	Early stage	Early stage	Some level of preparation	Some level of preparation	Some level of preparation	Some level of preparation	Some level of preparation	Some level of preparation	Moderately prepared	Good level of preparation
5. Resources, agriculture; and cohesion	22. Regional Policy & Coordination of Structural Instruments	Early stage	Considerable efforts needed	Early stage	Early stage	Moderately prepared	Moderately prepared	Moderately prepared	Moderately prepared	Moderately prepared	Moderately prepared	Moderately prepared	Moderately prepared	Moderately prepared	Moderately prepared	Good level of preparation
5. Resources, agriculture; and cohesion	33. Financial & Budgetary Provisions	Early stage	Early stage	Early stage	Early stage	Early stage	Early stage	Early stage	Early stage	Early stage	Some level of preparation	Some level of preparation	Some level of preparation	Some level of preparation	Some level of preparation	Moderately prepared
6. External relations	30. External Relations	Further efforts needed	Moderately prepared	Moderately prepared	No major difficulties expected	Good level of preparation	Good level of preparation	Good level of preparation	Good level of preparation	Good level of preparation	Good level of preparation	Good level of preparation	Good level of preparation	Good level of preparation	Good level of preparation	Good level of preparation
6. External relations	31. Foreign, Security & Defence Policy	Further efforts needed	Moderately prepared	Moderately prepared	No major difficulties expected	Good level of preparation	Good level of preparation	Good level of preparation	Good level of preparation	Good level of preparation	Good level of preparation	Good level of preparation	Good level of preparation	Good level of preparation	Well advanced	Well advanced
	34. Institutions	N/A	N/A	N/A	N/A	N/A	N/A	N/A	N/A	N/A	N/A	N/A	N/A	N/A	N/A	N/A
	35. Other Issues	N/A	N/A	N/A	N/A	N/A	N/A	N/A	N/A	N/A	N/A	N/A	N/A	N/A	N/A	N/A
Legend: Well advanced Good / Well advanced Good level of preparation Moderate / Good Moderately prepared Some / Moderate Some level of preparation Early stage / Some Early stage Legacy evaluations: No major difficulties expected Further efforts needed Considerable efforts needed

== Economy ==
=== Developmental Aid ===
Instrument for Pre-Accession Assistance

IPA I
€236 M
(2007–2013)

IPA II
€271 M
(2014–2020)

IPA III
c. €300 M
(2021-2027)

=== Unilateral euro adoption ===
Montenegro has no currency of its own. As a constituent republic of the Socialist Federal Republic of Yugoslavia following World War II, and later of the Federal Republic of Yugoslavia, Montenegro used the Yugoslav dinar as its official currency. In November 1999, the government of Montenegro unilaterally designated the Deutsche Mark as its co-official currency with the dinar, and on 1 January 2001 the dinar officially ceased to be a legal tender in Montenegro. When the euro was introduced and the Deutsche Mark yielded in 2002, Montenegro followed suit and began using the euro as well, with no objection from the European Central Bank (ECB).

The European Commission and the ECB have since voiced their discontent over Montenegro's unilateral use of the euro on several occasions. A statement attached to their Stabilisation and Association Agreement with the EU read: "unilateral introduction of the euro was not compatible with the Treaty." The EU insists on the strict adherence to convergence criteria (such as spending at least 2 years in the ERM II system) which are not negotiable before euro adoption, but have not intervened to stop the unilateral adoption of the euro by Montenegro in 2002. The issue is expected to be resolved through the negotiations process. The ECB has stated that the implications of unilateral euro adoption "would be spelled out at the latest in the event of possible negotiations on EU accession."

Diplomats have suggested that it is unlikely Montenegro will be forced to withdraw the euro from circulation in their country. Radoje Žugić, Montenegro's Minister of Finance, has stated that "it would be extremely economically irrational to return to our currency and then later to again go back to the euro." Instead, he hopes that Montenegro will be permitted to keep the euro and has promised "the government of Montenegro, will adopt some certain elements, which should fulfill the conditions for further use of the euro; such as adopting fiscal rules."

== Travel ==
=== Schengen Visa liberalisation process ===
On 1 January 2008, the visa facilitation and readmission agreements between Montenegro and the EU entered into force. Montenegro was added to the list of visa exempt nationals on 19 December 2009, allowing their citizens to enter the Schengen Area and Cyprus without a visa when traveling with biometric passports. The visa liberalisation process does not include travels to Ireland which, alongside the United Kingdom (which left the EU during Montenegro's accession process), operate the Common Travel Area for visas outside of the Schengen Area.

In 2027 citizens of Montenegro will be required to register on the EU's ETIAS before entering the Schengen area.

== Montenegro's foreign relations with EU member states ==
- Austria
- Belgium
- Bulgaria
- Croatia
- Cyprus
- Czech Republic
- Denmark
- Estonia
- Finland
- France
- Germany
- Greece
- Hungary
- (Republic of Ireland) Ireland
- Italy
- Latvia
- Lithuania
- Luxembourg
- Malta
- Netherlands
- Poland
- Portugal
- Romania
- Slovakia
- Slovenia
- Spain
- Sweden

== See also ==
- Potential accession of Albania to the European Union
- Potential accession of Bosnia and Herzegovina to the European Union
- Potential accession of Kosovo to the European Union
- Potential accession of North Macedonia to the European Union
- Potential accession of Serbia to the European Union
- Montenegro–NATO relations
- Yugoslavia–European Communities relations
