= Montenegro–Spain relations =

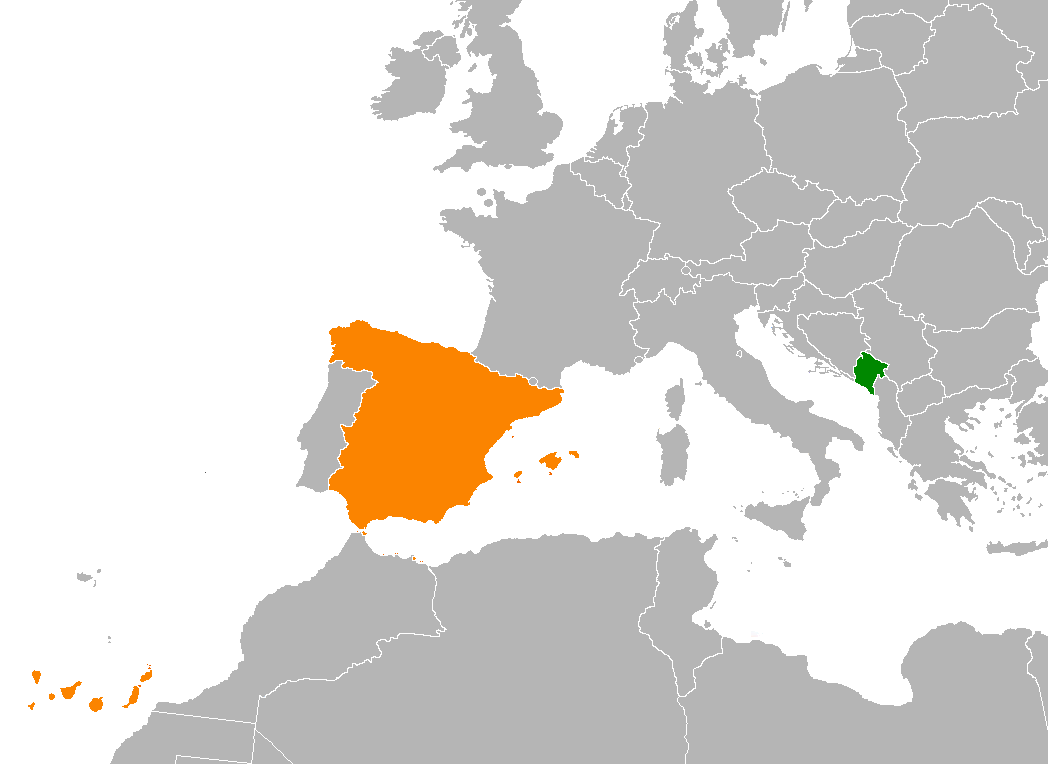

- Montenegro: Spain

Montenegro–Spain relations are the bilateral and diplomatic relations between these two countries. Both countries are full members of the Council of Europe, and of the NATO. Montenegro has an embassy in Madrid. Spain is accredited to Montenegro from its embassy in Belgrade, Serbia. Montenegro is a European Union candidate and Spain is a European Union member state.

== Diplomatic relations ==
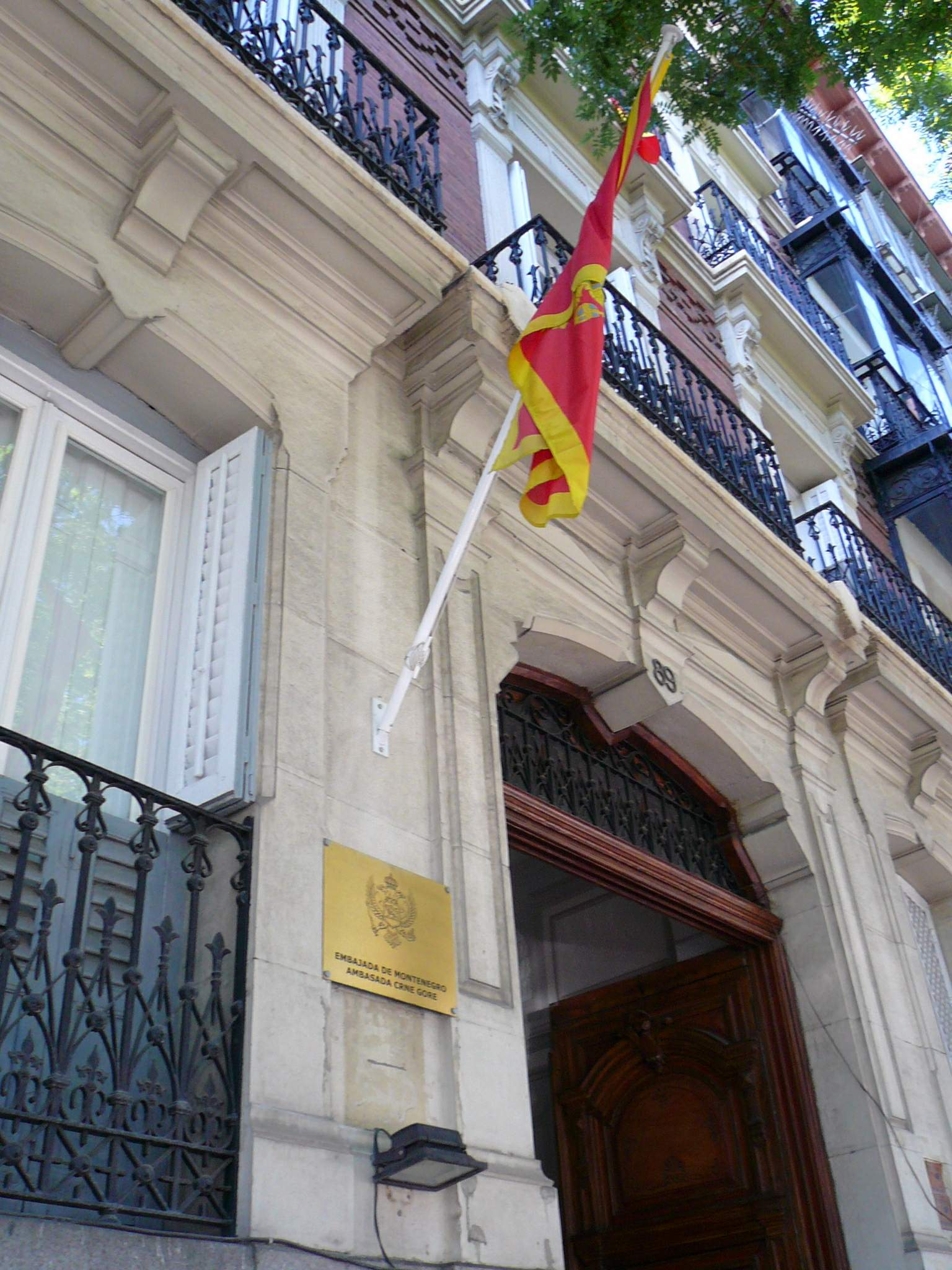
Embassy of Montenegro in Madrid

After the independence of Montenegro in June 2006, diplomatic relations were established on 11 December 2006, by exchanging letters between the respective Ministers of Foreign Affairs of Spain and Montenegro, Miguel Ángel Moratinos and Milan Rocen. Since that time, relations between the two countries have been excellent, without any contentious. On the other hand, Spain supports Montenegro's desire to integrate into the EU and into Euro-Atlantic security structures.

The proximity of positions and the interest in fostering relations are at the base of the negotiation and signing of a bilateral political declaration on May 19, 2011 on the occasion of the visit of the MAE Milan Rocen to Madrid and his interview with the Minister of Foreign Affairs Trinidad Jiménez. In December 2013, the first Ambassador of Montenegro in Spain, residing in Podgorica, Zeljko Perovic, delivered copies of his credentials to the MAEC.

In July 2022, Pedro Sánchez made the first visit to Montenegro by a Spanish prime minister. He endorsed Montenegro's EU accession negotiations and announced the upgrade of the Spanish diplomatic representation in Montenegro hitherto managed directly from Belgrade, by means of a resident chargé d'affaires.

== Economic relations ==
There is no specific institutional framework, bilateral relations are developed on the basis of agreements signed with the previous Federal Republic of Yugoslavia.

According to local statistics, Spanish exports to Montenegro during 2013 were €27.6 million, an increase of 8.2% compared to 2012. In the same year, imports from Montenegro amounted to just over €860,000, which is a very favorable balance of the bilateral trade balance for Spain.

Exchanges in the field of services are reduced In the field of tourism and transport, Montenegrin agencies They sell some vacation packages in Spain, preferably on the coast and in the Balearic Islands.

== Cooperation ==
Several regional strengthening projects were managed from the AECID Cooperation Technical Office in Sarajevo, closed in 2011. Of the rule of law, education, economic development, conflict prevention and peace building with execution in Montenegro.

One of the most important projects was “Support for the Secretariat of European Integration of Montenegro in the management of European funds”, training of Montenegrin institutions in cross-border cooperation, carried out through the International and Ibero-American Foundation for Administration and Public Policies (FIIAPP) in collaboration with the Secretariat of European Integration of Montenegro.

There was financing of a sustainable tourism development project in the Prokletije Region executed by World Wildlife Fund Med Po and local ONGDs.

== Resident diplomatic missions ==
- Montenegro has an embassy in Madrid.
- Spain is accredited to Montenegro from its embassy in Belgrade, Serbia.

== See also ==
- Foreign relations of Montenegro
- Foreign relations of Spain
- Accession of Montenegro to the EU
- NATO-EU relations
- Spain–Yugoslavia relations
