= Croatia–Montenegro relations =

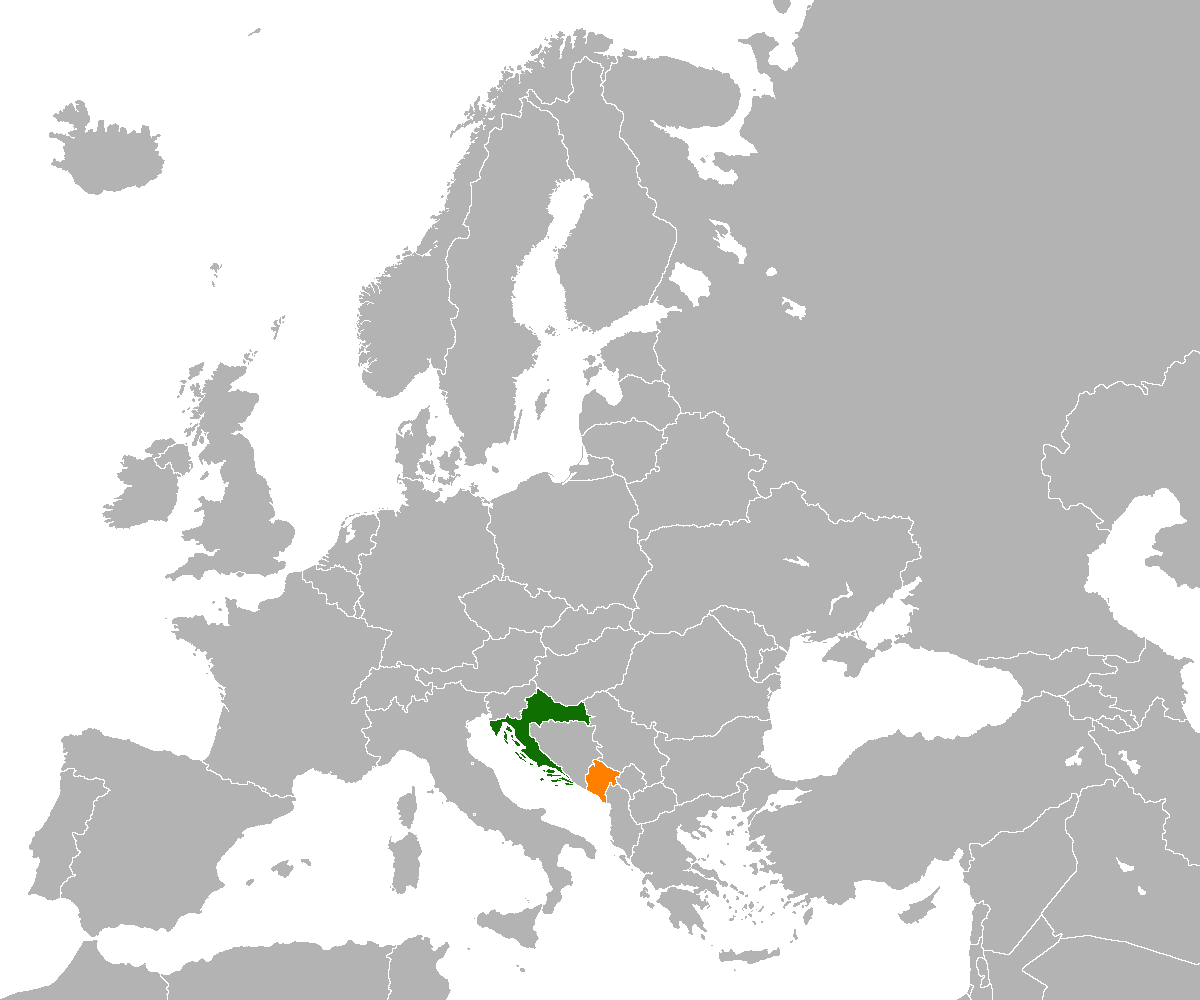

- Croatia: Montenegro

Diplomatic mission
- Embassy of Croatia in Podgorica, Montenegro: Embassy of Montenegro in Zagreb, Croatia

Foreign relations between Croatia and Montenegro are bound together by shared history, intellectual development, and common geography. Both states are members of the Council of Europe. Montenegro has been a candidate to join the European Union since 2012, a pursuit supported by Croatia, who has been an EU member since 2013. Their diplomatic relations have been largely amicable, with strong economic collaboration. Croatia and Montenegro are military allies through NATO. Montenegro's historic ties to Serbia routinely complicate trilateral relations with Croatia.

== History ==
In late 2002, Croatia and Serbia and Montenegro adopted an interim agreement to settle the disputed Prevlaka peninsula at the entrance of the Bay of Kotor in Croatia's favour, allowing the withdrawal of the UN monitoring mission. This agreement has applied to Montenegro since its independence, who agreed to settle future possible disputes in the International Court of Justice. In 2000, Montenegrin president Milo Đukanović issued a formal apology to the Croatian government for the shelling of Dubrovnik in 1991, which Croatia accepted as part of broader warming of relations.

Croatia recognized the independence of Montenegro on June 12, 2006, establishing diplomatic relations on July 7, 2006. Both Croatia and Montenegro have supported the 2008 independence of Kosovo from Serbia, jointly recognizing it as an independent country. Relations between the Croatia and Montenegro are promoted through the Croatian-Montenegrin Friendship Society "Croatica-Montenegrina". Montenegrin and Croatian, official languages of Montenegro and Croatia respectively, are mutually intelligible standard varieties of the Serbo-Croatian language. During the COVID-19 outbreak in Europe, Croatia supplied medical equipment to Montenegro in a form of medical diplomacy.

=== Croatia's stance on Montenegro's accession of to the European Union ===
In June 2024, the Montenegrin parliament adopted a resolution recognizing the World War II-era Jasenovac concentration camp as a genocidal operation. Led by pro-Serbia political parties in Montenegro, it was seen as a counter-response to Montenegro's support for the United Nations resolution on the Serbian-led Srebrenica genocide that was passed in May. Croatia sanctioned three Montenegrin politicians that year and temporarily excluded Montenegro from a Croatian defense pact with Albania and Kosovo in 2025. The European Commission noted Montenegro's strained relations with Croatia as a challenge for Montenegrin accession into the EU. In exchange for Croatian support of Montenegrin accession, Croatia has requested resolution on key issues. This includes formal delineation of the Prevlaka border, a return of the Jadran ship to the Croatian Navy, formal acknowledgment of the Morinj detention camp, and educational equality for the Croatian minority in Montenegro. The Croatian government has cautioned against Serbian and Russian influence in Montenegrin politics, calling it disruptive to otherwise amicable bilateral relations.

Following the death of Ratko Mladić, Andrija Mandić, President of the Parliament of Montenegro and leader of the New Serb Democracy party, expressed condolences to Darko Mladić. The speaker of the Croatian Parliament, Gordan Jandroković, condemned the expression of condolences and said that Montenegro cannot count on Croatia's support for its EU accession as long as leaders of Montenegrin institutions continue to make such statements. The Ministry of Foreign and European Affairs also condemned the expression of condolences calling it "unacceptable".

=== Economy ===
Croatia is one of Montenegro's primary sources of oil imports.

=== Border dispute ===
Ever since the Badinter Commission ruled that existing Yugoslav borders could not be changed unilaterally, Montenegro has disputed its land border with Croatia established with geodetic data in 1992, ever since the then Serbia and Montenegro attempted to move Montenegro's border to the Neretva river. While Montenegro does not claim all the territory to the Neretva they disagree with Croatia on the exact course of 94% of their border disputing some ~220 square meters of territory not including Prevlaka at the mouth of the Bay of Kotor.

== Embassies ==
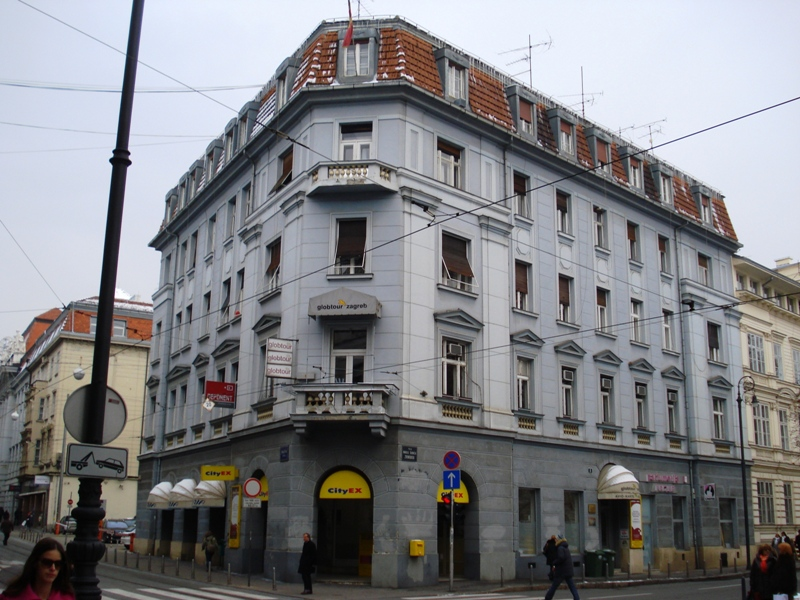
Embassy of Montenegro in Zagreb

- Croatia: embassy in Podgorica and a consulate-general in Kotor.
- Montenegro: embassy in Zagreb.

== Border crossings ==
There are only 2 border crossing points on the border between Croatia and Montenegro:

- Karasovići (HRV) / Debeli Brijeg (MNE)
- Vitaljina (HRV) / Kobila (MNE)

== See also ==
- Foreign relations of Croatia
- Foreign relations of Montenegro
- Montenegrins of Croatia
- Croats of Montenegro
- Potential accession of Montenegro to the European Union
