= Denmark–Montenegro relations =

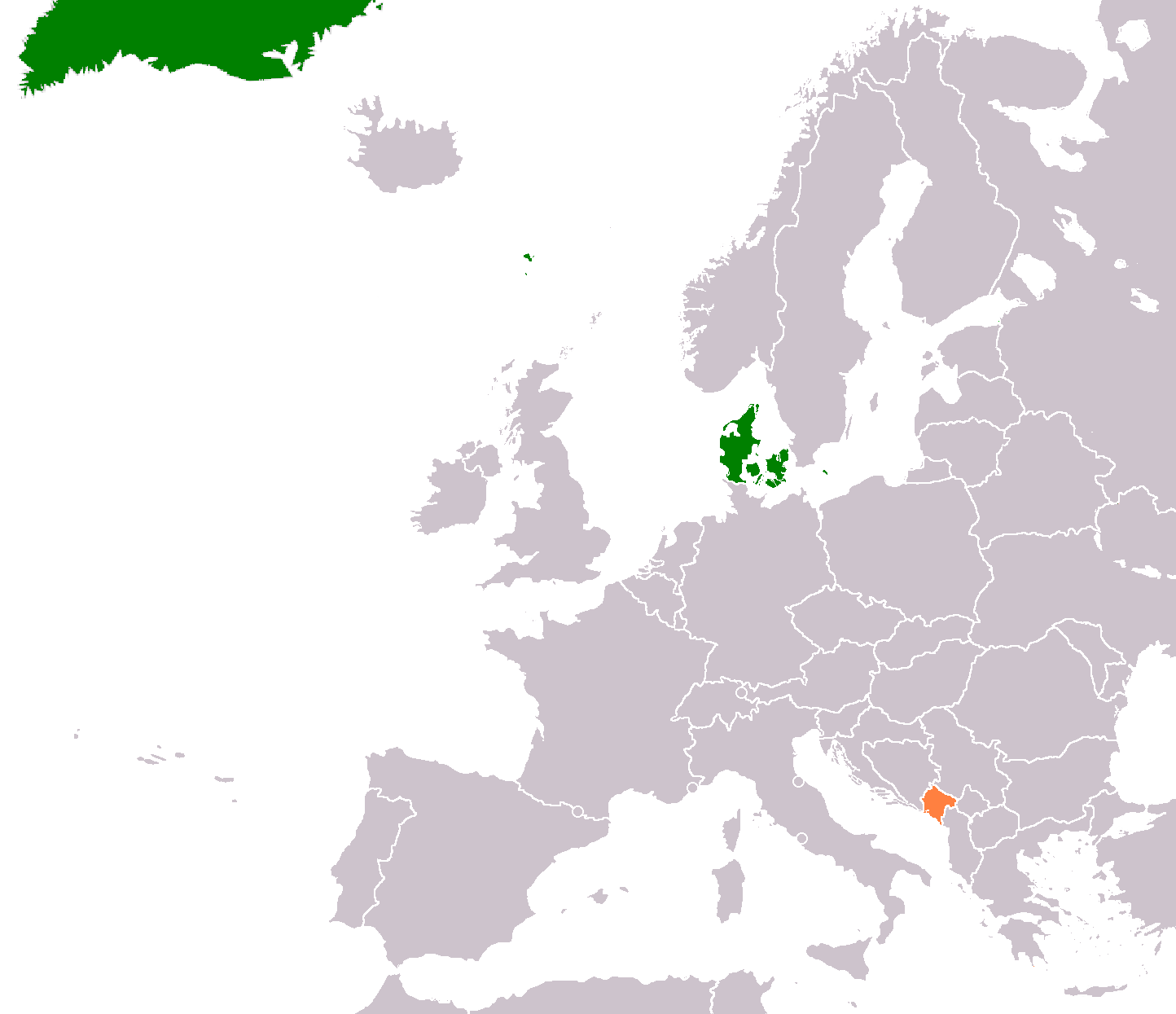

- Denmark: Montenegro

Denmark–Montenegro relations refers to the current and historical relations between Denmark and Montenegro. Denmark is represented in Montenegro through its embassy in Belgrade, Serbia, and have an honorary consulate in Podgorica. Montenegro is represented in Denmark through its embassy in Belgrade, Serbia. Both countries are full members of the Council of Europe and NATO. Denmark is also an EU member and Montenegro is an EU candidate. Denmark recognized Montenegro on 15 June 2006 and diplomatic relations were established same day. Denmark assists Montenegro under the Neighborhood Programme. The assistance focuses on agricultural production. Both countries have signed an agreement about protection of investments.

Denmark supports Accession of Montenegro to the EU. In 2012, the Danish Foreign Minister Villy Søvndal stressed: "Denmark supports [the] integration of the Western Balkan countries which would result in a more safe and a more united Europe, as well as that it would continue arguing for the principle of individual assessment of the countries which aspire to become members of the EU."

== Resident diplomatic missions ==
- Denmark is accredited to Montenegro from its embassy in Belgrade, Serbia and an honorary consulate in Podgorica.
- Montenegro has an embassy in Copenhagen.

== See also ==
- Foreign relations of Denmark
- Foreign relations of Montenegro
- Accession of Montenegro to the EU
- NATO-EU relations
- Nicholas I of Montenegro
- Vida Ognjenović
