= Greece–Montenegro relations =

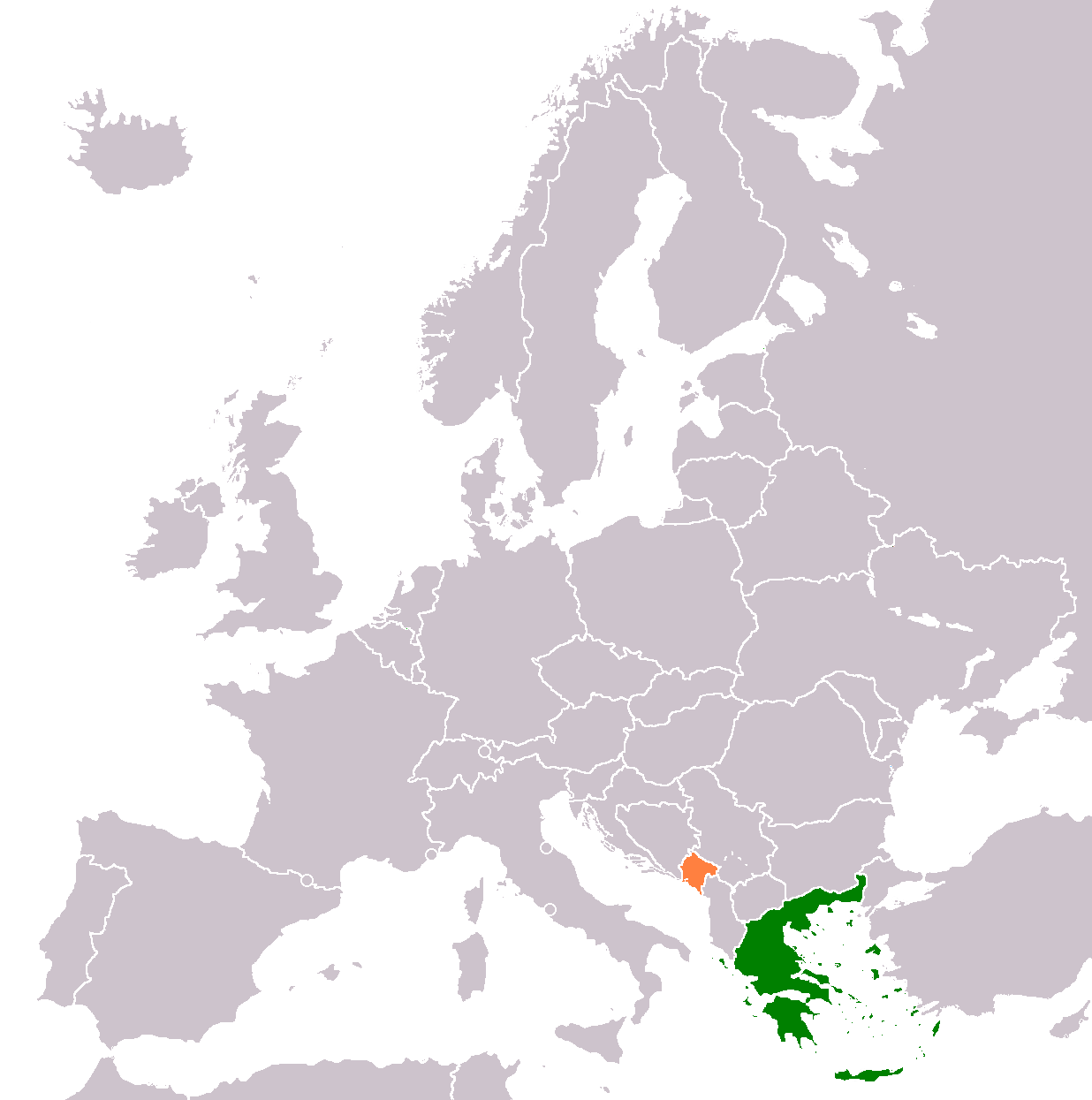

- Greece: Montenegro

Greece–Montenegro relations are foreign relations between Greece and Montenegro.

Montenegro has an embassy in Athens. Greece has an embassy in Podgorica. Both countries are full members of the Council of Europe, and of the NATO. Greece is an EU member, while Montenegro is an EU candidate. Greece supports the Accession of Montenegro to the European Union.

== History ==
Relations between the Principality of Montenegro and the Kingdom of Greece officially started in 1881. The countries' relations were excellent especially during the Balkan Wars and World War I.

Greece recognized Montenegro on 13 June 2006. Both countries established diplomatic relations on 18 December of that year.

Greece is one of Montenegro's primary sources of oil imports.

In 2020, Ivan Vuković, mayor of Podgorica, vowed to strengthen relations between the two countries. This came during the COVID-19 pandemic.

In 2021, Zdravko Krivokapić, prime minister of Montenegro established a consulate in Thessaloniki, headed by Vassili Apostolopoulos.

The Montenegrin mafia operates in Greece. Greek and Montenegrin officials have worked together to combat various gangs. In 2024, two suspects for nine felonies and seven misdemeanors, in particular regarding killings of Greek mafia members.

In 2025, Greek Minister of Culture Lina Mendoni visited Montenegro, where she met with Minister of Culture and Media Tamara Vujović. The meeting regarded agreements which had been signed between Greece and Montenegro the year prior. Mendoni also used the meeting as an opportunity to emphasize the historic and cultural ties between the two countries.

In July 2026, Greece signed a defense agreement with Montenegro.

== Resident diplomatic missions ==
Greece has an embassy in Podgorica. Montenegro has an embassy in Athens.

== See also ==
- Foreign relations of Greece
- Foreign relations of Montenegro
- Accession of Montenegro to the EU
- NATO-EU relations
- Greece–Yugoslavia relations
