= Belgium–Montenegro relations =

- Belgium: Montenegro

Belgium–Montenegro relations are the bilateral and diplomatic relations between these two countries. Both countries are full members of the Council of Europe and of NATO. Montenegro has an embassy in Brussels Belgium is accredited to Montenegro from its embassy in Belgrade, Serbia. Montenegro is a European Union candidate and Belgium is a European Union member state.
