= Italy–Montenegro relations =

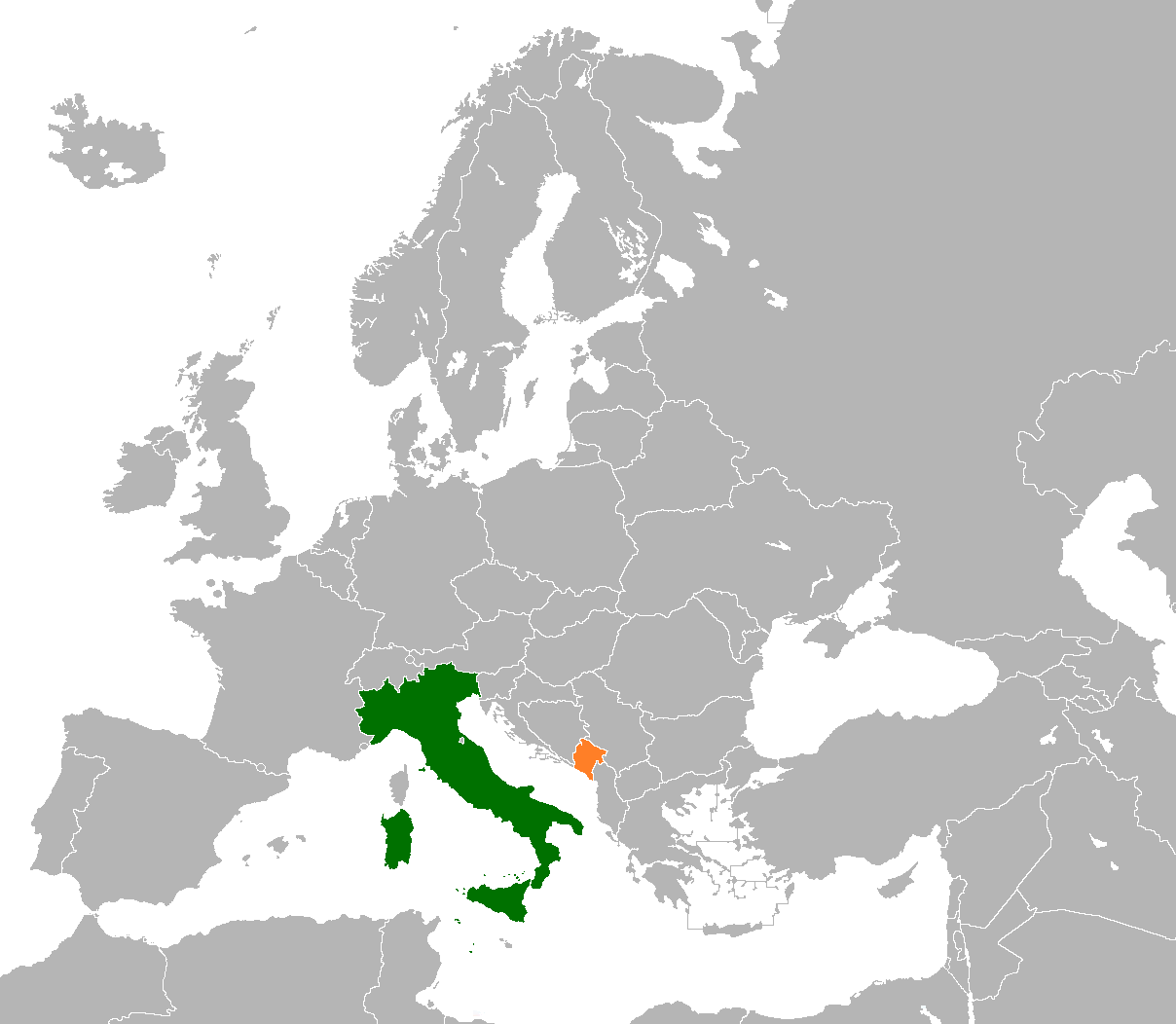

- Italy: Montenegro

Italy and Montenegro have cultivated a robust and multifaceted bilateral relationship since establishing diplomatic ties on 3 June 2006, following Italy's recognition of Montenegro's independence. This partnership spans political, economic, defense, and cultural domains, underpinned by shared membership in international organizations such as NATO, the Council of Europe, and the Union for the Mediterranean. Despite partnerships in various sectors, contrasting relations between the two countries have also been highlighted.

== Historical background ==
Italy–Montenegro relations can be described through three different periods that the relationship went through. During the medieval period, the Venetian Republic exercised control of the Adriatic. From the 15th century to the 18th century, coastal cities like Kotor, Budva, and the port town of Bar were under Venetian occupation. This period allowed for cultural exchange, including architectural, legal, and artistic influences. Montenegro's Adriatic coast bears the influence of Venetian architecture, governance systems, and maritime trade. The second phase is about Italy's role in the Balkan region during the 19th century and early 20th century. Montenegro's strategic location drew the interest of Italy during the Balkan Wars (1912–1913) as it sought to expand its influence in the region. During World War I, Montenegro was allied with Italy, but tensions arose after the establishment of the Kingdom of Serbs, Croats, and Slovenes (later referred to as Yugoslavia). Italy's foreign policy toward Montenegro became part of its broader diplomatic strategy towards Yugoslavia, creating friction. Montenegro's sovereignty has undergone many transformations over the past century. Once an independent kingdom recognized in 1878, it lost its autonomy in 1918 when it was incorporated into the Kingdom of Serbs, Croats, and Slovenes. Despite being one of the six republics in socialist Yugoslavia, Montenegro’s foreign policy was controlled by the federal government. Following the breakup of Yugoslavia in the 1990s, it remained in a union with Serbia until 2006.

After the Tripartite Pact of September 1940, Italy occupied Montenegro from 1941 to 1943 as part of its fascist expansionist ambitions under Benito Mussolini. The occupation faced widespread resistance from Montenegrin partisans. Following Italy's surrender in 1943, German forces took over until the end of the war. After World War II, Italy shifted from aggression to diplomacy, especially during the Cold War. Diplomatic relations were established on the intergovernmental level after Montenegro's independence from Yugoslavia in 2006. Modern bilateral relations encompass various agreements in areas such as legal, economic, and political cooperation, continuing to evolve to this day.

== Diplomatic relations and agreements ==
Diplomatic relations between Italy and Montenegro were fully established in Italy's acknowledgment of Montenegro's independence. After Montenegro's independence referendum of 2006, Montenegro's relationship strengthened with Italy, and Italy became a key partner in international organizations and the international political scene, along with becoming an important factor for achieving Montenegro's foreign policy goals, as well as for its internal development. Italy has supported Montenegro's administrative and capital legal reforms that are critical to membership, helping Montenegro's accession to the European Union. One of them is Italian support for judicial and economic reforms in Montenegro. Thus, Montenegro eventually accepted the NATO invitation and became an official member in 2017. Italian military cooperation with Montenegro includes joint military exercise programs, training initiatives, and intelligence-sharing agreements. Relations are broadly positive, and there have been flare-ups over trade policies and maritime boundaries.

== Economic and trade relations ==
Italy is one of Montenegro's key trading partners, where the Italian regions of Molise and Montenegro have considerable affinity and use the cooperation to renew their economy through, for example, cross-border cooperation to modernize the agricultural sector and strengthen tourism. Economic ties also include energy resources, trade, tourism, and infrastructure development. This cooperation is visible in energy. Italian companies have invested in Montenegro's energy sector, from hydroelectric plants to wind-power projects. Italy has pledged to invest in renewable energy projects and also partner with Montenegrin companies to implement renewable energy targets. Italian energy companies, including Enel, settled in Montenegro to expand electricity exports to the European market. Another area of economic interaction is tourism. Montenegro's Adriatic seacoast is a preferred location among Italian tourists, and other tourism-related investments from Italy have helped develop Montenegro's hospitality sector. Italian investment in Montenegro's tourism and its economic benefits are a result of these interactions. Economic relations also involve critical infrastructure development. Italian construction and engineering firms have worked on Montenegro's major projects, including the construction of road networks and port expansions, where local talent must be absorbed.

== Cultural and educational dependence ==
The historical and cultural affiliations between Italy and Montenegro have led to their long-established cultural diffusion, the spread of cultural traits, like language, art, or customs, from one group to another through contact and interaction. The cultural heritage of a country links into the heart of a community, breathes the essence of a new life and reality amidst the histories and memories present throughout the centuries and millennia.

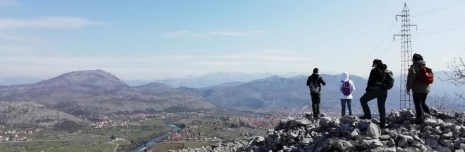
Italian researchers and Montenegrin researchers

Intervening in the cultural heritage of another country often risks the adaptation of a colonialist perspective towards the cultural heritage. However, the strong relationship witnessed between Italy and Montenegro has been strengthened further by this project, Doclea. There has been a cross-fertilization of potencies identified in the continuous exchanges between Italian researchers and Montenegrin researchers (refer to image 1). This collaboration has positively resulted in work on site, joint participation in international conferences, promoting projects to the general public, and others. International exchanges of knowledge and enhancement in cultural heritage are identified. Cultural relations have been worked through linguistic exchanges as well. Montenegrin dialect on the coast has somewhat absorbed Italian, and the number of Italian loanwords reflects this proximity. Montenegro's agreements with Italy have included educational cooperation between the two countries, such as in the domain of student false brotherhoods between Italian and Montenegrin universities. Montenegrin students can study in Italy through government scholarship programs. And how such programs help strengthen bilateral relations will be explored in this segment. The Italian Cultural Institute in Podgorica oversees the promotion and teaching of Montenegro's Italian language and culture.

== Potential energy partnership ==
The relationship between Italy and Montenegro can be identified through the lens of the potential energy framework. An electrical bridge was introduced for the first time between the Balkans and Europe. Terna was the longest undersea cable that enabled Italy to exercise power as a European and Mediterranean electricity transmission hub. The whole infrastructure was strategically planned in terms of power interconnection to link the two countries, Italy and Montenegro.

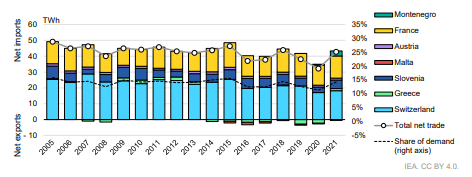
Italy's electricity imports and exports

This collaborative project contributed to improving Italy-Montenegro relations by ensuring that better electricity is transmitted from South East Europe to Italy. Modern technical solutions were chosen to manage the high-power cable connection established between Italy and Montenegro. This has signalled the presence of a long-term bilateral energy integration in the two countries. The technical platform, the Association of the Mediterranean Transmission System Operators (Med-TSO), was established in Rome for electricity by TSOs from 12 countries among the 19 countries. A shared membership was found, including both Italy and Montenegro. This collaboration aimed to integrate the Mediterranean Power Systems and foster regional security and socio-economic development. Contrarily, in terms of environmental policy, countries in the Adriatic region, including Italy and Montenegro, rank relatively low. The last financial crisis in Italy had diminished and devalued the environmental policy. Similarly, although a number of national environmental programs are identified in Montenegro to tackle biodiversity, it lacks funding and political stability. However, in the evolving energy landscape of Italy, interconnection capacity has increased, and new interconnecting lines have been constructed with countries including Montenegro. The Italian control over the thermoelectric station at Pljevlja has negatively impacted the Montenegrin environment as it burns locally mined lignite, releasing sulfur to the environment. Therefore, the relationship shared by Italy and Montenegro is mutually beneficial but asymmetrical on energy grounds. Italy plays a dominant role as an investor and technical partner, controlling Montenegro.

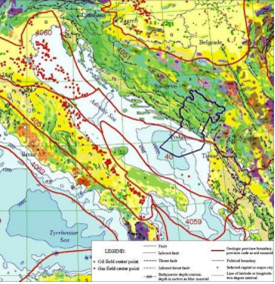
The Adriatic Sea between the Italian and Balkan peninsulas. Montenegro is outlined in black, and the expected oil provinces are in red

The exploitation and exploration of the rich resources of oil and gas fields surrounding the Adriatic Sea has been another matter of confrontation, particularly by Montenegro. Montenegro had provoked a reaction against the Government of Croatia, which wanted to exploit and explore the resources of the maritime area through foreign leaseholders. The Croatian agreement was simultaneously supported by the Italian government, leading to the formation of Exclusive Economic Zones (EEZs). Delimitation of the EEZs is yet to be successful as Montenegro has not proclaimed its own EEZ till now. The agreement of neighbouring states, such as Montenegro, is required by Italy to implement its EEZ. Although collaborations have been identified, they are not without environmental and dependency concerns.

== Contrasting strategies in natural resource use ==
The close relationship between Italy and Montenegro has been criticized by geologists. The Italian and Balkan peninsulas have different geological settings, although their origin is the same. The occurrence of large lakes is common in Italy and the Montenegro regions at a short distance from their coastlines. For instance, Varano in Italy and Skodar (Scutar), which crosses the border of Montenegro. Similarly, looking at the geomorphological pattern, additional differences can be identified. In the wide valleys of the Italian peninsula, the rivers flow down with an intermittent discharge due to the summer drought, while those in the steep valleys of the Balkan peninsula flow rapidly and constantly. The latter flows are much colder, like the Alpine streams. There is further presence of arch dams for barrage in the narrow but steep valleys of Montenegro that fill elongated reservoirs to catch water and produce hydroelectric power. On the other hand, the Italian dams are regulated and used mainly as reservoirs to catch rainwater during spring and winter. This water is then distributed during the dry summer days.

== Challenges and contemporary issues ==
Despite generally positive relations between Italy and Montenegro, certain obstacles still persist. Migration has been at the heart of one of the biggest issues in the 21st century. One such central issue in Italy–Montenegro relations is migration. In 2018, the two countries signed a memorandum of understanding to enhance cooperation on border management and combat irregular migration, especially at sea. This agreement aimed to address the challenges posed by increased migration flows through the Western Balkans route. Another aspect of this migration phenomenon is the movement of Montenegrin workers to neighboring Italy, making it the most important country of destination for migration, triggering discussions about labor rights and migration policies. Energy projects have also fueled tensions, with environmental concerns over projects and their ecological impact on the Adriatic Sea. Environmental groups in both countries had expressed concerns over pollution from some infrastructure and energy projects. Political challenges, including sporadic disagreements over economic policies, have also emerged. Individually, trade imbalances and regulatory divergences between Italy and Montenegro have sometimes provoked friction in negotiations.

== Evolving issue of migration ==
Migration has long been an important aspect of Italy–Montenegro relations, influencing the economic, cultural, and social interaction between the two nations. Apart from the historical migration pattern, the Montenegro diaspora in Italy reflected the labor mobility transformation within the framework of European Integration. The management of migration through labor agreements includes helping the diaspora communities, promoting mutual development, and bilateral collaboration. Throughout history, it has been seen that the issue of migration is intricately related to Montenegrin citizens. The United Nations statistics have found that the total stock of Montenegrin emigrants around the world increased from 148,982 to 153,009 between 2010 and 2019. Italy was one of the many popular countries where the highest number of Montenegrin immigrants was found. However, over the years, there has been a shift in the preference of migrating countries. In 2019, most residence permits for Montenegrin immigrants were found in countries such as Croatia and Slovenia. The inflows of migrants in the form of remittances were 86.6 million USD in 2007, whereas it was 96.6 million USD in 2011. Due to this, the European countries, especially Italy, became favorable destinations for Montenegrin workers. The geographic proximity of Italy, its connection to the Adriatic Sea, and the demand for labor contributed to this trend. Although Montenegro depends on remittances, they are not considered significant for long-term GDP growth. They provide short-term stability since they do not promote structural development. Thus, Italy acts as a remittance-sending nation. Remittances sent to the region decrease the poverty level, increase business investments, enhance human capital, and improve information and technology. This links with Italy-Montenegro relations, where Montenegrin migrants support the local economy in areas like tourism and small businesses. This also highlights the preservation of Montenegrin culture and language in Italy, focusing on mixed cultural and political identities. However, it additionally draws attention to the crime which connects to the diaspora, which is an important issue in the Adriatic region. Thus, it is a prevention related to cross-border crimes. It reviews diaspora dynamics, which serves as a framework for understanding the relationship between Montenegro and Italy, highlighting the advantages and challenges of this relationship.

== Resident diplomatic missions ==
- Italy has an embassy in Podgorica.
- Montenegro has an embassy in Rome.

== See also ==
- Foreign relations of Italy
- Foreign relations of Montenegro
- Accession of Montenegro to the EU
- Italy–Yugoslavia relations
