= Bulgaria–Montenegro relations =

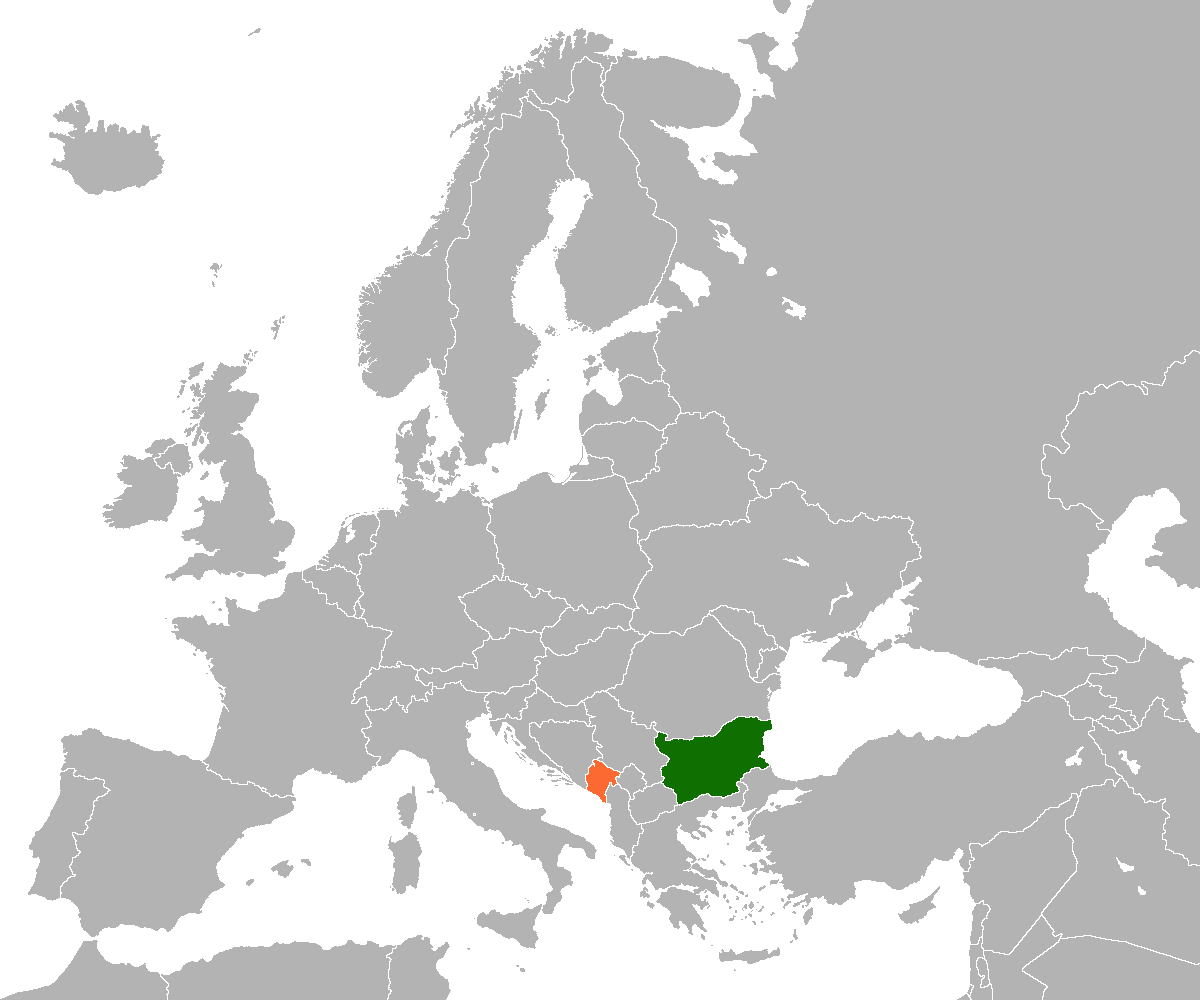

- Bulgaria: Montenegro

Bulgaria–Montenegro relations are foreign relations between Bulgaria and Montenegro. Relations between the two were originally established in 1896, while Montenegro had been a kingdom and Bulgaria had exercised special self-governing status while nominally part of the Ottoman Empire. Bulgaria recognized Montenegro on June 12, 2006. The modern countries established diplomatic relations on August 2, 2006. Both countries are full members of the Council of Europe, and of NATO. Bulgaria is an EU member and Montenegro is an EU candidate. Bulgaria fully supports Montenegro's accession process to the EU.

== Resident diplomatic missions ==
- Bulgaria has an embassy in Podgorica.
- Montenegro has an embassy in Sofia.

== See also ==
- Foreign relations of Bulgaria
- Foreign relations of Montenegro
- Accession of Montenegro to the European Union
- Bulgaria–Yugoslavia relations
