= Embassy of Ukraine, Podgorica =

Embassy of Ukraine in Montenegro

Embassy of Ukraine in Montenegro
- Location: Podgorica, Montenegro
- Address: 81000, Serdara Jola Piletica br. 15
- Coordinates: 42°27′04″N 19°15′32″E
- Ambassador: Nataliia Fiialka (Chargé d'affaires) since 2017
- Website: Official Website

Embassy of Ukraine in Podgorica (Ukrainian: Посольство України в Подгориці) is the diplomatic mission of Ukraine in Podgorica, Montenegro. Since October 2017 Chargé d'affaires of Ukraine in Podgorica is Nataliia Fiialka.

== History of the diplomatic relations ==
Ukraine recognized the independence of Montenegro on June 15, 2006. Diplomatic relations between two countries were established on August 22, 2006, by exchange of diplomatic notes. The embassy of Ukraine in Montenegro was opened in 2008.

== See also ==
- Montenegro–Ukraine relations
- List of diplomatic missions in Montenegro
- Foreign relations of Montenegro
- Foreign relations of Ukraine
