= List of ambassadors to Montenegro =

This is a list of ambassadors to Montenegro. Note that some ambassadors are responsible for more than one country while others are directly accredited to Podgorica.

== Current Residential Ambassadors to Montenegro ==
Sending country	Presentation of the credentials	Location of resident embassy	Ambassador
Albania	10.12.2014	Podgorica, Montenegro	Ernal Filo
Austria	08.12.2011	Podgorica, Montenegro	Martin Pammer
Bosnia and Herzegovina	27.06.2011	Podgorica, Montenegro	Izmir Talić
Bulgaria	2019	Podgorica, Montenegro	Meglena Plugchieva
China	14.12.2010	Podgorica, Montenegro	Zhi Zhaolin
Croatia	21.09.2012	Podgorica, Montenegro	Ivana Perić
European Union	24.07.2012	Podgorica, Montenegro	Mitja Drobnič
France	07.05.2010	Podgorica, Montenegro	Dominique Gazuy
Georgia	10.10.2019	Bar, Montenegro	Rade Vujačić
Germany	01.07.2014	Podgorica, Montenegro	Gudrun Steinacker
Greece	14.12.2010	Podgorica, Montenegro	Emmanuel Papadogiorgakis
Hungary	26.01.2010	Podgorica, Montenegro	Tibor Csaszar
Italy	11.02.2009	Podgorica, Montenegro	Sergio Barbanti
North Macedonia	28.07.2010	Podgorica, Montenegro	Aleksandar Vasilevski
Poland	24.11.2011	Podgorica, Montenegro	Grażyna Sikorska
Romania	17.09.2007	Podgorica, Montenegro	Mihail Florovici
Russia	14.04.2011	Podgorica, Montenegro	Aleksej Nesterenko
Serbia	06.03.2008	Podgorica, Montenegro	Zoran Lutovac
Slovakia	19.5.2020	Podgorica, Montenegro	Boris Gandel
Slovenia	06.10.2011	Podgorica, Montenegro	Vladimir Gasparič
Sovereign Military Order of Malta	30.03.2007	Podgorica, Montenegro	Enricco Tuccillo
Turkey	19.06.2012	Podgorica, Montenegro	Mehmet Niyazi Tanılır
Ukraine	22.12.2008	Podgorica, Montenegro	Oksana Slyusarenko
United Arab Emirates	06.10.2010	Podgorica, Montenegro	Hafsa Abdulla Mohamed Sharif Al Ulama
United Kingdom	19.09.2013	Podgorica, Montenegro	Dawn McKen
United States of America	20.12.2018	Podgorica, Montenegro	Judy Rising Reinke

== Current Non-residential Ambassadors to Montenegro ==
Sending country	Presentation of the credentials	Location of resident embassy	Ambassador
Algeria	26.01.2009	Belgrade, Serbia	Abdelkader Mesdoua
Argentina	09.11.2007	Budapest, Hungary	Domingo Santiago Cullen
Australia	06.10.2010	Belgrade, Serbia	Helena Gay Studdert
Azerbaijan	06.10.2010	Bucharest, Romania	Eldar Humbat oglu Hasanov
Belgium	14.04.2011	Belgrade, Serbia	Alain Kundycki
Brazil	14.06.2011	Belgrade, Serbia	Alexandre Addor Neto
Burundi		Rome, Italy	Ernest Ndabashinze
Canada	06.10.2011	Belgrade, Serbia	Roman Waschuk
Cuba	26.01.2010	Belgrade, Serbia	Mercedes Martinez Valdes
Cyprus	21.09.2012	Belgrade, Serbia	Nafsika Chr. Krousti
Czech Republic	16.05.2008	Belgrade, Serbia	Hana Hubáčková
Denmark	19.09.2007	Belgrade, Serbia	Mette Kjuel Nielsen
Ecuador	21.09.2012	Rome, Italy	Carlos Danilo Vallejo Lopez
Egypt	06.10.2011	Prague, Czech Republic	Mohamed Abdel Hakam
Estonia	21.12.2012	Tel Aviv, Israel	Arti Hilpus
Finland	18.11.2011	Belgrade, Serbia	Pekka Orpana
Georgia	06.10.2011	Budapest, Hungary	Zviad Chuburidze
Holy See	17.12.2012	Sarajevo, Bosnia and Hercegovina	Luigi Pezzuto
Iceland	16.11.2010	Berlin, Germany	Gunnar Snorri Gunnarsson
India	30.08.2010	Vienna, Austria	Ramachandran Swaminathan
Indonesia	25.03.2011	Budapest, Hungary	Maruli Tua Sagala
Iran	06.10.2010	Belgrade, Serbia	Abolghassem Delfi
Iraq	18.05.2012	Belgrade, Serbia	Falaha Abdulhasana Abdulsade
Ireland	15.02.2013	Budapest, Hungary	Kevin Dowling
Israel	06.10.2011	Belgrade, Serbia	Yossef Levy
Japan	28.04.2009	Belgrade, Serbia	Toshio Tsunozaki
Jordan	15.02.2013	Athens, Greece	Saker Malkawi
Kazakhstan	15.02.2008	Budapest, Hungary	Rashid Ibrayev
Kuwait	15.02.2013	Belgrade, Serbia	Fawzi Abdulaziz Ahmad Al-Jasem
Laos	18.05.2012	Vienna, Austria	Khamkheuang Bounteum
Latvia	01.09.2008	Budapest, Hungary	Veronika Erte
Lithuania	13.06.2011	Budapest, Hungary	Renatas Juška
Luxembourg	20.01.2012	Luxembourg, Luxembourg	Léon Delvaux
Malta	07.05.2010	La Valletta, Malta	Joseph Psaila Savona
Mexico	21.10.2009	Belgrade, Serbia	Mercedes Felicitas Ruiz Zapata
Moldova	14.06.2011	Bucharest, Romania	Jurij Renita
Morocco	18.05.2012	Belgrade, Serbia	Abdellah Zegour
Netherlands	16.11.2010	Belgrade, Serbia	Joost Reintjes
North Korea	18.11.2011	Sofia, Bulgaria	Ju Wang Hwan
North Macedonia	28.07.2010	Podgorica, Montenegro	Aleksandar Vasilevski
Norway	16.11.2010	Belgrade, Serbia	Nils Ragnar Kamsvag
Pakistan	07.05.2010	Budapest, Hungary	Qasim Raza Muttaqi
Palestine	21.01.2008	Belgrade, Serbia	Adham Abomadalala
Peru	07.05.2010	Bucharest, Romania	Ernesto Pinto-Bazurco Rittler
Portugal	24.07.2012	Belgrade, Serbia	Maria do Carmo de Sousa Pinto Allegro de Magalhaes
Qatar	21.01.2008	Rome, Italy	Soltan Saad Al-Moraikhi
South Africa	06.10.2011	Athens, Greece	Sophonia Rapulane Makgetla
South Korea	08.11.2011	Belgrade, Serbia	Kim Kwang-Keun
Spain	20.01.2012	Belgrade, Serbia	Iñigo De Palacio España
Sweden	15.08.2024	Belgrade, Serbia	Charlotte Sammelin
Switzerland	21.12.2012	Belgrade, Serbia	Jean-Daniel Ruch
Thailand	06.10.2011	Budapest, Hungary	Krit Kraichitti
Vietnam	03.09.2009	Bucharest, Romania	Nguyen Quang Chien

== See also ==
- Foreign relations of Montenegro
- List of diplomatic missions of Montenegro
- List of diplomatic missions in Montenegro
