= Montenegro–Ukraine relations =

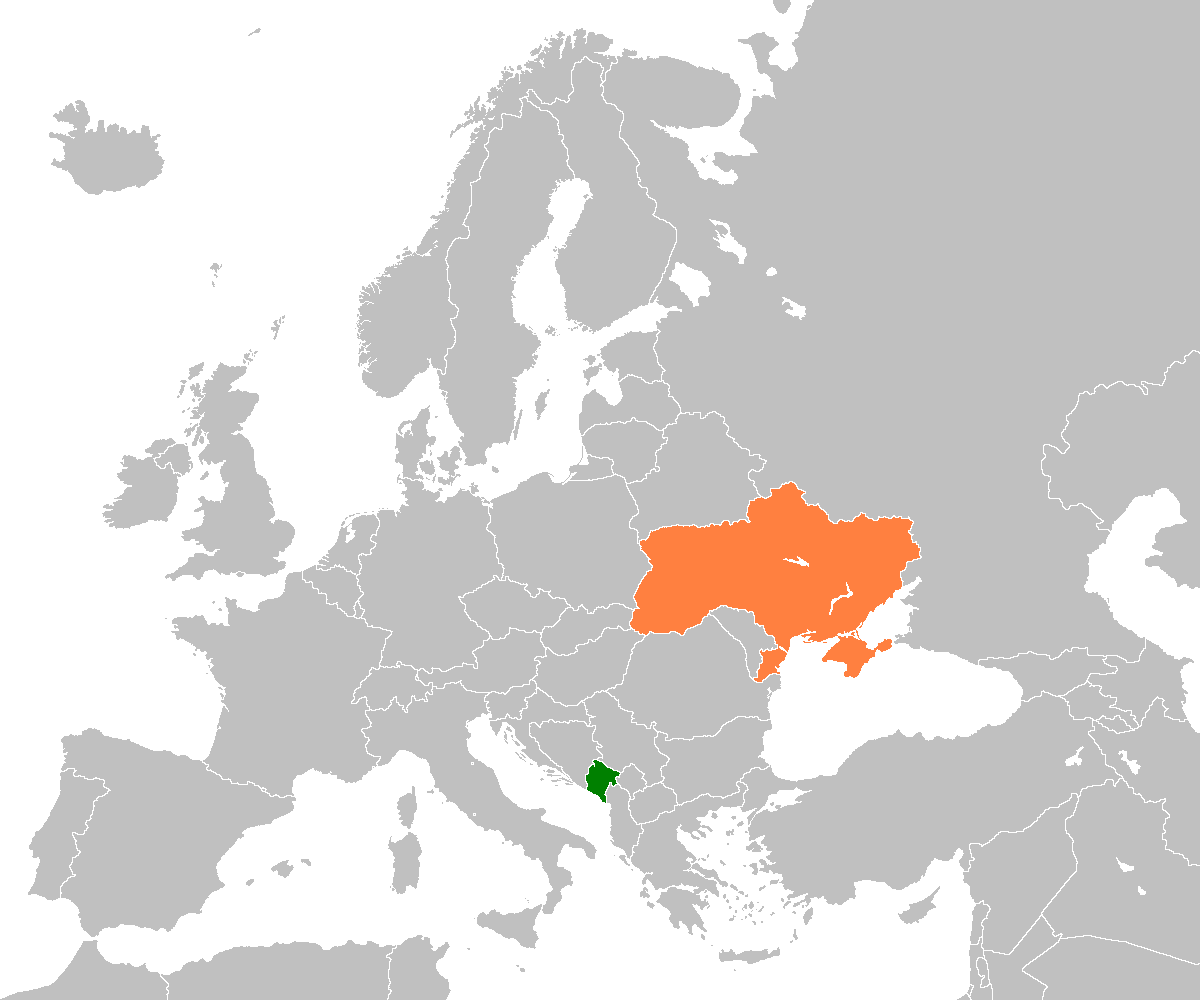

- Montenegro: Ukraine

Montenegro–Ukraine relations relate to bilateral relations between Montenegro and Ukraine. Formal relations began on 15 June 2006 when Ukraine recognized Montenegro, less than two weeks after the Parliament of Montenegro declared the independence of Montenegro from Serbia. Both countries established diplomatic relations on 22 August 2006. Montenegro has an embassy in Kyiv. Ukraine has an embassy in Podgorica. Although economic ties are weak, Montenegro is a transit point for human trafficking between Ukraine and the rest of Europe. Montenegro is a member of NATO, which Ukraine applied for in 2022. Ukraine is a member of the BSCE, with Montenegro being a sectoral dialogue partner.

== Official visits and statements ==
In 2006, Montenegrin President Filip Vujanović visited President of Ukraine Victor Yushchenko. In October 2008, Professor Željko Radulović, Ambassador Extraordinary and Plenipotentiary of Montenegro to Ukraine, presented his letters of credence to the Ukrainian president. In December 2008, the Ukrainian non-resident extraordinary and plenipotentiary ambassador Anatoliy Oliynyk was dismissed and replaced by Oksana Slyusarenko. In February 2009, the Montenegrin Deputy Prime Minister and the Minister of Finance, Igor Lukšić met Oksana Slysarenko and discussed common interests including banking and economic cooperation.

In July 2009, on Montenegro's third anniversary as an independent state, President of Ukraine Victor Yushchenko sent his congratulation to President of Montenegro Filip Vujanovic. Later that month Ukraine's Deputy Premier for European and International Integration met his Montenegrin counterpart and expressed support for Montenegro's aspirations for European integration.

Since the start of the Russian invasion of Ukraine, the Montenegrin parliament passed a resolution in July 2022 condemning the invasion. Montenegrin Prime Minister Dritan Abazovic visited Ukrainian president Volodymyr Zelenskyy in Kyiv in June 2022, where Abazovic supported the initiative for Ukraine to obtain candidate status for EU membership. They then signed a joint declaration in December 2022 on the Euro-Atlantic perspective of Ukraine, pledging military and humanitarian support but also promising to receive Ukrainian refugees.

Montenegrin Prime Minister Milojko Spajić met Zelenskyy at the Berlin Ukraine Recovery Conference in June 2024. Spajić stated that the event was a "real opportunity to show our friends from Ukraine that they are not alone" and that he wanted to "reiterate that Montenegro stands fully with Ukraine".

== Agreements ==
In September 2006, the two countries agreed to cooperate in fighting money laundering. In March 2008, Ukraine said it was initiating an agreement on visa free travel with Montenegro. In October 2008, the foreign ministers of Ukraine and Montenegro initialed an agreement on friendship and cooperation between two countries. In June 2009 the two governments signed an agreement on mutual assistance in customs matters.

== Human trafficking ==
Montenegro has been identified as a transit point for human trafficking between Ukraine and the European Union. Vulnerable groups in Ukraine include women in prostitution, unaccompanied foreign minors, ethnic Romani and foreign construction workers. The "Balkan route" is a notorious path for sex-trade traffickers from Eastern European countries such as Ukraine. However, Montenegro has denied UN allegations on human trafficking.

== Resident diplomatic missions ==
- Montenegro has an embassy in Kyiv.
- Ukraine has an embassy in Podgorica.

== See also ==
- Foreign relations of Montenegro
- Foreign relations of Ukraine
- Ukraine-NATO relations
- Accession of Montenegro to the EU
- Accession of Ukraine to the EU
- Montenegro–Russia relations
- Soviet Union–Yugoslavia relations
