= List of diplomatic missions in Montenegro =

This article lists diplomatic missions resident in Montenegro and other cities in Montenegro. At present, the capital city of Podgorica hosts 27 embassies. Several other countries have ambassadors accredited to Montenegro, with most being resident in Belgrade.

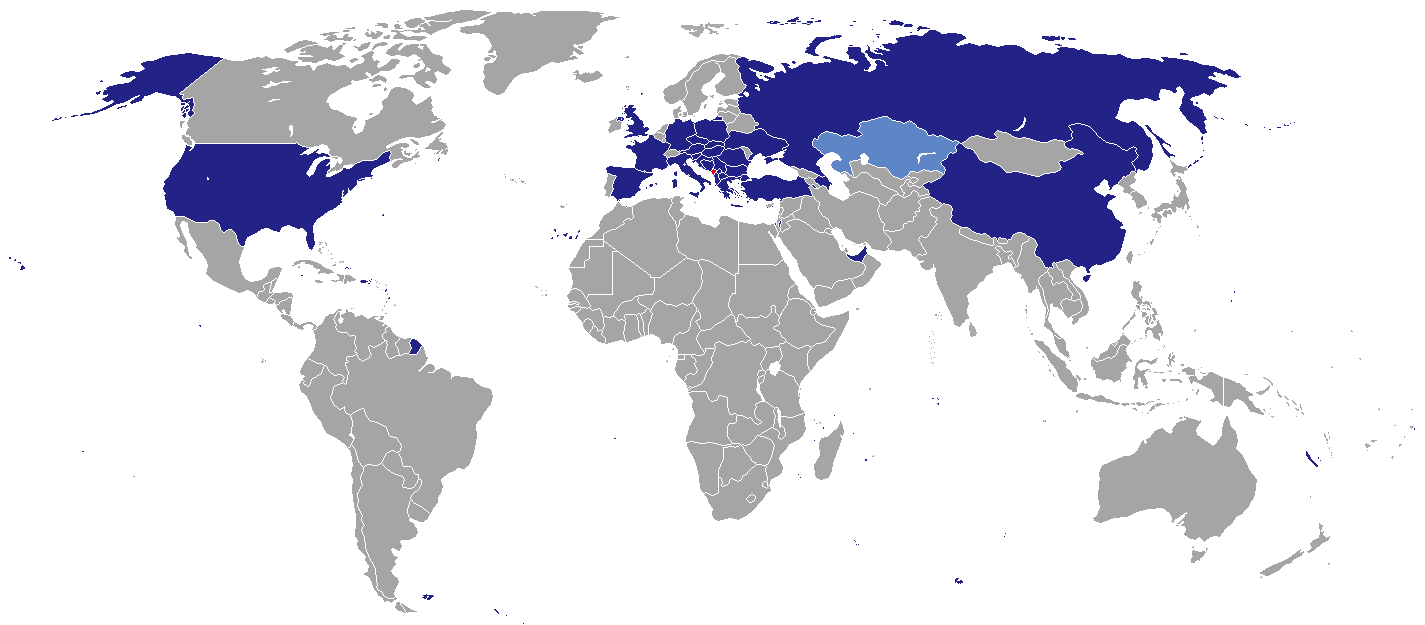
Diplomatic missions in Montenegro

== Diplomatic missions in Podgorica ==
=== Embassies ===
1. Albania
2. Austria
3. Bosnia and Herzegovina
4. Bulgaria
5. China
6. Croatia
7. Czech Republic
8. France
9. Germany
10. Greece
11. Hungary
12. Italy
13. Kosovo
14. North Macedonia
15. Palestine
16. Poland
17. Romania
18. Russia
19. Serbia
20. Slovakia
21. Slovenia
22. Sovereign Military Order of Malta
23. Turkey
24. Ukraine
25. United Arab Emirates
26. United Kingdom
27. United States

=== Other missions or delegations ===
1. Azerbaijan (Embassy office)
2. European Union (Delegation)
3. Spain (Embassy office)
4. United Nations (Resident coordinator's office)

== Consular missions ==
The following cities are host to career consular missions; all of which are consulates-general unless indicated otherwise.

=== Podgorica ===
1. Kazakhstan

=== Kotor ===
1. Croatia

=== Herceg Novi ===
1. Serbia

=== Ulcinj ===
1. Albania

== Non-resident embassies accredited to Montenegro ==
=== Resident in Athens Greece ===
1. Jordan
2. Panama
3. South Africa
4. Uruguay

=== Resident in Belgrade, Serbia ===
1. Algeria
2. Angola
3. Argentina
4. Australia
5. Azerbaijan
6. Belarus
7. Belgium
8. Brazil
9. Cambodia
10. Canada
11. Cuba
12. Cyprus
13. Denmark
14. Finland
15. Indonesia
16. Iran
17. Iraq
18. Ireland
19. Israel
20. Japan
21. Kuwait
22. Libya
23. Mexico
24. Morocco
25. Netherlands
26. Norway
27. Pakistan
28. Portugal
29. Qatar
30. South Korea
31. Spain
32. Sweden
33. Switzerland
34. Tunisia

=== Resident in Bucharest, Romania ===
1. Moldova
2. Sudan
3. Vietnam

=== Resident in Budapest, Hungary ===
1. Colombia
2. Estonia
3. Georgia
4. Laos
5. Latvia
6. Peru
7. Philippines
8. Thailand
9. Uzbekistan

=== Resident in Rome, Italy ===
1. Bangladesh
2. Ecuador
3. Ghana
4. Guinea
5. Ivory Coast
6. Mauritania
7. New Zealand

=== Resident in Vienna, Austria ===
1. Costa Rica
2. India
3. Mongolia
4. Namibia
5. Nepal

=== Resident in Zagreb, Croatia ===
1. Chile
2. Kazakhstan
3. Lithuania

=== Resident in other cities ===
1. Armenia (Prague)
2. Bahrain (Ankara)
3. Egypt (Prague)
4. Holy See (Sarajevo)
5. Iceland (Reykjavík)
6. Kyrgyzstan (Ankara)
7. Luxembourg (Luxembourg City)
8. Malta (Valletta)
9. Malaysia (Sarajevo)
10. North Korea (Sofia)
11. Oman (London)
12. San Marino (City of San Marino)
13. Saudi Arabia (Tirana)
14. Seychelles (Brussels)
15. Sri Lanka (Berlin)
16. Togo (Paris)

== Countries with No official relations with Montenegro ==
- Bhutan
- Cameroon
- Equatorial Guinea
- Madagascar
- Marshall Islands
- Nigeria
- Papua New Guinea
- São Tomé and Príncipe
- Somalia
- Tanzania
- Tonga

== See also ==
- Foreign relations of Montenegro
- List of diplomatic missions of Montenegro
- List of Ambassadors to Montenegro
