= List of ambassadors of Montenegro =

Ambassadors representing Montenegro abroad. Listed in alphabetical order by country.

== List of ambassadors ==
- Albania - Željko Perović
- Austria - Dragana Radulović
- Belgium - Vesko Garčević
- Bosnia and Herzegovina - Radovan Miljanić
- China - Ljiljana Tošković
- Croatia - -
- France - Irena Radović
- Germany - Vladimir Radulović

General Consul Abid Crnovršanin in Frankfurt

- Greece - Ivo Armenko
- Holy See - Antun Sbutega
- Hungary - Vanja Brailo
- Italy - Vojin Vlahović
- Kosovo - Ferhat Dinosha
- North Macedonia - Dušan Mrdović
- Poland - Ivan Leković
- Russia - Slobodan Backović
- Slovenia - Ranko Milović
- Serbia - Igor Jovović
- Switzerland - Ljubiša Perović
- Turkey - Ramo Bralić
- United Kingdom - Ljubiša Stanković
- Ukraine - Ljubomir Mišurović
- United States - Nebojša Kaluđerović

General Consul Branko Milić in New York City

- United Arab Emirates - Aleksandar Eraković

=== Non residential ===
- Belarus - Željko Radulović in Podgorica
- Canada - Nebojša Kaluđerović in Washington, D.C.
- Costa Rica- Milorad Šćepanović in New York City
- Cuba- Milorad Šćepanović in New York City
- Czech Republic- Dragana Radulović in Vienna
- Denmark- Nikola Ciko in Podgorica
- Iceland- Nebojša Kaluđerović in Washington, D.C.
- Moldova - Željko Radulović in Podgorica
- Malta - Vojin Vlahović in Rome
- Monaco - Irena Radović in Paris
- Saint Vincent and the Grenadines- Milorad Šćepanović in New York City
- San Marino - Vojin Vlahović in Rome
- Slovakia- Dragana Radulović in Vienna
- Sovereign Military Order of Malta - Antun Sbutega

== List of Ambassadors to international organizations ==
- - Dragana Radulović, Organization for Security and Co-operation in Europe and other organizations in Vienna
- - Ana Vukadinović, Council of Europe in Strasbourg
- (Europe) - Aleksandar Pejović, European Union in Brussels
- - Vesko Garčević, NATO in Brussels
- (United Nations) - Milorad Šćepanović, UN in New York City
- (United Nations) - Ljubiša Stanković, UN in Geneva
- - Irena Radović, UNESCO in Paris

== See also ==
- Montenegrin diplomatic missions
- Foreign relations of Montenegro
