= Foreign relations of Montenegro =

In a referendum on 21 May 2006, the people of Montenegro opted to leave the State Union of Serbia and Montenegro. This result was confirmed with a declaration of independence by the Montenegrin parliament on 3 June 2006. It simultaneously requested international recognition and outlined foreign policy goals. Montenegro's primary foreign policy objectives were initially to join the United Nations (2006) and the military alliance NATO (2017). It has since been focused on multilateral trade as well as its efforts to join the European Union.

Montenegro is the most advanced Western Balkan EU candidate. As of the European Commission’s 2026 Enlargement Package it had provisionally closed 21 of 33 negotiating chapters. The Commission indicated that the remaining chapters could be closed by the end of 2026, with work already under way on an accession treaty that could be signed in June 2027, opening the possibility of membership in 2028. Montenegro maintains full alignment with the EU’s Common Foreign and Security Policy.

Russia gave official recognition on 11 June 2006, and was the first permanent member of the United Nations Security Council to do so. The European Council of Ministers recognized Montenegrin independence on 12 June, as did the United States. The United Kingdom extended recognition on 13 June. The last two permanent members of the United Nations Security Council, France and the People's Republic of China recognised the government of Montenegro on 14 June.

== Membership in international organizations ==
Organization	Application date	Admission date
NATO Full Membership	4 Dec 2009	5 June 2017
NATO's Partnership for Peace	30 August 2006	14 December 2006
International Criminal Court (ICC)		23 October 2006
Council of Europe (CoE)	6 June 2006	11 May 2007
Southeast European Cooperation Process (SECP)		11 May 2007
Black Sea Economic Co-operation (BSEC)		Admission rejected by Greece because of the Cyprus dispute
Euro-Atlantic Partnership Council (EAPC)		✓
United Nations Educational, Scientific and Cultural Organization (UNESCO)		1 March 2007
World Trade Organization (WTO)	10 December 2004	29 April 2012
United Nations (UN)	5 June 2006	28 June 2006
World Health Organization (WHO)	29 August 2006	14 September 2006
International Telecommunication Union (ITU)		21 June 2006
Energy Community		1 January 2007
Organization for Security and Co-operation in Europe (OSCE)	5 June 2006	22 June 2006
International Labour Organization (ILO)		18 July 2006
Universal Postal Union (UPU)		26 July 2006
Central European Initiative (CEI)		2 August 2006
Stability Pact for Southeastern Europe	3 August 2006	✓
International Atomic Energy Agency (IAEA)aea.org4 June 2006	30 October 2006	
International Criminal Police Organization (Interpol)	27 July 2006	22 September 2006
International Maritime Organization (IMO)		10 October 2006
Inter-Parliamentary Union (IPU)		16 October 2006
Organisation for the Prohibition of Chemical Weapons (OPCW)		23 October 2006
World Customs Organization (WCO)		24 October 2006
European Bank for Reconstruction and Development (EBRD)		25 October 2006
International Trade Union Confederation (ITUC)		
United Nations Industrial Development Organization (UNIDO)		22 November 2006
International Organization for Migration (IOM)		28 November 2006
World Intellectual Property Organization (WIPO)		4 December 2006
International Monetary Fund (IMF)	18 July 2006	18 January 2007
World Bank Group (IBRD, IDA, IFC, MIGA)	3 August 2006	18 January 2007
United Nations Conference on Trade and Development (UNCTAD)		
World Meteorological Organization (WMO)		25 May 2007
World Tourism Organization (UNWTO)		30 November 2007
International Federation of Red Cross and Red Crescent Societies (IFRCS)		21 September 2006
International Fund for Agricultural Development (IFAD)		16 February 2015
International Hydrographic Organization (IHO)		
International Organization for Standardization (ISO)		
Permanent Court of Arbitration (PCA)		3 June 2006
Southeast European Cooperative Initiative (SECI)		June 2008
European Civil Aviation Conference		June 2008
Eurocontrol		1 July 2007
Food and Agriculture Organization (FAO)		17 November 2007
European Network of Transmission System Operators for Electricity (ENTSO-E)		
Intergovernmental Organisation for International Carriage by Rail (OTIF)		1 July 2010
Council of Bureaux (CoBx)		2012
Union for the Mediterranean		13 July 2008
Full European Union Membership	15 December 2008; candidate status and accession negotiations ongoing; 21 chapters provisionally closed as of November 2026	
International Sports Organizations
International Association of Athletics Federations (IAAF)		27 July 2006
International Handball Federation (IHF)		7 August 2006
International Swimming Federation (FINA)		21 August 2006
International Tennis Federation (ITF)		24 August 2006
International Basketball Federation (FIBA)		27 August 2006
International Volleyball Federation (FIVB)		23 October 2006
Union of European Football Associations (UEFA)	30 June 2006	26 January 2007
World Taekwondo Federation (WTF)		17 May 2007
International Football Federation (FIFA)	30 June 2006	31 May 2007
International Archery Federation (FITA)		5 July 2007
International Olympic Committee (IOC)		6 July 2007
International Bowling Federation (FIQ)		30 August 2007
International Table Tennis Federation (ITTF)		

- On June 28, 2006, Montenegro was added to the American Radio Relay League's DXCC List as the 336th entry based on membership in the UN.

== Diplomatic relations ==
List of countries which Montenegro maintains diplomatic relations with:

#	Country	Date
1	Estonia	13 June 2006
2	United Kingdom	13 June 2006
3	France	13 June 2006
4	Germany	14 June 2006
5	Hungary	14 June 2006
6	Italy	14 June 2006
7	North Macedonia	14 June 2006
8	Czech Republic	15 June 2006
9	Denmark	15 June 2006
10	Latvia	19 June 2006
11	Ireland	20 June 2006
12	Norway	21 June 2006
13	Slovenia	21 June 2006
14	Serbia	22 June 2006
15	Russia	26 June 2006
16	Sweden	26 June 2006
17	Guinea-Bissau	29 June 2006
18	Singapore	30 June 2006
19	Turkey	3 July 2006
20	Switzerland	5 July 2006
21	China	6 July 2006
22	Croatia	7 July 2006
23	Austria	12 July 2006
24	Finland	12 July 2006
25	Israel	12 July 2006
26	New Zealand	17 July 2006
27	Lithuania	18 July 2006
28	Malta	19 July 2006
29	Chile	24 July 2006
30	Japan	24 July 2006
31	Belgium	25 July 2006
32	Slovakia	25 July 2006
33	Andorra	28 July 2006
34	Iran	28 July 2006
35	Albania	1 August 2006
—	State of Palestine	1 August 2006
36	Bulgaria	2 August 2006
37	India	2 August 2006
38	Vietnam	4 August 2006
39	United States	7 August 2006
40	Belarus	8 August 2006
41	Romania	9 August 2006
42	Poland	14 August 2006
43	Malaysia	17 August 2006
44	Ukraine	22 August 2006
45	Tajikistan	23 August 2006
46	Australia	1 September 2006
47	South Korea	4 September 2006
48	Canada	5 September 2006
—	Sovereign Military Order of Malta	5 September 2006
49	Netherlands	8 September 2006
50	Peru	12 September 2006
51	Argentina	13 September 2006
52	Bosnia and Herzegovina	14 September 2006
53	Luxembourg	21 September 2006
54	Iceland	26 September 2006
55	Egypt	27 September 2006
56	Guatemala	27 September 2006
57	South Africa	11 October 2006
58	Brazil	20 October 2006
59	Cuba	20 October 2006
60	Pakistan	23 October 2006
61	Sudan	31 October 2006
62	Armenia	7 November 2006
63	Qatar	16 November 2006
64	Guinea	17 November 2006
65	Myanmar	27 November 2006
66	Mongolia	30 November 2006
67	Spain	12 December 2006
—	Holy See	16 December 2006
68	Greece	18 December 2006
69	Uzbekistan	19 December 2006
70	Kazakhstan	16 January 2007
71	Bangladesh	2 March 2007
72	Tunisia	7 March 2007
73	Moldova	9 March 2007
74	Cyprus	12 March 2007
75	Liechtenstein	26 March 2007
76	San Marino	29 March 2007
77	Oman	11 April 2007
78	Portugal	17 May 2007
79	Costa Rica	24 May 2007
80	Mexico	5 June 2007
81	Paraguay	5 June 2007
82	Thailand	6 June 2007
83	North Korea	16 July 2007
84	Algeria	24 September 2007
85	Monaco	17 October 2007
86	Georgia	29 October 2007
87	Eritrea	18 March 2008
88	United Arab Emirates	4 April 2008
89	Azerbaijan	24 April 2008
90	Panama	9 May 2008
91	Syria	30 October 2008
92	Turkmenistan	26 November 2008
93	Lebanon	4 December 2008
94	Uruguay	25 February 2009
95	Dominican Republic	10 March 2009
96	Kyrgyzstan	24 June 2009
97	Morocco	8 September 2009
98	Bahrain	25 September 2009
99	Ecuador	26 September 2009
100	Nicaragua	26 September 2009
101	Philippines	26 September 2009
102	Cambodia	12 October 2009
103	Namibia	16 November 2009
104	Maldives	26 November 2009
105	Angola	21 December 2009
106	Mauritania	21 December 2009
—	Kosovo	15 January 2010
107	Brunei	19 January 2010
108	Laos	4 February 2010
109	Suriname	14 May 2010
110	Seychelles	19 May 2010
111	Jordan	19 May 2010
112	Mozambique	27 May 2010
113	Fiji	15 June 2010
114	Zambia	29 June 2010
115	Honduras	8 July 2010
116	Botswana	16 July 2010
117	Kuwait	27 July 2010
118	Afghanistan	21 September 2010
119	Democratic Republic of the Congo	22 September 2010
120	Senegal	22 September 2010
121	Timor-Leste	24 September 2010
122	Saint Lucia	25 September 2010
123	Bolivia	18 October 2010
124	Saint Vincent and the Grenadines	8 November 2010
125	Jamaica	12 November 2010
126	Zimbabwe	22 November 2010
127	Cape Verde	17 December 2010
128	Solomon Islands	23 December 2010
129	Iraq	29 December 2010
130	Nauru	25 January 2011
131	Samoa	31 January 2011
132	Republic of the Congo	1 February 2011
133	Comoros	9 February 2011
134	Libya	9 February 2011
135	Dominica	25 February 2011
136	Sri Lanka	4 April 2011
137	Antigua and Barbuda	11 April 2011
138	Trinidad and Tobago	15 April 2011
139	Tuvalu	4 May 2011
140	Ethiopia	10 June 2011
141	Uganda	14 July 2011
142	Nepal	18 July 2011
143	Colombia	12 August 2011
144	Benin	15 September 2011
145	Malawi	16 September 2011
146	Saudi Arabia	16 September 2011
147	Guyana	19 September 2011
148	Indonesia	21 September 2011
149	Djibouti	6 October 2011
150	Kenya	6 October 2011
151	South Sudan	21 November 2011
152	Burkina Faso	20 December 2011
153	Mali	10 April 2012
154	Gambia	16 August 2012
155	Burundi	17 August 2012
156	Ghana	20 September 2012
157	Mauritius	26 September 2012
158	Haiti	17 October 2012
159	Saint Kitts and Nevis	19 October 2012
160	Gabon	12 November 2012
161	Togo	21 December 2012
162	Eswatini	28 February 2013
163	Rwanda	12 April 2013
164	Federated States of Micronesia	10 September 2013
165	Lesotho	23 September 2013
166	Palau	25 September 2013
167	Vanuatu	26 September 2013
168	El Salvador	27 September 2013
169	Yemen	28 September 2013
170	Kiribati	17 January 2014
171	Grenada	17 March 2014
172	Liberia	7 April 2014
173	Venezuela	4 September 2014
174	Niger	15 September 2014
175	Sierra Leone	8 October 2014
176	Ivory Coast	29 October 2014
177	Chad	20 March 2015
178	Central African Republic	2 April 2015
179	Bahamas	6 September 2017
180	Belize	6 September 2017
181	Barbados	19 February 2020
182	Papua New Guinea	26 September 2026

== Bilateral relations ==
=== Canada relations ===
Canadian Foreign Minister Peter MacKay wrote to Foreign Minister Miodrag Vlahović extending diplomatic recognition and agreeing to hold discussions on the establishment of diplomatic relations, which occurred later in 2007.

The Canadian Embassy in Belgrade is accredited to Montenegro.

=== China relations ===
The establishment of diplomatic relations between the People's Republic of China and the Republic of Montenegro was confirmed on 14 June 2006.

China transformed its consulate into an embassy in Podgorica on July 7, 2006. The Montenegrin embassy in China opened in Beijing on November 13, 2007.

In 2015, total trade between the two countries amounted to 160,385,964 euros.

=== Russia relations ===
Initially strong from 2006, relations slipped from 2010 as Montenegro has looked westward, with Montenegro joining international sanctions in 2014 following the Annexation of Crimea by the Russian Federation. The failed Russian military coup in October 2016 aiming to stop Montenegro seeking NATO membership was a turning point. Despite Russian investment into Montenegro, joining the EU became a key goal of Montenegro.

Russia continues to spy on Montenegro, GRU officer Igor Zaytsev is known to have travelled to Montenegro on numerous occasions up to 2018, bring in encryption equipment to give to existing or potential agents, including allegedly former Foreign Ministry spokesperson Radomir Sekulović.

Russia's invasion of Ukraine in 2022 drove relationships down further, with five diplomats expelled in March/April 2022 then six more Russian diplomats being expelled from Montenegro for alleged spying, in September, with Russia then closing its consulate in Podgorica.

In August 2023 Montenegro refused to extradite Dmitry Senin, a former Russian FSB Colonel who had fled Russia in 2017 and had been granted asylum.

=== United Kingdom relations ===
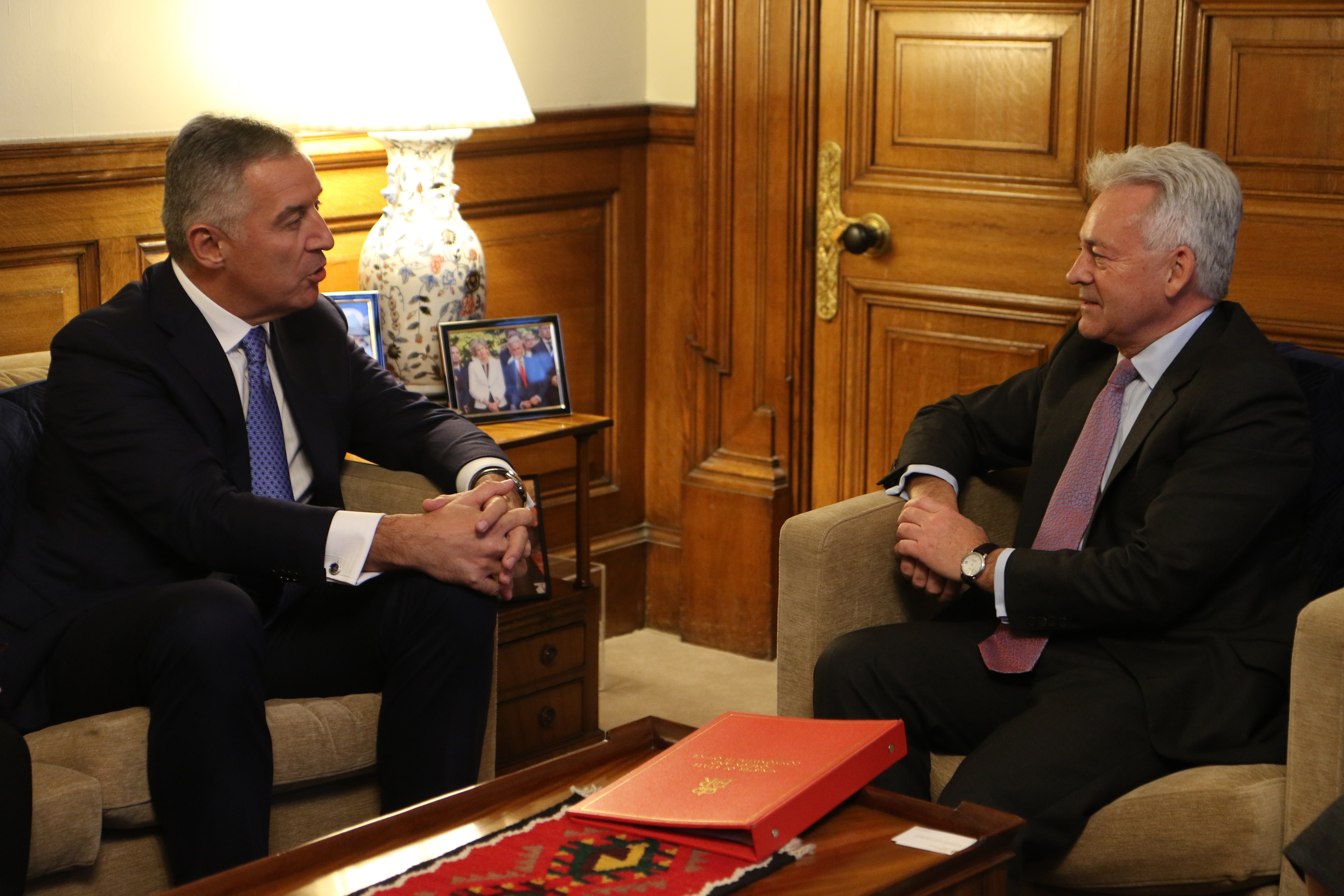
Foreign Office Minister Sir Alan Duncan with Montenegrin President Milo Đukanović in London, November 2018.

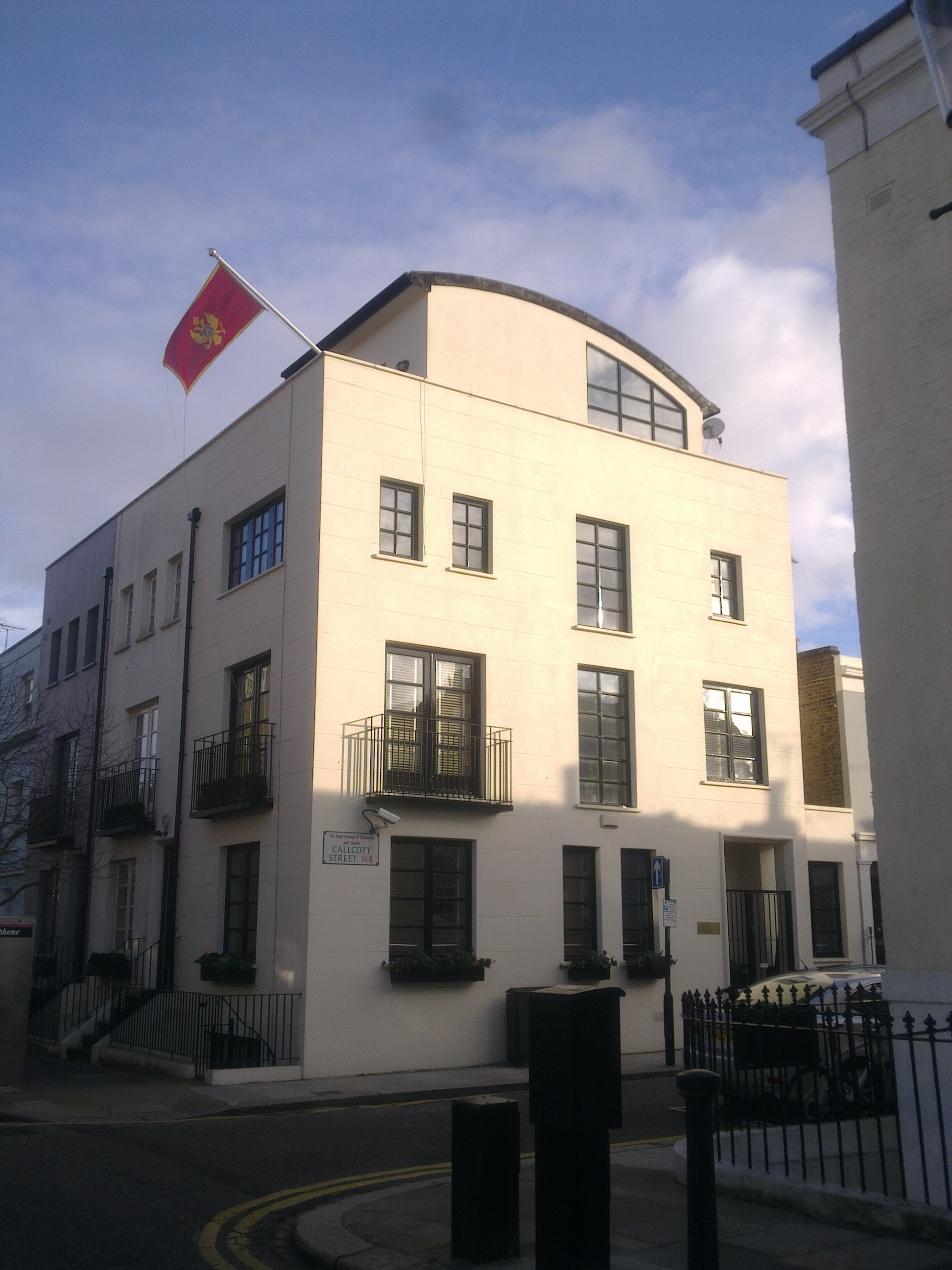
Embassy of Montenegro in London

Montenegro established diplomatic relations with the United Kingdom on 13 June 2006.

- Montenegro maintains an embassy in London.
- The United Kingdom is accredited to Montenegro through its embassy in Podgorica.

Both countries share common membership of the Council of Europe, European Court of Human Rights, the International Criminal Court, NATO, OSCE, the United Nations, and the World Trade Organization. Bilaterally the two countries have a Double Taxation Convention, and a Reciprocal Healthcare Agreement.

=== United States relations ===
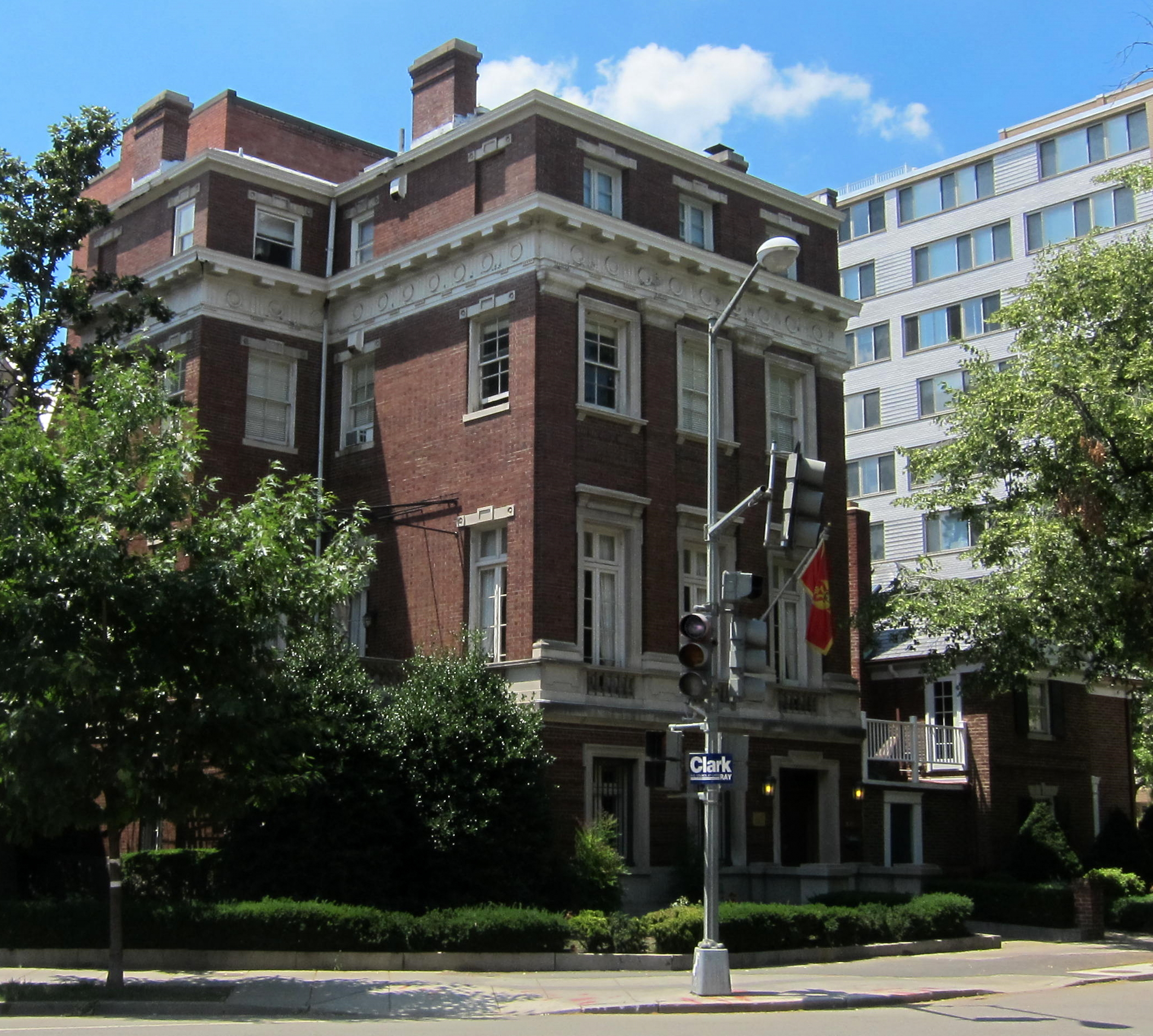
Embassy of Montenegro in the Dupont Circle neighborhood of Washington, D.C.

The United States recognized the Republic of Montenegro on June 12, 2006, being among the first states to do so. Diplomatic relations between the two countries were established on August 15, and have since rapidly developed. On August 28, six U.S. Senators, John McCain (R-AZ), Saxby Chambliss (R-GA), Mel Martinez (R-FL), Lindsey Graham (R-SC), Richard Burr (R-NC) and John E. Sununu (R-NH), made an official visit to Montenegro. Their activities included a meeting with President Vujanović and with the speaker of the Montenegrin parliament.

Soon after the congressional visit, Defense Secretary Donald Rumsfeld paid an official visit to Montenegro, seeking support for the war on terror and overall American geopolitical goals in Europe. Following the Secretary's meeting with Montenegrin Prime Minister Milo Đukanović, it was announced that Montenegro had agreed in principle to aid the US efforts in Iraq and Afghanistan, although no specific pledges of aid were made.

== See also ==
- Accession of Montenegro to the European Union
- Foreign relations of Serbia and Montenegro
- List of Ambassadors from Montenegro
- List of Ambassadors to Montenegro
- List of diplomatic missions in Montenegro
- List of diplomatic missions of Montenegro
- Montenegro in intergovernmental organizations
- Montenegro–NATO relations
- Foreign relations of Yugoslavia
