= Montenegro in intergovernmental organizations =

Montenegro is a member state of several international organizations (intergovernmental organizations):

== International organizations ==
- United Nations (UN)
- International Criminal Police Organization (Interpol), security
- International Criminal Court (ICC), international tribunal
- World Customs Organization (WCO), trade
- North Atlantic Treaty Organization (NATO)
- European Border and Coast Guard Agency (FRONTEX)
- Council of Europe (CoE)
- Organization for Security and Co-operation in Europe (OSCE)
- Central European Free Trade Agreement (CEFTA), trade agreement between non-EU countries
- Berlin Process, EU enlargement diplomatic initiative
- Union for the Mediterranean (UfM), intergovernmental
- Central European Initiative (CEI), forum of regional cooperation
- Regional Cooperation Council (RCC), forum of regional cooperation
- South-East European Cooperation Process (SEECP), forum of regional cooperation
- Southeast European Cooperative Initiative (SECI), security

=== Future ===
- European Union (EU), candidate, in negotiating process
