= List of diplomatic missions of Montenegro =

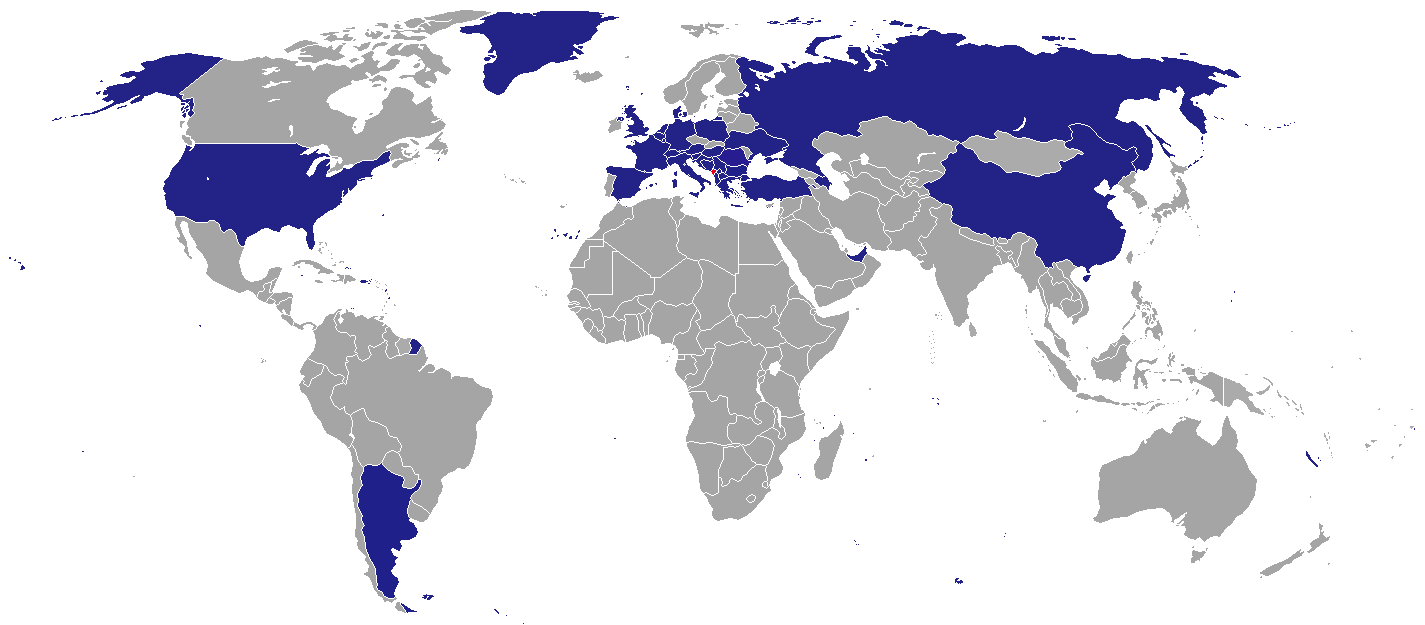
Map of Montenegrin diplomatic missions

This is a list of diplomatic missions of Montenegro, excluding honorary consulates. Montenegro is building its diplomatic network.

On November 30, 2006, the Government adopted the Memorandum of Agreement between Montenegro and the Republic of Serbia on Consular Protection and Services to the Citizens of Montenegro. By this agreement, Serbia, through its network of diplomatic and consular, provides consular services to the Montenegrin citizens on the territory of states in which Montenegro has no missions of its own.

== Americas ==
- Argentina
  - Buenos Aires (Embassy)
- United States
  - Washington, D.C. (Embassy)
  - New York City (Consulate-General)
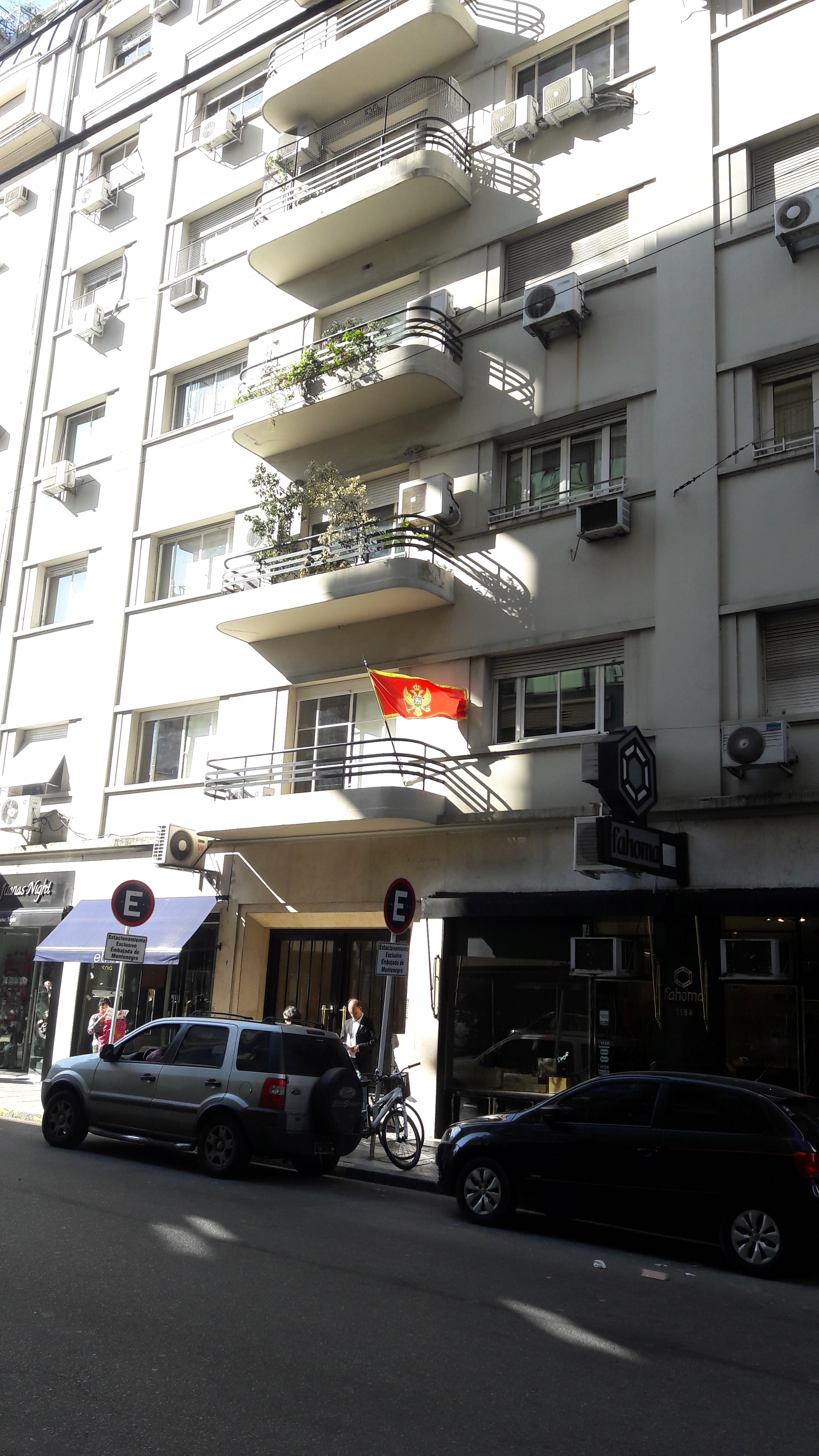
Embassy in Buenos Aires

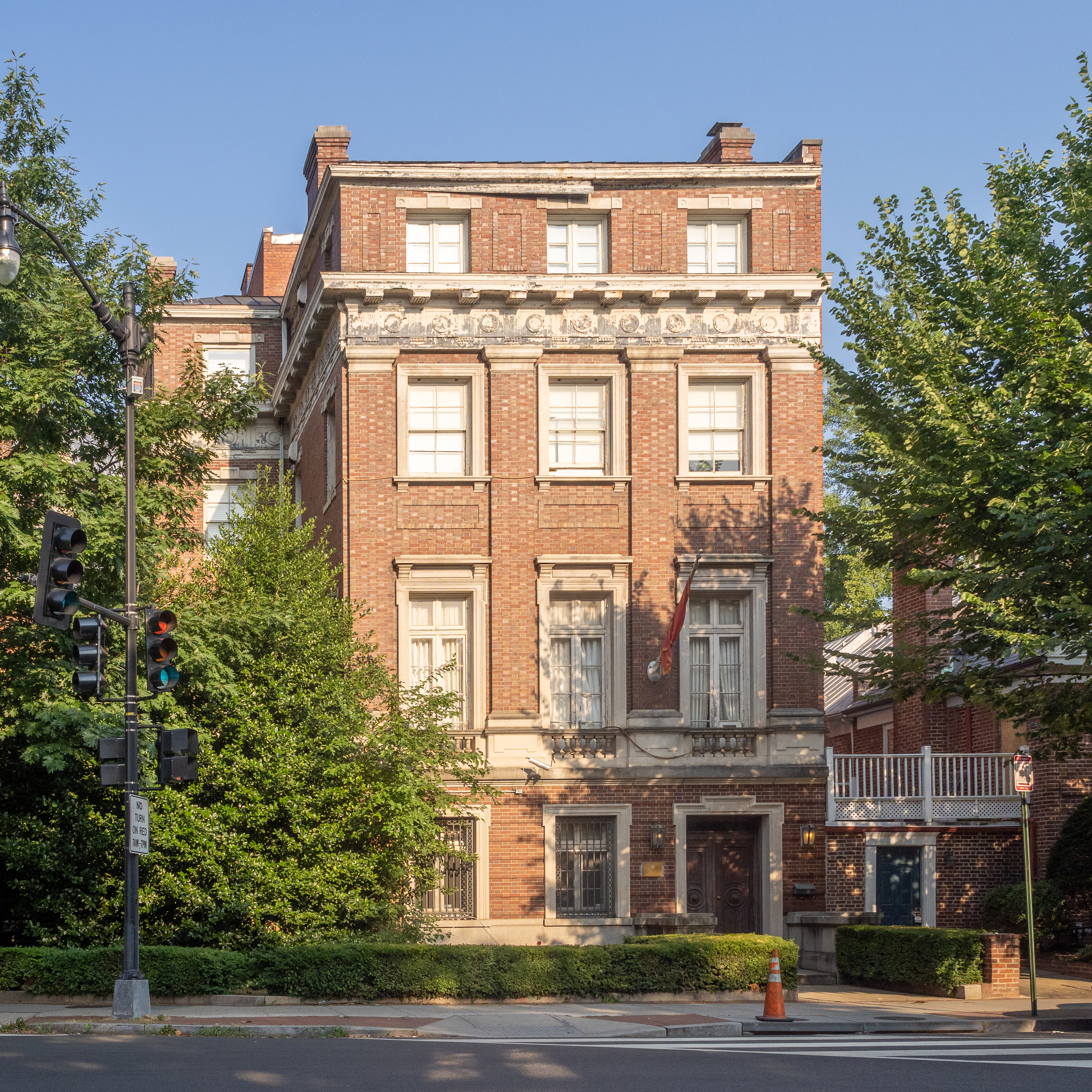
Embassy in Washington, D.C.

== Asia ==
- Azerbaijan
  - Baku (Embassy Office)
- China
  - Beijing (Embassy) (Note: Also accredited to the Association of South East Asian Nations.)
- Turkey
  - Ankara (Embassy)
  - Istanbul (Consulate-General)
- United Arab Emirates
  - Abu Dhabi (Embassy)

== Europe ==
- Albania
  - Tirana (Embassy)
- Austria
  - Vienna (Embassy)
- Belgium
  - Brussels (Embassy)
- Bosnia and Herzegovina
  - Sarajevo (Embassy)
- Bulgaria
  - Sofia (Embassy)
- Croatia
  - Zagreb (Embassy)
- Denmark
  - Copenhagen (Embassy)
- France
  - Paris (Embassy) (Note: Also accredited to Monaco.)
- Germany
  - Berlin (Embassy)
  - Frankfurt (Consulate-General)
- Greece
  - Athens (Embassy)
- Holy See
  - Rome (Embassy) (Note: The Montenegrin Embassy to the Holy See is located outside Vatican territory in Rome.)
- Hungary
  - Budapest (Embassy)
- Italy
  - Rome (Embassy) (Note: Also accredited to Malta and San Marino.)
- Kosovo
  - Pristina (Embassy)
- Luxembourg
  - Luxembourg City (Embassy office)
- Netherlands
  - The Hague (Embassy)
- North Macedonia
  - Skopje (Embassy)
- Poland
  - Warsaw (Embassy)
- Romania
  - Bucharest (Embassy)
- Russia
  - Moscow (Embassy)
- Serbia
  - Belgrade (Embassy)
  - Sremski Karlovci (Consulate-General)
- Slovenia
  - Ljubljana (Embassy)
- Spain
  - Madrid (Embassy) (Note: Also accredited to Andorra.)
- Switzerland
  - Bern (Embassy)
- Ukraine
  - Kyiv (Embassy)
- United Kingdom
  - London (Embassy)
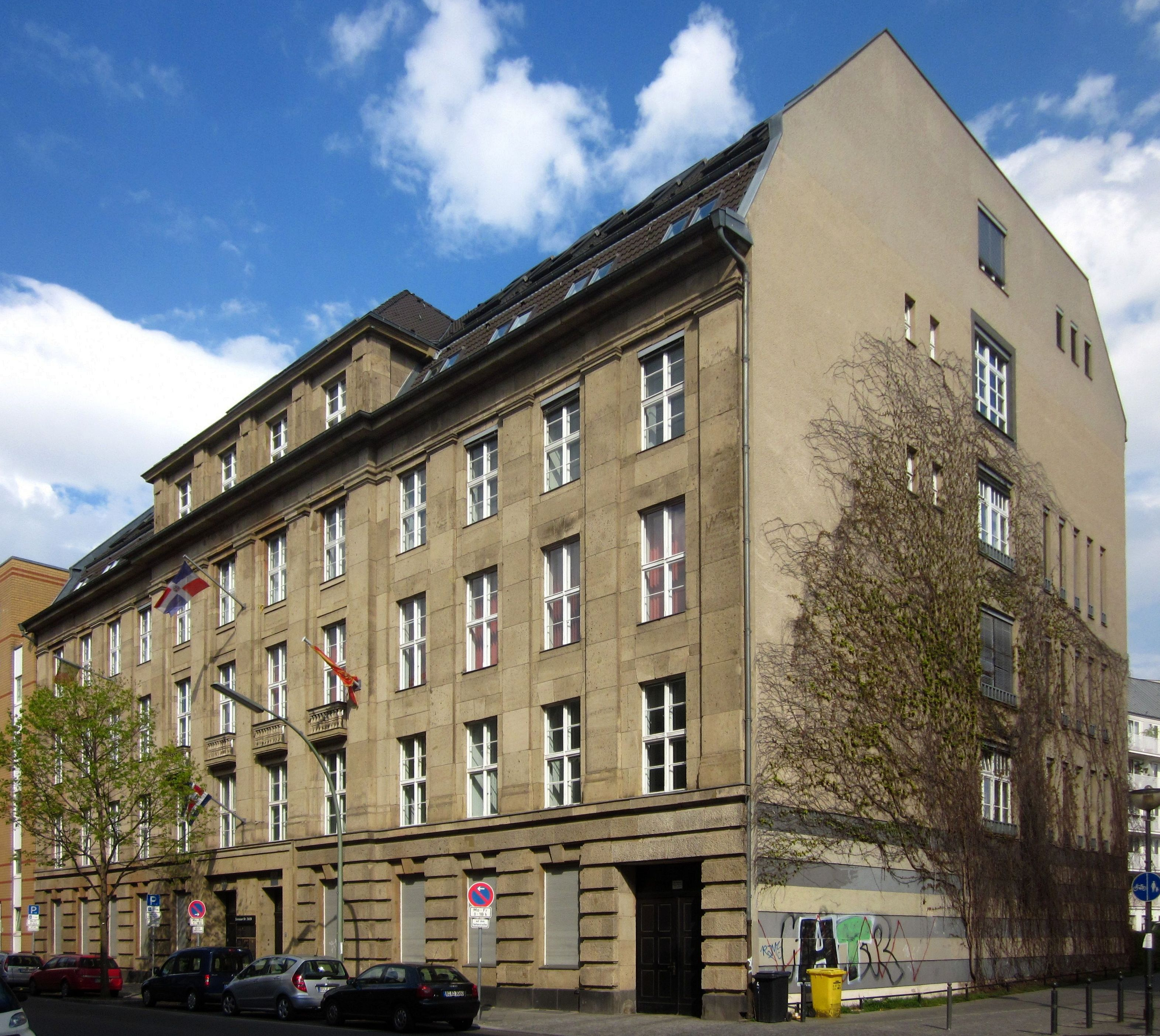
Embassy in Berlin

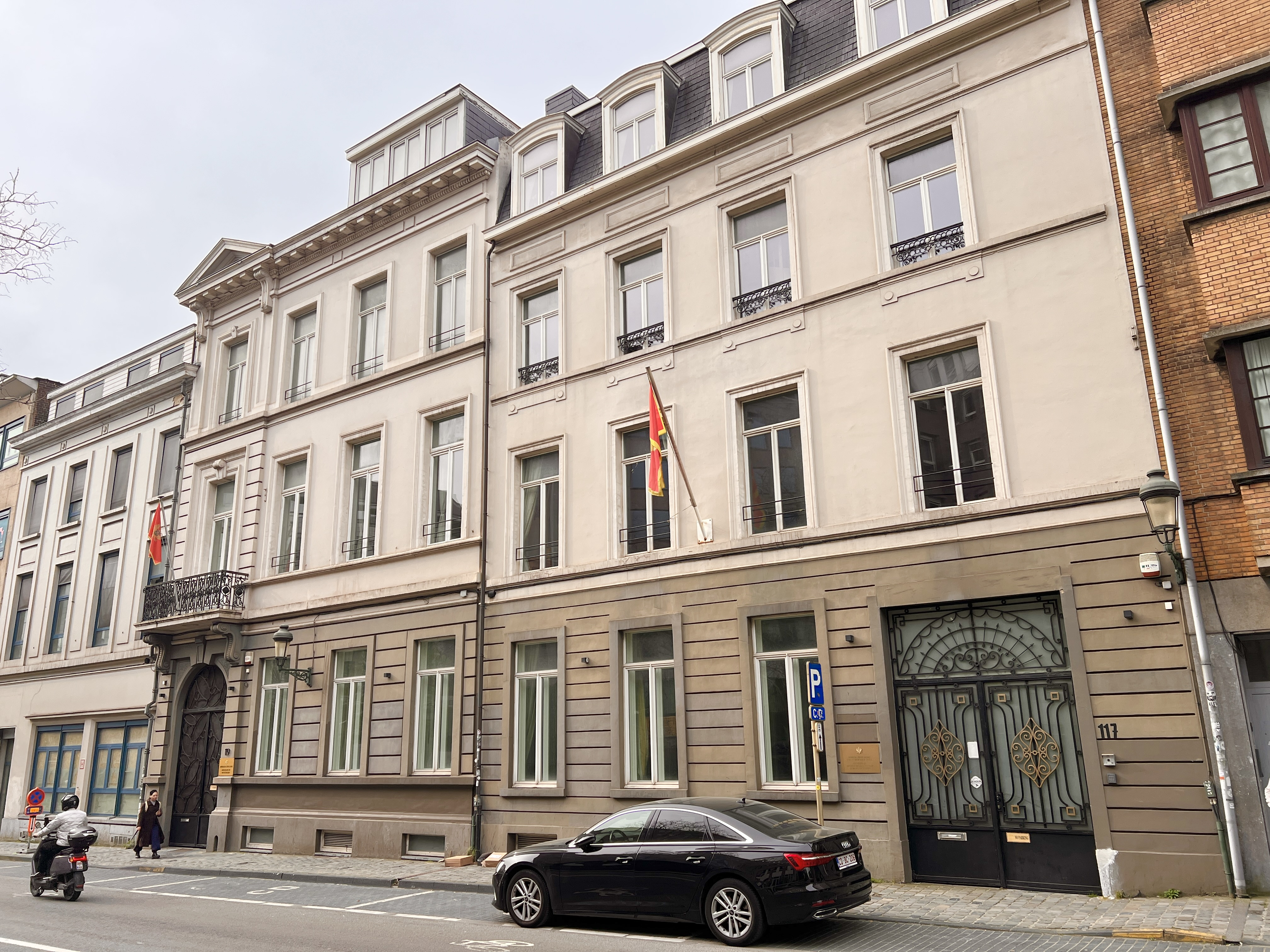
Embassy in Brussels

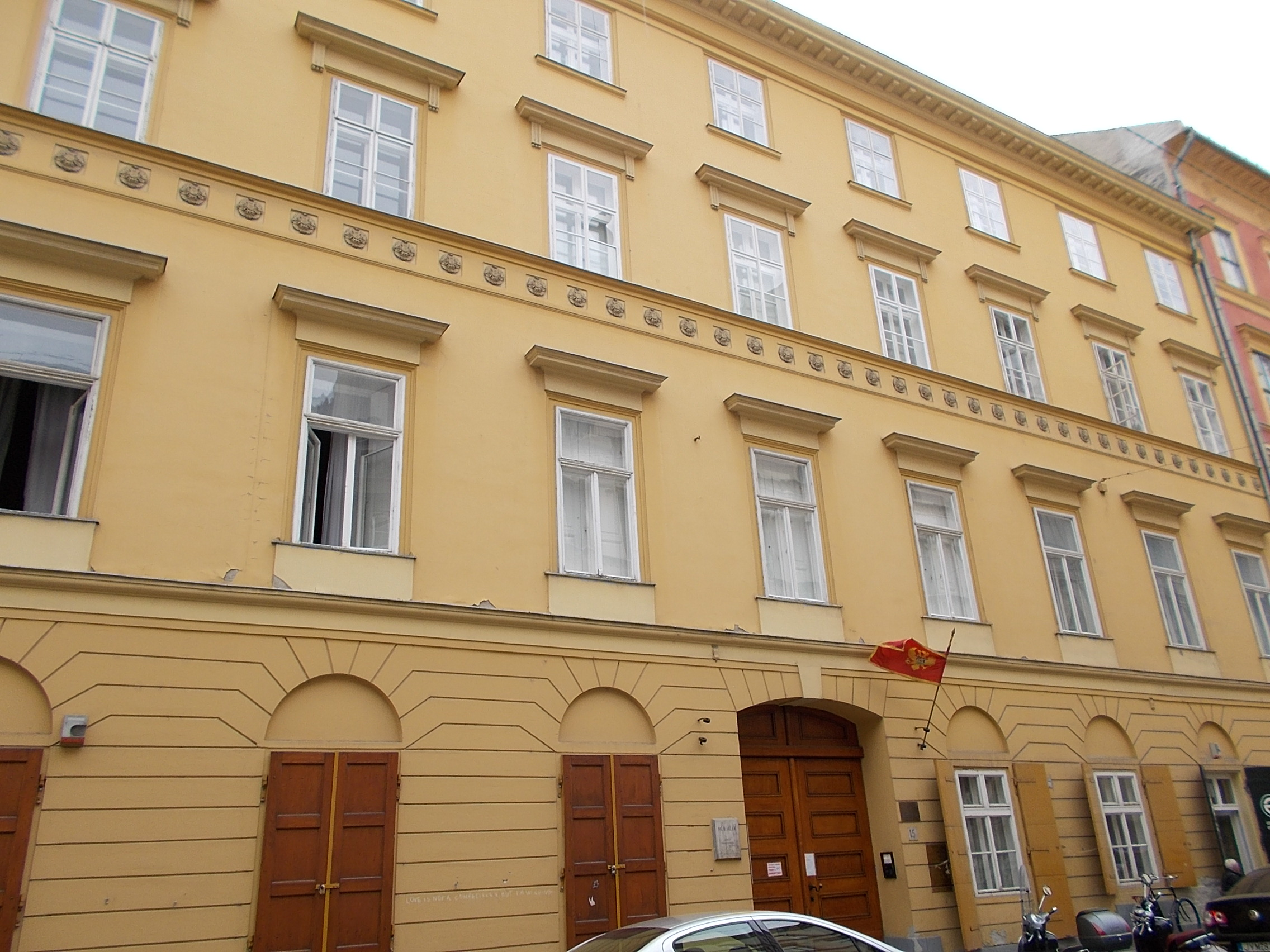
Embassy in Budapest

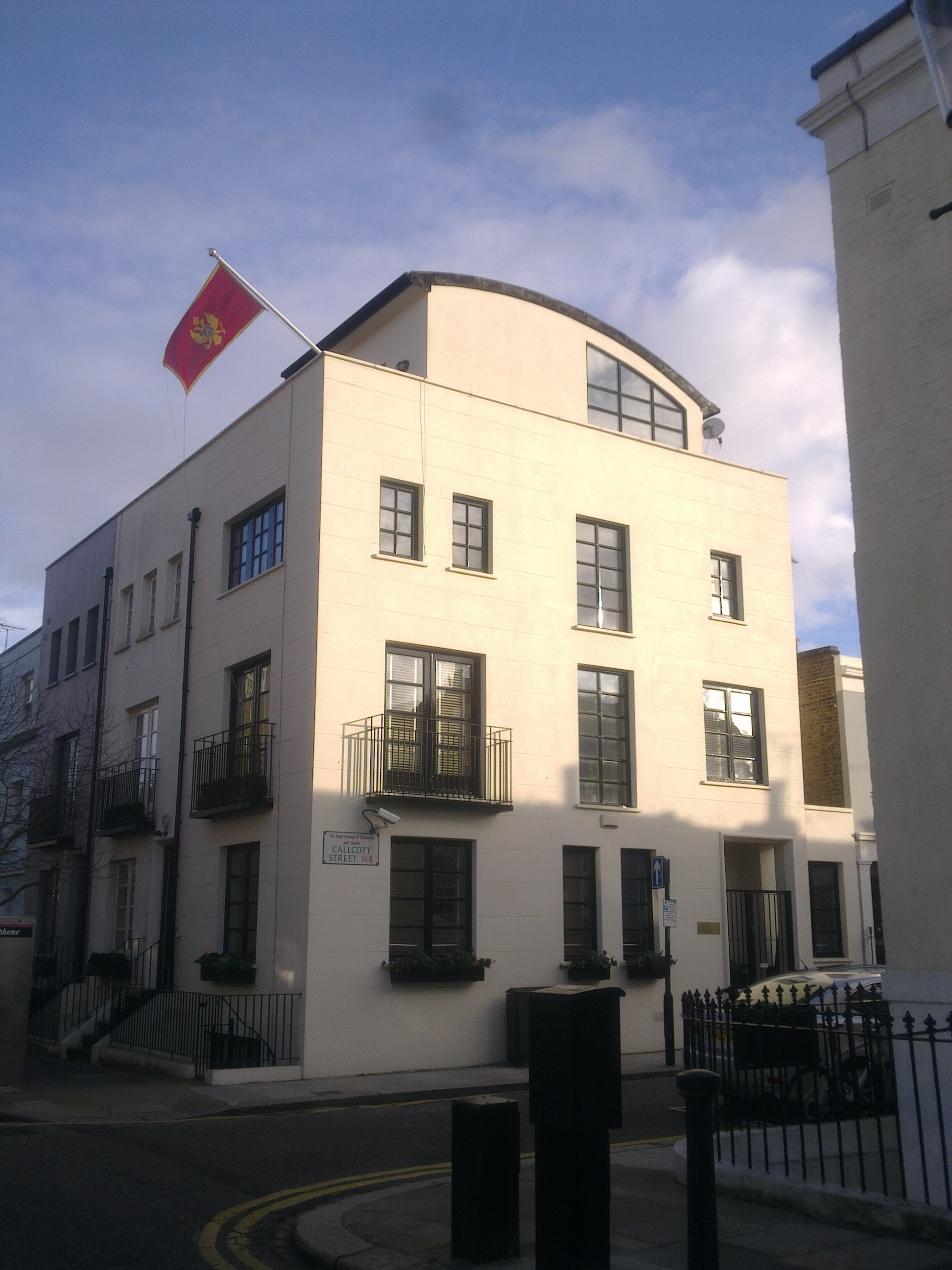
Embassy in London

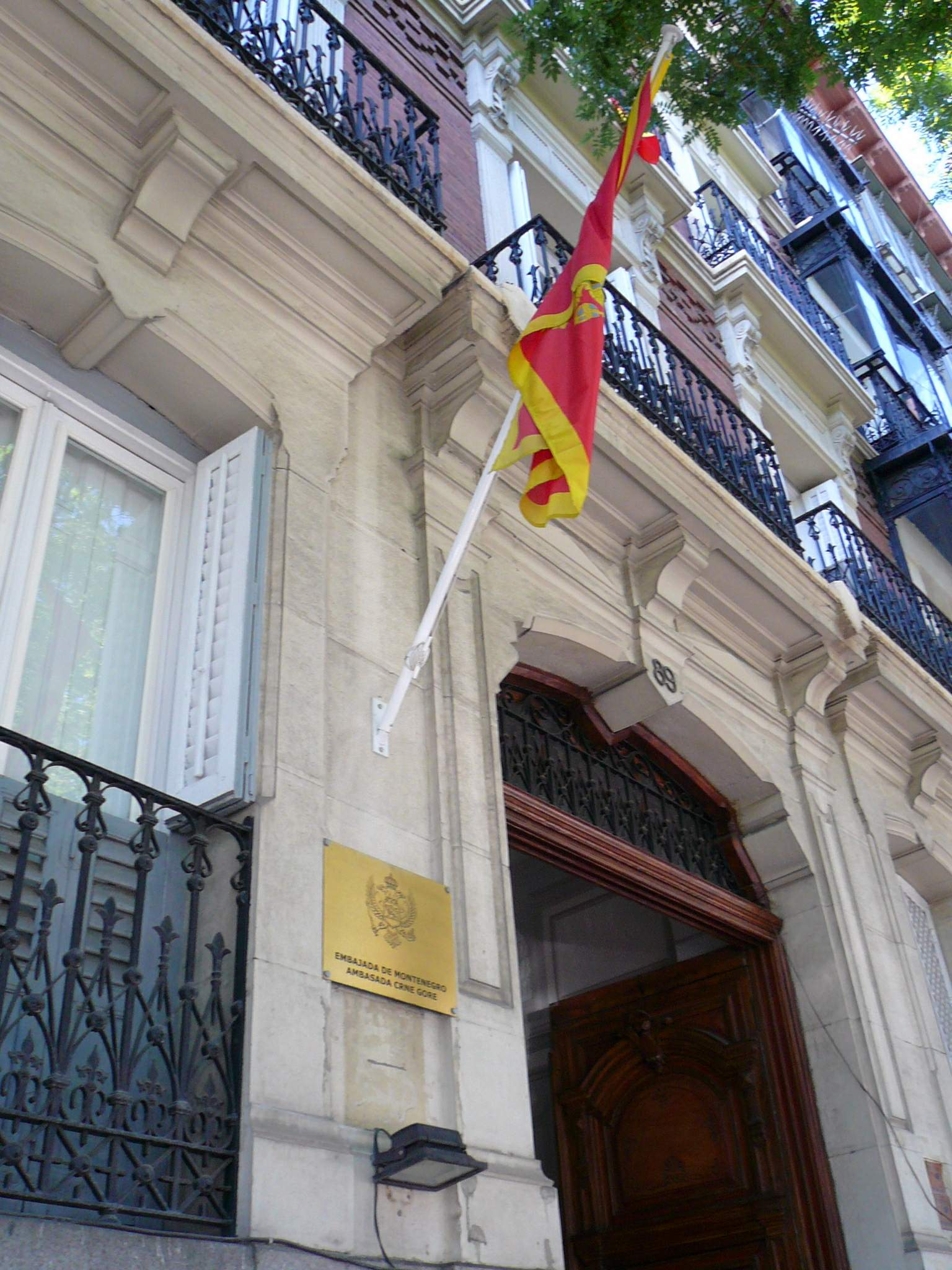
Embassy in Madrid

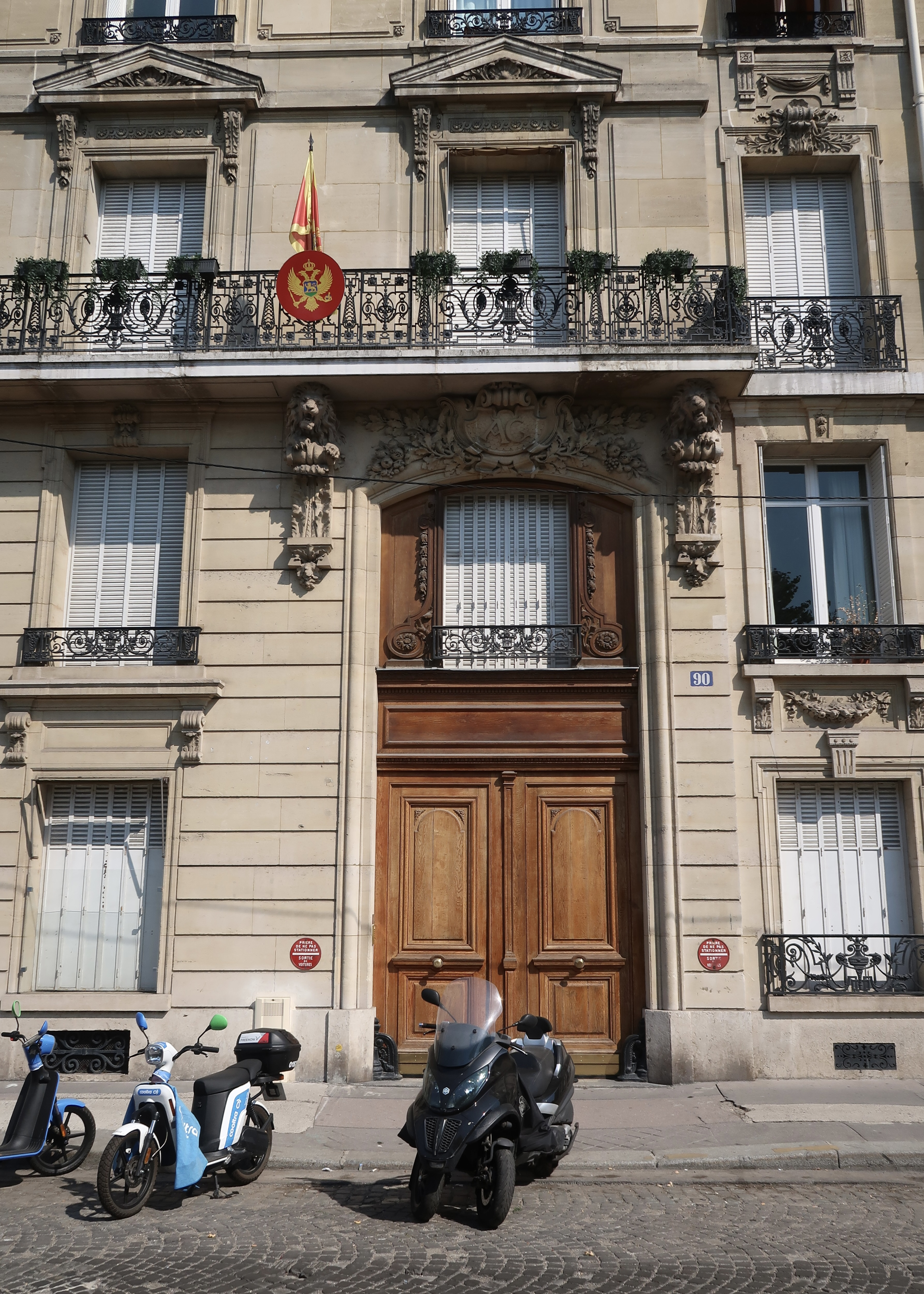
Embassy in Paris

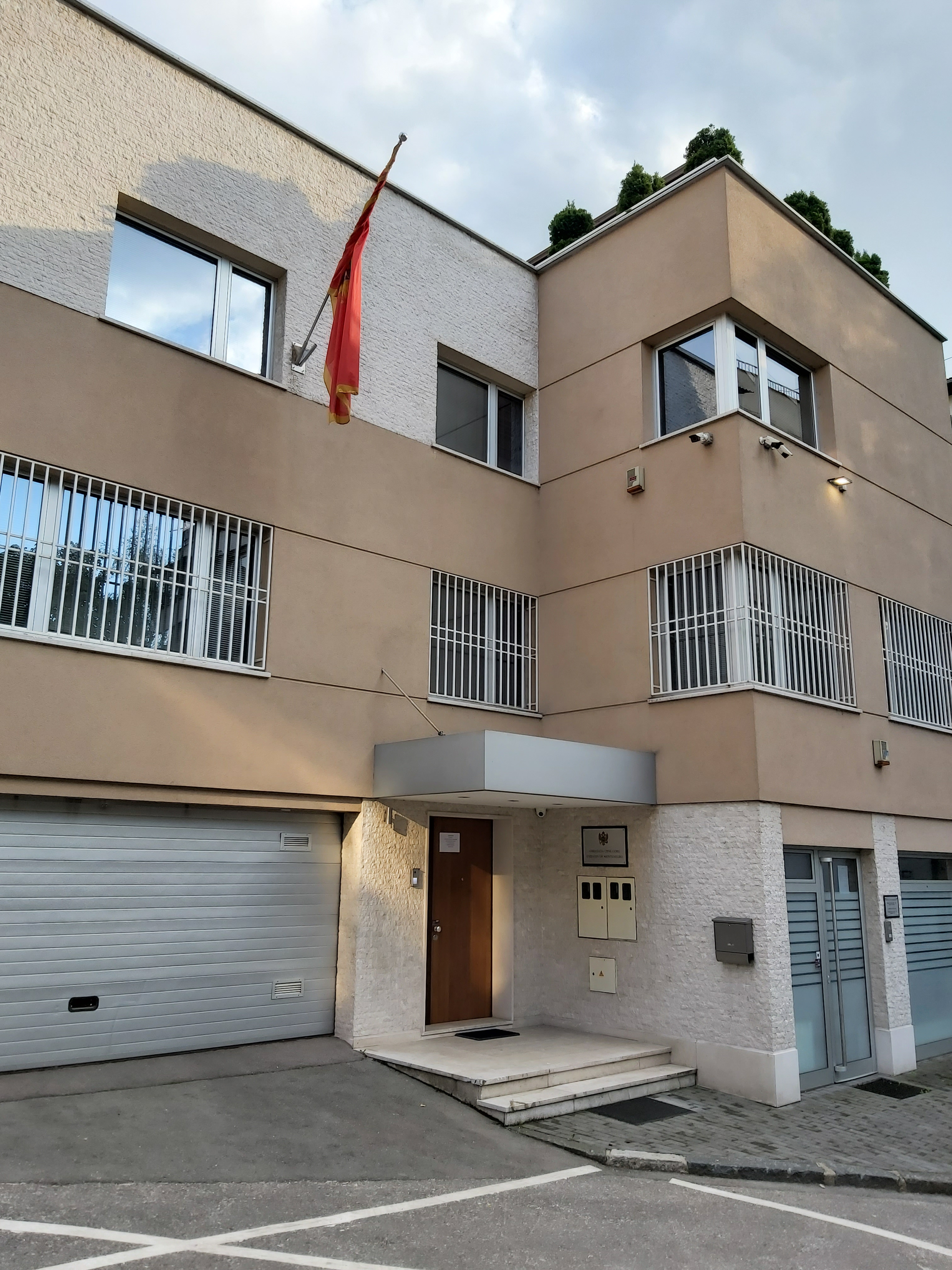
Embassy in Sarajevo

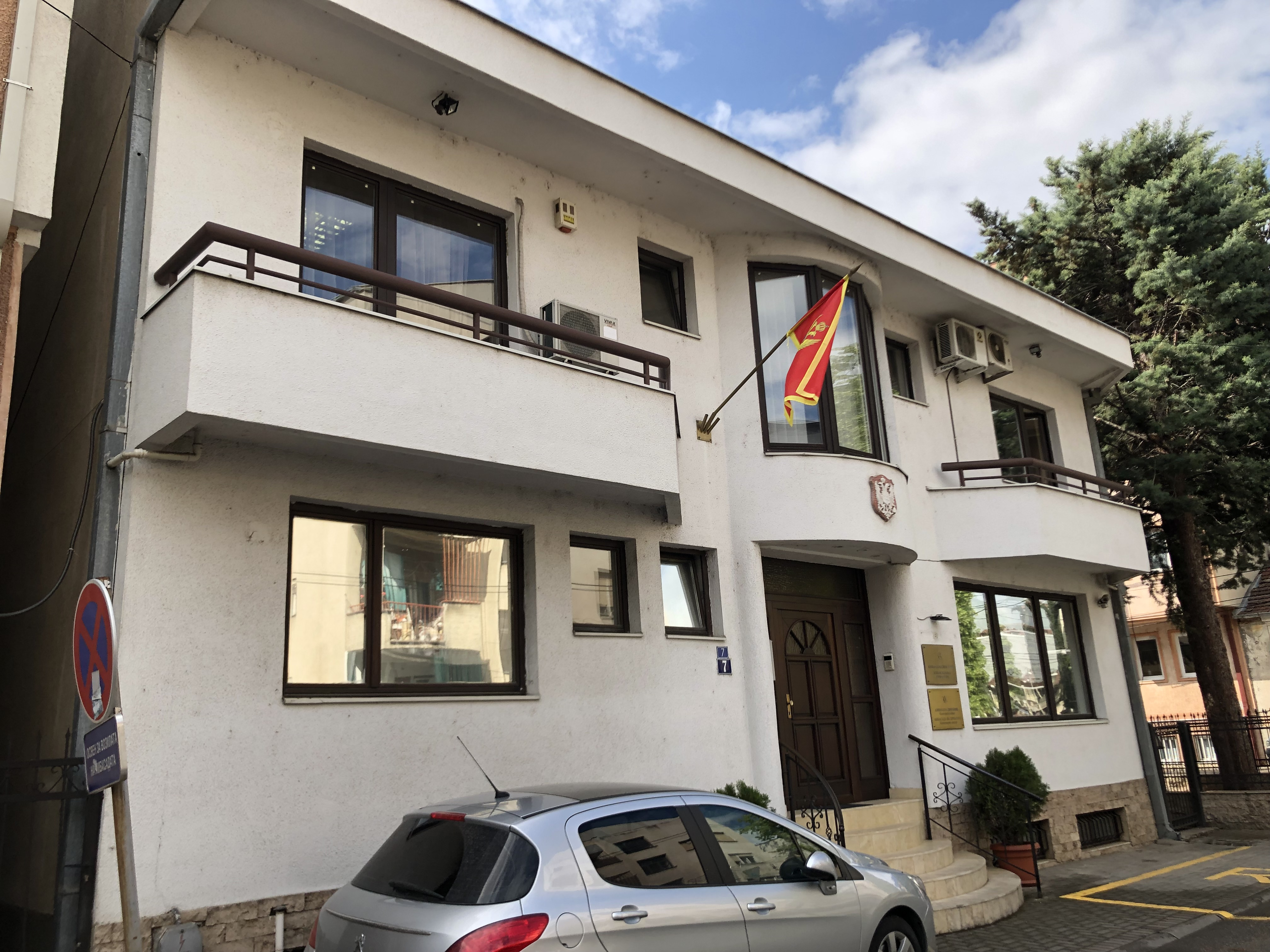
Embassy in Skopje

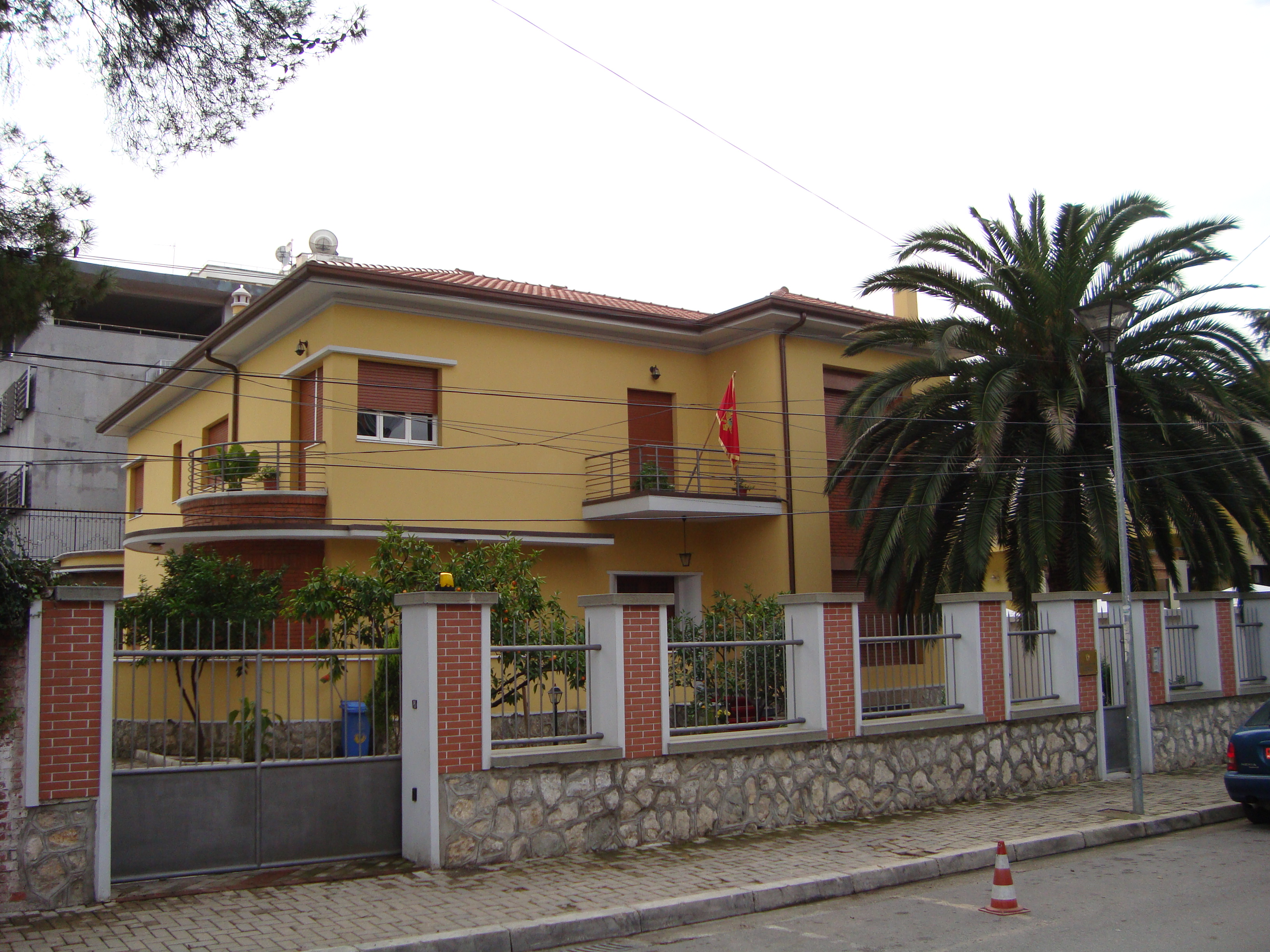
Embassy in Tirana

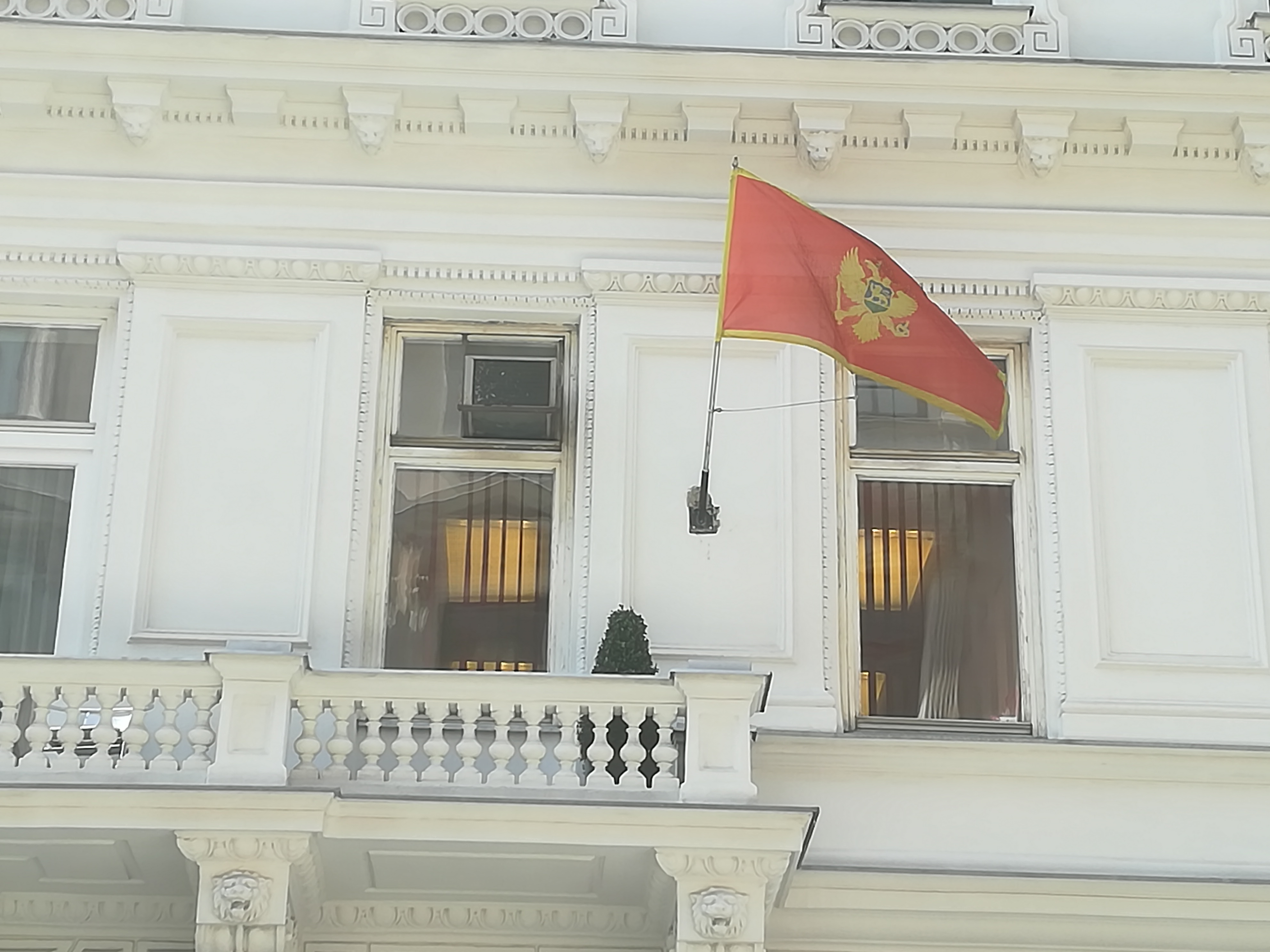
Embassy in Vienna

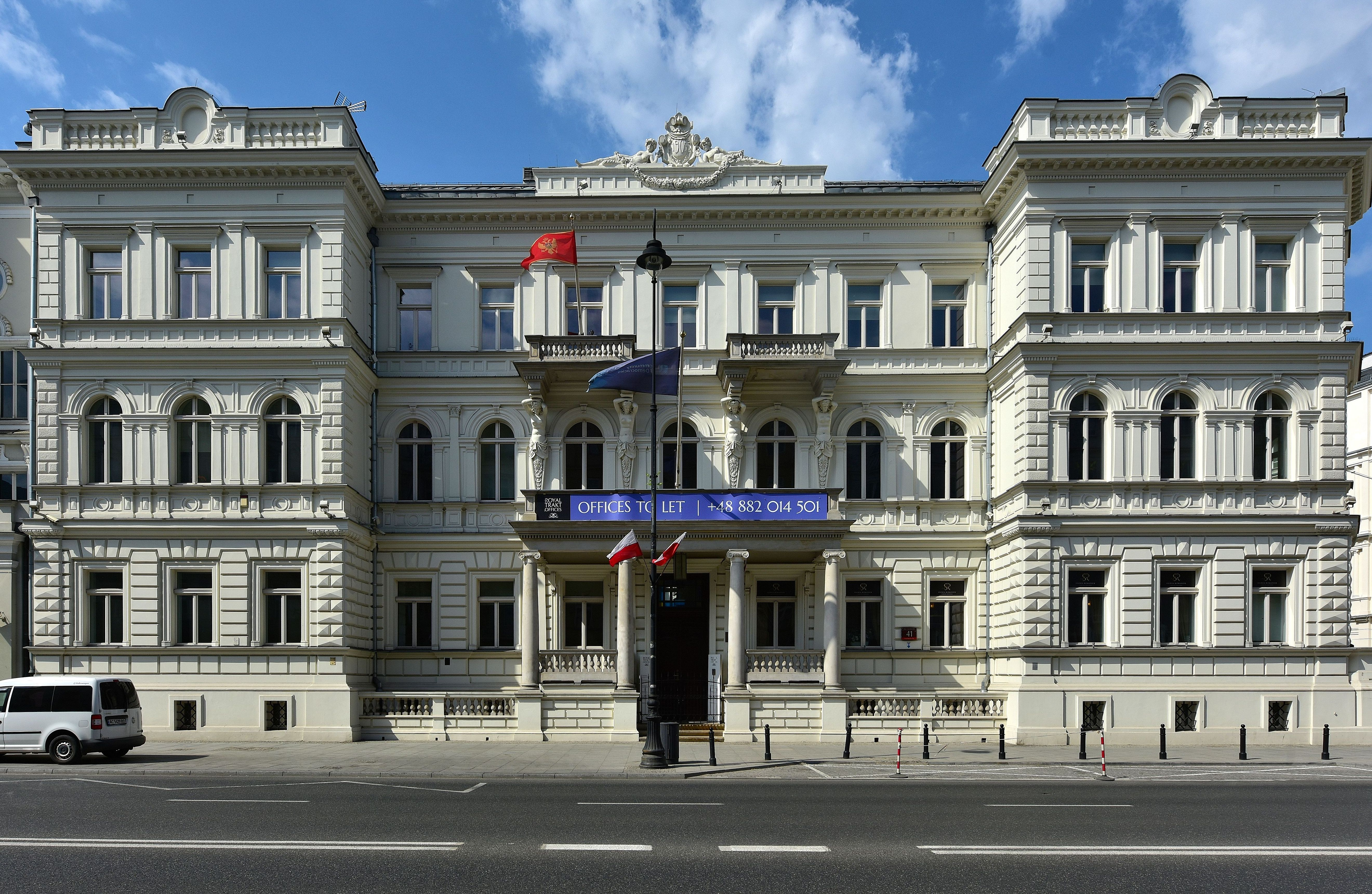
Embassy in Warsaw

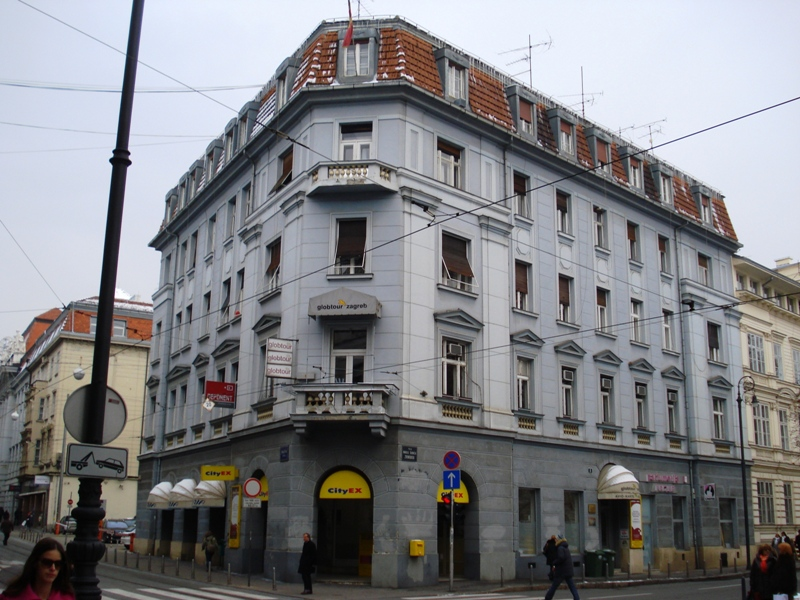
Embassy in Zagreb

== International Organisations ==
- NATO
  - Brussels
- OSCE
  - Vienna
- European Union
  - Brussels
- Council of Europe
  - Strasbourg
- United Nations
  - New York City (Note: Also accredited to Guatemala.)
  - Geneva
- UNESCO
  - Paris
- World Trade Organization
  - Geneva

== See also ==
- Foreign relations of Montenegro
- List of Ambassadors from Montenegro
